= 2024 South Carolina Senate election =

- November 5, 2024

All 46 seats in the South Carolina Senate 24 seats needed for a majority
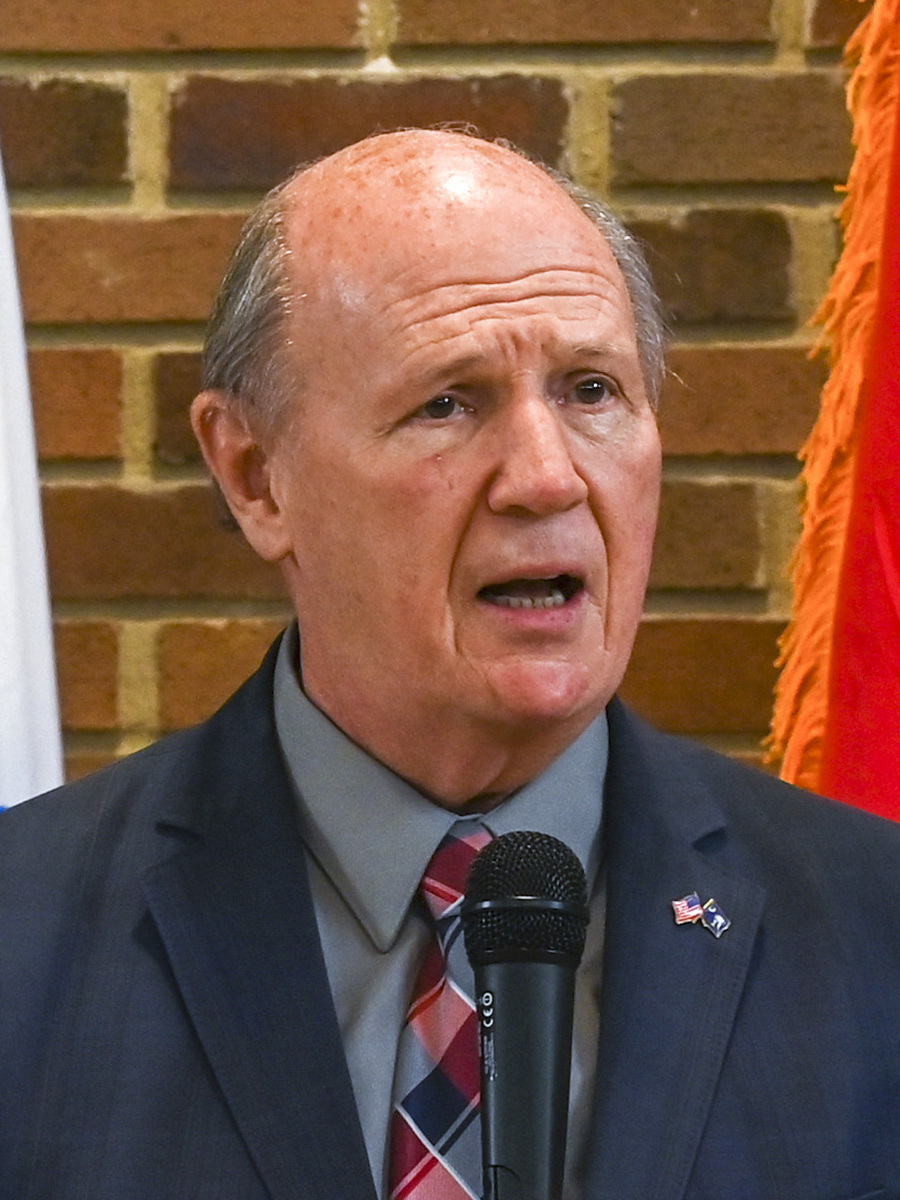

	Majority party	Minority party
Leader	Thomas Alexander	Brad Hutto
Party	Republican	Democratic
Leader since	December 6, 2021	November 17, 2020
Leader's seat	1st	40th
Last election	30	16
Seats before	30	15
Seats after	34	12
Seat change	▲4	▼3
- Results: Republican gain Democratic gain Republican hold Democratic hold
President before election
Thomas C. Alexander
Republican
Elected President
Thomas C. Alexander
Republican

The 2024 South Carolina Senate election was held on November 5, 2024, alongside the 2024 United States elections. Primary elections took place on June 11, 2024.

== Certified parties ==
The political parties certified in South Carolina for the 2024 elections include the typical Republican and Democratic parties, chaired by Drew McKissick and Christale Spain, respectively. Additionally, several third-party candidates are running for state senate elections:

- Alliance Party of South Carolina: Chaired by Jim Rex, the 16th South Carolina Superintendent of Education. A central tenet of their platform is term limits. They ran a candidate in District 15 against incumbent Wes Climer.
- South Carolina Constitution Party: Chaired by Ted Adams. They ran no candidates for state senate.
- South Carolina Forward Party: Formerly, the Independence Party of South Carolina. Chaired by Wayne Griffin.
- South Carolina Green Party: Co-chaired by Jessica Lazenby and Mike Stewart. They ran no candidates for state senate.
- Libertarian Party of South Carolina: Chaired by Kathryn Whitener. They ran a candidate in District 20.
- United Citizens Party: Chaired by Chris Nelums, who ran in the special election for District 19. He ran again for District 19 in the general election.
- South Carolina Workers Party: Co-chaired by Harold Geddings III and Leonard Lee Goff III. They ran candidates in Districts 16, 22, & 26.

== Special elections ==
=== District 31 (March 29, 2022) ===
After longtime Republican incumbent Hugh Leatherman died in November 2021, a special election was held to fill his seat to represent Florence, South Carolina, in the Senate. A Republican primary was held on January 25, and a special election was held on March 29.

South Carolina Senate District 31 Special Election Republican Primary
Party	Candidate	Votes	%
Republican	Jay Jordan	5,762	47.9
Republican	Mike Reichenbach	6,260	52.1
Total votes		12,022	100.0

South Carolina Senate District 31 Special Election
Party	Candidate	Votes	%
Republican	Mike Reichenbach	7,547	90.2
Democratic	Rosa Kay	811	9.7
Write-in		14	0.1
Total votes		8,372	100.0
Republican hold			

=== District 42 (May 11, 2023) ===
Democratic incumbent Marion Kimpson resigned May 11, 2023, after an appointment to the Advisory Committee for Trade Policy and Negotiations within the Office of the U.S. Trade Representative. Democratic primary was held on September 5, a Democratic runoff was held on September 19, and the special election was held on November 7.

South Carolina Senate District 42 Special Election Democratic Primary
Party	Candidate	Votes	%
Democratic	Wendell Gilliard	1,856	46.6
Democratic	JA Moore	588	14.8
Democratic	Deon Tedder	1,536	38.6
Total votes		3,980	100.0

South Carolina Senate District 42 Special Election Democratic Primary Runoff
Party	Candidate	Votes	%
Democratic	Wendell Gilliard	2,082	49.9
Democratic	Deon Tedder	2,093	50.1
Total votes		4,175	100.0

South Carolina Senate District 42, 2023 special election
Party	Candidate	Votes	%
Democratic	Deon Tedder	10,565	81.69
Republican	Rosa Kay	2,322	17.95
Write-in		46	0.36
Total votes		12,933	100.0
Democratic hold			

=== District 19 (January 2, 2024) ===
Incumbent John L. Scott Jr. died August 13, 2023, from blood clot complications. A special election was held on January 2, 2024.

South Carolina Senate District 19, special election, 2024
Party	Candidate	Votes	%
Democratic	Tameika Isaac Devine	4,568	85.96
Republican	Kizzie Smalls	513	9.65
Forward	Michael Addison	144	2.71
United Citizens	Chris Nelums	85	1.60
Write-in		4	0.08
Total votes		5,314	100.0
Democratic hold			

== Results ==
Party	Votes		Seats		
Party	No.	%	No.	+/−	%
South Carolina Republican Party	1,350,807	63.11%	34	+4	73.91
South Carolina Democratic Party	734,338	34.31%	12	-3	26.09
Write-in	14,632	0.68%	0	0	0.00
Alliance Party	12,669	0.59%	0	0	0.00
South Carolina Workers Party	12,007	0.56%	0	0	0.00
Libertarian Party of South Carolina	11,165	0.52%	0	0	0.00
United Citizens Party	4,779	0.22%	0	0	0.00
Total	2,140,397	100.00%	46	±0	100.00

== Summary ==
District	Incumbent	Party	Elected Senator	Party	Result
1st	Thomas C. Alexander	Rep	Thomas C. Alexander (Note: Running unopposed in the general election.)	Rep	Republican hold
2nd	Rex Rice	Rep	Rex Rice	Rep	Republican hold
3rd	Richard Cash	Rep	Richard Cash	Rep	Republican hold
4th	Michael Gambrell	Rep	Michael Gambrell	Rep	Republican hold
5th	Thomas D. Corbin	Rep	Thomas D. Corbin	Rep	Republican hold
6th	Dwight Loftis (Note: Not seeking reelection, therefore this seat is open.)	Rep	Jason Elliott	Rep	Republican hold
7th	Karl B. Allen	Dem	Karl B. Allen	Dem	Democratic hold
8th	Ross Turner	Rep	Ross Turner	Rep	Republican hold
9th	Danny Verdin	Rep	Danny Verdin	Rep	Republican hold
10th	Billy Garrett	Rep	Billy Garrett	Rep	Republican hold
11th	Josh Kimbrell	Rep	Josh Kimbrell	Rep	Republican hold
12th	Scott Talley	Rep	Roger Allen Nutt	Rep	Republican hold
13th	Shane Martin	Rep	Shane Martin	Rep	Republican hold
14th	Harvey S. Peeler Jr.	Rep	Harvey S. Peeler Jr.	Rep	Republican hold
15th	Wes Climer	Rep	Wes Climer	Rep	Republican hold
16th	Michael Johnson	Rep	Michael Johnson	Rep	Republican hold
17th	Mike Fanning	Dem	Everett Stubbs	Rep	Republican GAIN
18th	Ronnie Cromer	Rep	Ronnie Cromer	Rep	Republican hold
19th	Tameika Isaac Devine	Dem	Tameika Isaac Devine	Dem	Democratic hold
20th	New Seat	Dem	Ed Sutton	Dem	Democratic hold
21st	Darrell Jackson	Dem	Darrell Jackson	Dem	Democratic hold
22nd	Mia McLeod	Ind	Overture Walker	Dem	Democratic GAIN
23rd	Katrina Shealy	Rep	Carlisle Kennedy	Rep	Republican hold
24th	Tom Young Jr.	Rep	Tom Young Jr.	Rep	Republican hold
25th	A. Shane Massey	Rep	A. Shane Massey	Rep	Republican hold
26th	Nikki G. Setzler	Dem	Russell Ott	Dem	Democratic hold
26th	Dick Harpootlian (Redistricted from the 20th district)	Dem	Russell Ott	Dem	Democratic hold
27th	Penry Gustafson	Rep	Allen Blackmon	Rep	Republican hold
28th	Greg Hembree	Rep	Greg Hembree	Rep	Republican hold
29th	Gerald Malloy	Dem	JD Chaplin	Rep	Republican GAIN
30th	Kent M. Williams	Dem	Kent M. Williams	Dem	Democratic hold
31st	Mike Reichenbach	Rep	Mike Reichenbach	Rep	Republican hold
32nd	Ronnie A. Sabb	Dem	Ronnie A. Sabb	Dem	Democratic hold
33rd	Luke A. Rankin	Rep	Luke A. Rankin	Rep	Republican hold
34th	Stephen Goldfinch	Rep	Stephen Goldfinch	Rep	Republican hold
35th	Thomas McElveen	Dem	Jeffrey R. Graham	Dem	Democratic hold
36th	Kevin L. Johnson	Dem	Jeff Zell	Rep	Republican GAIN
37th	Larry Grooms	Rep	Larry Grooms	Rep	Republican hold
38th	Sean Bennett	Rep	Sean Bennett	Rep	Republican hold
39th	Vernon Stephens	Dem	Tom Fernandez	Rep	Republican GAIN
40th	Brad Hutto	Dem	Brad Hutto	Dem	Democratic hold
41st	Sandy Senn	Rep	Matt Leber	Rep	Republican hold
42nd	Deon Tedder	Dem	Deon Tedder	Dem	Democratic hold
43rd	Chip Campsen	Rep	Chip Campsen	Rep	Republican hold
44th	Brian Adams	Rep	Brian Adams	Rep	Republican hold
45th	Margie Bright Matthews	Dem	Margie Bright Matthews	Dem	Democratic hold
46th	Tom Davis	Rep	Tom Davis	Rep	Republican hold

== Retirements ==
Five incumbents did not seek re-election.

=== Democrats ===
1. District 26: Nikki G. Setzler retired.
2. District 35: Thomas McElveen retired.

=== Republicans ===
1. District 6: Dwight Loftis retired.
2. District 12: Scott Talley retired.

=== Independents ===
1. District 22: Mia McLeod retired.

== Incumbents defeated ==
=== In primary election ===
Three incumbent senators, one Democrat and two Republicans, were defeated in the June 11 primary election. One more incumbent senator, a Republican, was defeated in the June 25 primary runoff election.

==== Democrats ====
1. District 26: Dick Harpootlian lost renomination to Russell Ott.

==== Republicans ====
1. District 23: Katrina Shealy lost renomination to Carlisle Kennedy.
2. District 27: Penry Gustafson lost renomination to Allen Blackmon.
3. District 41: Sandy Senn lost renomination to Matt Leber.

=== In general election ===
Four incumbent senators, all Democrats, were defeated in the general election. One more incumbent senator, a Republican, was defeated in the June 25 primary runoff election.

==== Democrats ====
1. District 36: Kevin L. Johnson lost renomination.
2. District 39: Vernon Stephens lost renomination.
3. District 17: Mike Fanning lost renomination.
4. District 29: Gerald Malloy lost renomination.

== Predictions ==
Source	Ranking	As of
CNalysis	Solid R	April 11, 2024

== Detailed results ==
=== District 1 ===
District 1 covers parts of Oconee and Pickens Counties. Incumbent Thomas C. Alexander ran unopposed in the Republican primary and the general election. If reelected, it will be his eighth full-term and mark over 30 consecutive years in the Senate.

South Carolina Senate District 1 General Election, 2024
Party	Candidate	Votes	%
Republican	Thomas C. Alexander (incumbent)	41,348	98.91
Write-in		455	1.09
Total votes		41,803	100.00
Republican hold			

=== District 2 ===
District 2 is contained within Pickens County. Incumbent Rex Rice ran unopposed in the Republican primary and the general election for a third term.

South Carolina Senate District 2 General Election, 2024
Party	Candidate	Votes	%
Republican	Rex Rice (incumbent)	47,204	98.89
Write-in		530	1.11
Total votes		47,734	100.00
Republican hold			

=== District 3 ===
District 3 consists of Northern Anderson County. Republican incumbent Richard Cash sought a second full term, while Democrat and mental health counselor, Jessicka Spearman, sought to unseat him in the general election.

South Carolina Senate District 3 General Election, 2024
Party	Candidate	Votes	%
Republican	Richard Cash (incumbent)	46,333	75.41
Democratic	Jessicka Spearman	15,047	24.49
Write-in		62	0.10
Total votes		61,442	100.00
Republican hold			

=== District 4 ===
Incumbent Michael Gambrell ran unopposed in the Republican primary and the general election.

South Carolina Senate District 4 General Election, 2024
Party	Candidate	Votes	%
Republican	Michael Gambrell (incumbent)	37,010	99.25
Write-in		280	0.75
Total votes		37,290	100.00
Republican hold			

=== District 5 ===
Incumbent Tom Corbin ran unopposed in the Republican primary and the general election.

South Carolina Senate District 5 General Election, 2024
Party	Candidate	Votes	%
Republican	Tom Corbin (incumbent)	49,132	98.89
Write-in		549	1.11
Total votes		49,681	100.00
Republican hold			

=== District 6 ===
South Carolina Senate District 6 Republican Primary Election, 2024
Party	Candidate	Votes	%
Republican	Jason Elliott	6,882	48.4%
Republican	Ben Carper	4,466	31.4%
Republican	Dan Nickles	2,883	20.3%
Total votes		14,231	100%

South Carolina Senate District 6 Republican Primary Runoff Election, 2024
Party	Candidate	Votes	%
Republican	Jason Elliott	4,542	51.7%
Republican	Ben Carper	4,249	48.3%
Total votes		8,791	100%

South Carolina Senate District 6 General Election, 2024
Party	Candidate	Votes	%
Republican	Jason Elliott	40,759	97.55
Write-in		1,025	2.45
Total votes		41,784	100.00
Republican hold			

=== District 7 ===
South Carolina Senate District 7 Democratic Primary Election, 2024
Party	Candidate	Votes	%
Democratic	Karl B. Allen (incumbent)	2,572	68%
Democratic	Michelle Goodwin Calwile	1,210	32%
Total votes		3,782	100%

South Carolina Senate District 7 General Election, 2024
Party	Candidate	Votes	%
Democratic	Karl B. Allen (incumbent)	29,967	97.07
Write-in		906	2.93
Total votes		30,873	100.00
Democratic hold			

=== District 8 ===
South Carolina Senate District 8 General Election, 2024
Party	Candidate	Votes	%
Republican	Ross Turner (incumbent)	39,251	62.98
Democratic	Taylor Culliver	23,011	36.92
Write-in		64	0.10
Total votes		62,326	100.00
Republican hold			

=== District 9 ===
South Carolina Senate District 9 General Election, 2024
Party	Candidate	Votes	%
Republican	Danny Verdin (incumbent)	38,275	70.24
Democratic	Randy Driggers	16,151	29.64
Write-in		62	0.11
Total votes		54,488	100.00
Republican hold			

=== District 10 ===
South Carolina Senate District 10 Republican Primary Election, 2024
Party	Candidate	Votes	%
Republican	Billy Garrett (incumbent)	5,282	41.1%
Republican	Charles Bumgardner	2,969	23.1%
Republican	Troy Simpson	2,497	19.4%
Republican	Taylor Bell	2,116	16.4%
Total votes		12,864	100%

South Carolina Senate District 10 Republican Primary Runoff Election, 2024
Party	Candidate	Votes	%
Republican	Billy Garrett (incumbent)	4,920	56.2%
Republican	Charles Bumgardner	3,835	43.8%
Total votes		8,755	100%

South Carolina Senate District 10 Democratic Primary Election, 2024
Party	Candidate	Votes	%
Democratic	Francie Kleckley	1,019	51%
Democratic	Brandon L Best	979	49%
Total votes		1,998	100%

South Carolina Senate District 10 General Election, 2024
Party	Candidate	Votes	%
Republican	Billy Garrett (incumbent)	38,994	69.09
Democratic	Francie Kleckley	17,349	30.74
Write-in		99	0.18
Total votes		56,442	100.00
Republican hold			

=== District 11 ===
South Carolina Senate District 11 Democratic Primary Election, 2024
Party	Candidate	Votes	%
Democratic	Angela Geter	1,063	72.1
Democratic	Sevi Alvarez	412	27.9
Total votes		1,475	100%

South Carolina Senate District 11 General Election, 2024
Party	Candidate	Votes	%
Republican	Josh Kimbrell (incumbent)	30,362	65.25
Democratic	Angela Geter	16,118	34.64
Write-in		51	0.11
Total votes		46,531	100.00
Republican hold			

=== District 12 ===
South Carolina Senate District 12 Republican Primary Election, 2024
Party	Candidate	Votes	%
Republican	Lee Bright	4,186	36.5%
Republican	Roger Nutt	2,656	23.2%
Republican	Hope Blackley	2,520	22%
Republican	Skip Davenport	2,091	18.3%
Total votes		11,453	100%

South Carolina Senate District 12 Republican Primary Runoff Election, 2024
Party	Candidate	Votes	%
Republican	Roger Nutt	3,163	51.2%
Republican	Lee Bright	3,020	48.8%
Total votes		6,183	100%

South Carolina Senate District 12 General Election, 2024
Party	Candidate	Votes	%
Republican	Roger Nutt	36,715	64.04
Democratic	Octavia Amaechi	20,545	35.84
Write-in		70	0.12
Total votes		57,330	100.00
Republican hold			

=== District 13 ===
Incumbent Shane Martin ran unopposed in the Republican primary and the general election.

South Carolina Senate District 13 General Election, 2024
Party	Candidate	Votes	%
Republican	Shane Martin (incumbent)	44,583	98.42
Write-in		714	1.58
Total votes		45,297	100.00
Republican hold			

=== District 14 ===
Incumbent Harvey S. Peeler Jr. ran unopposed in the Republican primary and the general election.

South Carolina Senate District 14 General Election, 2024
Party	Candidate	Votes	%
Republican	Harvey S. Peeler Jr. (incumbent)	43,933	99.09
Write-in		402	0.91
Total votes		44,335	100.00
Republican hold			

=== District 15 ===
South Carolina Senate District 15 General Election, 2024
Party	Candidate	Votes	%
Republican	Wes Climer (incumbent)	41,008	76.05
Alliance	Sarah Work	12,669	23.49
Write-in		246	0.46
Total votes		53,923	100.00
Republican hold			

=== District 16 ===
South Carolina Senate District 16 General Election, 2024
Party	Candidate	Votes	%
Republican	Michael Johnson (incumbent)	45,672	78.78
SCWP	Kiral Mace	12,007	20.71
Write-in		298	0.51
Total votes		57,977	100.00
Republican hold			

=== District 17 ===
South Carolina Senate District 17 Republican Primary Election, 2024
Party	Candidate	Votes	%
Republican	Everett Stubbs	3,921	58.2%
Republican	Tripp McCoy	1,715	25.4%
Republican	Tibi Czentye	1,106	16.4%
Total votes		6,742	100%

South Carolina Senate District 17 General Election, 2024
Party	Candidate	Votes	%
Republican	Everett Stubbs	27,953	49.98
Democratic	Mike Fanning (incumbent)	27,924	49.93
Write-in		54	0.10
Total votes		55,931	100.00
Republican gain from Democratic			

=== District 18 ===
Incumbent Ronnie Cromer ran unopposed in the Republican primary and the general election.

South Carolina Senate District 18 General Election, 2024
Party	Candidate	Votes	%
Republican	Ronnie Cromer (incumbent)	51,289	98.60
Write-in		726	1.40
Total votes		52,015	100.00
Republican hold			

=== District 19 ===
South Carolina Senate District 19 Democratic Primary Election, 2024
Party	Candidate	Votes	%
Democratic	Tameika Isaac Devine (incumbent)	5,666	91.9%
Democratic	Michael Addison	500	8.1%
Total votes		6,166	100%

South Carolina Senate District 19 General Election, 2024
Party	Candidate	Votes	%
Democratic	Tameika Isaac Devine (incumbent)	33,703	87.27
United Citizens	Chris Nelums	4,779	12.38
Write-in		136	0.35
Total votes		38,618	100.00
Democratic hold			

=== District 20 ===
South Carolina Senate District 20 General Election, 2024
Party	Candidate	Votes	%
Democratic	Ed Sutton	31,418	73.42
Libertarian	Kendal Ludden	11,165	26.09
Write-in		209	0.49
Total votes		42,792	100.00
Democratic hold			

=== District 21 ===
Incumbent Darrell Jackson (politician) ran unopposed in the Democratic primary and the general election.

South Carolina Senate District 21 General Election, 2024
Party	Candidate	Votes	%
Democratic	Darrell Jackson (incumbent)	36,370	98.54
Write-in		540	1.46
Total votes		36,910	100.00
Democratic hold			

=== District 22 ===
South Carolina Senate District 22 Democratic Primary Election, 2024
Party	Candidate	Votes	%
Democratic	Ivory Torrey Thigpen	3,208	42.9%
Democratic	Overture Walker	3,019	40.4%
Democratic	Monica Elkins	1,254	16.8%
Total votes		7,481	100%

South Carolina Senate District 22 Democratic Primary Runoff Election, 2024
Party	Candidate	Votes	%
Democratic	Overture Walker	2,851	53.6%
Democratic	Ivory Torrey Thigpen	2,464	46.4%
Total votes		5,315	100%

South Carolina Senate District 22 General Election, 2024
Party	Candidate	Votes	%
Democratic	Overture Walker	41,207	98.54
Write-in		609	1.46
Total votes		41,816	100.00
Democratic gain from Independent			

=== District 23 ===
Incumbent Republican Katrina Shealy ran for re-election, but was defeated in the Republican primary. Shealy had drawn national attention during the previous legislative session when she joined with the chamber's other female senators, including two other Republicans, in a filibuster of a proposed total abortion ban. Her actions drew the ire of the state Republican party, leading to her primary challenge, which she lost in a runoff.

South Carolina Senate District 23 Republican Primary Election, 2024
Party	Candidate	Votes	%
Republican	Katrina Shealy (incumbent)	4,359	40%
Republican	Carlisle Kennedy	3,946	36.2
Republican	Zoe Warren	2,587	23.8%
Total votes		11,892	100%

South Carolina Senate District 23 Republican Primary Runoff Election, 2024
Party	Candidate	Votes	%
Republican	Carlisle Kennedy	4,863	62.5%
Republican	Katrina Shealy (incumbent)	2,921	37.5
Total votes		7,784	100%

South Carolina Senate District 23 General Election, 2024
Party	Candidate	Votes	%
Republican	Carlisle Kennedy	41,467	97.92
Write-in		879	2.08
Total votes		42,346	100.00
Republican hold			

=== District 24 ===
South Carolina Senate District 24 General Election, 2024
Party	Candidate	Votes	%
Republican	Tom Young Jr. (incumbent)	38,470	67.01
Democratic	Dee Elder	18,909	32.94
Write-in		30	0.05
Total votes		57,409	100.00
Republican hold			

=== District 25 ===
Incumbent A. Shane Massey ran unopposed in the Republican primary and the general election.

South Carolina Senate District 25 General Election, 2024
Party	Candidate	Votes	%
Republican	A. Shane Massey (incumbent)	43,300	98.99
Write-in		441	1.01
Total votes		43,741	100.00
Republican hold			

=== District 26 ===
During the 2021 decennial reapportionment, Democratic incumbents Nikki G. Setzler and Dick Harpootlian were drawn into the same district. Setzler, the longest serving state senator in office in the country, has chosen to retire rather than seek a thirteenth term. State Representative Russell Ott defeated Dick Harpootlian for the Democratic nomination while Jason Guerry defeated Chris Smith for the Republican nomination.

South Carolina Senate District 26 Republican Primary Election, 2024
Party	Candidate	Votes	%
Republican	Chris Smith	1,826	38.2%
Republican	Jason Guerry	1,687	35.3%
Republican	Billy Oswald	1,264	26.5%
Total votes		4,777	100%

South Carolina Senate District 26 Republican Primary Runoff Election, 2024
Party	Candidate	Votes	%
Republican	Jason Guerry	1,088	54.7%
Republican	Chris Smith	900	45.3%
Total votes		1,988	100%

South Carolina Senate District 26 Democratic Primary Election, 2024
Party	Candidate	Votes	%
Democratic	Russell Ott	2,414	51.3%
Democratic	Dick Harpootlian (incumbent)	2,294	48.7%
Total votes		4,708	100%

South Carolina Senate District 26 General Election, 2024
Party	Candidate	Votes	%
Democratic	Russell Ott	22,049	54.83
Republican	Jason Guerry	18,104	45.02
Write-in		62	0.15
Total votes		40,215	100.00
Democratic hold			

=== District 27 ===
Incumbent Republican Penry Gustafson ran for re-election, but was defeated in the Republican primary. Gustafson had drawn national attention during the previous legislative session when she joined with the chamber's other female senators, including two other Republicans, in a filibuster of a proposed total abortion ban. Her actions drew the ire of the state Republican party, leading to her primary challenge, which she lost.

South Carolina Senate District 27 Republican Primary Election, 2024
Party	Candidate	Votes	%
Republican	Allen Blackmon	6,096	82.1%
Republican	Penry Gustafson (incumbent)	1,332	17.9%
Total votes		7,428	100%

South Carolina Senate District 27 General Election, 2024
Party	Candidate	Votes	%
Republican	Allen Blackmon	37,693	70.16
Democratic	Yokima Cureton	15,976	29.74
Write-in		57	0.11
Total votes		53,726	100.00
Republican hold			

=== District 28 ===
South Carolina Senate District 28 General Election, 2024
Party	Candidate	Votes	%
Republican	Greg Hembree (incumbent)	56,477	99.13
Write-in		498	0.87
Total votes		56,975	100.00
Republican hold			

=== District 29 ===
South Carolina Senate District 29 General Election, 2024
Party	Candidate	Votes	%
Republican	JD Chaplin	24,838	50.03
Democratic	Gerald Malloy (incumbent)	24,751	49.86
Write-in		53	0.11
Total votes		49,642	100.00
Republican gain from Democratic			

=== District 30 ===
South Carolina Senate District 30 General Election, 2024
Party	Candidate	Votes	%
Democratic	Kent M. Williams (incumbent)	25,430	54.68
Republican	Rodney Berry	21,024	45.21
Write-in		54	0.12
Total votes		46,508	100.00
Democratic hold			

=== District 31 ===
South Carolina Senate District 31 General Election, 2024
Party	Candidate	Votes	%
Republican	Mike Reichenbach (incumbent)	32,528	65.96
Democratic	Belinda Timmons	16,757	33.98
Write-in		31	0.06
Total votes		49,316	100.00
Republican hold			

=== District 32 ===
South Carolina Senate District 32 Democratic Primary Election, 2024
Party	Candidate	Votes	%
Democratic	Ronnie A. Sabb (incumbent)	5,741	76.2%
Democratic	Prinscillia Sumpter	1,797	23.8%
Total votes		7,538	100%

South Carolina Senate District 32 General Election, 2024
Party	Candidate	Votes	%
Democratic	Ronnie A. Sabb (incumbent)	31,477	98.22
Write-in		571	1.78
Total votes		32,048	100.00
Democratic hold			

=== District 33 ===
South Carolina Senate District 33 Republican Primary Election, 2024
Party	Candidate	Votes	%
Republican	Luke A. Rankin (incumbent)	3,831	54.1%
Republican	Autry Benton	3,250	45.9%
Total votes		7,081	100%

South Carolina Senate District 33 General Election, 2024
Party	Candidate	Votes	%
Republican	Luke A. Rankin (incumbent)	39,618	68.46
Democratic	Pete John Bember	18,130	31.33
Write-in		124	0.21
Total votes		57,872	100.00
Republican hold			

=== District 34 ===
Incumbent Stephen Goldfinch ran unopposed in the Republican primary and the general election.

South Carolina Senate District 34 General Election, 2024
Party	Candidate	Votes	%
Republican	Stephen Goldfinch (incumbent)	56,987	98.99
Write-in		581	1.01
Total votes		57,568	100.00
Republican hold			

=== District 35 ===
South Carolina Senate District 35 Republican Primary Election, 2024
Party	Candidate	Votes	%
Republican	Mike Jones	1,939	49.5%
Republican	Lindsay Agostini	1,189	30.4%
Republican	Christina Allard	650	16.6%
Republican	Jerry Chivers	138	3.5%
Total votes		3,916	100%

South Carolina Senate District 35 Republican Primary Runoff Election, 2024
Party	Candidate	Votes	%
Republican	Mike Jones	1,921	70.8
Republican	Lindsay Agostini	792	29.2%
Total votes		2,713	100%

South Carolina Senate District 35 Democratic Primary Election, 2024
Party	Candidate	Votes	%
Democratic	Jeffrey R. Graham	2,416	47%
Democratic	Austin Floyd Jr.	1,941	37.8%
Democratic	Lucy Mahon	784	15.2%
Total votes		5,141	100%

South Carolina Senate District 35 Democratic Primary Runoff Election, 2024
Party	Candidate	Votes	%
Democratic	Jeffrey R. Graham	1,791	50.3%
Democratic	Austin Floyd Jr.	1,767	49.7%
Total votes		3,558	100%

South Carolina Senate District 35 General Election, 2024
Party	Candidate	Votes	%
Democratic	Jeffrey R. Graham	25,284	52.18
Republican	Mike Jones	23,095	47.66
Write-in		77	0.16
Total votes		48,456	100.00
Democratic hold			

=== District 36 ===
South Carolina Senate District 36 Republican Primary Election, 2024
Party	Candidate	Votes	%
Republican	Jeff Zell	3,068	78.3%
Republican	Leon Winn	850	21.7%
Total votes		3,918	100%

South Carolina Senate District 36 Democratic Primary Election, 2024
Party	Candidate	Votes	%
Democratic	Kevin L. Johnson (incumbent)	5,825	77.5%
Democratic	Eleazer Leazer Carter	1,689	22.5
Total votes		7,514	100%

South Carolina Senate District 36 General Election, 2024
Party	Candidate	Votes	%
Republican	Jeff Zell	25,609	50.60
Democratic	Kevin L. Johnson (incumbent)	24,943	49.28
Write-in		61	0.12
Total votes		50,613	100.00
Republican gain from Democratic			

=== District 37 ===
Incumbent Larry Grooms ran unopposed in the Republican primary and the general election.

South Carolina Senate District 37 General Election, 2024
Party	Candidate	Votes	%
Republican	Larry Grooms (incumbent)	40,361	98.22
Write-in		731	1.78
Total votes		41,092	100.00
Republican hold			

=== District 38 ===
Incumbent Sean Bennett ran unopposed in the Republican primary and the general election.

South Carolina Senate District 38 General Election, 2024
Party	Candidate	Votes	%
Republican	Sean Bennett (incumbent)	35,738	98.20
Write-in		655	1.80
Total votes		36,393	100.00
Republican hold			

=== District 39 ===
South Carolina Senate District 39 General Election, 2024
Party	Candidate	Votes	%
Republican	Tom Fernandez	26,740	50.95
Democratic	Vernon Stephens (incumbent)	25,619	48.81
Write-in		124	0.24
Total votes		52,483	100.00
Republican gain from Democratic			

=== District 40 ===
District 40 covers Aiken, Allendale, Bamberg, Barnwell, Colleton, and Orangeburg counties. Incumbent Brad Hutto has held the seat since 1996. If he retains the seat, it will mark his eighth full term. Bamberg Democrat Kendrick Brown has filed to challenge him in the primary, and Bamberg Republican Sharon Carter has filed to challenge the winner in the general election.

South Carolina Senate District 40 Democratic Primary Election, 2024
Party	Candidate	Votes	%
Democratic	Brad Hutto (incumbent)	5,153	71.5%
Democratic	Kendrick Brown	2,055	28.5%
Total votes		7,208	100%

South Carolina Senate District 40 General Election, 2024
Party	Candidate	Votes	%
Democratic	Brad Hutto (incumbent)	24,667	52.54
Republican	Sharon Carter	22,243	47.38
Write-in		40	0.09
Total votes		46,950	100.00
Democratic hold			

=== District 41 ===
Incumbent Republican Sandy Senn ran for re-election, but was defeated in the Republican primary. Senn had drawn national attention during the previous legislative session when she joined with the chamber's other female senators, including two other Republicans, in a filibuster of a proposed total abortion ban. Her actions drew the ire of the state Republican party, leading to her primary challenge, which she lost.

South Carolina Senate District 41 Republican Primary Election, 2024
Party	Candidate	Votes	%
Republican	Matt Leber	3,939	50.2%
Republican	Sandy Senn (incumbent)	3,906	49.8%
Total votes		7,845	100%

South Carolina Senate District 41 General Election, 2024
Party	Candidate	Votes	%
Republican	Matt Leber	32,715	57.37
Democratic	Rita Adkins	24,195	42.43
Write-in		116	0.20
Total votes		57,026	100.00
Republican hold			

=== District 42 ===
South Carolina Senate District 42 Democratic Primary Election, 2024
Party	Candidate	Votes	%
Democratic	Deon Tedder (incumbent)	2,594	83.3%
Democratic	Kim Greene	520	16.7%
Total votes		3,114	100%

South Carolina Senate District 42 General Election, 2024
Party	Candidate	Votes	%
Democratic	Deon Tedder (incumbent)	26,088	98.20
Write-in		477	1.80
Total votes		26,565	100.00
Democratic hold			

=== District 43 ===
South Carolina Senate District 43 General Election, 2024
Party	Candidate	Votes	%
Republican	Chip Campsen (incumbent)	41,996	61.09
Democratic	Julie Cofer Hussey	26,697	38.84
Write-in		51	0.07
Total votes		68,744	100.00
Republican hold			

=== District 44 ===
South Carolina Senate District 44 Republican Primary Election, 2024
Party	Candidate	Votes	%
Republican	Brian Adams (incumbent)	5,201	80.2%
Republican	Shawn Pinkston	1,283	19.8%
Total votes		6,484	100%

South Carolina Senate District 44 General Election, 2024
Party	Candidate	Votes	%
Republican	Brian Adams (incumbent)	30,044	60.50
Democratic	Vicky Wynn	19,566	39.40
Write-in		49	0.10
Total votes		49,659	100.00
Republican hold			

=== District 45 ===
Incumbent Margie Bright Matthews ran unopposed in the Democratic primary and the general election.

South Carolina Senate District 45 General Election, 2024
Party	Candidate	Votes	%
Democratic	Margie Bright Matthews (incumbent)	31,710	97.70
Write-in		746	2.30
Total votes		32,456	100.00
Democratic hold			

=== District 46 ===
South Carolina Senate District 46 General Election, 2024
Party	Candidate	Votes	%
Republican	Tom Davis (incumbent)	47,989	67.30
Democratic	Gwyneth Saunders	23,280	32.65
Write-in		37	0.05
Total votes		71,306	100.00
Republican hold			

== Margins of victory ==
=== General Elections ===
District	Winning party	Margin
17	Republican	0.05%
26	Democratic	9.81%
29	Republican	0.17%
30	Democratic	9.47%
35	Democratic	4.52%
36	Republican	1.32%
39	Republican	1.14%
40	Democratic	5.16%

== See also ==
- 2024 United States elections
- 2024 South Carolina Democratic presidential primary
- 2024 South Carolina Republican presidential primary
- 2024 United States House of Representatives elections in South Carolina
- South Carolina Senate
- List of South Carolina state legislatures
