= 2016 South Carolina Senate election =

Part of the biennial United States elections

- November 8, 2016

All 46 seats in the South Carolina Senate 24 seats needed for a majority
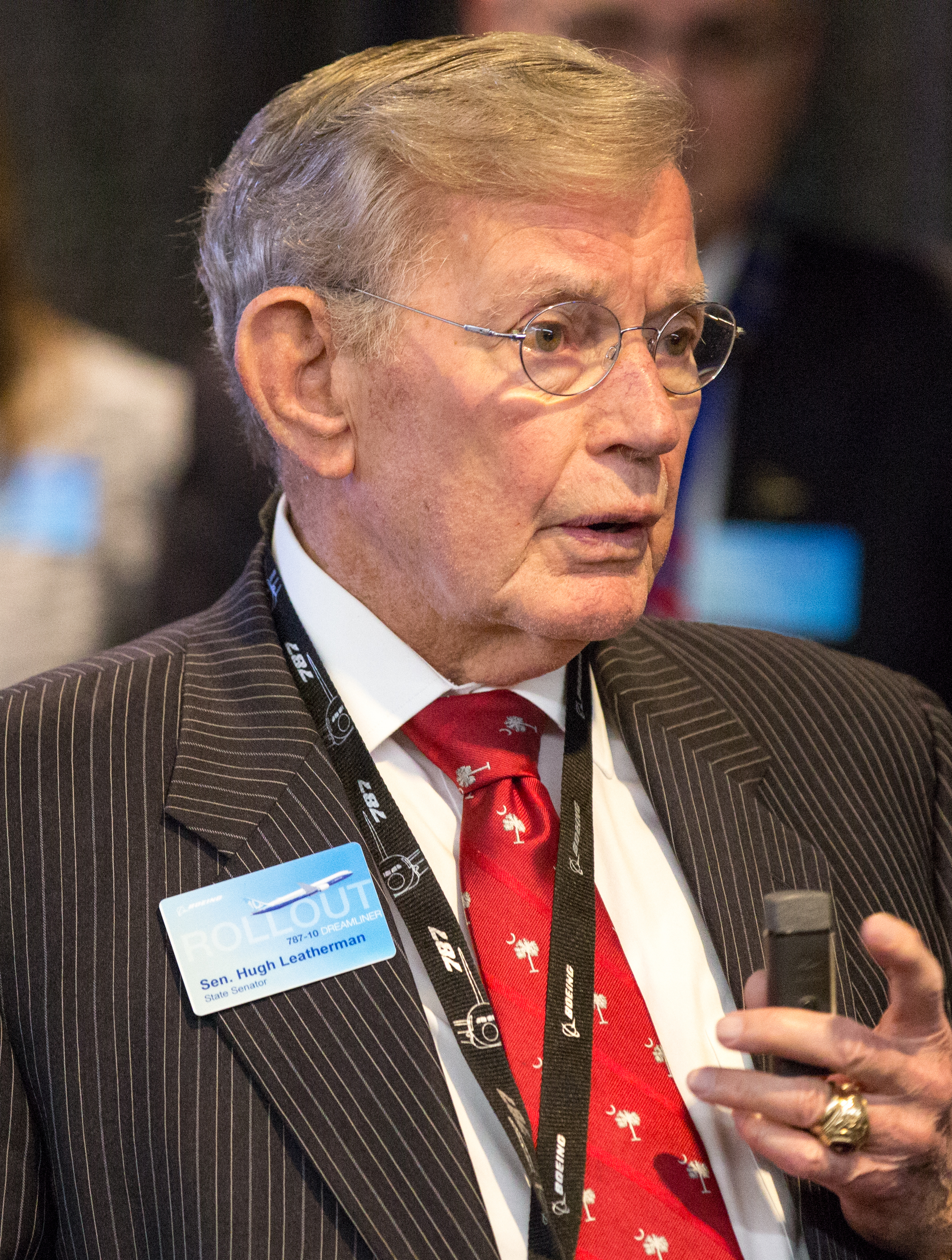

	Majority party	Minority party
Leader	Hugh Leatherman	Nikki G. Setzler
Party	Republican	Democratic
Leader's seat	31st	26th
Last election	28	18
Seats before	28	18
Seats after	28	18
Seat change	Steady	Steady
- Results: Republican hold Democratic hold
President pro tempore before election
Hugh Leatherman
Republican
Elected President pro tempore
Hugh Leatherman
Republican

The 2016 South Carolina Senate elections took place as part of the biennial United States elections. South Carolina voters elected state senators in all 46 districts. State senators serve four-year terms in the South Carolina Senate, with all the up for election each cycle.

The primary election was on June 14, 2016, and the primary runoff on June 28, 2016, determined which candidates appeared on the November 8, 2016 general election ballot.

Following the 2012 state senate elections, Republicans maintained effective control of the Senate with 28 members. To reclaim control of the chamber from Republicans, the Democrats needed to gain 6 Senate seats. Republicans retained control of the South Carolina Senate following the 2016 general election and the overall numerical composition of the chamber was unaltered.

== Special election ==
=== District 42 (October 1, 2013) ===
After Democratic incumbent Robert Ford resigned citing health problems amidst an ethics probe, a special election was triggered for District 42. A Democratic primary took place on August 13, a Democratic primary took place on August 27, and the special election took place on October 1, 2013, with Marlon Kimpson elected to serve.

=== District 32 (November 4, 2014) ===
When Democratic incumbent Yancey McGill became President Pro Tem of the Senate and then Lieutenant Governor of South Carolina, he vacated his seat. A Democratic primary and primary runoff were held on September 2 and 16, respectively. The special election was concurrently held with the 2014 United States Election, where Ronnie Sabb was elected to represent District 32.

=== District 45 (October 20, 2015) ===
The District 45 seat was left vacant after Reverend Clementa C. Pickney was murdered during the Charleston church massacre at Emanuel African Methodist Episcopal Church. A Democratic primary and primary runoff were held on September 1 and 15, respectively. The special election was held on October 20 and Margie Bright Matthews was elected to District 45.

=== District 4 (May 17, 2016) ===
After Billy O'Dell died in office due to heart problems, a special election was held. A Republican primary was held on March 22, and a primary runoff was held on April 5.

Initially, five Republicans ran in the primary, with a runoff initiated between Michael Gambrell and Rockey Burgess when no candidate received a majority of the votes. Gambrell defeated Burgess in the runoff with 57% of the vote. With no opposition, Gambrell won the special election on May 17.

South Carolina Senate District 4 Republican Primary, 2016 Special Election
Party	Candidate	Votes	%
Republican	Michael Gambrell		45.5
Republican	Rockey Burgess		31.9
Republican	Tripp Padgett		14.0
Republican	Willie Day		6.2
Republican	Mark Powell		2.3
Write-In			0.1
Total votes			100.0

South Carolina Senate District 4, Republican Primary Runoff, 2016 Special Election
Party	Candidate	Votes	%
Republican	Michael Gambrell		57
Republican	Rickey Burgess		42
Total votes			100.0

South Carolina Senate District 4, 2016 Special Election
Party	Candidate	Votes	%
Republican	Michael Gambrell	1,246	91.8
Other	Write-In	112	8.2
Total votes		1,358	100.0

== Predictions ==
Source	Ranking	As of
Governing	Safe R	October 12, 2016

== Results ==
District	Incumbent	Party	Elected Senator	Party	Result
1st	Thomas C. Alexander	Rep	Thomas C. Alexander	Rep	Republican HOLD
2nd	Larry A. Martin	Rep	Rex Rice	Rep	Republican HOLD
3rd	Kevin L. Bryant	Rep	Kevin L. Bryant	Rep	Republican HOLD
4th	Michael Gambrell	Rep	Michael Gambrell	Rep	Republican HOLD
5th	Tom Corbin	Rep	Tom Corbin	Rep	Republican HOLD
6th	Michael Fair	Rep	William Timmons	Rep	Republican HOLD
7th	Karl B. Allen	Dem	Karl B. Allen	Dem	Democratic HOLD
8th	Ross Turner	Rep	Ross Turner	Rep	Republican HOLD
9th	Danny Verdin	Rep	Danny Verdin	Rep	Republican HOLD
10th	Floyd Nicholson	Dem	Floyd Nicholson	Dem	Democratic HOLD
11th	Glenn G. Reese	Dem	Glenn G. Reese	Dem	Democratic HOLD
12th	Lee Bright	Rep	Scott Talley	Rep	Republican HOLD
13th	Shane Martin	Rep	Shane Martin	Rep	Republican HOLD
14th	Harvey S. Peeler Jr.	Rep	Harvey S. Peeler Jr.	Rep	Republican HOLD
15th	Robert W. Hayes Jr.	Rep	Wes Climer	Rep	Republican HOLD
16th	Greg Gregory	Rep	Greg Gregory	Rep	Republican HOLD
17th	Creighton B. Coleman	Dem	Mike Fanning	Dem	Democratic HOLD
18th	Ronnie Cromer	Rep	Ronnie Cromer	Rep	Republican HOLD
19th	John L. Scott Jr.	Dem	John L. Scott Jr.	Dem	Democratic HOLD
20th	John Courson	Rep	John Courson	Rep	Republican HOLD
21st	Darrell Jackson	Dem	Darrell Jackson	Dem	Democratic HOLD
22nd	Joel Lourie	Dem	Mia McLeod	Dem	Democratic HOLD
23rd	Katrina Shealy	Rep	Katrina Shealy	Rep	Republican HOLD
24th	Tom Young Jr.	Rep	Tom Young Jr.	Rep	Republican HOLD
25th	Shane Massey	Rep	Shane Massey	Rep	Republican HOLD
26th	Nikki Setzler	Dem	Nikki Setzler	Dem	Democratic HOLD
27th	Vincent Sheheen	Dem	Vincent Sheheen	Dem	Democratic HOLD
28th	Greg Hembree	Rep	Greg Hembree	Rep	Republican HOLD
29th	Gerald Malloy	Dem	Gerald Malloy	Dem	Democratic HOLD
30th	Kent Williams	Dem	Kent Williams	Dem	Democratic HOLD
31st	Hugh Leatherman	Rep	Hugh Leatherman	Rep	Republican HOLD
32nd	Ronnie Sabb	Dem	Ronnie Sabb	Dem	Democratic HOLD
33rd	Luke Rankin	Rep	Luke Rankin	Rep	Republican HOLD
34th	Raymond Cleary	Rep	Stephen Goldfinch	Rep	Republican HOLD
35th	Thomas McElveen	Dem	Thomas McElveen	Dem	Democratic HOLD
36th	Kevin Johnson	Dem	Kevin Johnson	Dem	Democratic HOLD
37th	Lawrence Grooms	Rep	Lawrence Grooms	Rep	Republican HOLD
38th	Sean Bennett	Rep	Sean Bennett	Rep	Republican HOLD
39th	John W. Matthews Jr.	Dem	John W. Matthews Jr.	Dem	Democratic HOLD
40th	Brad Hutto	Dem	Brad Hutto	Dem	Democratic HOLD
41st	Paul Thurmond	Rep	Sandy Senn	Rep	Republican HOLD
42nd	Marlon Kimpson	Dem	Marlon Kimpson	Dem	Democratic HOLD
43rd	George Campsen	Rep	George Campsen	Rep	Republican HOLD
44th	Paul G. Campbell Jr.	Rep	Paul G. Campbell Jr.	Rep	Republican HOLD
45th	Margie Bright Matthews	Dem	Margie Bright Matthews	Dem	Democratic HOLD
46th	Tom Davis	Rep	Tom Davis	Rep	Republican HOLD

== Detailed results ==
- Note: If a district does not list a primary or a runoff, then that district did not have a primary or runoff election (i.e., there may have only been one candidate file for that district).

=== District 1 ===
District 1 covers parts of Oconee and Pickens Counties. Incumbent Thomas C. Alexander ran uncontested in the Republican primary and general election. He was reelected to a sixth full-term in the Senate.

South Carolina Senate District 1 General Election, 2016
Party	Candidate	Votes	%
Republican	Thomas C. Alexander (incumbent)	33,175	99.06
	Write-in	314	0.94
Total votes		33,489	100.0
Republican hold			

=== District 2 ===
District 2 consists of parts of Pickens County. During the Republican primary, incumbent Larry Martin was challenged by three other Republicans, Rex Rice, Dos Joslyn, and Allan Quinn. Initially, Martin came in first with Rice lagging more than 10 percentage points behind. However, since no candidate received a majority of the votes, the election went to a runoff between Martin and Rice. The result was a surprising upset in which Rice defeated Martin, capping his Senate career at 24 years. Martin's loss was attributed to a combination of factors including anti-incumbency fervor and dark money political action committees. In the general election, Rice ran unopposed and was subsequently elected to the Senate.

South Carolina Senate District 2 Republican Primary, 2016
Party	Candidate	Votes	%
Republican	Larry Martin (incumbent)	6,284	45.09
Republican	Rex Rice	4,641	33.30
Republican	Don Joslyn	1,634	11.72
Republican	Allan Quinn	1,378	9.89
Total votes		13,937	100.0

South Carolina Senate District 2 Republican Primary Runoff, 2016
Party	Candidate	Votes	%
Republican	Rex Rice	6,022	54.21
Republican	Larry Martin (incumbent)	5,087	45.79
Total votes		11,109	100.0

South Carolina Senate District 2 General Election, 2016
Party	Candidate	Votes	%
Republican	Rex Rice	36,944	98.64
	Write-in	509	1.36
Total votes		37,453	100.0
Republican hold			

=== District 3 ===
South Carolina Senate District 3 Republican Primary, 2016
Party	Candidate	Votes	%
Republican	Kevin Bryant (incumbent)	7,874	51.20
Republican	Carol Burdette	7,504	48.80
Total votes		15,378	100.0

South Carolina Senate District 3 General Election, 2016
Party	Candidate	Votes	%
Republican	Kevin Bryant (incumbent)	40,287	98.17
	Write-in	753	1.83
Total votes		41,040	100.0
Republican hold			

=== District 4 ===
District 4 is made up of parts of Abbeville, Anderson and Greenwood Counties. Republican Rockey Burgess challenged Gambrell for a second time after losing to him just a few months prior during the special election. In the general election, Gambrell won an uncontested race and was elected to his first full term.

South Carolina Senate District 4 Republican Primary, 2016
Party	Candidate	Votes	%
Republican	Michael Gambrell (incumbent)	6,075	64.95
Republican	Rockey Burgess	3,279	35.05
Total votes		9,354	100.0

South Carolina Senate District 4 General Election, 2016
Party	Candidate	Votes	%
Republican	Michael Gambrell (incumbent)	28,064	99.15
	Write-in	242	0.85
Total votes		28,306	100.0
Republican hold			

=== District 5 ===
South Carolina Senate District 5 Republican Primary, 2016
Party	Candidate	Votes	%
Republican	Tom Corbin (incumbent)	5,442	51.54
Republican	John B. White	5,116	48.46
Total votes		10,558	100.0

South Carolina Senate District 5 General Election, 2016
Party	Candidate	Votes	%
Republican	Tom Corbin (incumbent)	39,364	98.98
	Write-in	405	1.02
Total votes		39,769	100.0
Republican hold			

=== District 6 ===
South Carolina Senate District 6 Republican Primary, 2016
Party	Candidate	Votes	%
Republican	William Timmons	4,880	49.51
Republican	Mike Fair (incumbent)	3,578	36.30
Republican	Johnny Edwards	1,399	14.19
Total votes		9,857	100.0

South Carolina Senate District 6 Republican Primary Runoff, 2016
Party	Candidate	Votes	%
Republican	William Timmons	6,250	65.32
Republican	Mike Fair (incumbent)	3,318	34.68
Total votes		9,568	100.0

South Carolina Senate District 6 General Election, 2016
Party	Candidate	Votes	%
Republican	William Timmons	31,732	84.46
Constitution	Roy G. Magnuson	5,556	14.79
	Write-in	283	0.75
Total votes		37,571	100.0
Republican hold			

=== District 7 ===
South Carolina Senate District 7 Democratic Primary, 2016
Party	Candidate	Votes	%
Democratic	Karl B. Allen (incumbent)	2,749	71.07
Democratic	Lillian Brock Flemming	1,119	28.93
Total votes		3,868	100.0

South Carolina Senate District 7 General Election, 2016
Party	Candidate	Votes	%
Democratic	Karl B. Allen (incumbent)	21,518	61.86
Republican	Glen L. Robinson	13,209	37.98
	Write-in	56	0.16
Total votes		34,783	100.0
Democratic hold			

=== District 8 ===
South Carolina Senate District 8 General Election, 2016
Party	Candidate	Votes	%
Republican	Ross Turner (incumbent)	42,425	98.59
	Write-in	606	1.41
Total votes		43,031	100.0
Republican hold			

=== District 9 ===
South Carolina Senate District 9 General Election, 2016
Party	Candidate	Votes	%
Republican	Danny Verdin (incumbent)	32,168	98.85
	Write-in	374	1.15
Total votes		32,542	100.0
Republican hold			

=== District 10 ===
South Carolina Senate District 10 General Election, 2016
Party	Candidate	Votes	%
Democratic	Floyd Nicholson (incumbent)	19,331	51.29
Republican	J. Bryan Hope	18,342	48.67
	Write-in	14	0.04
Total votes		37,687	100.0
Democratic hold			

=== District 11 ===
South Carolina Senate District 11 General Election, 2016
Party	Candidate	Votes	%
Democratic	Glenn Reese (incumbent)	20,825	54.69
Republican	Cornelius D. Huff	17,225	45.24
	Write-in	27	0.07
Total votes			100.0
Democratic hold			

=== District 12 ===
South Carolina Senate District 12 Republican Primary, 2016
Party	Candidate	Votes	%
Republican	Lee Bright (incumbent)	3,681	37.69
Republican	Scott Talley	2,594	26.56
Republican	David McCraw	2,241	22.95
Republican	Lisa C. Scott	1,250	12.80
Total votes		9,766	100.0

South Carolina Senate District 12 Republican Primary Runoff, 2016
Party	Candidate	Votes	%
Republican	Scott Talley	4,863	51.60
Republican	Lee Bright (incumbent)	4,562	48.40
Total votes		9,425	100.0

South Carolina Senate District 12 General Election, 2016
Party	Candidate	Votes	%
Republican	Scott Talley	41,352	98.36
	Write-in	688	1.64
Total votes		42,040	100.0
Republican hold			

=== District 13 ===
South Carolina Senate District 13 General Election, 2016
Party	Candidate	Votes	%
Republican	Shane Martin (incumbent)	36,239	98.93
	Write-in	391	1.07
Total votes		36,630	100.0
Republican hold			

=== District 14 ===
South Carolina Senate District 14 Republican Primary, 2016
Party	Candidate	Votes	%
Republican	Harvey Peeler (incumbent)	5,196	82.87
Republican	Kenny Price	1,074	17.13
Total votes		6,270	100.0

South Carolina Senate District 14 General Election, 2016
Party	Candidate	Votes	%
Republican	Harvey Peeler (incumbent)	36,427	99.09
	Write-in	334	0.91
Total votes		36,761	100.0
Republican hold			

=== District 15 ===
South Carolina Senate District 15 Republican Primary, 2016
Party	Candidate	Votes	%
Republican	Wes Climer	4,993	51.82
Republican	Wes Hayes (incumbent)	4,643	48.18
Total votes		9,636	100.0

South Carolina Senate District 15 General Election, 2016
Party	Candidate	Votes	%
Republican	Wes Climer	39,584	98.05
	Write-in	789	1.95
Total votes		40,373	100.0
Republican hold			

=== District 16 ===
South Carolina Senate District 16 General Election, 2016
Party	Candidate	Votes	%
Republican	Greg Gregory (incumbent)	44,508	98.84
	Write-in	523	1.16
Total votes		45,031	100.0
Republican hold			

=== District 17 ===
South Carolina Senate District 17 Democratic Primary, 2016
Party	Candidate	Votes	%
Democratic	Creighton Coleman (incumbent)	4,760	49.02
Democratic	Mike Fanning	4,339	44.68
Democratic	Morgan Reeves	612	6.30
Total votes		9,711	100.0

South Carolina Senate District 17 Democratic Primary Runoff, 2016
Party	Candidate	Votes	%
Democratic	Mike Fanning	4,681	56.28
Democratic	Creighton Coleman (incumbent)	3,637	43.72
Total votes		8,318	100.0

South Carolina Senate District 17 General Election, 2016
Party	Candidate	Votes	%
Democratic	Mike Fanning	23,735	53.26
Republican	Mark Palmer	20,762	46.59
	Write-in	68	0.15
Total votes		44,565	100.0
Democratic hold			

=== District 18 ===
South Carolina Senate District 18 General Election, 2016
Party	Candidate	Votes	%
Republican	Ronnie Cromer (incumbent)	43,288	99.09
	Write-in	399	0.91
Total votes		43,687	100.0
Republican hold			

=== District 19 ===
South Carolina Senate District 19 Democratic Primary, 2016
Party	Candidate	Votes	%
Democratic	John L. Scott, Jr (incumbent)	5,833	61.89
Democratic	Torrey Rush	3,592	38.11
Total votes		9,425	100.0

South Carolina Senate District 19 General Election, 2016
Party	Candidate	Votes	%
Democratic	John L. Scott, Jr. (incumbent)	35,946	99.31
	Write-in	251	0.69
Total votes		36,197	100.0
Democratic hold			

=== District 20 ===
Republican incumbent John Courson was challenged by Green Party candidate Scott West.

South Carolina Senate District 20 General Election, 2016
Party	Candidate	Votes	%
Republican	John Courson (incumbent)	30,267	74.50
Green	Scott Lewis West	10,166	25.02
	Write-in	196	0.48
Total votes		40,629	100.0
Republican hold			

=== District 21 ===
South Carolina Senate District 21 Democratic Primary, 2016
Party	Candidate	Votes	%
Democratic	Darrell Jackson (incumbent)	6,289	61.76
Democratic	Wendy C. Brawley	3,894	38.24
Total votes		10,183	100.0

South Carolina Senate District 21 General Election, 2016
Party	Candidate	Votes	%
Democratic	Darrell Jackson (incumbent)	30,294	98.81
	Write-in	366	1.19
Total votes		30,660	100.0
Democratic hold			

=== District 22 ===
South Carolina Senate District 22 General Election, 2016
Party	Candidate	Votes	%
Democratic	Mia McLeod	26,530	54.94
Republican	Susan Brill	21,696	44.93
	Write-in	61	0.13
Total votes		48,287	100.0
Democratic hold			

=== District 23 ===
South Carolina Senate District 23 Republican Primary, 2016
Party	Candidate	Votes	%
Republican	Katrina Shealy (incumbent)	4,386	61.89
Republican	Michael Sturkie	2,095	29.56
Republican	Patricia Wheat	606	8.55
Total votes		7,087	100.0

South Carolina Senate District 23 General Election, 2016
Party	Candidate	Votes	%
Republican	Katrina Shealy (incumbent)	32,393	98.62
	Write-in	453	1.38
Total votes		32,846	100.0
Republican hold			

=== District 24 ===
South Carolina Senate District 24 General Election, 2016
Party	Candidate	Votes	%
Republican	Tom Young (incumbent)	38,279	99.00
	Write-in	387	1.00
Total votes		38,666	100.0
Republican hold			

=== District 25 ===
South Carolina Senate District 25 Republican Primary, 2016
Party	Candidate	Votes	%
Republican	Shane Massey (incumbent)	5,597	58.85
Republican	John Pettigrew	3,913	41.15
Total votes		9,510	100.0

South Carolina Senate District 25 General Election, 2016
Party	Candidate	Votes	%
Republican	Shane Massey (incumbent)	34,890	98.99
	Write-in	356	1.01
Total votes		35,246	100.0
Republican hold			

=== District 26 ===
South Carolina Senate District 26 General Election, 2016
Party	Candidate	Votes	%
Democratic	Nikki Setzler (incumbent)	21,702	58.43
Republican	Brad Lindsey	15,392	41.44
	Write-in	48	0.13
Total votes		37,142	100.0
Democratic hold			

=== District 27 ===
South Carolina Senate District 27 General Election, 2016
Party	Candidate	Votes	%
Democratic	Vincent Sheheen (incumbent)	27,101	98.36
	Write-in	451	1.64
Total votes		27,552	100.0
Democratic hold			

=== District 28 ===
South Carolina Senate District 28 General Election, 2016
Party	Candidate	Votes	%
Republican	Greg Hembree (incumbent)	35,257	99.32
	Write-in	243	0.68
Total votes		35,500	100.0
Republican hold			

=== District 29 ===
South Carolina Senate District 29 General Election, 2016
Party	Candidate	Votes	%
Democratic	Gerald Malloy (incumbent)	28,519	98.09
	Write-in	556	1.91
Total votes		29,075	100.0
Democratic hold			

=== District 30 ===
South Carolina Senate District 30 Democratic Primary, 2016
Party	Candidate	Votes	%
Democratic	Kent Williams (incumbent)	13,041	79.52
Democratic	Patrick T. Richardson	3,359	20.48
Total votes		16,400	100.0

South Carolina Senate District 30 General Election, 2016
Party	Candidate	Votes	%
Democratic	Kent Williams (incumbent)	31,560	99.25
	Write-in	237	0.75
Total votes		31,797	100.0
Democratic hold			

=== District 31 ===
South Carolina Senate District 31 Republican Primary, 2016
Party	Candidate	Votes	%
Republican	Hugh Leatherman (incumbent)	5,948	54.23
Republican	Richard E. Skipper	4,462	40.68
Republican	Dean Fowler, Jr.	558	5.09
Total votes		10,968	100.0

South Carolina Senate District 31 General Election, 2016
Party	Candidate	Votes	%
Republican	Hugh Leatherman (incumbent)	32,439	98.26
	Write-in	575	1.74
Total votes		33,014	100.0
Republican hold			

=== District 32 ===
South Carolina Senate District 32 General Election, 2016
Party	Candidate	Votes	%
Democratic	Ronnie A. Sabb (incumbent)	31,164	98.69
	Write-in	415	1.31
Total votes		31,579	100.0
Democratic hold			

=== District 33 ===
South Carolina Senate District 33 Republican Primary, 2016
Party	Candidate	Votes	%
Republican	Luke Rankin (incumbent)	5,015	55.88
Republican	Scott Pyle	3,959	44.12
Total votes		8,974	100.0

South Carolina Senate District 33 General Election, 2016
Party	Candidate	Votes	%
Republican	Luke Rankin (incumbent)	36,270	98.80
	Write-in	442	1.20
Total votes		36,712	100.0
Republican hold			

=== District 34 ===
South Carolina Senate District 34 Republican Primary, 2016
Party	Candidate	Votes	%
Republican	Stephen Goldfinch	3,233	42.65
Republican	Reese Boyd	3,096	40.84
Republican	Joe Ford	852	11.24
Republican	Dick Withington	400	5.28
Total votes		7,581	100.0

South Carolina Senate District 34 Republican Primary Runoff, 2016
Party	Candidate	Votes	%
Republican	Stephen Goldfinch	2,804	52.49
Republican	Reese Boyd	2,538	47.51
Total votes		5,342	100.0

South Carolina Senate District 34 General Election, 2016
Party	Candidate	Votes	%
Republican	Stephen Goldfinch	45,945	98.87
	Write-in	525	1.13
Total votes		46,470	100.0
Republican hold			

=== District 35 ===
South Carolina Senate District 35 General Election, 2016
Party	Candidate	Votes	%
Democratic	Thomas McElveen (incumbent)	31,113	98.66
	Write-in	423	1.34
Total votes		31,536	100.0
Democratic hold			

=== District 36 ===
South Carolina Senate District 36 General Election, 2016
Party	Candidate	Votes	%
Democratic	Kevin L. Johnson (incumbent)	24,725	62.16
Republican	Leon Winn	15,024	37.77
	Write-in	29	0.07
Total votes		39,778	100.0
Democratic hold			

=== District 37 ===
South Carolina Senate District 37 Republican Primary, 2016
Party	Candidate	Votes	%
Republican	Larry Grooms (incumbent)	3,550	79.47
Republican	Mark Robin Heath	917	20.53
Total votes		4,467	100.0

South Carolina Senate District 37 General Election, 2016
Party	Candidate	Votes	%
Republican	Larry Grooms (incumbent)	39,314	98.34
	Write-in	663	1.66
Total votes		39,977	100.0
Republican hold			

=== District 38 ===
South Carolina Senate District 38 Republican Primary, 2016
Party	Candidate	Votes	%
Republican	Sean Bennett (incumbent)	5,740	63.82
Republican	Evan Guthrie	3,254	36.18
Total votes		8,994	100.0

South Carolina Senate District 38 General Election, 2016
Party	Candidate	Votes	%
Republican	Sean Bennett (incumbent)	34,034	98.44
	Write-in	541	1.56
Total votes		34,575	100.0
Republican hold			

=== District 39 ===
South Carolina Senate District 39 General Election, 2016
Party	Candidate	Votes	%
Democratic	John Matthews (incumbent)	30,716	98.91
	Write-in	338	1.09
Total votes		31,054	100.0
Democratic hold			

=== District 40 ===
South Carolina Senate District 40 General Election, 2016
Party	Candidate	Votes	%
Democratic	Brad Hutto (incumbent)	34,069	99.03
	Write-in	333	0.97
Total votes		34,402	100.0
Democratic hold			

=== District 41 ===
South Carolina Senate District 41 Republican Primary, 2016
Party	Candidate	Votes	%
Republican	Sandy Senn	2,679	39.75
Republican	Roy Maybank	1,569	23.28
Republican	Tim Mallard	1,231	18.26
Republican	Culver Kidd	1,106	16.41
Republican	Joe Qualey	155	2.30
Total votes		6,740	100.0

South Carolina Senate District 41 Republican Primary Runoff, 2016
Party	Candidate	Votes	%
Republican	Sandy Senn	2,564	57.77
Republican	Roy Maybank	1,874	42.23
Total votes		4,438	100.0

South Carolina Senate District 41 General Election, 2016
Party	Candidate	Votes	%
Republican	Sandy Senn	39,313	97.84
	Write-in	867	2.16
Total votes		40,180	100.0
Republican hold			

=== District 42 ===
South Carolina Senate District 42 Democratic Primary, 2016
Party	Candidate	Votes	%
Democratic	Marlon Kimpson (incumbent)	3,648	78.96
Democratic	Robert Ford	972	21.04
Total votes		4,620	100.0

South Carolina Senate District 42 General Election, 2016
Party	Candidate	Votes	%
Democratic	Marlon Kimpson (incumbent)	29,289	98.95
	Write-in	312	1.05
Total votes		29,601	100.0
Democratic hold			

=== District 43 ===
South Carolina Senate District 43 General Election, 2016
Party	Candidate	Votes	%
Republican	Chip Campsen (incumbent)	39,056	98.16
	Write-in	732	1.84
Total votes		39,788	100.0
Republican hold			

=== District 44 ===
South Carolina Senate District 44 General Election, 2016
Party	Candidate	Votes	%
Republican	Paul G. Campbell, Jr. (incumbent)	30,795	98.13
	Write-in	588	1.87
Total votes		31,383	100.0
Republican hold			

=== District 45 ===
South Carolina Senate District 45 General Election, 2016
Party	Candidate	Votes	%
Democratic	Margie Bright Matthews (incumbent)	29,994	98.70
	Write-in	395	1.30
Total votes		30,389	100.0
Democratic hold			

=== District 46 ===
South Carolina Senate District 46 General Election, 2016
Party	Candidate	Votes	%
Republican	Tom Davis (incumbent)	42,931	98.86
	Write-in	494	1.14
Total votes		43,425	100.0
Republican hold			

== See also ==
- 2016 South Carolina elections
- 2016 United States House of Representatives elections in South Carolina
- Elections in South Carolina
