= Abortion in South Carolina =

Abortion in South Carolina is illegal after detection of a fetal heartbeat, usually around 6 weeks from the woman's last menstrual period, when many women are not yet aware that they are pregnant. On May 25, 2023, Governor Henry McMaster signed a 6-week ban, and it took effect immediately. The ban was blocked in court the next day but was reinstated by the South Carolina Supreme Court on August 23.

In January 2023, the South Carolina Supreme Court had struck down a similar existing law as violating the state's privacy clause under Article 1, Section 10 of the South Carolina Constitution. Passed in 2021, that law had criminalized abortion once embryonic cardiac activity is detectable, which is around five or six weeks after the first day of the woman's last menstrual period. In 2024, South Carolina lawmakers introduced a bill that would define abortion as "prenatal homicide"; and make abortion patients eligible for the death penalty.

The number of abortion clinics in South Carolina has fluctuated over the years, with fifteen in 1982, eighteen in 1992 and three in 2014. There were 5,714 legal abortions in 2014, and 5,778 in 2015.

In 2022, when a political campaign polled South Carolina adults, it found that 53% support "a woman’s right to choose to have a safe and legal abortion" while 37% do not.

== History ==
South Carolinian women have a long history of traveling outside the state to seek legal abortions. Critics of efforts by state lawmakers to restrict abortion access say it results in South Carolinian women needing to spend more money and travel greater distances for the procedure.

In the year following the overturn of Roe v. Wade in 2022, 210 pregnant women in a dozen states were criminally charged for conduct associated with their pregnancy, pregnancy loss or birth. Six states — Alabama, Mississippi, Ohio, Oklahoma, South Carolina and Texas — accounted for most cases.

On June 2, 2023, 22-year old Amari Marsh, who was attending South Carolina State University, was arrested and improperly charged with homicide after experiencing a miscarriage that March. She spent 22 days in jail and was released to house arrest before her case was cleared by a grand jury.

On July 3, 2025, a 31-year old woman was arrested in Florence County, South Carolina after experiencing a miscarriage and disposing of the fetal remains in the trash. If convicted, she faces up to 10 years in prison.

=== Legislative history ===
By the end of the 1800s, all states in the Union except Louisiana had therapeutic exceptions in their legislative bans on abortions. In the 19th century, bans by state legislatures on abortion were about protecting the life of the mother given the number of deaths caused by abortions; state governments saw themselves as looking out for the lives of their citizens. By 1950, the state legislature would pass a law that stated that a woman who had an abortion or actively sought to have an abortion regardless of whether she went through with it was guilty of a criminal offense.

The state was one of 23 states in 2007 to have a detailed abortion-specific informed consent requirement. In 2013, state Targeted Regulation of Abortion Providers (TRAP) law applied to medication induced abortions and private doctor offices in addition to abortion clinics. Governor Nikki Haley signed legislation that brought into effect a 20-week abortion ban in 2016. At a ceremonial signing ceremony for the cameras, she was surrounded by children with disabilities.

Republican Representative Greg Delleney was the lead sponsor of South Carolina's law requiring that women view an ultrasound of a fetus before being allowed to have an abortion. He said the ultrasound would enable the woman to "determine for herself whether she is carrying an unborn child deserving of protection or whether it's just an inconvenient, unnecessary part of her body." Rep. John R. McCravy III prefiled HB 3020 in the South Carolina House of Representatives in December 2018. The bill, entitled the "Fetal Heartbeat Protection from Abortion Act", was introduced on January 8, 2018, and referred to the House Judiciary Committee. Previous attempts to pass "fetal heartbeat" bills in the South Carolina General Assembly failed. The state legislature was one of ten states nationwide that tried to pass similar legislation that year. In April 2019, by a vote of 70–31, the S.C. House of Representatives passed a "fetal heartbeat" bill. The measure passed after five hours of debate.

In February 2021, South Carolina passed a law which would outlaw almost all abortions in that state after embryonic cardiac-cell activity is detected; however, that law was temporarily blocked by a judge in March 2021. Representatives from The American College of Obstetricians and Gynecologists (ACOG) stated in a September 2021 Senate hearing that "contemporary ultrasound can detect an electrically induced flickering of a portion of the embryonic tissue," which differs structurally and functionally from both the lay understanding and medical definition of the term "fetus", "heart" and "heartbeat." The state Supreme Court later struck down the law.

In September 2022, the South Carolina Legislature failed in an attempt to ban abortion at fertilization due to objections from female legislators for being too strict. The legislature then failed to make stricter the state's existing 6-week abortion ban due to objections from the caucus that the proposed new law wasn't strict enough.

In February 2023, Larry Grooms, A. Shane Massey, Josh Kimbrell, and Brian Adams (politician) authored Bill 474, the "Fetal Heartbeat and Protection from Abortion" Act, which outlaws almost all abortions in the state after embryonic cardiac-cell activity is detected. South Carolina entered it into law on May 25, 2023, despite its similarity to 2021's fetal heartbeat law the state Supreme Court struck down. The law generally banned abortion once there is "cardiac activity, or the steady and repetitive rhythmic contraction of the fetal heart, within the gestational sac". The supposed "cardiac activity" is not a heartbeat, instead being embryonic electrical activity, which can be detected from around six weeks from the woman's last menstrual period. Many women do not yet know that they are pregnant at six weeks since the woman's last menstrual period.

In 2023, Republican Representative Rob Harris authored the South Carolina Prenatal Equal Protection Act of 2023, which would make women who had abortions eligible for the death penalty. The bill attracted 21 Republican co-sponsors. The bill would define fertilized eggs as human beings and offers no exception for pregnant individuals seeking abortion due to sexual assault, incest, or poor fetal health. Harris reintroduced the bill in 2024.

In April 2023, 5 State Senators filibustered an almost total abortion ban in a bipartisan group.

=== Judicial history ===
The US Supreme Court's decision in 1973's Roe v. Wade ruling meant the state could no longer regulate abortion in the first trimester. (However, the Supreme Court overturned Roe v. Wade in Dobbs v. Jackson Women's Health Organization, No. 19-1392, 597 U.S. 215 (2022) later in 2022.) The US Supreme Court heard Ferguson v. City of Charleston in 2001. On appeal, the Fourth Circuit had affirmed, but on the ground that the searches were justified as a matter of law by special non-law-enforcement needs. The Supreme Court had a 6–3 ruling in the case, which was about a South Carolina public hospital policy requiring all pregnant women to be drug tested. The Supreme Court ruled that the US Constitution's Fourth Amendment protected women against unreasonable search and seizures, which mandatory drug testing was. The US Supreme Court reasoned that the interest in curtailing pregnancy complications and reducing the medical costs associated with maternal cocaine use outweighed what it characterized as a "minimal intrusion" on the women's privacy. The Supreme Court then agreed to hear the case. Justice Kennedy pointed out that all searches, by definition, would uncover evidence of crime, and this says nothing about the "special needs" the search might serve. In this case, however, Kennedy agreed that "while the policy may well have served legitimate needs unrelated to law enforcement, it had as well a penal character with a far greater connection to law enforcement than other searches sustained under our special needs rationale."

In Planned Parenthood South Atlantic, et al. v. State of South Carolina, et al., the South Carolina Supreme Court struck down the state's six-week abortion ban from 2021 and ruled that the state constitution's privacy clause included an implicit right to abortion.

A day after South Carolina's 2023 abortion law was implemented, Circuit Court Judge Clifton Newman issued a temporary restraining order that prevents the law from being enforced until the state supreme court can make a ruling on the law's constitutionality.

In August 2023, the South Carolina Supreme Court ruled that the state's 2023 law, banning most abortions after cardiac activity is detected, is constitutional.

In June 2025, the US Supreme Court ruled that a South Carolina woman and Planned Parenthood lack legal standing to challenge the state’s decision to exclude Planned Parenthood from its Medicaid program due to its abortion services.

=== Clinic history ===
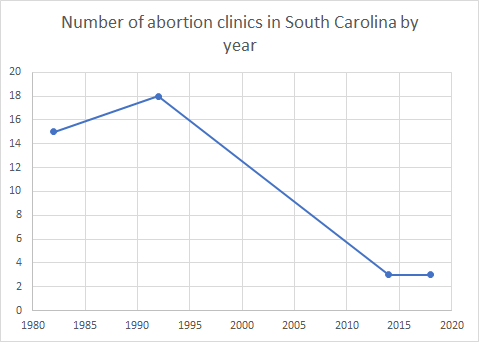
Number of abortion clinics in South Carolina by year

Between 1982 and 1992, the number of abortion clinics in the state increased by three, going from fifteen in 1982 to eighteen in 1992. In 2014, there were three abortion clinics in the state. In 2014, 93% of the counties in the state did not have an abortion clinic. That year, 71% of women in the state aged 15–44 lived in a county without an abortion clinic. In 2017, there were two Planned Parenthood clinics, one of which offered abortion services, in a state with a population of 1,112,199 women aged 15–49. In 2018, there were three licensed abortion clinics in the state. They were in Charleston, Columbia and Greenville. The Charleston clinic was a Planned Parenthood clinic in West Ashley.

== Statistics ==
In the period between 1972 and 1974, the state had an illegal abortion mortality rate per million women aged 15–44 of between 0.1 and 0.9. In 1990, 411,000 women in the state faced the risk of an unintended pregnancy. There were around 5,600 women in South Carolina in 1995 who left the state to get an abortion. There were around 8,801 abortions performed in South Carolina in 1998.

In 2010, the state had nine publicly funded abortions, of which all were federally funded and none were state funded. In 2013, among white women aged 15–19, there were 660 abortions, 620 abortions for black women aged 15–19, 60 abortions for Hispanic women aged 15–19, and 40 abortions for women of all other races. In 2014, 42% of adults said in a poll by the Pew Research Center that abortion should be legal in all or most cases.

Around 5,600 women in South Carolina in 2015 left the state to get an abortion. This number was one of the highest in the United States. Only 5.9% of abortions performed in the state involved out-of-state residents in 2015. This contrasted with neighboring Georgia, where 14.5% of all abortions that year were for out-of-state residents, and neighboring North Carolina, where 7.5% of all abortions were for out-of-state residents. In 2017, nearly 11,000 South Carolina residents had abortions, but more than half of those were performed out of state. That year, South Carolina had an infant mortality rate of 6.5 deaths per 1,000 live births.

Number of reported abortions, abortion rate and percentage change in rate by geographic region and state in 1992, 1995 and 1996
Census division and state	Number			Rate			% change 1992–1996
Census division and state	1992	1995	1996	1992	1995	1996	% change 1992–1996
South Atlantic	269,200	261,990	263,600	25.9	24.6	24.7	–5
Delaware	5,730	5,790	4,090	35.2	34.4	24.1	–32
District of Columbia	21,320	21,090	20,790	138.4	151.7	154.5	12
Florida	84,680	87,500	94,050	30	30	32	7
Georgia	39,680	36,940	37,320	24	21.2	21.1	–12
Maryland	31,260	30,520	31,310	26.4	25.6	26.3	0
North Carolina	36,180	34,600	33,550	22.4	21	20.2	–10
South Carolina	12,190	11,020	9,940	14.2	12.9	11.6	–19
Virginia	35,020	31,480	29,940	22.7	20	18.9	–16
West Virginia	3,140	3,050	2,610	7.7	7.6	6.6	–14

Number, rate, and ratio of reported abortions, by reporting area of residence and occurrence and by percentage of abortions obtained by out-of-state residents, US CDC estimates
Location	Residence			Occurrence			% obtained by out-of-state residents	Year	Ref
Location	No.	Rate^	Ratio^^	No.	Rate^	Ratio^^	% obtained by out-of-state residents	Year	Ref
South Carolina	9,774	10.4	170	5,714	6.1	99	5.3	2014	
South Carolina	11,032	11.6	190	5,778	6.1	99	5.9	2015	
South Carolina	10,773	11,2	188	5,736	6.0	100	5.4	2016	
^number of abortions per 1,000 women aged 15–44; ^^number of abortions per 1,000 live births

== Abortion rights views and activities ==
=== Protests ===
Protesters participated in marches supporting abortion rights as part of a Stop the Bans movement in May 2019.

Following the overturn of Roe v. Wade on June 24, 2022, an abortion rights protest was held on June 25 in Greenville.

In Columbia, South Carolina on May 15, 2023, a group of abortion rights protesters rallied at the South Carolina statehouse in opposition to the state's 6-week abortion ban.

In Columbia, South Carolina on October 1, 2025, protesters rallied and spoke out against Bill S.323, which would have banned abortion in the state with almost no exceptions, banned some forms of birth control such as IUD's and emergency contraception, banned IVF and sought homicide charges and the death penalty for anyone who obtained an abortion. The bill failed to advance out of subcommittee, following statewide and nationwide backlash.

== Anti-abortion views and activities ==
=== Views ===
Between 1998 and 2017, the number of abortions that took place on a yearly basis in the state dropped by 5,112. According to anti-abortion rights group South Carolina Citizens for Life this drop meant that harsh anti-abortion measures in the state worked. According to South Carolina Citizens Executive Director Holly Gatling in regards to the number of women seeking abortions outside the state over the same period remaining unchanged, "South Carolina Citizens for Life is responsible for South Carolina, not for any other state where women who claim to be from South Carolina abort their children. [...] All we can do is work to reduce the number of abortions occurring in South Carolina, and we have done that and continue to do so."

Governor Nikki Haley said in 2016, "I'm not pro-life because the Republican Party tells me. [...] I'm pro-life because all of us have had experiences of what it means to have one of these special little ones in our life."

Charleston Republican Senator Larry Grooms said in 2018, "I believe that all life is sacred, that an unborn child has a right to life, just like a child that has already experienced birth."

South Carolina state Rep. Nancy Mace said in regard to the six-week "fetal heartbeat" abortion ban in 2019, when on the floor of the House during a 10-minute floor speech about an amendment she introduced, "I was gripping the podium so hard I thought I was going to pull it out of the floor. [...] I was angry at the language my colleagues were using. They were saying rape was the fault of the woman. They called these women baby killers and murderers. That language is so degrading toward women, particularly victims of rape or incest. And I said to myself I'm not going to put up with that bull----. I was nearly yelling into the mic. I gave a very passionate speech to my colleagues and that is what got the exception through."

=== Violence ===
On February 23, 2023, anti-abortion protesters physically clashed with abortion rights protesters outside of a clinic in Greenville, South Carolina. Due to this physical confrontation and over 300 others since the beginning of 2021 that led to 20 arrests at the clinic, in October 2023 the Greenville County Council's Public Safety Committee voted to prohibit firearms, weapons, body armor, open flames, bicycles and the blocking of pedestrian walkways and entrances to businesses at protests.

On November 14, 2025, one person was injured during a shooting outside of a Planned Parenthood in Columbia, South Carolina. Mark Baumgartner, the founder of anti-abortion group "A Moment Of Hope", was arrested and charged with assault and battery of a high and aggravated nature and possession of a weapon during a violent crime.
