= Allen Blackmon =

American politician

Member of the South Carolina Senate from the 27th district
- Incumbent
- Assumed office January 2025
- Preceded by: Penry Gustafson

Personal details
- Born: August 6, 1955 (age 71) Langley Air Force Base; Hampton, Virginia
- Party: Republican
- Education: Clemson University (BS)

Allen Blackmon is a member of the South Carolina Senate representing District 27 (Chesterfield, Kershaw, and Lancaster Counties).

== Political career ==
=== 2024 State Senate race ===
In 2024, Blackmon challenged incumbent senator Penry Gustafson in the Republican primary. The challenge was prompted, in part, by Gustafson's opposition to the state's abortion ban.

Blackmon won the Republican nomination and defeated Democratic nominee Yokima Cureton in the November general election.

Gustafson's defeat occurred alongside the defeats of Republican Senators Katrina Shealy and Sandy Senn, who also opposed the abortion ban.

Blackmon serves on the Senate Banking and Insurance; Fish, Game and Forestry; Judiciary, Rules and Transportation committees.

=== Previous elected office ===
Blackmon previously served as a Lancaster County Councilman, resigning his seat on Council after his primary win.

South Carolina Senate
Preceded by Penry Gustafson	Member of the South Carolina Senate from the 27th district 2025–	Incumbent
