= Wesley Donehue =

Wesley Donehue is an American political strategist and Internet consultant. He is the CEO of Push Digital based in Charleston, South Carolina with a second office in Columbia, South Carolina.

== Biography ==
In late 2007, Donehue built a fake website against Fred Thompson, who was a political opponent to Mitt Romney, which drew national attention. While employed at First Tuesday Strategies, Wesley managed much of Mitt Romney’s South Carolina Internet outreach and tried to cast Fred Thompson in a negative light by creating www.PhoneyFred.org.

Donehue and Phil Bailey host a weekly web show, originally labeled "PNN Happy Hour" and was shot from a local Columbia bar. The name was soon changed to "Pub Politics" and went live on April 22 with State House Representative Bakari Sellers as the political guest. Since then, the Pub Politics has featured numerous guest appearances from the state’s political representatives, local journalists and lobbyists.

On June 3, 2010, South Carolina State Sen. Jake Knotts used the ethnic slur "raghead" to describe President Barack Obama and Republican gubernatorial candidate Nikki Haley while appearing on a live broadcast of Pub Politics. Several people present at the political talk show's broadcast confirmed Knotts said "We already got one raghead in the White House, we don’t need a raghead in the governor's mansion."

The video of Knotts' remarks never made it online - unlike most of Pub Politics' episodes. In a statement, Donehue and Bailey said that what Knotts said does not fit with their program and its goals. A Washington Post report added that, "Conveniently for Knotts - who has been condemned by state Republicans anyway - the lack of the video prevents the story from taking on more steam." The Post added, "What's interesting about this is that Knotts is a close political ally of Rep. Joe Wilson (R-S.C.) - and Donehue, according to FEC reports, has done work for Wilson."

In early 2010, Campaigns and Elections Politics Magazine named Donehue as being a "Rising Star" in the political scene, an award given to those who show promise in the early stages of their career.
