= Ralph Kennedy =

Ralph Kennedy may refer to:

- Ralph Shealy Kennedy Jr. (born 1958), member of the South Carolina House of Representatives
- Ralph Kennedy series, by Mark Clifton
- Ralph Kennedy, character in 555
