= Matt Leber =

American politician

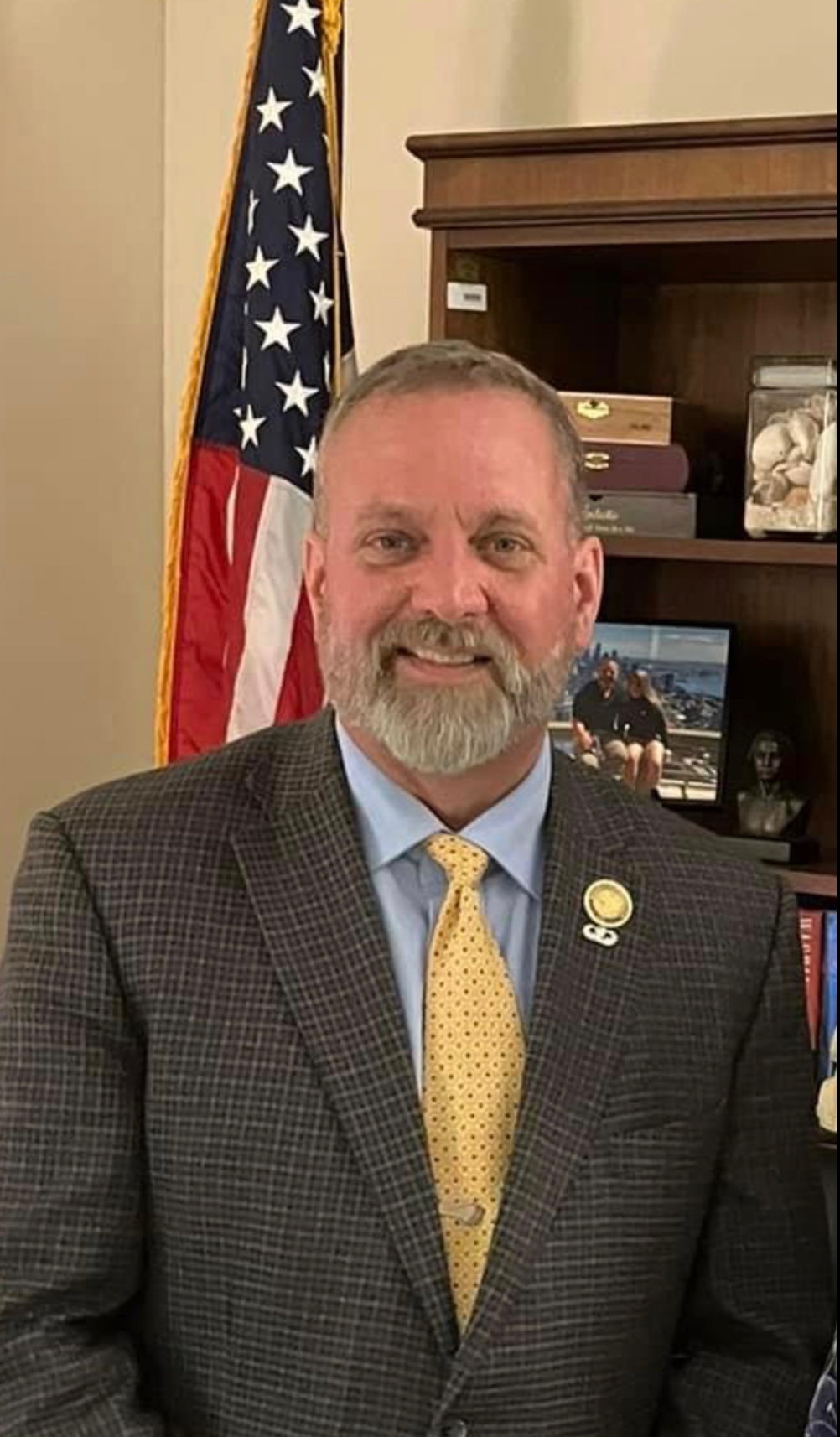
- Leber in 2024

Member of the South Carolina Senate from the 41st district
- Incumbent
- Assumed office November 11, 2024
- Preceded by: Sandy Senn

Member of the South Carolina House of Representatives from the 116th district
- In office November 14, 2022 – November 11, 2024
- Preceded by: Chardale Murray
- Succeeded by: James Teeple

Personal details
- Born: April 5, 1973 (age 53) Washington, North Carolina, U.S.
- Party: Republican
- Spouse: S. Michelle Leber
- Education: Mitchell Community College
- Website: www.leberforsenate.com

Military service
- Allegiance: United States
- Branch/service: United States Army

Matt W. Leber is an American politician and member of the South Carolina State Senate for the 41st district.

== Early life and career ==
Prior to being elected to office, Leber, a combat veteran, served eight years as a paratrooper in the United States Army.

== Political career ==
=== South Carolina State House of Representatives ===
In the 2022 general election for South Carolina House of Representatives District 116, Leber defeated Democratic incumbent Chardale Murray. Representative Leber served as Chairman of the Freshman Caucus, on the House Judiciary Committee, and on the newly formed standing House Committee on Artificial Intelligence (AI).

=== South Carolina State Senate ===
In September 2023, Leber announced his candidacy for South Carolina State Senate District 41. In June 2024, he defeated incumbent Senator Sandy Senn in the Republican Primary to become the Nominee.

Leber faced Democrat Rita Adkins in the general election. On November 5, 2024, he defeated Adkins to become the next Senator.

In August 2025, Leber's wife publicly accused him of engaging in an affair with a paid political consultant, prompting South Carolina Democrats to call for his resignation.

=== Endorsements ===
In April 2023, Leber was the first South Carolina lawmaker to endorse Vivek Ramaswamy in the 2024 presidential election. Leber served as Ramaswamy's State Chair for South Carolina. After Ramaswamy suspended his presidential campaign, Leber joined Ramaswamy in endorsing former President Donald Trump in the 2024 Republican Presidential Primary.

== Positions ==
Leber supports the Second Amendment and has an A rating from the NRA. In 2024, he voted for Constitutional Carry, also known as permitless carry, speaking out against Senate amendments applying increased penalties on non permit holders, calling them unconstitutional and stating, "we cannot have a different class of citizens in America."

Leber sponsored a bill criminalizing the trafficking of fentanyl and was instrumental in pushing it through the House Judiciary Committee. Leber has repeatedly called for increased security along the US Mexico border to combat drug trafficking and has proposed measures to dissuade illegal aliens from coming to South Carolina. During Leber's 2022 House race, State Representative Wendell Gilliard accused Leber of having participated in armed patrols on the US Mexico border and having "direct ties to the Three Percenters".

Matt Leber describes himself as pro-life and voted for the Fetal Heartbeat and Protection from Abortion Act.

Leber supports term limits.
