= Paul G. Campbell Jr. =

American politician

Member of the South Carolina Senate from the 44th district
- In office 2007–2020
- Preceded by: Tommy Moore (politician)
- Succeeded by: Brian Adams (politician)

Personal details
- Born: July 10, 1946 (age 80) West Jefferson, North Carolina, U.S.
- Party: Republican
- Spouse: Vicki Garner Campbell
- Profession: Businessman

Paul G. Campbell Jr. (born July 10, 1946) was a Republican member of the South Carolina Senate, representing the 44th District from 2007 to 2020. He is an alumnus of Clemson University.

In November 2017, he was arrested for allegedly driving under the influence of alcohol and giving false evidence to police (in saying that he was not in charge of the vehicle in question). This was never proven to be true in a court of law, making this information included above a recount of what original charges were made but not proven to be fact. Magistrate Elbert Duffie dismissed his case.
