= Chardale Murray =

American politician (born 1975)

Mayor of Hollywood, South Carolina
- In office July 2023 – present
- Preceded by: John Dunmyer III

Member of the South Carolina House of Representatives from the 116th district
- In office November 9, 2020 – November 14, 2022
- Preceded by: Robert Brown
- Succeeded by: Matt Leber

Personal details
- Born: November 29, 1975 (age 50) Charleston, South Carolina
- Party: Democratic
- Education: University of South Carolina (M.S.)
- Profession: mortuary owner

Chardale R. Murray is an American politician currently serving as the Mayor of Hollywood, South Carolina. She is a former member of the South Carolina House of Representatives from the 116th District, serving from 2020 to 2022, and she was the first woman to represent the District. She is a member of the Democratic Party.

== Political career ==
=== 2020 House of Representatives race ===
Murray, endorsed by retiring incumbent Robert Brown, won the Democratic primary and defeated Republican nominee Carroll O'Neal.

=== 2022 House of Representatives race ===
Murray was defeated by Republican Matt Leber in the 2022 general election.

=== 2023 Mayoral race ===
On April 12, 2023 Murray announced her run for Mayor of Hollywood, South Carolina. On Election Day June 6, 2023, Murray received 468 votes, defeating incumbent John Dunmyer III, who received 308 votes, and another challenger Mayor Pro-Tem Althea Salters, who received 74 votes.

== Electoral history ==
=== South Carolina House of Representatives ===
District 116
Year	Candidate	Votes	Pct	Candidate	Votes	Pct	Candidate	Votes	Pct	Candidate	Votes	Pct
2020 Democratic Primary	Chardale Murray	2,691	57.9&	Millicent T. Middleton	907	19.5%	Charles Glover Sr.	531	11.4%	John Prioleau Sr.	518	11.1%
2020 General Election	Chardale Murray	12,227	50.8%	Carroll O'Neal	11,809	49.0%	Write-in	42	0.2%			
