= Jake Knotts =

American politician

John M. Knotts, Jr.

Member of the South Carolina Senate from the 23rd district
- In office 2002–2012
- Preceded by: Joe Wilson
- Succeeded by: Katrina Shealy

Member of the South Carolina House of Representatives from the 88th district
- In office 1994–2002
- Preceded by: C. Lenoir Sturkie
- Succeeded by: Mac Toole

Personal details
- Born: December 12, 1944 (age 81) West Columbia, South Carolina, U.S.
- Party: Republican
- Spouse: Betty Lee
- Profession: law enforcement

John Milton "Jake" Knotts, Jr. (born December 12, 1944) is a former Republican member of the South Carolina Senate, representing the 23rd District from 2002 to 2012. Previously he was a member of the South Carolina House of Representatives from 1994 through 2002.

== Early life ==
Knotts was born in December 1944 in West Columbia, South Carolina, the son of John Milton, Sr. and Dovereen Jessie (Williams) Knotts. He was the child of a poverty-stricken family and raised as Jakie Webster until he was told his real name at age 12. Knotts served in the Navy. Following his service, Knotts worked as a police officer for the Columbia Police Department, a detective, and an assistant coroner before entering politics. Knotts married Betty Lee in 1965, with whom he has two children, Michelle Nicole and Tara Marie.

== Political career ==
Knotts was a prominent critic of governor and fellow Republican Mark Sanford and was a leading critic of the governor following his disappearance and admission of an extramarital affair.

Knotts was defeated for re-election in the 2012 general election by Katrina Shealy, a Republican petition candidate who he had defeated in the 2008 Republican primary.

=== Committee assignments ===
Knotts served on the following committees in the state senate:

- Agriculture and Natural Resources
- Fish, Game and Forestry
- General
- Invitations (Chairman)
- Judiciary
- Rules

== Controversies ==
=== "Raghead" comment ===
On June 3, 2010, Knotts used the word "raghead" to describe President Barack Obama and Republican gubernatorial candidate (and fellow Lexington County resident) Nikki Haley while appearing on a live broadcast of Pub Politics. Several people present at the political talk show's broadcast confirmed Knotts said "We already got one raghead in the White House, we don’t need a raghead in the governor's mansion." Haley was raised as a Sikh and later converted to Christianity. Haley has stated she attends services of both faiths.

Other South Carolina Republicans were quick to distance themselves from Knotts and called for an apology. Knotts later issued a statement, saying, "Since my intended humorous context was lost in translation, I apologize. I still believe Ms Haley is pretending to be someone she is not, much as Obama did, but I apologize to both for an unintended slur." Haley campaign manager Tim Pearson called Knotts "an embarrassment to our state and to the Republican Party."

After Knotts' controversial remarks, former Lexington County Republican Party chairwoman Katrina Shealy announced a primary candidacy to challenge Jake Knotts in 2012. On June 10, the Lexington County Republican Party voted to censure Knotts and asked him to resign from office, by a vote of 26 to 7. Knotts reiterated that he would not resign, saying "I'm truly, deeply sorry I used those words and there was no intention for them to be interpreted to be prejudice."

In a 2021 interview, Knotts said again that Haley "wasn't a real Christian" and had "converted for political purposes".

== Honors and recognitions ==
In April 2020, a House resolution was passed honoring Knotts.

A bridge crossing Lake Murray is named for Jake Knotts.
