= Penry Gustafson =

American politician (born 1970)

Member of the South Carolina Senate from the 27th district
- In office January 2021 – November 2024
- Preceded by: Vincent Sheheen
- Succeeded by: Allen Blackmon

Personal details
- Born: May 20, 1970 (age 56) Columbia, South Carolina, U.S.
- Party: Republican
- Spouse: Todd Gustafson (m. 2007)
- Children: 3
- Education: Newberry College (BA); University of South Carolina

Penry Gustafson (born May 20, 1970) is a former member of the South Carolina Senate. She represented District 27 (Chesterfield, Kershaw, and Lancaster Counties) from 2021 to 2024.

== Political career ==
=== S.C. Senate ===
Gustafson served on the Senate Agriculture and Natural Resources, Corrections and Penology, Family and Veterans' Services, and Judiciary Committees.

==== Tenure ====
In early May 2023, Gustafson joined with a Democrat, an Independent and two other Republican women state senators, calling themselves, "The Sister Senators": Sen. Mia McLeod, Sen. Katrina Shealy (R-Lexington), Sen. Penry Gustafson (R-Kershaw), Sen. Margie Bright-Matthews (D-Colleton), and Sen. Sandy Senn (R-Charleston). They blocked a state senate bill that would ban all abortions in South Carolina. On May 23, 2023, Senate Republicans passed another bill that forbade abortion after six weeks.

In September 2023 it was announced that "The Sister Senators" had been selected to receive the John F. Kennedy Profiles in Courage Award. The award was presented in an October 2023 ceremony at the John F. Kennedy Presidential Library.

==== Endorsements ====
In June 2023, Gustafson endorsed Tim Scott in the 2024 United States presidential election.

=== Elections ===
==== 2020 election ====
In 2020, though taking only one of three counties, Gustafson defeated popular Senate incumbent and two-time gubernatorial candidate, Democrat Vincent Sheheen. She won with just 51% of the vote.

==== 2024 election ====
In 2024, Gustafson faced Republican primary challenger Allen Blackmon, a Lancaster County councilman. The primary challenge was prompted, in part, by Gustafson's opposition to the state's abortion ban. Blackmon won the Republican nomination, and went on to defeat Democratic challenger Yokima Cureton in the November general election.

Gustafson's defeat occurred alongside the defeats of Republican Senators Katrina Shealy and Sandy Senn, who also opposed to the abortion ban.

== Media portrayals ==
A documentary entitled “Sister Senators,” a Lynnwood Pictures and Global Neighborhood project, is now in production. Producers are Emily Harrold and Robin Hessman, co-producer is Rachel Denny. The film is executive produced by Ruth Ann Harnisch and co-executive produced by Ann Lovell. It has been presented at Ji.hlava International Documentary Film Festival.

South Carolina Senate
| Preceded by Vincent Sheheen | Member of the South Carolina Senate from the 27th district 2021–present | Incumbent |
