= Carlisle Kennedy =

American politician

Member of the South Carolina Senate from the 23rd district
- Incumbent
- Assumed office January 2025
- Preceded by: Katrina Shealy

Personal details
- Party: Republican
- Parent: Ralph Shealy Kennedy Jr.
- Education: Clemson University (BS, MBA); University of South Carolina (JD)
- Profession: Attorney

Carlisle Kennedy is an American politician, and a member of the South Carolina State Senate.

== Early life, education and career ==
Kennedy attended Batesburg-Leesville High School and graduated from Clemson University with a bachelor's in corporate finance and a master's in business administration. He graduated from the University of South Carolina School of Law in 2019, later working as an assistant solicitor in the 11th Judicial Circuit and with his father at Kennedy Law Firm in Batesburg-Leesville.

== Political career ==
=== S.C. Senate ===
==== 2024 election ====
In 2024, Kennedy and another opponent, Zoe Warren, challenged incumbent Katrina Shealy in the Republican primary. Shealy faced Kennedy in a runoff. On June 25, Shealy lost the election and conceded. Kennedy ran unopposed and won in the general election.

Kennedy was sworn in on December 4, 2024. He serves on the Senate Banking and Insurance, Fish, Game and Forestry; Judiciary, Labor, Commerce and Industry; and Rules committees.

== Personal life ==
Kennedy is the son of former South Carolina legislator Ralph Shealy Kennedy Jr.

South Carolina Senate
Preceded by Katrina Shealy	Member of the South Carolina Senate from the 23rd district 2024–present	Incumbent
