= Jeffrey R. Graham =

American politician

Member of the South Carolina Senate from the 35th district
- Incumbent
- Assumed office 2025
- Preceded by: Thomas McElveen

Personal details
- Party: Democratic
- Education: Presbyterian College
- Occupation: Realtor

Jeffrey Graham is a Member of the South Carolina Senate, representing the 35th district. He is a member of the Democratic Party.

== Political career ==
Graham has served on Camden (SC) City Council, and as Mayor of Camden.

On March 13, 2024, Graham announced his run for state senate, following the announcement that Democratic incumbent Thomas McElveen would not run for re-election.

After winning the Democratic primary, Graham faced Republican nominee Mike Jones.

On November 5, 2024, Graham defeated Jones to replace McElveen in the State Senate.
