= Ralph Shealy Kennedy Jr. =

American politician

Member of the South Carolina House of Representatives from the 39th district
- In office 2010–2017
- Succeeded by: Cal Forrest

Personal details
- Born: October 21, 1958 (age 67) Columbia, South Carolina, United States
- Party: Republican
- Children: Carlisle Kennedy

Ralph Shealy Kennedy Jr. (born October 21, 1958) is an American politician. He is a former member of the South Carolina House of Representatives from the 39th District, serving from 2010 until 2017. He is a member of the Republican party.
