= Ed Sutton (South Carolina politician) =

American politician

Member of the South Carolina Senate from the 20th district
- Incumbent
- Assumed office January 8, 2025
- Preceded by: Dick Harpootlian

Personal details
- Party: Democratic

Ed Sutton is an American businessman and politician serving as a member representing the South Carolina Senate from the 20th district.

On November 18, 2023, Sutton announced his run for the newly redistricted State Senate seat. He faced Libertarian nominee Kendal Ludden.

On November 5, 2024, Sutton won the election by close to 20,000 votes.

Sutton was previously a candidate for South Carolina House District 114, but lost to Republican Lin Bennett.

South Carolina Senate
Preceded by Dick Harpootlian	Member-elect of the South Carolina Senate from the 20th district	Incumbent
