= Katrina Shealy =

American politician (born 1954)

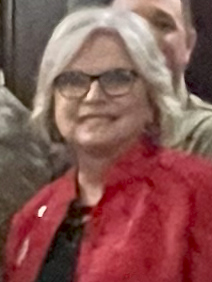
- Shealy in 2023

Member of the South Carolina Senate from the 23rd district
- In office January 2013 – January 2025
- Preceded by: Jake Knotts
- Succeeded by: Carlisle Kennedy

Personal details
- Born: December 25, 1954 (age 71) Columbia, South Carolina, U.S.
- Party: Republican
- Spouse: James Shealy
- Children: 3
- Website: Official website

Katrina Frye Shealy (born December 25, 1954) is an American politician, and a former member of the South Carolina State Senate. She is a Republican but was elected as a petition candidate from District 23 in Lexington County. At the time of her election in 2012, she was the only woman in the South Carolina Senate and in May of 2023, was one of six women serving in the South Carolina State Senate. She was defeated in a primary runoff in 2024.

She is an insurance executive and a former chairwoman of the Lexington County Republican Party. Shealy has been a past Chair of the S.C. Friends of Juvenile Justice and is active in Juvenile Justice reform.

== Political career ==
=== South Carolina state senate ===
==== Electoral history ====
===== 2008 election =====
In 2008, Shealy ran for the Republican Party's State Senate District 23 nomination against long-time incumbent state senator Jake Knotts. Despite support from prominent Republicans including United States Senator Jim DeMint, Shealy was defeated.

===== 2012 election =====
Shealy filed again as a candidate in the 2012 Republican primary. Her name was removed from the ballot after it was determined that she incorrectly filed her candidate paperwork. This case went to the SC Supreme Court and resulted in the removal of over 200 candidates from the ballot that year who had also incorrectly filed their paperwork. Cindi Ross Scoppe, writing in South Carolina newspaper The State, described this process as the "great ballot debacle of 2012". Shealy fought to have her name added to the general election ballot as a petition candidate and won the November 7, 2012 general election with 51% of the vote.

===== 2016 election =====
In 2016, she defeated her two Republican primary challengers, Michael Sturkie and Patricia Wheat, attaining more than 60% of the vote. In the general election, she was unopposed and elected to a second term in the state Senate.

===== 2020 election =====
Running against Democrat Bill Brown, Shealy was reelected to serve a third term on November 3, 2020, with 72.5% of the vote.

===== 2024 election =====
In 2024, Shealy saw two Republican primary challengers, Carlisle Kennedy and Zoe Warren. Shealy faced Carlisle Kennedy in a runoff. On June 25, Shealy was defeated by Kennedy, and conceded the race.

==== Tenure ====
Shealy chaired the Senate Family and Veterans' Services Committee, and served on the Senate Corrections and Penology, Finance, and Rules Committees.

In her first term, Shealy served on the Agricultural and Natural Resources Committee, Corrections and Penology Committee, Fish, Game and Forestry Committee, General Committee, and the Judiciary Committee. In 2015, Shealy was elected First Vice Chairman of the South Carolina Republican Party.

In her last term in office, she served on the following committees:

- Finance Committee,
- Labor, Commerce and Industry,
- Rules,
- Family and Veteran Services (Chairwoman) and
- Corrections and Penology

Shealy was appointed to serve on the SC Joint Citizens and Legislative Committee On Children and also served as past chair of the Southeastern Legislative Committee Human Services and Public Safety Committee. She served as Chair of the S.C. Suicide Prevention Committee and was a member of the S.C. Child Fatality Review Committee. As the Chairwoman of the Family and Veteran Services Committee, Shealy was the first Republican woman to serve as chair of a Standing Committee in the South Carolina Senate. Shealy was also co-chair of the SC Suicide Prevention Coalition and a member of the Governor's Committee on Domestic Violence. She also served on the Senate Operations and Management Committee. Senator Shealy served on the Board for the National Foundation of Women Legislators and served as National Chair in 2022.

In 2018, Shealy sponsored SB05, which created the Office of the Child Advocate (S805). This Agency has oversight over the nine state agencies that handle children's issues and went into effect on July 1, 2019.

===== Reproductive rights =====
In 2022, Shealy received national attention for a speech criticizing her colleagues' approach to abortion legislation. In 2023, she joined with a Democrat, an Independent and two other Republican women state senators, calling themselves, "The Sister Senators": Sen. Mia McLeod (I-Richland), Sen. Katrina Shealy (R-Lexington), Sen. Penry Gustafson (R-Kershaw), Sen. Margie Bright-Matthews (D-Colleton), and Sen. Sandy Senn (R-Charleston). They filibustered a bill that would have banned abortion after conception, with exemptions for cases of rape and incest available only in the first trimester.

On May 23, 2023, Senate Republicans passed another bill that prohibited abortions after six weeks, with exceptions made only in cases of rape, incest, fetal abnormalities or the woman's life or health being in danger. This bill paved the way for a Supreme Court confrontation over its elements. Shealy had offered an alternative amendment that would have preserved some rights, including a ban expanded to twelve weeks, but it was rejected by the Senate in a 21 to 25 vote. Shealy, Gustafson, and Senn were all defeated in their primary elections the following year.

=== Endorsements ===
In June 2023, Shealy endorsed Tim Scott in the 2024 United States presidential election. In July 2026, she endorsed Jermaine Johnson in the 2026 South Carolina gubernatorial election.

=== Katrina's Kids ===
In 2015 Shealy created a 501(c)3, Katrina's Kids, to serve children in Foster Care and Group Homes across all 46 counties in South Carolina. The foundation raises funds to send children to summer camp, participate in sporting opportunities, or any approved extracurricular activity not supported by state funding. The foundation has also helped with medical or dental funding for children. Katrina's Kids holds an Annual Music Benefit and a Race for the Case 5K event that helps supply suitcases and backpacks for children entering foster care.

== Personal life ==
Shealy is a Lutheran.

== Awards ==
Shealy has received the following awards:

- 2013 Outstanding Female Statesman Award for Lexington County Republican Party
- South Carolina Republican Party 2013 Terry Haskins Award
- South Carolina Federation of Republican Women's 2013 Woman of the Year
- Strom Thurmond Award for Excellence in Government in Public Service, 2013
- Saluda River Chapter of Trout Unlimited Conservationist of the Year, 2013
- 2014 South Carolina Wildlife Federation Conservationist of the Year
- 2014 South Carolina Taxpayers Association "Friend of the Taxpayer" Award
- 2014 Woodman of the World "Community Leadership"
- 2015 National Association of Social Workers (NASW) Legislator of the Year
- 2015 Palmetto Trout Award
- 2015 Palmetto Center for Women Twin Award
- 2015 SCCADVASA Legislator of the Year
- 2016 Children's Advocacy Champion for Children
- 2016 United Way Common Good Award for Volunteerism
- 2016 Trailblazer Award for Leadership on Domestic Violence Issues
- 2016 SCSHA Legislator of the Year Award
- 2016 FGA Champion for Children
- 2017 S.C. Beer Wholesalers Legislator of the Year
- 2017 American Legion Special Legislative Award
- 2017 Respectable Award, Able SC
- 2017 Legislative Award, S.C. Department of Probation, Pardon, and Parole Services
- 2019 Chair Elect National Foundation of Women Legislators
- 2018-2020 Chair Southeastern Legislative Conference Human Service and Public Safety Committee
- 2019 Board National Conference of State Legislatures Women's Network
- 2019 The Christian Life and Public Affairs Committee of the S.C. Baptist Convention Public Servant Award
- 2020 As One S.C. Outstanding Achievement Award
- 2020 S.C. Suicide Prevention Coalition Leadership & Service Appreciation Award
- 2021 S.C. National Guard Association State Senator of the Year
- 2021 Honorary Duckmaster - The Peabody Hotel
- 2021-2023 Chair, National Foundation for Women Legislators
- 2022 Able S.C. Legislative Award
- 2022 S.C. Department of Social Services Legislative Champion Award
- 2022 Girl Scouts Women of Distinction Award
- 2023 S.C. Network of Children's Advocacy Centers BeHeard4Kids State Leadership Award
- 2023 Wholespire Senate Legislative Champion
- 2023 Disability Advocacy Day, Advocate of the Year
- 2023 S.C. Athletic Trainers' Association President's Award
- 2023 Friends of Athletic Trainers
- 2023 Forbes 50 over 50 Most Influential Women in America “Impact”
- In September 2023 it was announced that "The Sister Senators" had been selected to receive the John F. Kennedy Profiles in Courage Award. The award was presented in an October 2023 ceremony at the John F. Kennedy Presidential Library.
- One of South Carolina Women in Leadership's 2023 Leadership Legacy Honorees, along with the other "Sister Senators"

== Media portrayals ==
A documentary entitled “Sister Senators,” a Lynnwood Pictures and Global Neighborhood project, is now in production. Producers are Emily Harrold and Robin Hessman, co-producer is Rachel Denny. The film is executive produced by Ruth Ann Harnisch and co-executive produced by Ann Lovell. It has been presented at Ji.hlava International Documentary Film Festival.

South Carolina Senate
Preceded by Jake Knotts	Member of the South Carolina Senate from the 23rd district 2013–present	Incumbent
