= Margie Bright Matthews =

American politician (born 1963)

Margie Matthews
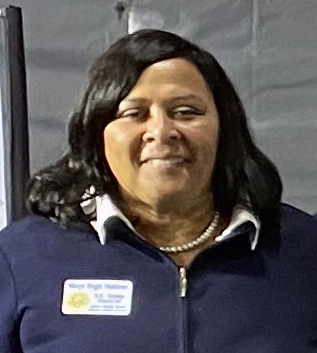
- Matthews in 2020

Member of the South Carolina Senate from the 45th district
- Incumbent
- Assumed office October 27, 2015
- Preceded by: Clementa Pinckney

Personal details
- Born: February 10, 1963 (age 63) Walterboro, South Carolina, U.S.
- Party: Democratic
- Spouse: Patrick Matthews (m. 1992)
- Children: 4
- Education: University of South Carolina (BS, JD)

Margie Bright Matthews (born February 10, 1963) is a Democratic member of the South Carolina Senate, representing the 45th District since 2015, when she won a special election to succeed Clementa Pinckney, who was killed in the Charleston church shooting in 2015. She is an attorney who founded a law firm.

== Early life and career ==
Margie Bright Matthews was born on February 10, 1963 in Walterboro, South Carolina. She graduated from University of South Carolina with a B.S. in 1985, and graduated with her J.D. from University of South Carolina School of Law in 1989.

Prior to her tenure in the state Senate, Matthews served as a page in the Senate and as a law clerk that helped draft legislation.

== State Senate ==
=== Elections ===
Matthews ran unopposed in the 2016 general election. In 2024, she ran unopposed again, and won her third full term in office.

==== 2015 Special Election ====
After Senator Clementa C. Pinckney was murdered in the Charleston church shooting, a special election was held in 2015. The primary, held on September 1st, featured eleven Democrats and two Republicans. Matthews raised almost $80,000 and was endorsed by Johnette and John Pinckney, sister and father of Clementa Pinckney. In the Democratic primary, Matthews received the most votes with 37%, leading to a runoff with Representative Kenneth Hodges who earned 35% of the vote. In the runoff on September 15, Matthews defeated Hodges by 12.4%. On October 20th, Matthews defeated Republican Al Fernandez when she received 89% of the vote. She was sworn into office on October 27, 2015.

==== 2020 election ====
Matthews was the uncontested Democratic nominee for her district in 2020. She defeated her Republican challenger, Rodney Buncum, when she received 60% of the vote.

=== Endorsements ===
Bright Matthews was among several African American women from around the United States who endorsed Hillary Rodham Clinton for President in 2016. Following Jim Clyburn's endorsement of Joe Biden, Matthews similarly endorsed Joe Biden in the 2020 Democratic Party presidential primaries the day before South Carolina's primary.

In the 2018 South Carolina gubernatorial election, Matthews endorsed James Smith, who would become the Democratic party's nominee. In 2022, Matthews endorsed fellow "Sister Senator" Mia McLeod in the 2022 South Carolina gubernatorial election.

Bright Matthews attended the 2024 Democratic National Convention as a First Congressional District Delegate.

=== Tenure ===
In 2024, Matthews was among the state legislators appointed to serve on the Robert Smalls Monument Commission.

In 2025, Matthews gave the Democratic response to Governor Henry McMaster's State of the State address.

In 2024, Matthews was one of two women in the South Carolina State Senate.

==== FOIA Reform ====
Senator Matthews was involved in reforming South Carolina's Freedom of Information Act (FOIA). During 2016 and 2017, Matthews consistently opposed key provisions of FOIA reform bills that aimed to transfer dispute resolution from local circuit courts to the state's Administrative Law Court. She argued that such changes would impose undue financial burdens on rural counties and increase costs for taxpayers. Matthews placed minority reports on several versions of the bill, effectively blocking their progress.

Despite significant support for the bill from other legislators and advocacy groups like the S.C. Press Association, Matthews maintained that establishing a new administrative office for FOIA disputes was unnecessary. Her opposition led to amendments that kept FOIA cases within the jurisdiction of circuit courts but imposed stricter deadlines for processing requests, aiming to balance transparency with fiscal responsibility. The final bill, which passed in 2017 and was signed into law by Governor Henry McMaster, included these compromises.

Recent investigations have assessed the impact of these FOIA reforms, revealing mixed results. While the law aimed to reduce fees and expedite access to public records, many agencies continue to charge high fees, particularly for copying and redaction. Examples include Chester County's $29,000 charge for email records and Horry County's $75,500 demand for lawsuit-related documents. Reports have shown that some agencies have not complied with the law's requirement to post fee schedules online, further complicating access to information. Critics argue that the allowance for redaction costs has effectively blocked access to public records, undermining the law's intent. Senator Matthews has defended the law, emphasizing the need to standardize costs and make them consistent across government entities.

==== Jasper Ocean Terminal ====
Matthews has pushed for the Jasper Ocean Terminal project, emphasizing its economic importance for Jasper County. Initially expected to be completed by 2025, the project faced delays, with the State Ports Authority (SPA) projecting completion by 2035-2037 due to current port capacities. Matthews expressed frustration at these delays, arguing for expedited development alongside other legislators. In 2021, the SPA agreed to transfer its interest in the terminal to Jasper County, contingent on legislative approval of $550 million in debt for improvements at the Port of Charleston. Matthews supported this bond bill, highlighting its potential to aid South Carolina's poorest counties and attract businesses to the region.

==== Reproductive Rights ====
Throughout her tenure, Senator Matthews has been a steadfast advocate for women's reproductive rights. She consistently opposed various personhood and abortion restriction bills, emphasizing constitutional concerns and the importance of women's autonomy. In 2016, she was the lone dissenting vote against a personhood bill that sought to grant legal rights to unborn children from conception, arguing it would lead to costly constitutional challenges shouldered by the state.

Matthews played a significant role in the 2018 filibuster against a bill that would have banned nearly all abortions in South Carolina, highlighting the lack of female representation in legislative discussions. She opposed the 2021 "fetal heartbeat" bill, which banned abortions as early as six weeks without exceptions for rape or incest, criticizing the requirement for victims to file police reports to qualify for exceptions.

In 2023, Matthews joined fellow female Senators, Mia McLeod (I-Richland), Katrina Shealy (R-Lexington), Penry Gustafson (R-Kershaw), and Sen. Sandy Senn (R-Charleston), to form a non-partisan coalition of women, dubbed "The Sister Senators," to oppose abortion restrictions in the state. They blocked the majority-male Senate from passing a bill that would ban all abortions in South Carolina. In September 2023, it was announced that "The Sister Senators" had been selected to receive the John F. Kennedy Profiles in Courage Award. The award was presented in an October 2023 ceremony at the John F. Kennedy Presidential Library.

In addition to opposing restrictive abortion laws, Matthews has advocated for better healthcare access to address high infant mortality rates in rural areas. She organized community events to provide resources and support for pregnant women, emphasizing the need for comprehensive healthcare solutions.

Throughout her career, Matthews has called for greater female representation in the legislature and advocated for public referendums to allow South Carolinians to decide on abortion rights. Her commitment to reproductive freedoms is reflected in her efforts to protect and advance women's rights in South Carolina.

== Controversies ==
=== Confederate Flag Procession in Colleton County ===
In June 2016, Matthews faced criticism for her reaction to a procession in Colleton County that displayed Confederate flags. The procession was intended to honor two local teenagers who had died in a car accident. Matthews initially condemned the display, mistakenly believing it was related to the Mother Emanuel Church shootings. She later apologized and clarified her misunderstanding.

=== Death of Raniya Wright ===
In 2019, Matthews became involved in the controversy surrounding the death of Raniya Wright, a fifth-grader from Forest Hills Elementary School in Walterboro, South Carolina. Following a classroom altercation, Raniya died, leading to conflicting accounts and public scrutiny.

Matthews stated, on the Senate floor, that Raniya did not receive any physical blows during the incident, contradicting claims by Raniya's mother, Ashley Wright, who alleged that her daughter had been bullied and that the school ignored her complaints. This statement was criticized by the Wright family's attorneys as premature and potentially downplaying the incident's severity.

The Colleton County Sheriff's Office and the Colleton County Coroner concluded that Raniya's death was due to a preexisting condition, arteriovenous malformation (AVM), and that the altercation did not cause her death. Despite these findings, Raniya's family continued to dispute the official reports, insisting that bullying and the school's inaction were factors.

Adding to the controversy, Matthews was identified as the attorney for the substitute teacher involved in the incident, although she publicly denied this role. The inconsistency in her statements further fueled public criticism.

=== Residency ===
During the 2015 special election, Matthews and her primary Democratic opponent, Ken Hodges, had their residency questioned. Both candidates acknowledged the properties they owned outside the district, but asserted that their primary residences were the homes they owned in-district.

== Media portrayals ==
A documentary entitled “Sister Senators,” a Lynnwood Pictures and Global Neighborhood project, is now in production. Producers are Emily Harrold and Robin Hessman, co-producer is Rachel Denny. The film is executive produced by Ruth Ann Harnisch and co-executive produced by Ann Lovell. It has been presented at Ji.hlava International Documentary Film Festival.
