= Sean Bennett (politician) =

American politician

Member of the South Carolina Senate from the 38th district
- Incumbent
- Assumed office January 2013
- Preceded by: Mike Rose

Personal details
- Born: May 13, 1968 (age 58) Charleston, South Carolina, U.S.
- Party: Republican
- Education: University of South Carolina (BA)

Sean M. Bennett (born May 13, 1968) is an American politician. He is a member of the Republican party.

== Political career ==
Bennett is a member of the South Carolina Senate from the 38th District, serving since 2012. He chairs the Senate Ethics Committee, and serves on the Senate Labor Commerce and Industry, and Transportation Committees.

In June 2023, Bennett endorsed Tim Scott in the 2024 United States presidential election.
