= Sandy Senn =

American politician (born 1963)

Member of the South Carolina Senate from the 41st district
- In office November 14, 2016 – November 11, 2024
- Preceded by: Paul Thurmond
- Succeeded by: Matt Leber

Personal details
- Born: June 27, 1963 (age 63) Orangeburg, South Carolina, US
- Party: Republican
- Spouse: Rande Lane
- Children: 3
- Education: University of South Carolina (JD)
- Website: Campaign website

Sandy Senn (born June 27, 1963) is a former member of the South Carolina Senate from the 41st district, serving from 2016 to 2024. She is a member of the Republican Party.

== Political career ==
=== Committees ===
Senn chairs the Charleston County Senate Legislative Delegation. She serves on the Senate Corrections and Penology; Judiciary; Labor, Commerce and Industry; Medical Affairs, and Transportation Committees.

Senn also serves on the following Joint Committees: the South Carolina Youth Smoking Prevention Advisory Commission and Palmetto Pride PRT.

=== 2016 Senate race ===
Senn won a runoff in the Republican primary to replace incumbent Paul Thurmond, who did not seek re-election. She won the general election with no Democratic opposition.

=== 2020 Senate race ===
Senn defeated Democratic nominee Sam Skardon in the general election.

=== 2024 Senate race ===
Senn lost the Republican primary to state representative Matt Leber.

== Positions ==
=== Education ===
In 2021, Senn drew criticism from conservatives due to her support for masking schoolchildren. Senn called for a special session to reconsider the state's ban on mask mandates in schools.

=== Elections, Health, Law Enforcement ===
In 2023 and 2024, Senn co-sponsored the following bills, all signed into law by Governor Henry McMaster: a bill to provide for the extension of an election protest filing deadline the State Health Facility Licensure Act; the South Carolina First Responder Line of Duty Death Benefit Fund; and a bill requiring tuberculosis testing in nursing homes.

=== Guns ===
In 2017, Senn voted against constitutional carry, and in 2021, she was the only Republican in either chamber to vote against the Open Carry with Training Act. In 2020, Senn received a 17% rating from the NRA Political Victory Fund, while in 2016, she was one of only a few Republican politicians in the entire United States to receive a 0% NRA rating.

=== Economy ===
In 2024, Senn was among legislators pushing for a study committee to review and provide remedies for insurance costs on small businesses.

=== Abortion ===
Senn supports the legalization of abortion. She has stated that the issue surrounding abortion access "[has] been about control" In 2023, she joined with a Democrat, an Independent, and two other Republican women state senators, calling themselves, "The Sister Senators": Sen. Mia McLeod (I-Richland), Sen. Katrina Shealy (R-Lexington), Sen. Penry Gustafson (R-Kershaw), Sen. Margie Bright-Matthews (D-Colleton) and Senn herself. They blocked the passage of a bill that would have banned almost all abortions in South Carolina; with exceptions for rape/incest (first-trimester only) and medical emergencies. Senn, Shealy, and Gustafson were all defeated in their primary elections the following year.

== Awards and recognitions ==
In September 2023, it was announced that Senn and the "Sister Senators" had been selected to receive the John F. Kennedy Profiles in Courage Award, joining prominent recipients such as George H.W. Bush, Barack Obama, Bob Inglis, Nancy Pelosi, John McCain and Gabrielle Giffords. The award was presented in an October 2023 ceremony at the John F. Kennedy Presidential Library.

== Media portrayals ==
In 2024, the documentary entitled Sister Senators, a Lynnwood Pictures and Global Neighborhood project, was announced to be in production. Producers are Emily Harrold and Robin Hessman, co-producer is Rachel Denny. The film is executive produced by Ruth Ann Harnisch and co-executive produced by Ann Lovell. It has been presented at Ji.hlava International Documentary Film Festival.
