= Brian Adams (politician) =

American politician (born 1969)

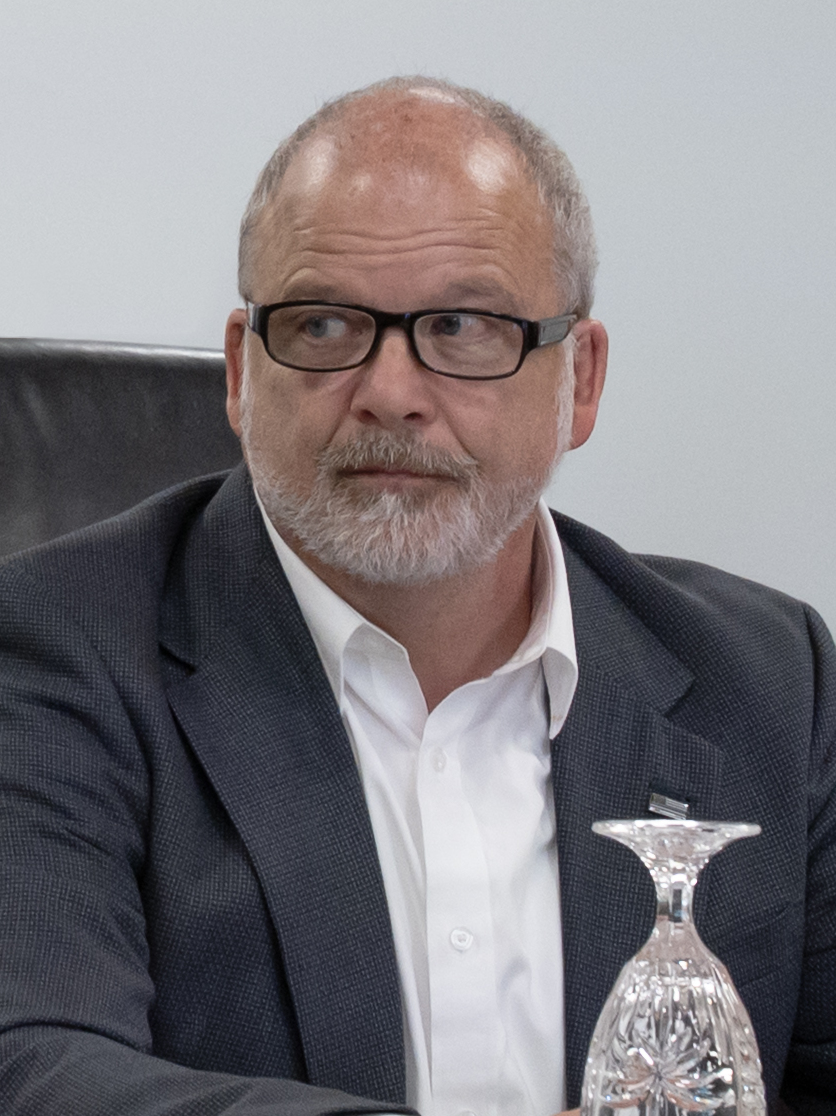
- Adams in 2025

Member of the South Carolina Senate from the 44th district
- Incumbent
- Assumed office November 9, 2020
- Preceded by: Paul G. Campbell Jr.

Personal details
- Born: Brian Adams; November 19, 1969 (age 56) Mount Clemens, Michigan, U.S.
- Party: Republican
- Spouse: Michelle Lynn Adams(m.1994)
- Children: 4 (Ryan Scott, Tyler Hunter, Lauren Nicole, and Dylan Nicholas)

Brian Adams (born December 27, 1969, in Mount Clemens, Michigan) is a member of the South Carolina Senate. He represents District 44(Berkeley and Charleston Counties).

Adams serves on the following Senate committees:

- Corrections and Penology
- Family and Veterans' Services
- Fish, Game and Forestry
- Judiciary
- Transportation

Adams is a supporter of term limits.

In June 2023, Adams endorsed Tim Scott in the 2024 United States presidential election. After Scott dropped out of the race, Adams endorsed Florida Governor Ron DeSantis.
