= Larry Grooms =

American politician in the South Carolina Senate

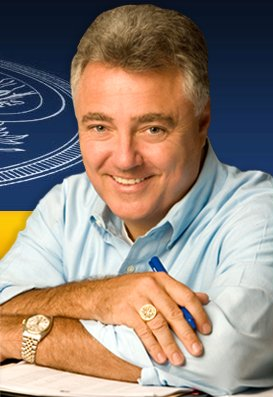

Member of the South Carolina Senate from the 37th district
- Incumbent
- Assumed office November 4, 1997
- Preceded by: DeWitt Williams

Personal details
- Born: March 20, 1964 (age 62) Moncks Corner, South Carolina, USA
- Party: Republican

Lawrence K. "Larry" Grooms (born March 20, 1964) is a Republican member of the South Carolina Senate, representing the 37th District. He has served as the Chairman of the Senate Transportation Committee since 2007.

== Early life ==
Grooms grew up in the small town of St. Stephen, South Carolina and received a degree from Clemson University.

== Career ==
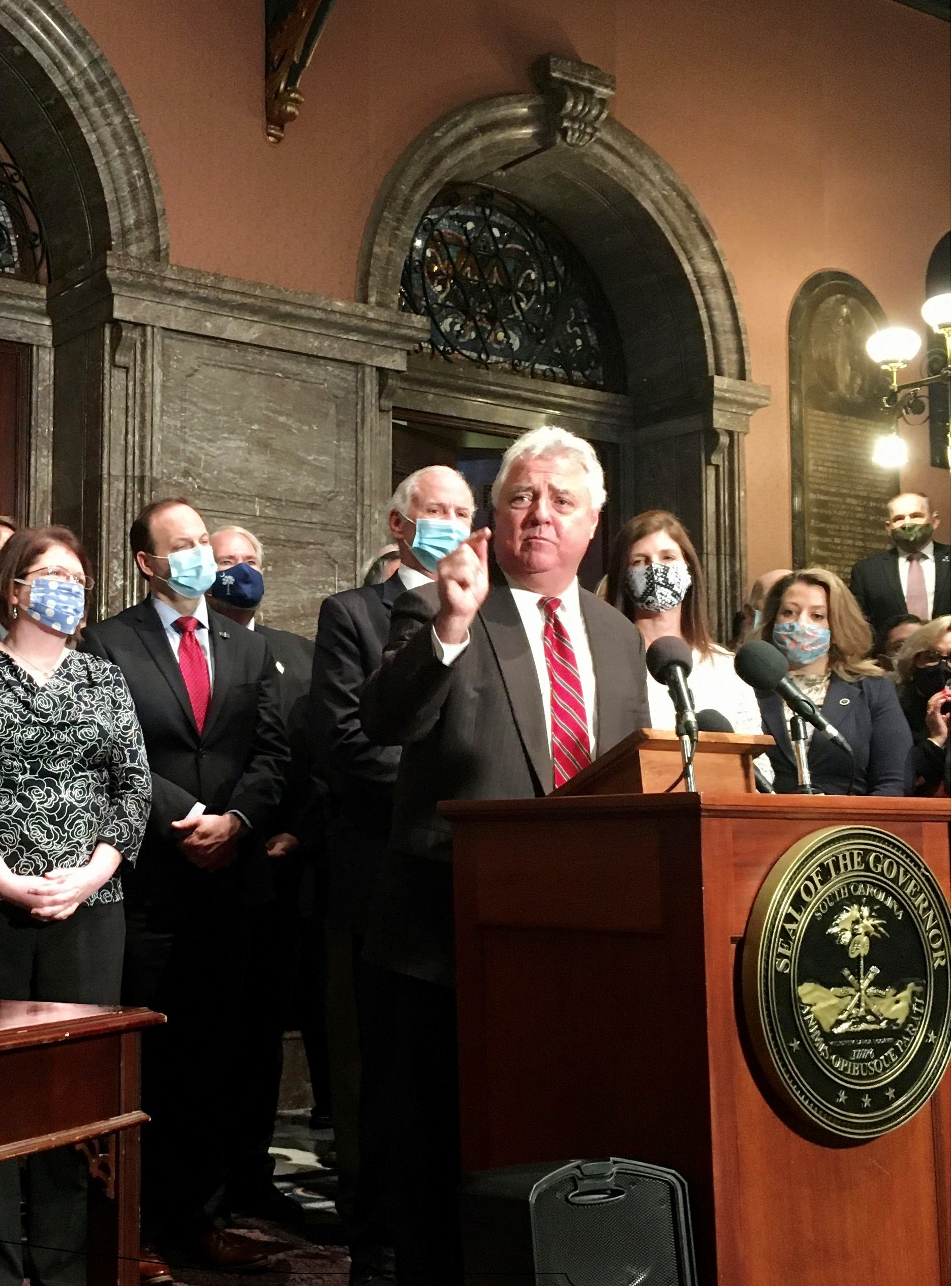
Senator Grooms speaks at the signing of S.1, "The Heartbeat Bill", for which he was the primary sponsor. He is joined by the Governor of South Carolina, Henry McMaster, and the Lieutenant Governor, Pamela Evette.

After college, Grooms started a convenience store, which he successfully expanded into a chain of gas stations throughout the South Carolina Lowcountry. His political career started when he was elected to the state senate in 1997 as a Republican. He has maintained a strongly conservative voting record throughout his tenure. In May 2009, Grooms announced his candidacy for Governor of South Carolina in the 2010 gubernatorial election but ended his campaign in January 2010. He founded the South Carolina Legislative Prayer Caucus in 2016 and has served as chairman since.

Grooms is firmly opposed to same-sex marriage. He is also staunchly anti-abortion and in December 2020 filed a heartbeat bill prohibiting abortions after six weeks gestational age. Planned Parenthood and other pro-choice organizations sued the State of South Carolina over the newly enacted law and preliminary injunction was issued the next day. In recognition of his efforts, Grooms was named Pro-Life Legislator of the Year by South Carolina Citizens for Life in both 2012 and in 2016.

Grooms is an advocate for school choice. In 2021, he voted in support of a bill to establish "Schools of Innovation", which receive students irrespective of where they live. He praised the bill for bringing "free market principles into the delivery of educational service." The REACH Act, which he penned, was signed into law in spring 2021, requiring public high schools and universities to instruct students on America's founding documents, including the Constitution, Declaration of Independence, and Federalist Papers.

In 2017, in an exchange with a constituent on Facebook, Grooms affirmed his support for Roy Moore's Alabama Senate campaign despite sexual abuse allegations against Moore. In a later interview, Grooms qualified his answer, saying, "If the allegations are proved to be true, it would be a different story."

In June 2023, Grooms endorsed Tim Scott in the 2024 United States presidential election.

== Personal life ==
Grooms, his wife Carol, and their three sons live in Bonneau, South Carolina. He is a life member of the National Association of Texaco and Shell Marketers and the National Rifle Association of America.
