= A. Shane Massey =

American politician (born 1975)

Shane Massey

Majority Leader of the South Carolina Senate
- Incumbent
- Assumed office April 6, 2016
- Preceded by: Harvey S. Peeler Jr.

Member of the South Carolina Senate from the 25th district
- Incumbent
- Assumed office November 6, 2007
- Preceded by: Tommy Moore

Personal details
- Born: Anthony Shane Massey; June 28, 1975 (age 51) Greeneville, Tennessee, U.S.
- Party: Republican
- Spouse: Blair Ballard (m. 2004)
- Education: Clemson University (BA); University of South Carolina, Columbia (JD)

Anthony Shane Massey (born June 28, 1975) is an American politician. Since 2007, he has represented the 25th District (Aiken, Edgefield, Lexington, McCormick, and Saluda Counties) in the South Carolina Senate. He is a member of the Republican party. Since 2016, Massey has been the Majority Leader of the South Carolina Senate.

== Early life and education ==
Massey was born on June 28, 1975 in Greeneville, Tennessee. He graduated with a bachelor's degree in 1997 from Clemson University. In 2000, he received his JD from the University of South Carolina.

== Political career ==
=== S.C. Senate ===
Massey is a Republican member of the South Carolina Senate, representing the 25th District since 2007. Massey became the Republican Majority Leader for the Senate on April 6, 2016. He currently chairs the Senate Rules committee. In 2024, Massey was among the state legislators appointed to serve on the Robert Smalls Monument Commission.

During the 2020 election, which took place during the COVID-19 pandemic, Massey voted to prevent ballot drop boxes from being used during the election in South Carolina.

In 2026, Massey, as the Senate Majority Leader, stated he would oppose any redistricting effort. He criticised "national Republicans for failing to deliver much with the majority they currently have," and warned that "if Republicans were to draw out Democrats entirely from the state's congressional delegation, South Carolina risks losing influence the next time a Democrat occupies the White House." He acknowledged he would likely face consequences for his position, and still voted against the measure.

=== U.S. House of Representatives ===
On March 20, 2009, Massey announced that he would be a Republican candidate for the US House of Representatives South Carolina's 3rd congressional district, but quickly declined, citing a desire to keep his family in South Carolina.

=== Endorsements ===
In June 2023, Massey endorsed Tim Scott in the 2024 United States presidential election.

== Personal life ==
Massey was named a 2014 Aspen Institute Rodel Fellow. He is a deacon and Sunday School teacher at the Providence Baptist Church.

== Electoral history ==
=== 2016 South Carolina Senate ===
2016 South Carolina Senate District 25 Republican primary
Party	Candidate	Votes	%
Republican	A. Shane Massey	5,597	58.9%
Republican	John Pettigrew	3,913	41.1%
Total votes		9,510	100.0%

2016 South Carolina Senate District 25 election
Party	Candidate	Votes	%
Republican	A. Shane Massey	34,890	99.0%
Write-in		356	1.0%
Total votes		35,246	100.0%

=== 2020 South Carolina Senate ===
2020 South Carolina Senate District 25 Republican primary
Party	Candidate	Votes	%
Republican	A. Shane Massey	10,340	78.8%
Republican	Susan J. Swanson	2,776	21.2%
Total votes		13,116	100.0%

2020 South Carolina Senate District 25 election
Party	Candidate	Votes	%
Republican	A. Shane Massey	37,009	69.6%
Democratic	Shirley A. Green Fayson	16,153	30.4%
Write-in		49	0.09%
Total votes		53,211	100.0%

=== 2024 South Carolina Senate ===
2024 South Carolina Senate District 25 election
Party	Candidate	Votes	%
Republican	A. Shane Massey	43,300	99.0%
Write-in		441	1.0%
Total votes		43,741	100.0%

South Carolina Senate
Preceded by Harvey S. Peeler Jr.	Majority Leader of the South Carolina Senate; 2016–present	Incumbent
