= South Carolina Senate =

Upper house of the South Carolina General Assembly

Coordinates: 33.836081°N 81.1637245°W

South Carolina State Senate
- South Carolina General Assembly
- Seal of the South Carolina Senate

Type
- Type: Upper house
- Term limits: None

History
- New session started: January 9, 2025

Leadership
- President: Thomas Alexander (R) since December 6, 2021
- Majority Leader: Shane Massey (R) since April 6, 2016
- Minority Leader: Brad Hutto (D) since November 17, 2020

Structure
- Seats: 46
- Political groups: Majority: Republican (34); Minority: Democratic (12)
- Length of term: 4 years
- Authority: Article III, South Carolina Constitution
- Salary: $10,400/year + per diem

Elections
- Last election: November 5, 2024 (46 seats)
- Next election: November 7, 2028 (46 seats)
- Redistricting: Legislative Control

Meeting place
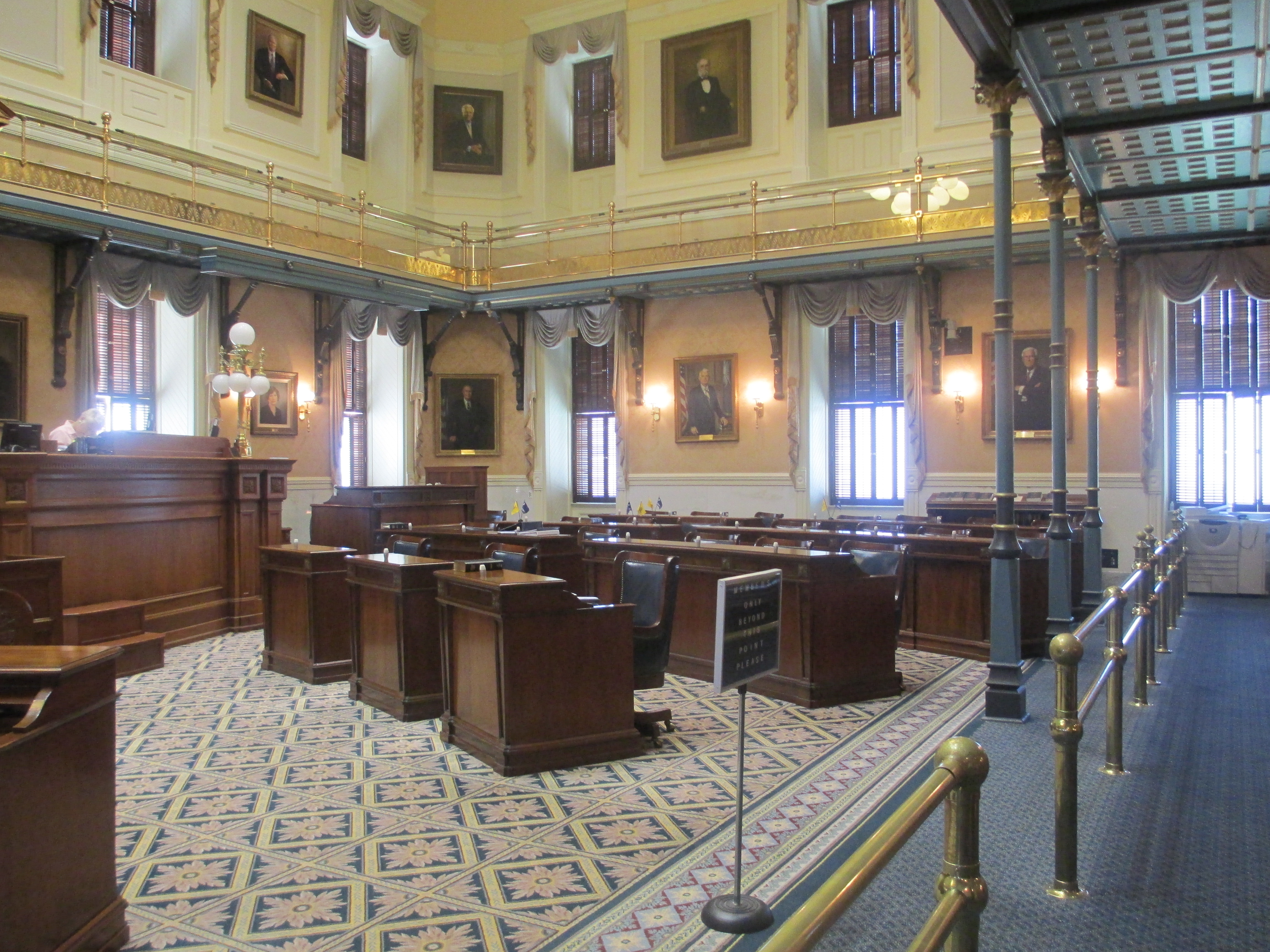
- State Senate Chamber; South Carolina State House; Columbia, South Carolina

Website
- South Carolina Senate

Rules
- Rules of the Senate of South Carolina

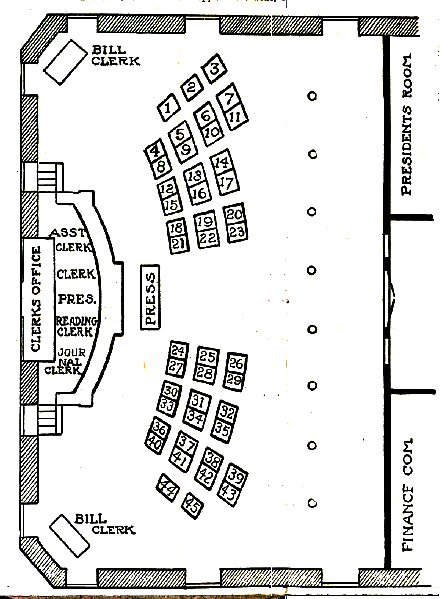
A diagram of the Senate Chamber, 1917

The South Carolina State Senate is the upper house of the South Carolina General Assembly, the state legislature of the U.S. state of South Carolina. The lower house is the South Carolina House of Representatives. The Senate comprises 46 senators elected from single-member districts for four-year terms, coinciding with United States presidential elections.

The South Carolina Constitution of 1895 initially stipulated that each county would elect one senator for a four-year term, with elections staggered biennially. Following the 1964 U.S. Supreme Court ruling in Reynolds v. Sims, the Senate underwent reapportionment. A temporary measure in 1966 established 27 districts with 50 members serving two-year terms. In 1967, the Senate was again reapportioned into 20 districts with 46 members, serving four-year terms. The number of districts was reduced to 16 in 1972, and by 1984, the state adopted a system of single-member districts.

The General Assembly convenes annually at the State Capitol Building in Columbia on the second Tuesday of January. Either the House or the Senate may, by a majority vote, declare a 30-day recess, or a longer recess with a two-thirds vote.

== Composition ==
Affiliation	Party (Shading indicates majority caucus)			Total	Vacant
Affiliation	Republican	Democratic	Independent	Total	Vacant
Start of 2023 Session	30	15	1	46	0
Start of 2025 Session	34	12	0	46	0
Latest voting share	73.9%	26.1%			

=== Members of the South Carolina Senate ===
Except as noted, all senators were elected in November 2024 and terms began on January 14, 2025. All terms expire in January of 2029.

District	Name	Party	Residence	Start
1	Thomas C. Alexander	Republican	Walhalla	1994 (Note: First elected in a special election.)
2	Rex Rice	Republican	Easley	2016
3	Richard Cash	Republican	Powdersville	2017
4	Michael Gambrell	Republican	Honea Path	2016
5	Tom Corbin	Republican	Travelers Rest	2012
6	Jason Elliott	Republican	Greenville	2024
7	Karl B. Allen	Democratic	Greenville	2012
8	Ross Turner	Republican	Greenville	2012
9	Danny Verdin	Republican	Laurens	2000
10	Billy Garrett	Republican	Greenwood	2020
11	Josh Kimbrell	Republican	Inman	2020
12	Lee Bright	Republican	Roebuck	2025
13	Shane Martin	Republican	Spartanburg	2008
14	Harvey S. Peeler Jr.	Republican	Gaffney	1980
15	James Burns (elect)	Republican	Rock Hill	2026
16	Michael Johnson	Republican	Tega Cay	2020
17	Everett Stubbs	Republican	Rock Hill	2024
18	Ronnie Cromer	Republican	Prosperity	2003
19	Tameika Isaac Devine	Democratic	Columbia	2024
20	Ed Sutton	Democratic	North Charleston	2024
21	Darrell Jackson	Democratic	Hopkins	1992
22	Overture Walker	Democratic	Columbia	2024
23	Carlisle Kennedy	Republican	Lexington	2024
24	Tom Young Jr.	Republican	Aiken	2012
25	A. Shane Massey	Republican	Edgefield	2007
26	Russell Ott	Democratic	Columbia	2024
27	Allen Blackmon	Republican	Heath Springs	2024
28	Greg Hembree	Republican	North Myrtle Beach	2012
29	JD Chaplin	Republican	Darlington	2024
30	Kent M. Williams	Democratic	Marion	2004
31	Mike Reichenbach	Republican	Florence	2022
32	Ronnie A. Sabb	Democratic	Greeleyville	2014
33	Luke A. Rankin	Republican	Conway	1992
34	Stephen Goldfinch	Republican	Murrells Inlet	2016
35	Jeffrey R. Graham	Democratic	Camden	2024
36	Jeff Zell	Republican	Sumter	2024
37	Larry Grooms	Republican	Bonneau	1997
38	Sean Bennett	Republican	Summerville	2012
39	Tom Fernandez	Republican	Summerville	2024
40	Brad Hutto	Democratic	Orangeburg	1996
41	Matt Leber	Republican	John's Island	2024
42	Deon Tedder	Democratic	Charleston	2023
43	Chip Campsen	Republican	Isle of Palms	2004
44	Brian Adams	Republican	Goose Creek	2020
45	Margie Bright Matthews	Democratic	Charleston	2015
46	Tom Davis	Republican	Beaufort	2008

== Composition of the Senate over time ==
Year	Democratic Party	Republican Party	Independent / Other	Majority
1865	0	0	31	31
1868	6 (Note: The election of a Democrat from Abbeville was declared void and the seat remained vacant.)	25	0	19
1870	5	26	1	21
1872	8	25	0	17
1874	0	26	7 (Note: All 7 were members of the Conservative Party of South Carolina.)	19
1876	15	18	0	3
1878	28	5	0	23
1880	33	2	0	31
1882	33	2	0	31
1884	32	3	0	29
1886	33	2	0	31
1888	35	0	0	35
1890	32	3	0	29
1892	36	0	0	36
1894	29	0	7 (Note: All 7 were Independent Democrats.)	22
1896	36	0	0	36
1898– 1908	41	0	0	41
1910– 1916	44	0	0	44
1918– 1964	46	0	0	46
1966	43	6	1	37
1968	47	3	0	44
1970	44	2	0	42
1972	43	3	0	40
1976	42	4	0	38
1980	39	7	0	32
1984	36	10	0	26
1988	35	11	0	24
1992	30	16	0	14
1996	25	21	0	4
2000	22 (Note: After the 2000 elections, the Senate was evenly split between 23 Democrats and 23 Republicans. A Democrat, J. Verne Smith of Greer, switched to the Republicans to break the tie.)	24	0	2
2004	20	26 (Note: Republicans gained an additional seat in a 2007 special election.)	0	6
2008	19	27	0	8
2012	18	28	0	10
2016	18	28	0	10
2020	15 (Note: One independent, Mia McLeod, was formerly a member of the Democratic Party until January 10, 2023.)	30	1	14
2024	12	34	0	22

== See also ==
- List of South Carolina state legislatures
