= 2004 South Carolina Senate election =

American state legislative election

- November 2, 2004

All 46 seats in the South Carolina Senate 24 seats needed for a majority
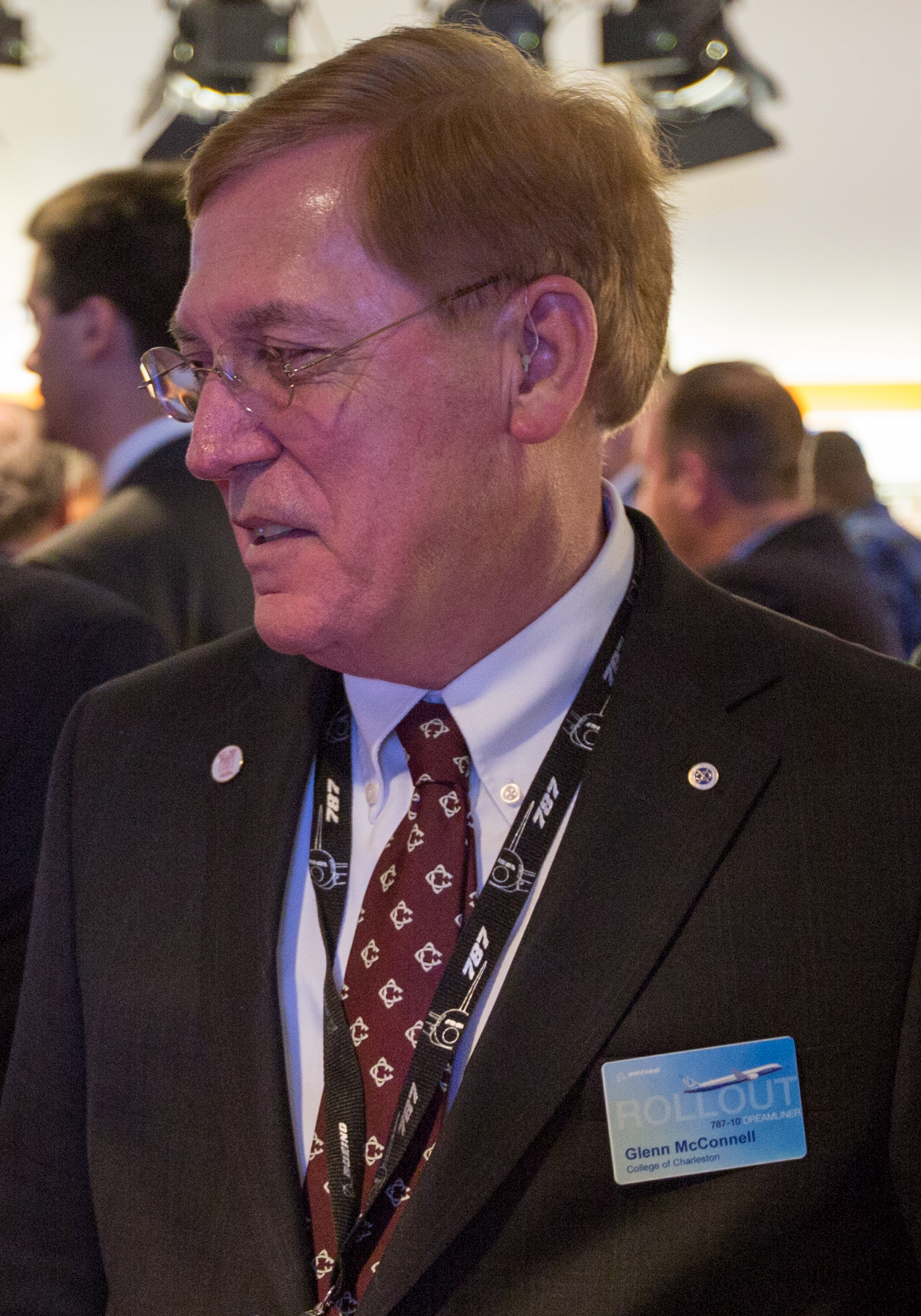

	Majority party	Minority party
Leader	Glenn F. McConnell	John C. Land III
Party	Republican	Democratic
Leader's seat	41st	36th
Seats before	25	21
Seats after	26	20
Seat change	▲1	▼1
President pro tempore before election
Glenn F. McConnell
Republican
Elected President pro tempore
Glenn F. McConnell
Republican

The 2004 South Carolina Senate election was held on Tuesday, November 2, 2004. The primary elections were held on June 8, and the runoff elections were held on June 22. With each Senator's four-year term expired, all forty-six seats were up for election.

Republicans retained their majority gained in the 2002 South Carolina Senate elections, marking the first prolonged period of Republican rule of the chamber since the Reconstruction Era, and the "maturity" of South Carolina's "long-predicated [political realignment]" away from Democratic control.

Experts noted this election for its predictability, with "very few seats seriously contested." Republicans contested just eight seats, while Democrats contested nine. This aligned with a surge in uncontested state legislative races across the country.

== Certified political parties ==
The following parties were certified by the South Carolina Election Commission, thus eligible to participate in and put up candidates for the state's Senate elections:

- Constitution Party: Chaired by Ted Adams.
- Democratic Party: Chaired by Joe Erwin.
- Green Party
- Independence Party (later merged with the Forward Party): Chaired by Wayne Griffin.
- Libertarian Party: Chaired by Chris Panos.
- Republican Party: Chaired by Katon Dawson
- United Citizens Party

== Special elections ==
=== District 18 (April 15, 2003) ===
On January 15, 2003, Rudolph Andreas Bauer resigned from the Senate to take up the office of Lieutenant Governor. A special election was called to replace him. Primary elections were held on February 25, 2003. The special election was held on April 15, 2003.

South Carolina Senate District 18 Special Election Democratic Primary
Party	Candidate	Votes	%
Democratic	Ronnie Abrams	241	9.9
Democratic	Jim Lander	2,174	90.1
Total votes		2,415	100.0

South Carolina Senate District 18 Special Election Republican Primary
Party	Candidate	Votes	%
Republican	Chad Connelly	1,661	26.4
Republican	Ronnie Cromer	4,617	73.6
Total votes		6,278	100.0

South Carolina Senate District 18 Special Election
Party	Candidate	Votes	%
Republican	Ronnie Cromer	6,929	62.6
Democratic	Jim Lander	3,855	34.9
Libertarian Party of South Carolina	Stephen Cain	271	2.45%
Total votes		11,056	100.0

=== District 27 (February 3, 2004) ===
A special election was called to replace Senator Donald Holland, who died on October 5, 2003. The Republican primary was held on December 16, 2003. The special election was held on February 3, 2004.

South Carolina Senate District 27 Special Election Republican Primary
Party	Candidate	Votes	%
Republican	Buddy Wilson	226	14.1
Republican	Steve Kelly	1,375	85.9
Total votes		1,601	100.0

South Carolina Senate District 27 Special Election
Party	Candidate	Votes	%
Democratic	Vincent Sheheen	7,942	62.2
Republican	Steve Kelly	4,841	37.8
Total votes		11,056	100.0

== Results by party ==
Party	Votes		Seats		
Party	No.	%	No.	+/−	%
South Carolina Republican Party	847,746	59.72	26	+1	56.52
South Carolina Democratic Party	548,899	38.67	20	-1	43.48
Independent	6,580	0.46	0	0	0.00
Write-in	6,575	0.46	0	0	0.00
Libertarian Party of South Carolina	6,219	0.44	0	0	0.00
United Citizens Party	3,573	0.25	0	0	0.00
Total	1,419,592	100.00	46	±0	100.00
Registered voters	2,315,462	100.00			
Turnout	1,419,592	61.31			
Source: South Carolina Election Commission					

Popular vote
Republican	59.72%
Democratic	38.67%
Other	1.61%

Senate seats
Republican	56.52%
Democratic	43.48%

== Summary ==
District	Incumbent	Party	Elected Senator	Party	Result
1st	Thomas C. Alexander	Rep	Thomas C. Alexander	Rep	Republican hold
2nd	Larry A. Martin	Rep	Larry A. Martin	Rep	Republican hold
3rd	Robert L. Waldrep Jr.	Rep	Kevin L. Bryant	Rep	Republican hold
4th	Billy O'Dell	Rep	Billy O'Dell	Rep	Republican hold
5th	Verne J. Smith	Rep	Vern J. Smith	Rep	Republican hold
6th	Mike Fair	Rep	Mike Fair	Rep	Republican hold
7th	Ralph Anderson	Dem	Ralph Anderson	Dem	Democratic hold
8th	David L. Thomas	Rep	David L. Thomas	Rep	Republican hold
9th	Danny Verdin	Rep	Danny Verdin	Rep	Republican hold
10th	John Drummond	Dem	John Drummond	Dem	Democratic hold
11th	Glenn G. Reese	Rep	Glenn G. Reese	Rep	Republican hold
12th	John D. Hawkins	Rep	John D. Hawkins	Rep	Republican hold
13th	James "Jim" Ritchie	Rep	James "Jim" Ritchie	Rep	Republican hold
14th	Harvey S. Peeler Jr.	Rep	Harvey S. Peeler Jr.	Rep	Republican hold
15th	Robert Hayes	Rep	Robert Hayes	Rep	Republican hold
16th	Chauncey "Greg" Gregory	Rep	Chauncey "Greg" Gregory	Rep	Republican hold
17th	Linda H. Short	Dem	Linda H. Short	Dem	Democratic hold
18th	Ronnie Cromer	Rep	Ronnie Cromer	Rep	Republican hold
19th	Kay Patterson	Dem	Kay Patterson	Dem	Democratic hold
20th	John Courson	Rep	John Courson	Rep	Republican hold
21st	Darrell Jackson	Dem	Darrell Jackson	Dem	Democratic hold
22nd	Warren K. Giese	Ind	Joel Lourie	Dem	Democratic GAIN
23rd	John Knotts	Rep	John Knotts	Rep	Republican hold
24th	Greg W. Ryberg	Rep	Greg W. Ryberg	Rep	Republican hold
25th	Thomas L. Moore	Dem	Thomas L. Moore	Dem	Democratic hold
26th	Nikki G. Setzler	Dem	Nikki G. Setzler	Dem	Democratic hold
27th	Vincent Sheheen	Dem	Vincent Sheheen	Dem	Republican hold
28th	Dick Elliott	Dem	Dick Elliott	Dem	Democratic hold
29th	Gerald Malloy	Dem	Gerald Malloy	Dem	Democratic hold
30th	Kent M. Williams	Dem	Kent M. Williams	Dem	Democratic hold
31st	Hugh Leatherman	Rep	Hugh Leatherman	Rep	Republican hold
32nd	John Yancy McGill	Dem	John Yancy McGill	Dem	Democratic hold
33rd	Luke A. Rankin	Rep	Luke A. Rankin	Rep	Republican hold
34th	Arthur Ravenel Jr.	Rep	Raymond Cleary	Rep	Republican hold
35th	Phil P. Leventis	Dem	Phil P. Leventis	Dem	Democratic hold
36th	John C. Land, III	Dem	John C. Land, III	Rep	Democratic hold
37th	Larry Grooms	Rep	Larry Grooms	Rep	Republican hold
38th	William S. Branton	Rep	Russell Scott	Rep	Republican hold
39th	John Matthews Jr.	Dem	John Matthews Jr.	Dem	Democratic hold
40th	Brad Hutto	Dem	Brad Hutto	Dem	Democratic hold
41st	Glenn McConnell	Rep	Glenn McConnell	Rep	Republican hold
42nd	Robert Ford	Dem	Robert Ford	Dem	Democratic hold
43rd	John Kuhn	Rep	George "Chip" Campsen	Rep	Republican hold
44th	Bill Mescher	Rep	Bill Mescher	Rep	Republican hold
45th	Clementa C. Pinckney	Dem	Clementa C. Pinckney	Dem	Democratic hold
46th	Scott Richardson	Rep	Scott Richardson	Rep	Republican hold

== Detailed results ==
=== District 1 ===
District one comprised all of Oconee County and some of Pickens County.

South Carolina Senate District 1 General Election, 2004
Party	Candidate	Votes	%
Republican	Thomas C. Alexander	24,848	100
Total votes		24,848	100.0

=== District 2 ===
District two contained a partial section of Pickens County.

South Carolina Senate District 2 General Election, 2004
Party	Candidate	Votes	%
Republican	Larry A. Martin	29,402	100
Total votes		29,402	100.0

=== District 3 ===
District three contained some of Anderson County. Incumbent Republican Senator Robert L. Waldrep Jr. did not seek re-election, so primaries were held to nominate a replacement candidate. Kevin L. Bryant won the nomination and defeated Democratic challenger Mike Mullinax and won the seat.

South Carolina Senate District 3 Democratic Primary, 2004
Party	Candidate	Votes	%
Democratic	Eli Allgood	639	39.4
Democratic	Mike Mullinax	981	60.6
Total votes		1,620	100.0

South Carolina Senate District 3 Republican Primary, 2004
Party	Candidate	Votes	%
Republican	Ron Wilson	3,324	25.8
Republican	Kevin L. Bryant	4,678	36.3
Republican	Chuck Allen	4,868	37.8
Total votes		12,870	100.0

South Carolina Senate District 3 Republican Primary Runoff, 2004
Party	Candidate	Votes	%
Republican	Chuck Allen	4,806	37.2
Republican	Kevin L. Bryant	8,118	62.8
Total votes		12,924	100.0

South Carolina Senate District 3 General Election, 2004
Party	Candidate	Votes	%
Democratic	Mike Mullinax	14,356	34.9
Republican	Kevin L. Bryan	24,999	65.1
Total votes		38,355	100.0

=== District 4 ===
District four contained portions of Abbeville County and Anderson County.

South Carolina Senate District 4 General Election, 2004
Party	Candidate	Votes	%
Democratic	Jay West	10,546	37.7
Republican	Billy O'Dell	17,417	62.3
Total votes		27,963	100.0

=== District 5 ===
District five held a portion of Greenville County.

South Carolina Senate District 5 General Election, 2004
Party	Candidate	Votes	%
Libertarian Party of South Carolina	D. Russell Seegard	3,618	10.1
Republican	J. Verne Smith	32,386	89.9
Total votes		36,004	100.0

=== District 6 ===
District six contained a portion of Greenville County.

South Carolina Senate District 6 General Election, 2004
Party	Candidate	Votes	%
Republican	Mike Fair	27,788	100
Total votes		27,788	100.0

=== District 7 ===
District seven contained a portion of Greenville County.

South Carolina Senate District 7 Democratic Primary, 2004
Party	Candidate	Votes	%
Democratic	Debra J. Gammons	861	18.58
Democratic	Ralph Anderson	3,772	81.42
Total votes		4,633	100.0

South Carolina Senate District 7 General Election, 2004
Party	Candidate	Votes	%
Democratic	Ralph Anderson	20,487	100.00
Total votes		20,487	100.0

=== District 8 ===
District eight contained a portion of Greenville County.

South Carolina Senate District 8 General Election, 2004
Party	Candidate	Votes	%
Republican	David Thomas	36,892	65.1
Total votes		36,892	100.0

=== District 9 ===
District nine contained portions of Greenville County and Laurens County.

South Carolina Senate District 9 General Election, 2004
Party	Candidate	Votes	%
Democratic	James E. Bryan, Jr.	12,888	39.91
Republican	Danny Verdin	19,402	60.09
Total votes		32,290	100.00

=== District 10 ===
District ten contained all of Greenwood County and some of Abbeville County.

South Carolina Senate District 10 Democratic Primary, 2004
Party	Candidate	Votes	%
Democratic	David Henderson	1,920	30.60
Democratic	John Drummond	4,354	69.40
Total votes		6,274	100.0

South Carolina Senate District 10 General Election, 2004
Party	Candidate	Votes	%
Republican	Dale C. Phillips	9,446	33.80
Democratic	John Drummond	18,502	66.20
Total votes		27,948	100.00

=== District 11 ===
District eleven contained a portion of Spartanburg County.

South Carolina Senate District 11 General Election, 2004
Party	Candidate	Votes	%
Republican	Steve Parker	13,527	44.37
Democratic	Glenn Reese	16,962	55.63
Total votes		30,489	100.00

=== District 12 ===
District twelve contained a portion of Spartanburg County.

South Carolina Senate District 12 Republican Primary, 2004
Party	Candidate	Votes	%
Republican	Lee Bright	4,731	49.84
Republican	John David Hawkins	4,762	50.16
Total votes		9,493	100.0

South Carolina Senate District 12 General Election, 2004
Party	Candidate	Votes	%
Democratic	Leonardo Ortiz	10,196	29.50
Republican	John D. Hawkins	24,365	70.50
Total votes		34,561	100.00

=== District 13 ===
District thirteen contained a portion of Spartanburg County.

South Carolina Senate District 13 General Election, 2004
Party	Candidate	Votes	%
Republican	Jim Ritchie	25,275	100.00
Total votes		25,275	100.00

=== District 14 ===
District fourteen contained portions of Cherokee, Union, and York counties.

South Carolina Senate District 14 General Election, 2004
Party	Candidate	Votes	%
Democratic	Rick Dizbon	10,079	30.51
Republican	Harvey Peeler	22,957	69.49
Total votes		33,036	100.00

=== District 15 ===
District fifteen contained a portion of York county.

South Carolina Senate District 15 General Election, 2004
Party	Candidate	Votes	%
Republican	Wes Hayes	30,520	100.00
Total votes		30,520	100.00

=== District 16 ===
District sixteen contained portions of Fairfield, Lancaster, and York counties.

South Carolina Senate District 16 General Election, 2004
Party	Candidate	Votes	%
Democratic	Donn J. Sinclair	11,344	34.78
Republican	Greg Gregory	21,273	65.22
Total votes		32,617	100.00

=== District 17 ===
District seventeen contained portions of Chester, Fairfield, Union, and York counties.

South Carolina Senate District 17 Democratic Primary, 2004
Party	Candidate	Votes	%
Democratic	Willie J. Graham, II	2,970	26.61
Democratic	Linda H. Short	8,190	73.39
Total votes		11,160	100.0

South Carolina Senate District 17 General Election, 2004
Party	Candidate	Votes	%
Democratic	Linda H. Short	25,527	100.00
Total votes		25,527	100.00

=== District 18 ===
District eighteen contained all of Newberry and Saluda counties, with portions of Lexington and Union counties.

South Carolina Senate District 18 General Election, 2004
Party	Candidate	Votes	%
Republican	Ronnie W. Cromer	30,022	100.00
Total votes		30,022	100.00

=== District 19 ===
District nineteen contained a portion of Richland County.

South Carolina Senate District 19 Democratic Primary, 2004
Party	Candidate	Votes	%
Democratic	Hemphill P. Pride, II	844	15.08
Democratic	Kay Patterson	4,751	84.92
Total votes		5,595	100.0

South Carolina Senate District 19 General Election, 2004
Party	Candidate	Votes	%
United Citizens	Chris Nelums	3,573	11.62
Democratic	Kay Patterson	27,171	88.38
Total votes		30,744	100.00

=== District 20 ===
District twenty contained a portion of Richland County.

South Carolina Senate District 20 General Election, 2004
Party	Candidate	Votes	%
Republican	John Courson	31,495	100.00
Total votes		31,495	100.00

=== District 21 ===
District twenty-one contained portions of Calhoun and Richland counties.

South Carolina Senate District 21 Democratic Primary, 2004
Party	Candidate	Votes	%
Democratic	Edward D. Sullivan	774	12.55
Democratic	Darrell Jackson	5,393	87.45
Total votes		6,167	100.0

South Carolina Senate District 21 General Election, 2004
Party	Candidate	Votes	%
Democratic	Darrell Jackson	26,041	100.00
Total votes		26,041	100.00

=== District 22 ===
District twenty-two contained portions of Kershaw and Richland counties. Incumbent Senator Warren Giese, a former Independent, ran in the Republican primary, but lost to Ken Wingate. The seat was won by Democrat Joel Lourie, representing one of the few legislative gains made by Democrats in the election.

South Carolina Senate District 22 Republican Primary, 2004
Party	Candidate	Votes	%
Republican	Warren B. Giese	4,145	42.27
Republican	Ken Wingate	5,661	57.73
Total votes		9,806	100.0

South Carolina Senate District 22 General Election, 2004
Party	Candidate	Votes	%
Republican	Ken Wingate	19,340	44
Democratic	Joel Lourie	24,616	56
Total votes		43,956	100.00

=== District 23 ===
District twenty-three contained portions of Lexington County.

South Carolina Senate District 23 Republican Primary, 2004
Party	Candidate	Votes	%
Republican	Shirley M. Sons	3,652	36.60
Republican	Jake Knotts	6,326	63.40
Total votes		9,978	100.0

South Carolina Senate District 23 General Election, 2004
Party	Candidate	Votes	%
Republican	Jake Knotts	28,572	100.00
Total votes		28,572	100.00

=== District 24 ===
District twenty-four contained portions of Aiken and Lexington counties.

South Carolina Senate District 24 General Election, 2004
Party	Candidate	Votes	%
Republican	Greg Ryberg	30,428	100.00
Total votes		30,428	100.00

=== District 25 ===
District twenty-five contained all of Edgefield and McCormick counties and some of Aiken County.

South Carolina Senate District 25 General Election, 2004
Party	Candidate	Votes	%
Republican	Bernie Hamby	10,628	32.15
Democratic	Thomas L. Moore	22,433	67.85
Total votes		33,061	100.00

=== District 26 ===
District twenty-six contained portions of Aiken and Lexington counties.

South Carolina Senate District 26 General Election, 2004
Party	Candidate	Votes	%
Libertarian Party of South Carolina	Burt Barber	2,601	10.98
Democratic	Nikki Setzler	21,090	89.02
Total votes		23,691	100.00

=== District 27 ===
District twenty-seven contained all of Chesterfield County, with portions of Kershaw, Lancaster, and Marlborocounties.

South Carolina Senate District 27 General Election, 2004
Party	Candidate	Votes	%
Republican	Steve Kelly	13,418	43.55
Democratic	Vincent Sheheen	17,395	56.45
Total votes		30,813	100.00

=== District 28 ===
District twenty-eight comprised portions of Dillon, Florence, Horry, Marion, Marlboro, and Williamsburg counties. Democratic incumbent Dick Elliott narrowly defeated Republican challenger Katherine Jenerette. While she conceded the election, Jenerette alleged the election had "numerous 'irregularities'" and filed a report with the United States Department of Justice to investigate.

South Carolina Senate District 28 General Election, 2004
Party	Candidate	Votes	%
Republican	Katherine Jenerette	14,324	46.92
Democratic	Dick Elliott	16,204	53.08
Total votes		30,528	100.00

=== District 29 ===
District twenty-nine comprised portions of Darlington, Florence, and Lee counties.

South Carolina Senate District 29 Republican Primary Election, 2004
Party	Candidate	Votes	%
Republican	Michael S. Holt	2,750	49.33
Republican	Warren Arthur	2,825	50.67
Total votes		5,575	100.00

South Carolina Senate District 29 General Election, 2004
Party	Candidate	Votes	%
Republican	Warren Arthur	12,750	42
Democratic	Gerald Malloy	17,608	58
Total votes		30,358	100.00

=== District 30 ===
District thirty comprised portions of Dillion, Florence, and Marion counties. Incumbent Democratic Senator Maggie Wallace Glover sought re-election, but was defeated by challenger Kent Williams in a run-off primary election. Facing no challenger, Williams won the seat.

South Carolina Senate District 30 Democratic Primary Election, 2004
Party	Candidate	Votes	%
Democratic	Tim Norwood	5,765	32.47
Democratic	Kent Williams	5,772	32.51
Democratic	Maggie Wallace Glover	6,218	35.02
Total votes		17,755	100.00

South Carolina Senate District 30 General Election, 2004
Party	Candidate	Votes	%
Write-In	N/A	471	1.72
Democratic	Kent Williams	26,835	98.28
Total votes		27,306	100.00

=== District 31 ===
District thirty-one comprised portions of Chesterfield, Darlington, Florence, and Marlboro counties.

South Carolina Senate District 31 General Election, 2004
Party	Candidate	Votes	%
Democratic	Stephen J. Wukela	11,688	33.60
Republican	Hugh Leatherman	23,098	66.40
Total votes		34,786	100.00

=== District 32 ===
District thirty-two comprised portions of Florence, Georgetown, Horry, and Williamsburg counties.

South Carolina Senate District 32 Democratic Primary Election, 2004
Party	Candidate	Votes	%
Democratic	Ted Brown	4,673	46.40
Democratic	John Yancey McGill	5,398	53.60
Total votes		10,071	100.00

South Carolina Senate District 32 General Election, 2004
Party	Candidate	Votes	%
Democratic	John Yancey McGill	24,169	100.00
Total votes		24,169	100.00

=== District 33 ===
District thirty-three comprised portions of Horry county.

South Carolina Senate District 33 General Election, 2004
Party	Candidate	Votes	%
Democratic	Jara Uzenda	7,963	25.98
Republican	Luke A. Rankin	22,686	74.02
Total votes		30,649	100.00

=== District 34 ===
District thirty-four comprised portions of Charleston, Georgetown, and Horry counties. Incumbent Republican Senator Arthur Ravenel Jr. did not seek re-election, so a primary was held to nominate his replacement. Raymond Cleary won the primary and the seat in the general election.

South Carolina Senate District 34 Republican Primary Election, 2004
Party	Candidate	Votes	%
Republican	Ricky Horne	276	2.58
Republican	David Maring	3,611	33.80
Republican	Ray Cleary	6,796	63.62
Total votes		10,683	100.00

South Carolina Senate District 34 General Election, 2004
Party	Candidate	Votes	%
Republican	Ray Cleary	31,277	100.00
Total votes		31,277	100.00

=== District 35 ===
District thirty-five comprised portions of Sumter and Lee counties.

South Carolina Senate District 35 General Election, 2004
Party	Candidate	Votes	%
Republican	Dickie Jones	15,454	49.86
Democratic	Phil Leventis	15,540	50.14
Total votes		30,994	100.00

=== District 36 ===
District thirty-six comprised portions of Calhoun, Clarendon, Florence, Lee, and Sumter counties.

South Carolina Senate District 36 General Election, 2004
Party	Candidate	Votes	%
Republican	Bob Gibbons	10,037	30.96
Democratic	John C. Land, III	22,381	69.04
Total votes		32,418	100.00

=== District 37 ===
District thirty-seven comprised portions of Berkeley, Charleston, Colleton, and Dorchester counties.

South Carolina Senate District 37 General Election, 2004
Party	Candidate	Votes	%
Democratic	Stewart Powell	13,398	36.30
Republican	Larry Grooms	23,508	63.70
Total votes		36,906	100.00

=== District 38 ===
District thirty-eight comprised portions of Berkeley, Charleston, and Dorchester counties.

South Carolina Senate District 38 Republican Primary Election, 2004
Party	Candidate	Votes	%
Republican	Ben Cole	3,500	27.41
Republican	Bill Branton	4,219	33.05
Republican	Randy Scott	5,048	39.54
Total votes		12,767	100.00

South Carolina Senate District 38 Republican Primary Runoff Election, 2004
Party	Candidate	Votes	%
Republican	Bill Branton	3,266	33.39
Republican	Randy Scott	6,516	66.61
Total votes		9,782	100.00

South Carolina Senate District 38 General Election
Party	Candidate	Votes	%
Republican	Randy Scott	27,748	100.00
Total votes		27,748	100.00

=== District 39 ===
District thirty-nine comprised portions of Bamberg, Colleton, Dorchester, Hampton, and Orangeburg counties.

South Carolina Senate District 39 General Election
Party	Candidate	Votes	%
Democratic	John Matthews, Jr.	27,726	100.00
Total votes		27,726	100.00

=== District 40 ===
District forty comprised all of Barnwell County, with portions of Allendale, Hampton, and Orangeburg counties.

South Carolina Senate District 40 General Election, 2004
Party	Candidate	Votes	%
Republican	A. Clay Morris	9,413	28.64
Democratic	Brad Hutto	23,459	71.36
Total votes		32,872	100.00

=== District 41 ===
District forty-one comprised portions of Charleston and Dorchester counties.

South Carolina Senate District 41 General Election, 2004
Party	Candidate	Votes	%
Democratic	Justin Khan	15,360	35.91
Republican	Glenn McConnell	27,416	64.09
Total votes		42,776	100.00

=== District 42 ===
District forty-two comprised a portion of Charleston county.

South Carolina Senate District 42 Democratic Primary Election, 2004
Party	Candidate	Votes	%
Democratic	Brian Maxwell	320	10.65
Democratic	Robert Ford	2,684	89.35
Total votes		3,004	100.00

South Carolina Senate District 42 General Election, 2004
Party	Candidate	Votes	%
Independent	Maurice Washington	6,580	30.95
Democratic	Robert Ford	14,677	69.05
Total votes		21,257	100.00

=== District 43 ===
District forty-three comprised portions of Berkeley and Charleston counties. Incumbent Senator John Kuhn sought re-election, but was defeated in the primary by fellow Republican Chip Campsen. Campsen defeated his Democratic challenger and won the seat.

South Carolina Senate District 43 Republican Primary Election, 2004
Party	Candidate	Votes	%
Republican	Henry Fishburne	2,067	22.14
Republican	John Kuhn	3,378	36.17
Republican	Chip Campsen	3,893	41.69
Total votes		9,338	100.00

South Carolina Senate District 43 Republican Primary Runoff Election, 2004
Party	Candidate	Votes	%
Republican	John Kuhn	3,869	42.31
Republican	Chip Campsen	5,276	57.69
Total votes		9,145	100.00

South Carolina Senate District 43 General Election, 2004
Party	Candidate	Votes	%
Democratic	Constance Anastopoulo	13,087	36.70
Republican	Chip Campsen	22,570	63.30
Total votes		35,657	100.00

=== District 44 ===
District forty-four comprised portions of Berkeley and Charleston counties.

South Carolina Senate District 44 General Election, 2004
Party	Candidate	Votes	%
Democratic	Lindsay Banks	10,611	34.14
Republican	Bill Mescher	20,466	65.86
Total votes		31,077	100.00

=== District 45 ===
District forty-five comprised all Jasper County, along with of portions of Allendale, Beaufort, Charleston, Colleton, and Hampton counties.

South Carolina Senate District 45 General Election, 2004
Party	Candidate	Votes	%
Democratic	Clementa Pinckney	21,184	100.00
Total votes		21,184	100.00

=== District 46 ===
District forty-six comprised a portion of Beaufort County.

South Carolina Senate District 46 General Election, 2004
Party	Candidate	Votes	%
Write-in	N/A	455	1.20
Republican	Scott Richardson	37,250	98.80
Total votes		37,705	100.00

== See also ==
- 2004 South Carolina elections
- 2004 South Carolina Democratic presidential primary
- South Carolina Senate
- List of South Carolina state legislatures
