= 2008 South Carolina Senate election =

- November 4, 2008

All 46 seats in the South Carolina Senate 24 seats needed for a majority
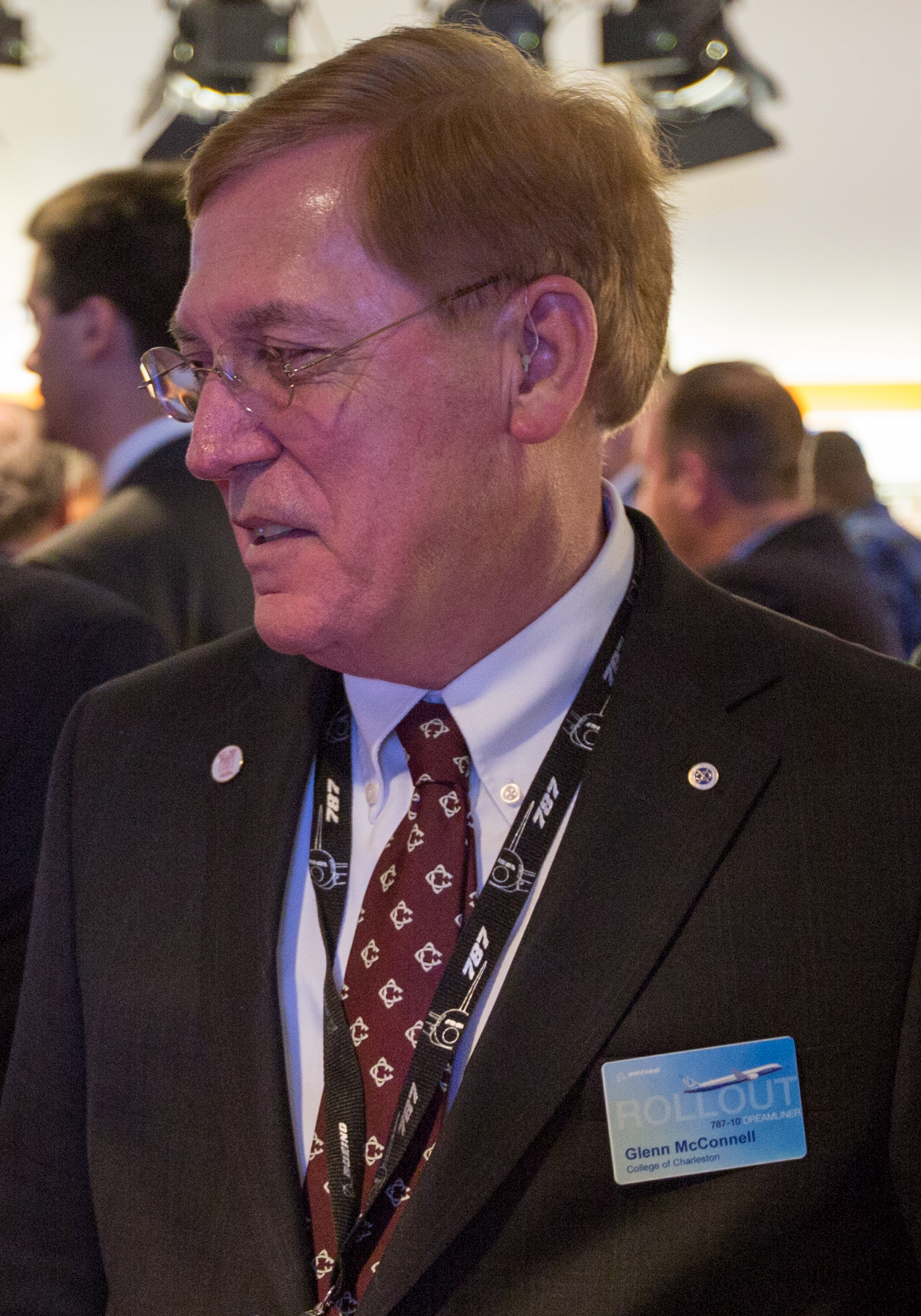

	Majority party	Minority party
Leader	Glenn F. McConnell	John C. Land III
Party	Republican	Democratic
Leader's seat	41st	36th
Last election	26	20
Seats before	27	19
Seats after	27	19
Seat change	Steady	Steady
- Results: Republican hold Democratic hold
President pro tempore before election
Glenn F. McConnell
Republican
Elected President pro tempore
Glenn F. McConnell
Republican

The 2008 South Carolina Senate election were held on Tuesday, November 4, 2008. The primary elections were held on June 10 and the runoff elections were held two weeks later on June 24. The current composition of the state delegation is 27 Republicans and 19 Democrats. Senators are elected for four-year terms, all in the same year.

== Predictions ==
Source	Ranking	As of
Stateline	Safe R	October 15, 2008

== Detailed Results ==
=== District 1 ===
District 1 covers parts of Oconee and Pickens Counties. Republican incumbent Thomas C. Alexander faced Polly Nicolay, a Constitution Party challenger. He was reelected to a fourth full-term in a landslide victory, receiving more than 85% of the vote.

South Carolina Senate District 1 General Election, 2008
Party	Candidate	Votes	%
Republican	Thomas C. Alexander (incumbent)	27,498	85.2
Constitution	Polly Nicolay	4,728	14.6
Write-In	Other	60	0.2
Total votes		32,286	100
hold			

=== District 2 ===
The district includes parts of Pickens county. Republican incumbent Larry A. Martin works in textiles for Alice Manufacturing Company. In the Republican primary, Martin won over C J Mac Martin Jr 80.15% to 19.85%.

=== District 3 ===
The district includes parts of Anderson county. Freshman Republican incumbent Kevin L. Bryant is a pharmacist. The Democratic nominee is Marshall Meadors, a family practice physician. In the first major controversy, which gained national attention, Bryant posted a controversial cartoon about Barack Obama on his blog on July 18, 2008, and Meadors answered in a July 22 press release. Bryant later removed the cartoon, but screenshots and commentary remain elsewhere.

=== District 4 ===
The district includes parts of Abbeville, Anderson and Greenwood counties. Republican incumbent William H. O'Dell is CEO of O'Dell Corporation. Capt. Leonardo Ortiz is the Democratic nominee, winning against Roger Odachowski 60.59% to 39.41% in the primary. .

=== District 5 ===
The district includes parts of Greenville county. Republican incumbent Lewis R. Vaughn is a retired businessman.

=== District 6 ===
The district includes parts of Greenville county. Republican incumbent Michael L. Fair works in insurance. In the Republican primary, Fair won over Patrick B Haddon 61.88% to 38.12%.

=== District 7 ===
The district includes parts of Greenville county. Democratic incumbent Ralph Anderson is a retired postmaster. In the Democratic primary, Anderson won over Lillian Brock Flemming, Andrew M Jones and Seldon Peden 51.19% to 35.21%, 4.18% and 9.42% respectively. He is being challenged by Republican Roan Garcia-Quintana and Constitution Party candidate John Langville.

=== District 8 ===
The district includes parts of Greenville county. Republican incumbent David L. Thomas is an attorney.

=== District 9 ===
The district includes parts of Greenville and Laurens counties. Republican incumbent Daniel B. Verdin III is the owner of Verdin's Farm and Garden Center.

=== District 10 ===
The district includes parts of Abbeville, Greenwood and Laurens counties. Democratic incumbent John W. Drummond is President of Drummond Oil Company, Inc. and President Pro Tempore Emeritus of the South Carolina Senate. In the Republican run-off, Dee Compton won over Chip Stockman, 68.89% to 31.11%.

=== District 11 ===
The district includes parts of Spartanburg county. Democratic incumbent Glenn G. Reese is a businessman.

=== District 12 ===
The district includes parts of Spartanburg county. Republican incumbent John D. Hawkins is an attorney. In the Republican run-off, Lee Bright won over Scott Talley 51.30% to 48.70%.

=== District 13 ===
The district includes parts of Greenville, Spartanburg and Union counties. Republican incumbent James H. Ritchie, Jr. is an attorney. In the Republican run-off, Shane Martin won over Ritchie 66.15% to 33.85%.

=== District 14 ===
The district includes parts of Cherokee, Spartanburg, Union and York counties. Republican incumbent Harvey S. Peeler, Jr. is a dairyman/businessman.

=== District 15 ===
The district includes parts of York county. Republican incumbent Robert W. Hayes, Jr. is an attorney.

=== District 16 ===
The district includes parts of Lancaster and York counties. Republican incumbent Chauncey K. Gregory is President of Builders Supply Company.

=== District 17 ===
The district includes parts of Chester, Fairfield, Union and York counties. Retiring Democratic incumbent Linda H. Short (Mrs. Paul) is a homemaker. In the Democratic run-off, Creighton B Coleman won over Leah Bess Moody 52.40% to 47.60%. In the primary, the results were Coleman (47.58%), Moody (37.09%) and Michael Squirewell (15.33%).

=== District 18 ===
The district includes Newberry and parts of Saluda and Lexington counties. Republican incumbent Ronnie Cromer is a pharmacist. The Democratic nominee is Michael Ray Ellisor, winning over Pete Oliver 52.30% to 47.70% in the primary.

=== District 19 ===
The district includes parts of Richland county. Democratic incumbent Kay Patterson is a retired educator. In the Democratic primary recount, John L Scott Jr. won over Vince Ford 50.47% to 49.53%.

=== District 20 ===
The district includes parts of Lexington and Richland counties. Republican incumbent John E. Courson is Senior V.P., Keenan & Suggs.

=== District 21 ===
The district includes parts of Richland county. Republican incumbent Darrell Jackson is a businessman and minister; Pres., Sunrise Enterprise of Columbia

=== District 22 ===
The district includes parts of Kershaw and Richland counties. Democratic incumbent Joel Lourie is a businessman

=== District 23 ===
The district includes parts of Lexington county. Republican incumbent John M. Knotts, Jr. is retired from law enforcement. In the Republican run-off, Knotts won over Katrina Shealy 57.52% to 42.48%.

=== District 24 ===
The district includes parts of Aiken county. Republican incumbent W. Greg Ryberg is CEO of REI, Inc.

=== District 25 ===
The district includes parts of Aiken, Edgefield, McCormick and Saluda counties. Freshman Republican incumbent A. Shane Massey is an attorney.

=== District 26 ===
The district includes parts of Aiken, Lexington and Saluda counties. Democratic incumbent Nikki G. Setzler is an attorney.

=== District 27 ===
The district includes parts of Chesterfield, Kershaw and Lancaster counties. Democratic incumbent Vincent A. Sheheen is an attorney.

=== District 28 ===
The district includes parts of Dillon, Horry, Marion and Marlboro counties. Democratic incumbent Dick Elliott is a real estate developer, retail.

=== District 29 ===
The district includes parts of Chesterfield, Darlington, Lee and Marlboro counties. Democratic incumbent Gerald Malloy is an attorney.

=== District 30 ===
The district includes parts of Dillon, Florence, Marion and Marlboro counties. Freshman Democratic incumbent Kent M. Williams is a Deputy County Administrator.

=== District 31 ===
The district includes parts of Darlington and Florence counties. Republican incumbent Hugh K. Leatherman, Sr. is a businessman.

=== District 32 ===
The district includes parts of Florence, Georgetown, Horry and Williamsburg counties. Democratic incumbent J. Yancey McGill is a real estate broker and residential homebuilder.

=== District 33 ===
The district includes parts of Horry county. Republican incumbent Luke A. Rankin is an attorney.

=== District 34 ===
The district includes parts of Charleston, Georgetown and Horry counties. Freshman Republican incumbent Raymond Cleary is a dentist.

=== District 35 ===
The district includes parts of Lee and Sumter counties. Democratic incumbent Phil P. Leventis is an aviation and management services consultant.

=== District 36 ===
The district includes parts of Calhoun, Clarendon, Florence and Sumter counties. Democratic incumbent John C. Land III is an attorney.

=== District 37 ===
The district includes parts of Berkeley, Charleston, Colleton and Dorchester counties. Republican incumbent Lawrence K. Grooms is president and CEO of GTI.

=== District 38 ===
The district includes parts of Charleston and Dorchester counties. Freshman Republican incumbent Randy Scott is a small businessman. Bill Collins qualified as a petition candidate and will have his name on the ballot in the general election.

=== District 39 ===
The district includes parts of Bamberg, Colleton, Dorchester, Hampton and Orangeburg counties. Democratic incumbent John W. Matthews, Jr. is a businessman and retired elementary school principal.

=== District 40 ===
The district includes parts of Allendale, Bamberg, Barnwell and Orangeburg counties. Democratic incumbent C. Bradley Hutto is a trial lawyer.

=== District 41 ===
The district includes parts of Charleston county. Republican incumbent Glenn F. McConnell is an attorney/businessman, and President Pro Tempore.

=== District 42 ===
The district includes parts of Charleston county. Democratic incumbent Robert Ford is a developer.

=== District 43 ===
The district includes parts of Berkeley and Charleston counties. Republican incumbent George E. Campsen III is a businessman/attorney. Dist. No. 43 - Berkeley & Charleston Cos.

=== District 44 ===
The district includes parts of Berkeley county. Freshman Republican incumbent Paul G. Campbell, Jr. is a retired Regional President for Alcoa, now a consultant.

=== District 45 ===
The district includes parts of Beaufort, Charleston, Colleton, Hampton and Jasper counties. Democratic incumbent Clementa C. Pinckney was a pastor and student.

=== District 46 ===
The district includes parts of Beaufort county. Republican incumbent Catherine C. Ceips is a full-time legislator.

== See also ==
- South Carolina Senate
