= 2000 South Carolina Senate election =

- November 7, 2000

All 46 seats in the South Carolina Senate 24 seats needed for a majority
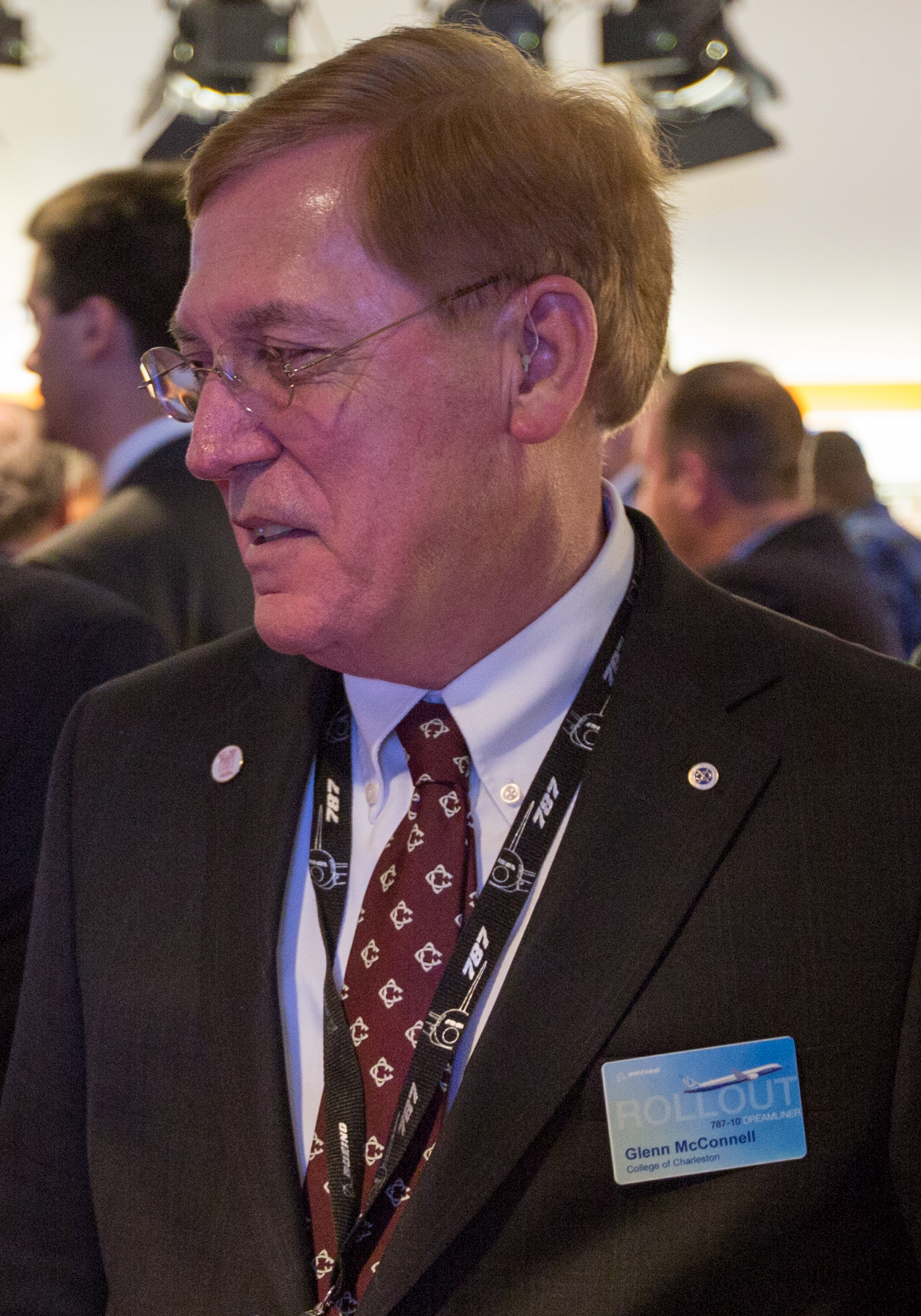

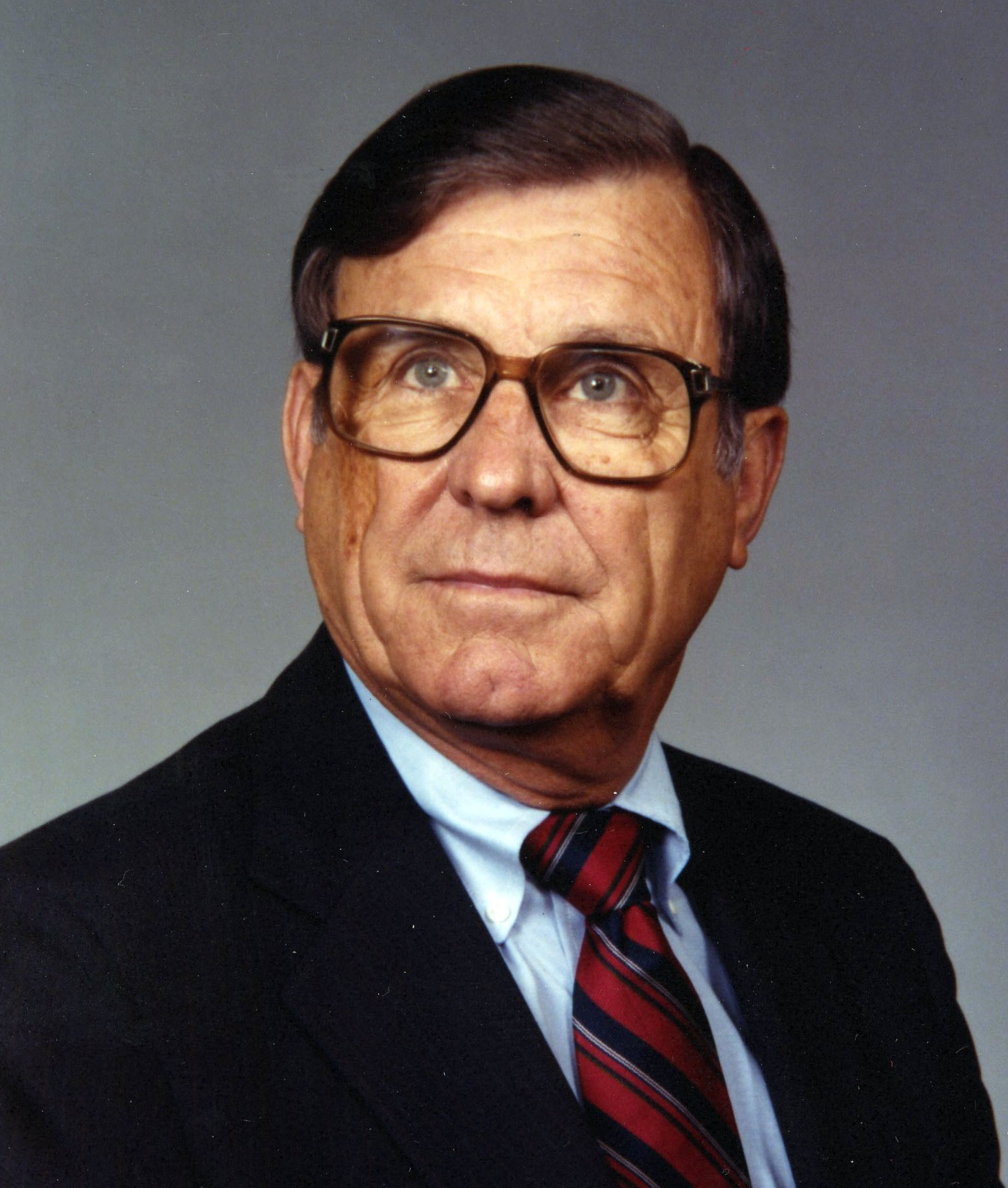
	Majority party	Minority party
Leader	Glenn F. McConnell	John W. Drummond
Party	Republican	Democratic
Leader since		January 1996
Leader's seat	District 41	District 10
Last election	21	25
Seats after	24 (Note: Initially the Senate was evenly split between Democrats and Republicans until Democrat J. Verne Smith of District 5 switched parties, giving Republicans a majority.)	22
Seat change	▲3	▼3
President pro tempore before election
John W. Drummond
Democratic
Elected President pro tempore
Glenn F. McConnell
Republican

The 2000 South Carolina Senate election was held on November 7, 2000, to determine which party would control the South Carolina Senate for the following four years in the 114th South Carolina General Assembly. All 46 seats in the South Carolina Senate were up for election. Prior to the election, 25 seats were held by Democrats and 21 seats were held by Republicans. The general election saw Republicans flip 2 seats, thereby leaving the Senate evenly split between Republicans and Democrats, until Democrat J. Verne Smith of District 5 switched parties, giving Republicans a majority in the State Senate for the first time since 1878.

== Retirements ==
=== Republicans ===
1. District 12: John R. Russell retired.
2. District 13: Charles Tyrone Courtney retired after being convicted on federal charges of bank fraud, mail fraud and making false statements in a loan application in June 2000.

=== Democrats ===
1. District 45: McKinley Washington Jr. retired.

== Defeated incumbents ==
=== In general ===
==== Democrats ====
1. District 9: James Edward Bryan Jr. lost re-election to Danny Verdin.

== Closest races ==
Seats where the margin of victory was under 10%:

1. District 37, 2.50%
2. District 33, 8.67%
3. District 9, 8.99% (gain)

== Results ==
=== District 1 ===
District 1 election, 2000
Party	Candidate	Votes	%
Republican	Thomas C. Alexander (incumbent)	21,380	99.87%
	Scattering	27	0.13%
Total votes		21,407	100.0%
Republican hold			

=== District 2 ===
District 2 election, 2000
Party	Candidate	Votes	%
Republican	Larry A. Martin (incumbent)	25,493	99.50%
	Scattering	128	0.50%
Total votes		25,621	100.0%
Republican hold			

=== District 3 ===
District 3 election, 2000
Party	Candidate	Votes	%
Republican	Robert L. Waldrep Jr. (incumbent)	26,069	99.97%
	Scattering	8	0.03%
Total votes		26,077	100.0%
Republican hold			

=== District 4 ===
District 4 election, 2000
Party	Candidate	Votes	%
Democratic	William H. O'Dell (incumbent)	14,534	58.83%
Republican	E. Blair Rice Jr.	10,171	41.17%
Total votes		24,705	100.0%
Democratic hold			

=== District 5 ===
District 5 election, 2000
Party	Candidate	Votes	%
Democratic	Verne J. Smith (Note: Switched parties to the Republicans following the election in order to break a tie between Democratic and Republican control of the chamber.) (incumbent)	17,081	78.21%
Republican	Stacey B. Schaller	4,659	21.33%
	Scattering	100	0.46%
Total votes		21,840	100.0%
Democratic hold			

=== District 6 ===
District 6 election, 2000
Party	Candidate	Votes	%
Republican	Mike Fair (incumbent)	28,048	97.63%
	Scattering	680	2.37%
Total votes		28,728	100.0%
Republican hold			

=== District 7 ===
District 7 election, 2000
Party	Candidate	Votes	%
Democratic	Ralph Anderson (incumbent)	14,417	63.99%
Republican	Allen Bunk Johnson	8,083	35.88%
	Scattering	30	0.13%
Total votes		22,530	100.0%
Democratic hold			

=== District 8 ===
District 8 election, 2000
Party	Candidate	Votes	%
Republican	David L. Thomas (incumbent)	32,720	88.53%
Democratic	Al Hafer	4,097	11.09%
	Scattering	139	0.38%
Total votes		36,956	100.0%
Republican hold			

=== District 9 ===
District 9 election, 2000
Party	Candidate	Votes	%
Republican	Danny Verdin	16,793	54.47%
Democratic	James Edward Bryan Jr. (incumbent)	14,024	45.48%
	Scattering	16	0.05%
Total votes		30,833	100.0%
Republican gain from Democratic			

=== District 10 ===
District 10 election, 2000
Party	Candidate	Votes	%
Democratic	John W. Drummond (incumbent)	16,021	59.33%
Republican	Hunter Eddy	10,974	40.64%
	Scattering	7	0.03%
Total votes		27,002	100.0%
Democratic hold			

=== District 11 ===
District 11 election, 2000
Party	Candidate	Votes	%
Democratic	Glenn G. Reese (incumbent)	13,120	57.84%
Republican	Steve A. Parker	9,558	42.13%
	Scattering	7	0.03%
Total votes		22,685	100.0%
Democratic hold			

=== District 12 ===
District 12 election, 2000
Party	Candidate	Votes	%
Republican	John D. Hawkins	20,341	68.63%
Democratic	Edgar M. Poole Jr.	9,243	31.23%
	Scattering	11	0.04%
Total votes		29,595	100.0%
Republican hold			

=== District 13 ===
District 13 election, 2000
Party	Candidate	Votes	%
Republican	James H. Ritchie Jr.	18,708	66.41%
Democratic	Brian K. Kennedy	9,455	33.56%
	Scattering	9	0.03%
Total votes		28,172	100.0%
Republican hold			

=== District 14 ===
District 14 election, 2000
Party	Candidate	Votes	%
Republican	Harvey S. Peeler Jr. (incumbent)	21,739	99.76%
	Scattering	52	0.24%
Total votes		21,791	100.0%
Republican hold			

=== District 15 ===
District 15 election, 2000
Party	Candidate	Votes	%
Republican	Robert W. Hayes Jr. (incumbent)	26,166	99.88%
	Scattering	30	0.12%
Total votes		26,196	100.0%
Republican hold			

=== District 16 ===
District 16 election, 2000
Party	Candidate	Votes	%
Republican	Greg Gregory (incumbent)	22,488	99.21%
	Scattering	180	0.79%
Total votes		22,668	100.0%
Republican hold			

=== District 17 ===
District 17 election, 2000
Party	Candidate	Votes	%
Democratic	Linda H. Short (incumbent)	19,585	82.99%
Republican	Danny W. Parker	4,011	17.00%
	Scattering	3	0.01%
Total votes		23,599	100.0%
Democratic hold			

=== District 18 ===
District 18 election, 2000
Party	Candidate	Votes	%
Republican	André Bauer (incumbent)	19,558	63.89%
Democratic	Dave C. Waldrop Jr.	11,043	36.08%
	Scattering	8	0.03%
Total votes		30,609	100.0%
Republican hold			

=== District 19 ===
District 19 election, 2000
Party	Candidate	Votes	%
Democratic	Kay Patterson (incumbent)	22,391	99.04%
	Scattering	218	0.96%
Total votes		22,609	100.0%
Democratic hold			

=== District 20 ===
District 20 election, 2000
Party	Candidate	Votes	%
Republican	John Courson (incumbent)	21,624	60.23%
Democratic	Tony Mizzell	14,263	39.72%
	Scattering	19	0.05%
Total votes		35,906	100.0%
Republican hold			

=== District 21 ===
District 21 election, 2000
Party	Candidate	Votes	%
Democratic	Darrell Jackson (incumbent)	15,180	98.17%
	Scattering	283	1.83%
Total votes		15,463	100.0%
Democratic hold			

=== District 22 ===
District 22 election, 2000
Party	Candidate	Votes	%
Republican	Warren Giese (incumbent)	22,764	55.86%
Democratic	Toby Ward	17,974	44.10%
	Scattering	18	0.04%
Total votes		40,756	100.0%
Republican hold			

=== District 23 ===
District 23 election, 2000
Party	Candidate	Votes	%
Republican	Joe Wilson (incumbent)	35,241	100.0%
Total votes		35,241	100.0%
Republican hold			

=== District 24 ===
District 24 election, 2000
Party	Candidate	Votes	%
Republican	W. Greg Ryberg (incumbent)	28,548	99.55%
	Scattering	128	0.45%
Total votes		28,676	100.0%
Republican hold			

=== District 25 ===
District 25 election, 2000
Party	Candidate	Votes	%
Democratic	Tommy Moore (incumbent)	19,382	67.01%
Republican	Robert G. Gossett	9,542	32.99%
	Scattering	1	0.00%
Total votes		28,925	100.0%
Democratic hold			

=== District 26 ===
District 26 election, 2000
Party	Candidate	Votes	%
Democratic	Nikki G. Setzler (incumbent)	17,571	55.74%
Republican	W. Gary Prince	13,213	41.91%
	Scattering	742	2.35%
Total votes		31,526	100.0%
Democratic hold			

=== District 27 ===
District 27 election, 2000
Party	Candidate	Votes	%
Democratic	Donald Holland (incumbent)	19,844	68.09%
Republican	Bart Hayward	9,272	31.81%
	Scattering	30	0.10%
Total votes		29,146	100.0%
Democratic hold			

=== District 28 ===
District 28 election, 2000
Party	Candidate	Votes	%
Democratic	Dick Elliott (incumbent)	21,923	99.68%
	Scattering	70	0.32%
Total votes		21,993	100.0%
Democratic hold			

=== District 29 ===
District 29 election, 2000
Party	Candidate	Votes	%
Democratic	Edward Eli Saleeby (incumbent)	20,946	99.50%
	Scattering	106	0.50%
Total votes		21,052	100.0%
Democratic hold			

=== District 30 ===
District 30 election, 2000
Party	Candidate	Votes	%
Democratic	Maggie Wallace Glover (incumbent)	18,145	99.32%
	Scattering	124	0.68%
Total votes		18,269	100.0%
Democratic hold			

=== District 31 ===
District 31 election, 2000
Party	Candidate	Votes	%
Republican	Hugh Leatherman (incumbent)	17,130	55.98%
Democratic	Patsy Stone	13,467	44.01%
	Scattering	4	0.01%
Total votes		30,601	100.0%
Republican hold			

=== District 32 ===
District 32 election, 2000
Party	Candidate	Votes	%
Democratic	Yancey McGill (incumbent)	22,372	100.0%
Total votes		22,372	100.0%
Democratic hold			

=== District 33 ===
District 33 election, 2000
Party	Candidate	Votes	%
Democratic	Luke A. Rankin (incumbent)	17,811	54.33%
Republican	Allan Clemmons	14,967	45.66%
	Scattering	3	0.01%
Total votes		32,781	100.0%
Democratic hold			

=== District 34 ===
District 34 election, 2000
Party	Candidate	Votes	%
Republican	Arthur Ravenel Jr. (incumbent)	30,078	99.79%
	Scattering	63	0.21%
Total votes		30,141	100.0%
Republican hold			

=== District 35 ===
District 35 election, 2000
Party	Candidate	Votes	%
Democratic	Phil P. Leventis (incumbent)	15,102	59.84%
Republican	Blane Lawson	10,133	40.16%
Total votes		25,235	100.0%
Democratic hold			

=== District 36 ===
District 36 election, 2000
Party	Candidate	Votes	%
Democratic	John C. Land III (incumbent)	20,818	73.81%
Republican	Gary McLeod	7,383	26.18%
	Scattering	2	0.01%
Total votes		28,199	100.0%
Democratic hold			

=== District 37 ===
District 37 election, 2000
Party	Candidate	Votes	%
Republican	Larry Grooms (incumbent)	15,970	51.21%
Democratic	George Bailey	15,188	48.71%
	Scattering	25	0.08%
Total votes		31,183	100.0%
Republican hold			

=== District 38 ===
District 38 election, 2000
Party	Candidate	Votes	%
Republican	William S. Branton (incumbent)	20,786	99.64%
	Scattering	75	0.36%
Total votes		20,861	100.0%
Republican hold			

=== District 39 ===
District 39 election, 2000
Party	Candidate	Votes	%
Democratic	John W. Matthews Jr. (incumbent)	23,125	99.21%
	Scattering	185	0.79%
Total votes		23,310	100.0%
Democratic hold			

=== District 40 ===
District 40 election, 2000
Party	Candidate	Votes	%
Democratic	Brad Hutto (incumbent)	24,602	90.78%
Libertarian	Jonathan M. Hare	2,456	9.06%
	Scattering	43	0.16%
Total votes		27,101	100.0%
Democratic hold			

=== District 41 ===
District 41 election, 2000
Party	Candidate	Votes	%
Republican	Glenn F. McConnell (incumbent)	27,739	99.82%
	Scattering	51	0.18%
Total votes		27,790	100.0%
Republican hold			

=== District 42 ===
District 42 election, 2000
Party	Candidate	Votes	%
Democratic	Robert Ford (incumbent)	14,263	99.36%
	Scattering	92	0.64%
Total votes		14,355	100.0%
Democratic hold			

=== District 43 ===
District 43 election, 2000
Party	Candidate	Votes	%
Democratic	Ernie Passailaigue (incumbent)	8,330	61.60%
Republican	Lanneau Siegling	5,166	38.21%
	Scattering	25	0.19%
Total votes		13,521	100.0%
Democratic hold			

=== District 44 ===
District 44 election, 2000
Party	Candidate	Votes	%
Republican	Bill Mescher (incumbent)	23,889	99.90%
	Scattering	23	0.10%
Total votes		23,912	100.0%
Republican hold			

=== District 45 ===
District 45 election, 2000
Party	Candidate	Votes	%
Democratic	Clementa C. Pinckney	20,088	62.95%
Republican	Curtis Brantley	11,803	36.99%
	Scattering	20	0.06%
Total votes		31,911	100.0%
Democratic hold			

=== District 46 ===
District 46 election, 2000
Party	Candidate	Votes	%
Republican	Scott Richardson (incumbent)	28,677	98.79%
	Scattering	351	1.21%
Total votes		29,028	100.0%
Republican hold			
