= 2012 South Carolina Senate election =

- November 6, 2012

All 46 seats in the South Carolina Senate 24 seats needed for a majority
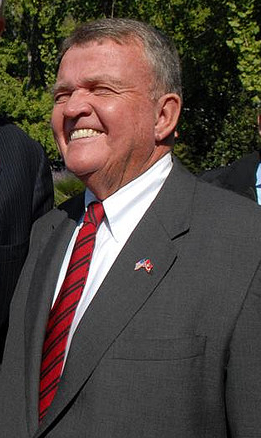

	Majority party	Minority party
Leader	John Courson	John C. Land III
Party	Republican	Democratic
Leader's seat	20th	36th
Last election	27	19
Seats before	27	19
Seats after	28	18
Seat change	▲1	▼1
- Results: Republican gain Republican hold Democratic hold
President pro tempore before election
John Courson
Republican
Elected President pro tempore
John Courson
Republican

The 2012 South Carolina Senate elections were held on Tuesday, November 6, 2012. The primary elections were held on June 12 and the runoff elections were held two weeks later on June 26. The current composition of the state delegation is 28 Republicans and 18 Democrats. Senators are elected for four-year terms, all in the same year.

== Predictions ==
Source	Ranking	As of
Governing	Safe R	October 24, 2012

== Detailed Results ==
=== District 1 ===
District 1 covers parts of Oconee and Pickens Counties. Incumbent Thomas C. Alexander ran unopposed in the Republican primary and the general election. He was reelected to his fifth full-term as senator.

South Carolina Senate District 1 General Election, 2012
Party	Candidate	Votes	%
Republican	Thomas C. Alexander (incumbent)	29,957	99.1
Write-in	Other	270	0.9
Total votes		30,227	100.0
Republican hold			

=== District 2 ===
The district includes parts of Pickens county. Republican incumbent Larry A. Martin faced Republican petition candidate Rex Rice in the general election. Rice was initially on the Republican primary ballot, but due to a lawsuit about proper filing of economic interest statements, he and many other state candidates were decertified. To get on the November ballot instead, Rice pursued the little-used paper process of getting signatures of at least five percent of the district's registered voters. Martin won with 64% of the vote.

South Carolina Senate District 2 General Election, 2012
Party	Candidate	Votes	%
Republican	Larry A. Martin (incumbent)	24,013	64.4
Republican	Rex Rice (petition)	13,164	35.43
Write-in	Other	108	0.3
Total votes		37,285	100.0
Republican hold			

=== District 3 ===
The district includes parts of Anderson county. Republican incumbent Kevin L. Bryant is a pharmacist. In the Republican primary, Bryant won over Don Bowen 75.93% to 24.07%.

=== District 4 ===
The district includes parts of Abbeville, Anderson and Greenwood counties. Republican incumbent William H. O'Dell is CEO of O'Dell Corporation.

=== District 5 ===
The district includes parts of Greenville and, Spartanburg counties. Retiring Republican incumbent Phillip Shoopman is a retired businessman. Tom Corbin won the election for District 5 after defeating Amanda Tieder Somers in the Republican primary.

2012 South Carolina Senate District 4 Republican Primary
Party	Candidate	Votes	%
Republican	Tom Corbin	3,050	65.4
Republican	Amanda Tieder Somers	1,616	34.6
Total votes		4,666	100.0

2012 South Carolina Senate District 4 General Election
Party	Candidate	Votes	%
Republican	Tom Corbin	33,491	98.8
Write-in		406	1.2
Total votes		33,897	100.0
Republican hold			

=== District 6 ===
The district includes parts of Greenville county. Republican incumbent Michael L. Fair works in insurance.

=== District 7 ===
The district includes parts of Greenville county. Retiring Democratic incumbent Ralph Anderson is a retired postmaster. In the Democratic primary, Karl B Allen defeated Lillian Brock Flemming 54.83% to 45.17%.

=== District 8 ===
The district includes parts of Greenville county. Retiring Republican incumbent David L. Thomas is an attorney. In the Republican run-off, Ross Turner won over Joe Swann 50.32% to 49.68%.

=== District 9 ===
The district includes parts of Greenville and Laurens counties. Republican incumbent Daniel B. Verdin III is the owner of Verdin's Farm and Garden Center.

=== District 10 ===
The district includes parts of Abbeville, Greenwood and Laurens counties. Democratic incumbent John W. Drummond is President of Drummond Oil Company, Inc. and President Pro Tempore Emeritus of the South Carolina Senate.

=== District 11 ===
The district includes parts of Spartanburg county. Democratic incumbent Glenn G. Reese is a businessman.

=== District 12 ===
The district includes parts of Spartanburg county. Freshman Republican incumbent Lee Bright is a school board member.

=== District 13 ===
The district includes parts of Greenville, Spartanburg and Union counties. Freshman Republican incumbent Shane Martin is an attorney.

=== District 14 ===
The district includes parts of Cherokee, Spartanburg, Union and York counties. Republican incumbent Harvey S. Peeler, Jr. is a dairyman/businessman.

=== District 15 ===
The district includes parts of York county. Republican incumbent Robert W. Hayes, Jr. is an attorney.

=== District 16 ===
The district includes parts of Lancaster and York counties. Republican incumbent Chauncey K. Gregory is President of Builders Supply Company.

=== District 17 ===
The district includes parts of Chester, Fairfield, Union and York counties. Democratic incumbent Creighton B. Coleman is an attorney.

=== District 18 ===
The district includes Newberry and parts of Saluda and Lexington counties. Republican incumbent Ronnie Cromer is a pharmacist. The Democratic nominee is Michael Ray Ellisor, winning over Pete Oliver 52.30% to 47.70% in the primary.

=== District 19 ===
The district includes parts of Richland county. Democratic incumbent John L. Scott Jr. is a small business owner.

=== District 20 ===
The district includes parts of Lexington and Richland counties. Republican incumbent John E. Courson is Senior V.P., Keenan & Suggs. Courson was challenged by Green Party candidate Scott West. West worked for the Tom Clements US Senate campaign in 2010.

=== District 21 ===
The district includes parts of Richland county. Republican incumbent Darrell Jackson is a businessman and minister; Pres., Sunrise Enterprise of Columbia

=== District 22 ===
The district includes parts of Kershaw and Richland counties. Democratic incumbent Joel Lourie is a businessman

=== District 23 ===
The district includes parts of Lexington county. Republican incumbent John M. Knotts, Jr. is retired from law enforcement. In the Republican run-off, Knotts won over Katrina Shealy 57.52% to 42.48%.

=== District 24 ===
The district includes parts of Aiken county. Republican incumbent W. Greg Ryberg is CEO of REI, Inc.

=== District 25 ===
The district includes parts of Aiken, Edgefield, McCormick and Saluda counties. Freshman Republican incumbent A. Shane Massey is an attorney.

=== District 26 ===
The district includes parts of Aiken, Lexington and Saluda counties. Democratic incumbent Nikki G. Setzler is an attorney.

=== District 27 ===
The district includes parts of Chesterfield, Kershaw and Lancaster counties. Democratic incumbent Vincent A. Sheheen is an attorney.

=== District 28 ===
The district includes parts of Dillon, Horry, Marion and Marlboro counties. Democratic incumbent Dick Elliott is a real estate developer, retail.

=== District 29 ===
The district includes parts of Chesterfield, Darlington, Lee and Marlboro counties. Democratic incumbent Gerald Malloy is an attorney.

=== District 30 ===
The district includes parts of Dillon, Florence, Marion and Marlboro counties. Freshman Democratic incumbent Kent M. Williams is a Deputy County Administrator.

=== District 31 ===
The district includes parts of Darlington and Florence counties. Republican incumbent Hugh K. Leatherman, Sr. is a businessman.

=== District 32 ===
The district includes parts of Florence, Georgetown, Horry and Williamsburg counties. Democratic incumbent J. Yancey McGill is a real estate broker and residential homebuilder. In the Democratic primary recount, J. Yancey McGill won over Cezar E McKnight 50.32% to 49.68%.

=== District 33 ===
The district includes parts of Horry county. Republican incumbent Luke A. Rankin is an attorney.

=== District 34 ===
The district includes parts of Charleston, Georgetown and Horry counties. Republican incumbent Raymond Cleary is a dentist.

=== District 35 ===
The district includes parts of Lee and Sumter counties. Retiring Democratic incumbent Phil P. Leventis is an aviation and management services consultant. In the Republican run-off, Tony Barwick won over Wade Kolb 56.86% to 43.14%.

=== District 36 ===
The district includes parts of Calhoun, Clarendon, Florence and Sumter counties. Democratic incumbent John C. Land III is an attorney.

=== District 37 ===
The district includes parts of Berkeley, Charleston, Colleton and Dorchester counties. Republican incumbent Lawrence K. Grooms is president and CEO of GTI.

=== District 38 ===
The district includes parts of Charleston and Dorchester counties. Freshman Republican incumbent Randy Scott is a small businessman. Bill Collins qualified as a petition candidate and will have his name on the ballot in the general election.

=== District 39 ===
The district includes parts of Bamberg, Colleton, Dorchester, Hampton and Orangeburg counties. Democratic incumbent John W. Matthews, Jr. is a businessman and retired elementary school principal.

=== District 40 ===
The district includes parts of Allendale, Bamberg, Barnwell and Orangeburg counties. Democratic incumbent C. Bradley Hutto is a trial lawyer.

=== District 41 ===
The district includes parts of Charleston county. Republican incumbent Glenn F. McConnell is an attorney/businessman, and President Pro Tempore.

=== District 42 ===
The district includes parts of Charleston county. Democratic incumbent Robert Ford is a developer.

=== District 43 ===
The district includes parts of Berkeley and Charleston counties. Republican incumbent George E. Campsen III is a businessman/attorney. Dist. No. 43 - Berkeley & Charleston Cos.

=== District 44 ===
The district includes parts of Berkeley county. Freshman Republican incumbent Paul G. Campbell, Jr. is a retired Regional President for Alcoa, now a consultant.

=== District 45 ===
The district includes parts of Beaufort, Charleston, Colleton, Hampton and Jasper counties. Democratic incumbent Clementa C. Pinckney was a pastor and student.

=== District 46 ===
The district includes parts of Beaufort county. Republican incumbent Catherine C. Ceips is a full-time legislator.

== See also ==
- South Carolina Senate
