= South Carolina General Assembly =

Legislative branch of the state government of South Carolina

- Great Seal of the State of South Carolina

Type
- Type: Bicameral
- Houses: Senate; House of Representatives

History
- Founded: 1753; 273 years ago

Leadership
- Senate President: Thomas Alexander (R) since December 6, 2021
- House Speaker: Murrell Smith (R) since May 12, 2022

Structure
- Seats: 170 voting members: 46 Senators; 124 Representatives
- Senate political groups: Majority: Republican (34); Minority: Democratic (12)
- House political groups: Majority: Republican (89); Minority: Democratic (35)

Elections
- Last Senate election: 5 November 2024
- Last House election: 5 November 2024
- Next Senate election: November 7, 2028
- Next House election: November 3, 2026

Meeting place
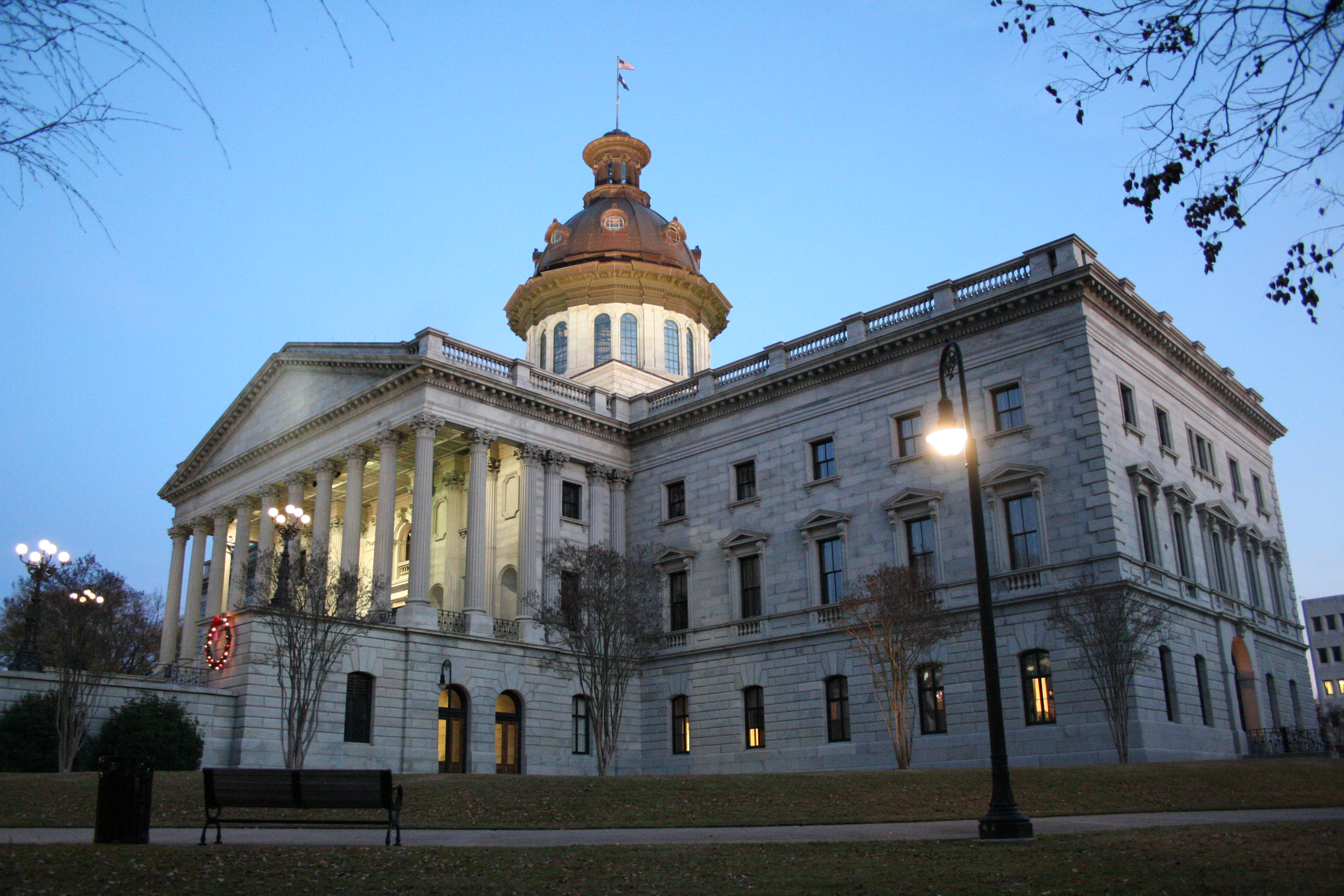
- South Carolina State House; Columbia

Website
- scstatehouse.gov

Constitution
- Constitution of South Carolina

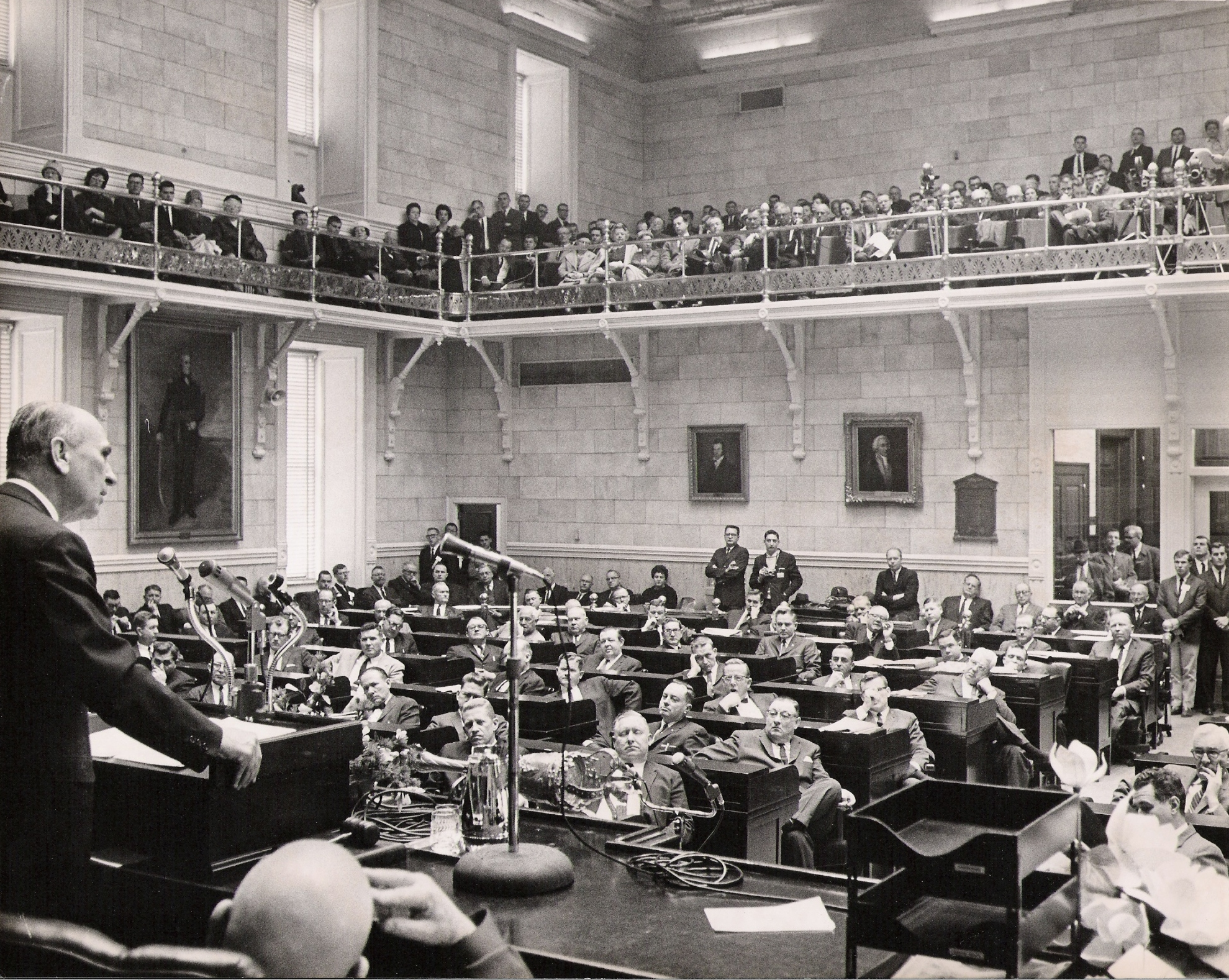
Governor Donald Russell addressing the Assembly in 1964

The South Carolina General Assembly, also called the South Carolina Legislature, is the state legislature of the U.S. state of South Carolina. The legislature is bicameral and consists of the lower South Carolina House of Representatives and the upper South Carolina Senate. All together, the General Assembly consists of 170 members. The legislature convenes at the State House in Columbia.

Prior to the 1964 federal Reynolds v. Sims decision by the U.S. Supreme Court, each county doubled as a legislative district, with each county electing one senator and at least one representative. Moreover, each county's General Assembly delegation also doubled as its county council, as the state constitution made no provision for local government.

The "one man, one vote" provision of Reynolds v. Sims caused district lines to cross county lines, causing legislators to be on multiple county councils. This led to the passage of the Home Rule Act of 1975, which created county councils that were independent of the General Assembly. However, the General Assembly still retains considerable authority over local government. As a result, the legislature still devotes considerable time to local matters, and county legislative delegations still handle many matters that are handled by county governments in the rest of the country.

There are 124 members of the South Carolina House of Representatives, who are elected every two years, and the South Carolina Senate has 46 members, elected every four years concurrent to the presidential election. For both houses, there are no term limits. The General Assembly meets in joint session to elect judges, with all 170 members having an equal vote in such elections.

== Role ==
The main role of the South Carolina General Assembly is to pass laws "as the common good may require." In order for a bill to become law, both the Senate and House of Representatives must vote to pass the bill by a simple majority. Then the bill must be sent to the governor. If the governor vetoes the bill, both houses can either sustain the veto or override the veto. Veto overrides require a two-thirds majority. Once he receives the bill, if the governor neither signs nor vetoes the bill, it becomes law after five days, Sundays excluded.

== Qualifications ==
=== Senators ===
According to the South Carolina Constitution, no person may serve as a senator who:

- Is not qualified to vote in state elections
- Is not a resident of the district in which he or she seeks to represent
- Is not at least 25 years of age
- Has been convicted of or pleaded guilty to a felony or voter fraud or bribery unless 15 years has elapsed since the time was served.

=== Representatives ===
According to the South Carolina Constitution, no person may serve as a representative who:

- Is not qualified to vote in state elections
- Is not a resident of the district in which he or she seeks to represent
- Is not at least 21 years of age
- Has been convicted of or pleaded guilty to a felony or voter fraud or bribery unless 15 years has elapsed since the time was served.

== Officers ==
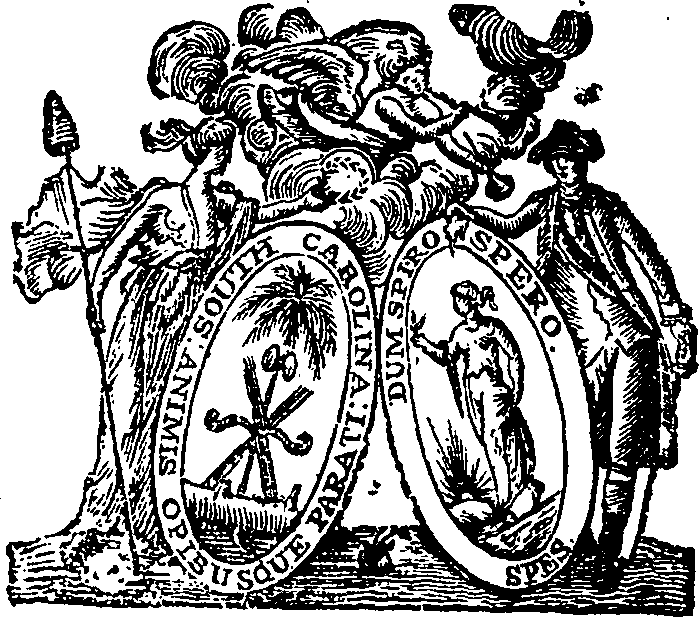
Seal of the General Assembly, c. 1790.

=== Senate ===
South Carolina Senate officers
Position	Name	Party
President of the Senate	Thomas C. Alexander	Republican
Majority Leader	A. Shane Massey	Republican
Minority Leader	Brad Hutto	Democratic

=== House of Representatives ===
South Carolina House of Representatives officers
Position	Name	Party
Speaker	Murrell Smith	Republican
Speaker pro tempore	Tommy Pope (politician)	Republican
Majority Leader	Davey Hiott	Republican
Minority Leader	J. Todd Rutherford	Democratic

== Historic party control ==
Statehouse Party Control since 1868
Year (Note: Years reflected in chart match gubernatorial elections)	Senate Majority	House Majority	Governor Control
1868	Republican	Republican	Republican
1870	Republican	Republican	Republican
1872	Republican	Republican	Republican
1874	Republican	Republican	Republican
1876	Republican	Democratic	Democratic
1878	Democratic	Democratic	Democratic
1880	Democratic	Democratic	Democratic
1882	Democratic	Democratic	Democratic
1884	Democratic	Democratic	Democratic
1886	Democratic	Democratic	Democratic
1888	Democratic	Democratic	Democratic
1890	Democratic	Democratic	Democratic
1892	Democratic	Democratic	Democratic
1894	Democratic	Democratic	Democratic
1896	Democratic	Democratic	Democratic
1898	Democratic	Democratic	Democratic
1900	Democratic	Democratic	Democratic
1902	Democratic	Democratic	Democratic
1904	Democratic	Democratic	Democratic
1906	Democratic	Democratic	Democratic
1908	Democratic	Democratic	Democratic
1910	Democratic	Democratic	Democratic
1912	Democratic	Democratic	Democratic
1914	Democratic	Democratic	Democratic
1916	Democratic	Democratic	Democratic
1918	Democratic	Democratic	Democratic
1920	Democratic	Democratic	Democratic
1922	Democratic	Democratic	Democratic
1924	Democratic	Democratic	Democratic
1926	Democratic	Democratic	Democratic
1930	Democratic	Democratic	Democratic
1934	Democratic	Democratic	Democratic
1938	Democratic	Democratic	Democratic
1942	Democratic	Democratic	Democratic
1946	Democratic	Democratic	Democratic
1950	Democratic	Democratic	Democratic
1954	Democratic	Democratic	Democratic
1958	Democratic	Democratic	Democratic
1962	Democratic	Democratic	Democratic
1966	Democratic	Democratic	Democratic
1970	Democratic	Democratic	Democratic
1974	Democratic	Democratic	Republican
1978	Democratic	Democratic	Democratic
1982	Democratic	Democratic	Democratic
1986	Democratic	Democratic	Republican
1990	Democratic	Democratic	Republican
1994	Democratic	Republican	Republican
1998	Republican	Republican	Democratic
2002	Republican	Republican	Republican
2006	Republican	Republican	Republican
2010	Republican	Republican	Republican
2014	Republican	Republican	Republican
2018	Republican	Republican	Republican
2022	Republican	Republican	Republican
2024	Republican	Republican	Republican
2026	TBD	Republican	TBD

== See also ==
- South Carolina State House
- South Carolina House of Representatives
- South Carolina Senate
- List of South Carolina state legislatures
- South Carolina government and politics
- Governor of South Carolina
- Lieutenant Governor of South Carolina
- South Carolina Code of Laws
