= List of South Carolina state legislatures =

The following is a list of legislative terms of the South Carolina General Assembly, the law-making branch of government of the U.S. state of South Carolina. South Carolina became part of the United States on May 23, 1788.

== Legislatures ==
Number	Name	Start date	End date	Last election
South Carolina Constitution of 1778 (Note: The South Carolina Constitution of 1778, Section XII, specified election of state senators annually in November. Section XIII specified election of state House members in November every two years. Sessions for both houses started in January.)
?				
South Carolina Constitution of 1790 (Note: The South Carolina Constitution of 1790, Section I, specified election in October of House members every two years, and Senators every four years. Annual sessions began in November.)
?		1790		1790
9	9th South Carolina General Assembly	1791	1791	
10	10th South Carolina General Assembly	1792	1794	1792
11	11th South Carolina General Assembly	1794	1795	1794
12	12th South Carolina General Assembly	1796	1797	1796
13	13th South Carolina General Assembly	1798	1799	October 1798
14	14th South Carolina General Assembly	1800		1800
15	15th South Carolina General Assembly	1802	1804	1802
16	16th South Carolina General Assembly	1804	1805	1804
17	17th South Carolina General Assembly	1806	1808	1806
18	18th South Carolina General Assembly	1808	1809	1808
19	19th South Carolina General Assembly	1810	1812	1810
20	20th South Carolina General Assembly	1812	1813	1812
21	21st South Carolina General Assembly	1814	1815	1814
22	22nd South Carolina General Assembly	1816	1817	1816
23	23rd South Carolina General Assembly	1818	1819	1818
24	24th South Carolina General Assembly	1820	1821	1820
25	25th South Carolina General Assembly	1822	1823	1822
26	26th South Carolina General Assembly	1824	1825	1824
27	27th South Carolina General Assembly	1826	1828	
28	28th South Carolina General Assembly	1828	1829	
29	29th South Carolina General Assembly	1830	1831	
30	30th South Carolina General Assembly	1832	1833	
31	31st South Carolina General Assembly	1834	1835	
32	32nd South Carolina General Assembly	1836	1837	
33	33rd South Carolina General Assembly	1838	1839	
34?			ca.1841	
35	35th South Carolina General Assembly			
36	36th South Carolina General Assembly			
37	37th South Carolina General Assembly			
38	38th South Carolina General Assembly			
39	39th South Carolina General Assembly			
40	40th South Carolina General Assembly			
41?			ca.1855	
South Carolina Constitution of 1861
?				
South Carolina Constitution of 1865 (Note: The South Carolina Constitution of 1865, Article I, specified election in October of House members every two years, and Senators every four years. Annual sessions began in November.)
?				
South Carolina Constitution of 1868 (Note: The South Carolina Constitution of 1868, Article II, specified election in October of House members every two years, and Senators every four years. Annual sessions began in November.)
48?		May 1868		April 1868
49?		November 1870		October 1870
50	50th South Carolina General Assembly			
51	51st South Carolina General Assembly			
52	52nd South Carolina General Assembly			
53	53rd South Carolina General Assembly			
54	54th South Carolina General Assembly			
55	55th South Carolina General Assembly			
56	56th South Carolina General Assembly			
57	57th South Carolina General Assembly			
58	58th South Carolina General Assembly			
59?			ca.1890	
South Carolina Constitution of 1895 (Note: The South Carolina Constitution of 1895, Article III, specifies election in November of House members every two years, and Senators every four years. Annual sessions begin in January.)
63?		January 1897		November 1896
64	64th South Carolina General Assembly			
65	65th South Carolina General Assembly			
66	66th South Carolina General Assembly			
67	67th South Carolina General Assembly			
68	68th South Carolina General Assembly			
69	69th South Carolina General Assembly			
70	70th South Carolina General Assembly			
71	71st South Carolina General Assembly		1916	
72	72nd South Carolina General Assembly	1917		1916
73	73rd South Carolina General Assembly	1919		1918
74	74th South Carolina General Assembly	1921		1920
75	75th South Carolina General Assembly	1923		1922
76	76th South Carolina General Assembly	1925		1924
77	77th South Carolina General Assembly	1927		1926
78	78th South Carolina General Assembly	1929		1928
79	79th South Carolina General Assembly	1931		1930
80	80th South Carolina General Assembly	1933		1932
81	81st South Carolina General Assembly	1935		1934
82	82nd South Carolina General Assembly	1937		1936
83	83rd South Carolina General Assembly	1939		1938
84	84th South Carolina General Assembly	1941		1940
85	85th South Carolina General Assembly	1943		1942
86	86th South Carolina General Assembly	1945		1944
87	87th South Carolina General Assembly	1947		1946
88	88th South Carolina General Assembly	1949		1948
89	89th South Carolina General Assembly	1951		1950
90	90th South Carolina General Assembly	1953		1952
91	91st South Carolina General Assembly	1955		1954
92	92nd South Carolina General Assembly	1957		1956
93	93rd South Carolina General Assembly	1959		1958
94	94th South Carolina General Assembly	1961		1960
95	95th South Carolina General Assembly	1963		1962
96	96th South Carolina General Assembly	1965		1964
97	97th South Carolina General Assembly	1967		1966
98	98th South Carolina General Assembly	1969		1968
99	99th South Carolina General Assembly	1971		1970
100	100th South Carolina General Assembly	1973		1972
101	101st South Carolina General Assembly	1975		1974
102	102nd South Carolina General Assembly	1977		1976
103	103rd South Carolina General Assembly	1979		1978
104	104th South Carolina General Assembly	1981		1980
105	105th South Carolina General Assembly	1983		1982
106	106th South Carolina General Assembly	1985		1984
107	107th South Carolina General Assembly	1987		1986
108	108th South Carolina General Assembly	1989		1988
109	109th South Carolina General Assembly	1991		1990
110	110th South Carolina General Assembly	1993		1992
111	111th South Carolina General Assembly	1995		1994
112	112th South Carolina General Assembly	1997	1998	1996
113	113th South Carolina General Assembly	1999		1998
114	114th South Carolina General Assembly	2001		2000
115	115th South Carolina General Assembly	2003		2002
116	116th South Carolina General Assembly	2005		2004
117	117th South Carolina General Assembly	2007		2006
118	118th South Carolina General Assembly	2009		November 2008: Senate
119	119th South Carolina General Assembly	2011		2010
120	120th South Carolina General Assembly	2013		November 2012: Senate
121	121st South Carolina General Assembly	2015		2014
122	122nd South Carolina General Assembly	2017		November 2016: House, Senate
123	123rd South Carolina General Assembly	2019		November 2018: House
124	124th South Carolina General Assembly	2021		November 2020: House, Senate
125	125th South Carolina General Assembly	2023		November 2022: House
126	126th South Carolina General Assembly	2025		November 5, 2024: House, Senate

== See also ==
- List of speakers of the South Carolina House of Representatives
- List of presidents of the South Carolina Senate
- List of governors of South Carolina
- Politics of South Carolina
- Elections in South Carolina
- South Carolina State Capitol
- Historical outline of South Carolina
- Lists of United States state legislative sessions
