= Alexander Macaulay =

American politician (born 1942)

Alexander Stephens Macaulay

Member of the South Carolina Senate from the 1st district
- In office 1981–1993
- Preceded by: Herbert D. Morgan
- Succeeded by: Thomas C. Alexander

Personal details
- Born: January 31, 1942 (age 84) Fort Moultrie, Sullivans Island, South Carolina, U.S.
- Party: Democratic
- Spouse: Maria Locke Boineau
- Children: Maria Locke, Alexander Stephens Jr.
- Education: The Citadel; University of South Carolina
- Occupation: Attorney

Alexander Stephens Macaulay (born January 31, 1942) is a former South Carolina state senator, representing the 1st district which includes Oconee and Pickens counties. He is a member of the Democratic Party.

== Personal life and education ==
Macaulay was born on January 31, 1942, at Fort Moultrie on Sullivans Island, South Carolina. He graduated from The Citadel with a B.A. in 1963 and earned a J.D. from the University of South Carolina in 1970. He is married to Maria Locke Boineau, and they have two children, Maria Locke and Alexander Stephens Jr. They reside in West Union, South Carolina.

== Career ==
=== Legal career ===
Macaulay served as both a prosecutor and public defender for Oconee County. He was elected to the South Carolina Senate in 1981 and served until 1993. He served on the South Carolina State Board of Education (1979–80), and the boards of directors for the United Way of Oconee County, Clemson University, and the Medical University of South Carolina. He was also president of the Oconee County Bar Association in 1980 and a past president of the Walhalla Rotary Club.

=== Judicial career ===
In 1994, Macaulay was elected to the judicial bench for the 10th Circuit, which includes Anderson and Oconee counties. He served as a judge until 2014 when he stepped down from full-time judicial service due to South Carolina's mandatory retirement age for judges. However, he continues to serve as an "active retired" judge, presiding over cases occasionally. In 2017, a portrait of Macaulay was unveiled in a fourth-floor courtroom at the Anderson County Courthouse to honor his contributions to the legal community.

In 2011, Macaulay authored a book titled Marching in Step: Masculinity, Citizenship, and The Citadel in Post-World War II America.

== Military service ==
Macaulay is a Vietnam War veteran, having served as an intelligence officer and advisor with the Military Assistance Command, Vietnam (MACV) in 1966. He served with the 2nd Battalion, 5th Cavalry, 1st Air Cavalry Division in 1967, where he was awarded the Combat Medic's Badge, Bronze Star, and Air Medal. He held the rank of Captain in the United States Army Reserve from 1968 to 1975.

== Publications ==
- Macaulay, Alexander. Marching in Step: Masculinity, Citizenship, and The Citadel in Post-World War II America. University of Georgia Press, 2011. ISBN 978-0820338217.

South Carolina Senate
Preceded by Herbert D. Morgan	Member of the South Carolina Senate from the 1st district 1981–1993	Succeeded by Thomas C. Alexander
