= Cassatt, South Carolina =

- Unincorporated community
- Location within South Carolina Location within the United States
- Coordinates: 34°21′53″N 80°26′09″W
- Country: United States
- State: South Carolina
- County: Kershaw
- Elevation: 390 ft (120 m)
- Time zone: UTC-5 (Eastern (EST))
  - Summer (DST): UTC-4 (EDT)
- ZIP code: 29032
- Area codes: 803, 839
- GNIS feature ID: 1231142

Cassatt is an unincorporated community in Kershaw County, South Carolina, United States. Its ZIP code is 29032. The community is located 13 miles north of Camden, on US Route 1. Cassatt was named after railroad executive Alexander Cassatt.

== Notable person ==
- South Carolina state legislator Dick Elliott was born in Cassatt.

•Trell Thomas founder and CEO of the impactful series The Black Excellence Brunch.
