= Nikki G. Setzler =

American politician (born 1945)

Nikki Setzler

Minority Leader of the South Carolina Senate
- In office November 12, 2012 – November 17, 2020
- Preceded by: John C. Land III
- Succeeded by: Brad Hutto

Member of the South Carolina Senate from the 26th district
- In office January 8, 1985 – November 5, 2024
- Preceded by: Constituency established
- Succeeded by: Russell Ott

Member of the South Carolina Senate from the 8th district
- In office January 11, 1977 – January 8, 1985
- Preceded by: Albert Dooley; Michael Laughlin; Jimmy Martin
- Succeeded by: David Lloyd Thomas

Personal details
- Born: August 7, 1945 (age 80) Asheville, North Carolina, U.S.
- Party: Democratic
- Spouse: Ada Taylor (m. 1969)
- Children: 4
- Education: University of South Carolina (BA, JD)
- Profession: Attorney, politician

Nikki G. Setzler (born August 7, 1945) is an American politician who was a Democratic member of the South Carolina Senate, representing the 26th District since 1976. In November 2020, Setzler announced that he would step down as Minority Leader.

After the resignation of North Dakota's Ray Holmberg on June 1, 2022, Setzler became the country's longest serving incumbent state senator. For much of his tenure, Setzler was the only elected Democrat representing a portion of Lexington County above the county level.

== Political career ==
=== S.C. Senate ===
==== Elections ====
===== 2016 election =====
Nikki Setzler defeated Republican challenger Brad Lindsey in 2016, receiving about 58% of the vote.

===== 2020 election =====
In 2020, Setzler defeated Republican challenger Chris Smith, winning roughly 54% of the vote.

===== 2024 election =====
On January 10, 2024, Setzler announced his retirement from public office and would not stand for re-election in the 2024 South Carolina Senate election. In the race to succeed Setzler, State Representative Russell Ott defeated State Senator Dick Harpootlian for the Democratic nomination while Jason Guerry defeated Chris Smith for the Republican nomination. Ott faced Guerry in the general election with Ott winning the Senate seat.

== Legacy ==
On January 22, 2025, a portrait of Setzler was unveiled and later hung in the State Senate chambers, marking his 48 years as a Senator, the longest service in the nation. The portrait commissioned in a Senate resolution passed in March 2024. Speakers at the unveiling ceremony included State Senators Thomas C. Alexander, Harvey S. Peeler, Jr.; Darrell Jackson, A. Shane Massey, Brad Hutto, Vincent Sheheen and John C. Land III.

South Carolina Senate
| Preceded by Albert John Dooley; Michael Lukens Laughlin; Jimmy Leawood Martin | Member of the South Carolina Senate from the 8th district 1977–1985 | Succeeded by David Lloyd Thomas |
| Preceded by Constituency established | Member of the South Carolina Senate from the 26th district 1985–present | Incumbent |
| Preceded by John C. Land III | Minority Leader of the South Carolina Senate; 2012–2020 | Succeeded by Brad Hutto |
