= President of the South Carolina Senate =

Legislative presiding officer

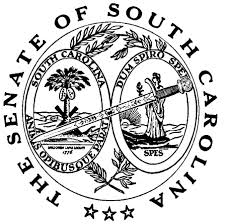
- Incumbent; Thomas C. Alexander since December 6, 2021
- Member of: South Carolina Senate
- Nominator: Election by senate
- Term length: 4 years
- Inaugural holder: Henry Laurens (as president of the Provincial Congress)
- Formation: 1776
- Succession: Second
- Salary: $33,400 + $140 per diem

The president of the South Carolina Senate is the presiding officer of the body. The role of the president is to ensure that general order is maintained in the senate by recognizing members to speak, ensuring members are following established rules, and to call for votes. Additionally, the president is second in the line of succession should the governor and lieutenant governor be unable to serve as governor. The current president of the senate is Thomas C. Alexander, a Republican, who has held the position since December 6, 2021.

== History ==
Henry Laurens was the first president of the senate (as president of the Provincial Congress) beginning with South Carolina's independence from the Kingdom of Great Britain in 1776. Until 1865, the president of the senate was chosen by the legislature. From 1865 to 2019, the position of president of the senate was held by the lieutenant governor, who was elected at-large by the population of the state. In a 2016 referendum, voters decided to separate the offices of lieutenant governor and president of the senate. Beginning in 2019, the lieutenant governor is selected by the governor and the president of the senate is selected by senators. Kevin L. Bryant was the last lieutenant governor to serve as president of the senate. The current president is Thomas C. Alexander, who succeeded Harvey Peeler after his resignation in December 2021.

== Election ==
The president of the South Carolina Senate is elected to a term of four years by a simple majority vote by the members of the senate. The next election will be held in January 2025. Any senator may be elected president, except those serving as majority or minority leaders. The president is usually a member of the majority party. One exception is when Democrat Yancey McGill was elected president of the senate in 2015 by the Republican-controlled senate.

== Roles and responsibilities ==
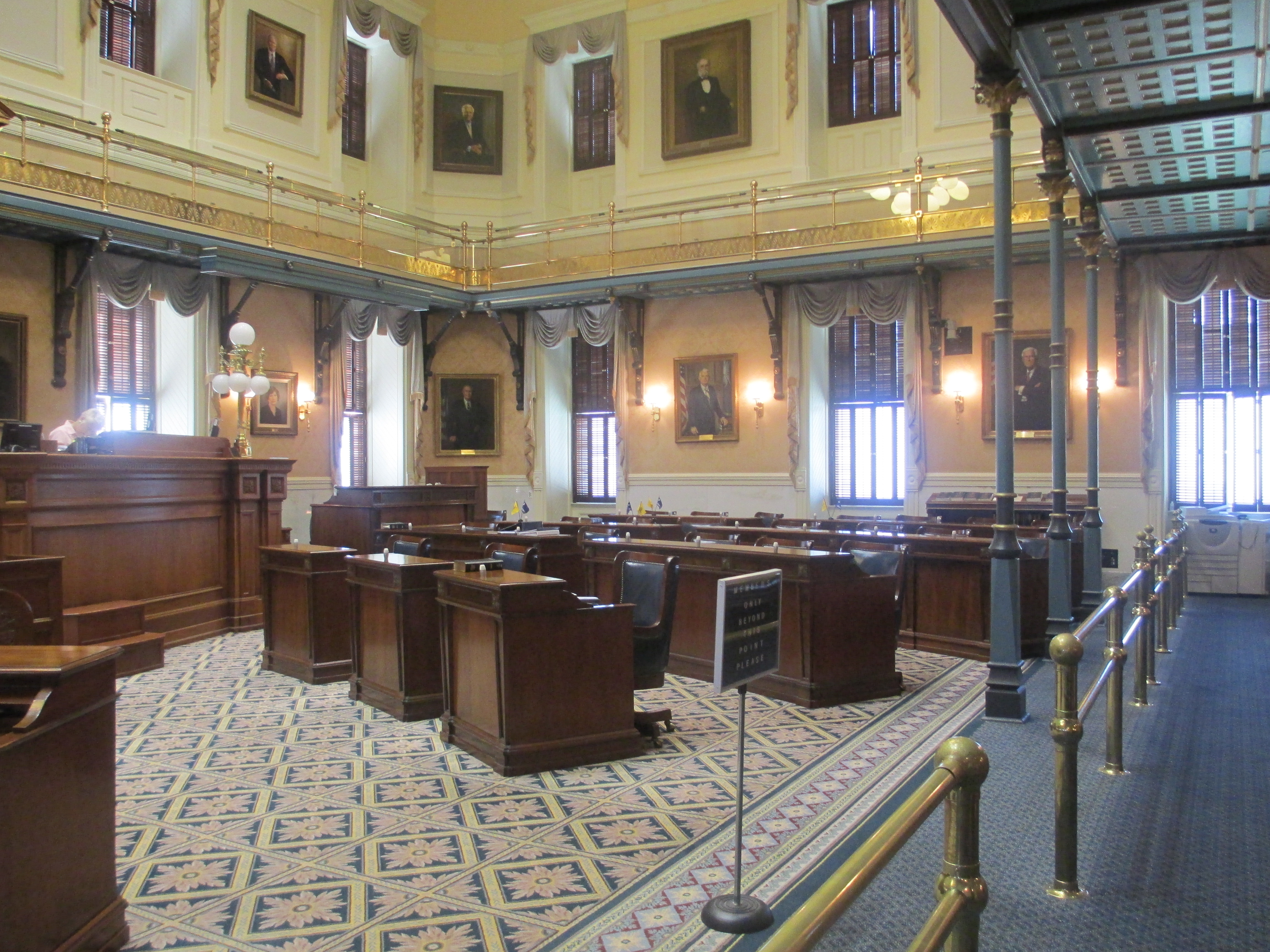
The senate chamber

The president of the senate generally oversees the proceeding of the legislative body by recognizing senators to speak, calling for votes, and maintaining general order. The president is automatically the chairman of the committee on legislative oversight and is seated on the operations and management committee, but is prohibited from chairing any other committee. Additionally, the president of the senate has the ability to do the following:

- Call for a special election after an inter-term vacancy in the senate
- Adjourn the senate without a vote in cases of emergency
- Should the senate be equally divided in vote, the president's vote will decide the majority
- Seat six of the thirteen members to sit on the committee of ethics
- Seat four members to sit on the operations and management committee, two of whom must be from the minority party
- Seat two members and the chairman to sit on the committees of conference and free conference
- Suspend a senator from office who pleads guilty or is found guilty of a felony or other indictment (Note: The Senate Ethics Committee will vote to expel the member)

=== Succession to governorship ===
The president of the senate is second in the gubernatorial line of succession. If the lieutenant governor is unable to serve as governor, the president of the senate becomes governor. Since the role of lieutenant governor was separated from president of the senate, no president has succeeded to the office of governor.

== List of presidents ==
List of presidents of the South Carolina Senate (Note: Since 2019 constitutional amendment)
#	President	Party	Term of office
Lieutenant Governor prior to January 8, 2019.
1	Harvey S. Peeler Jr.	Republican	January 8, 2019 - December 6, 2021
2	Thomas C. Alexander	Republican	December 6, 2021 - Incumbent

== See also ==
- List of lieutenant governors of South Carolina
- Governor of South Carolina
- List of South Carolina state legislatures
