= Ronnie Cromer =

American politician

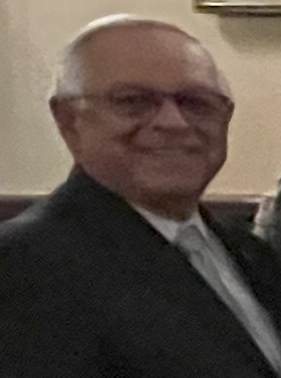
- Cromer in 2023

Member of the South Carolina Senate from the 18th district
- Incumbent
- Assumed office 2003
- Preceded by: André Bauer

Personal details
- Born: December 1, 1947 (age 78) Newberry, South Carolina
- Party: Republican
- Spouse: Linda Epting (m. 1969)
- Children: 2
- Education: University of South Carolina (B.A.)
- Profession: Pharmacist, politician

Ronnie W. Cromer (born December 1, 1947) is an American politician. He has represented South Carolina Senate District 18 (Lexington, Newberry, and Union counties) since 2003. He is a member of the Republican Party.

== Political career ==
=== Prosperity Town Council ===
Cromer served on the Prosperity Town Council for seven years (1973-1980).

=== S.C. Senate ===
==== Elections ====
Cromer is a Republican member of the South Carolina Senate, representing the 18th District since 2003, when he won a special election against Jim Lander to fill the remainder of the term of André Bauer.

- 2008 South Carolina Senate election
- 2012 South Carolina Senate election
- 2016 South Carolina Senate election: In 2016, Cromer ran uncontested.
- 2020 South Carolina Senate election: In 2020, Cromer defeated Republican primary challenger Charles Bumgardner. He defeated Democrat Christopher Thibault in the general election.
- 2024 South Carolina Senate election: In 2024, Cromer will run uncontested.

==== Tenure ====
Cromer chairs the Senate Banking and Insurance Committee, and serves on the Senate Finance, and Fish Game and Forestry Committees.

=== Endorsements ===
In June 2023, Cromer endorsed Tim Scott in the 2024 United States presidential election.

South Carolina Senate
Preceded by André Bauer	Member of the South Carolina Senate from the 18th district 2003–present	Incumbent
