= Creighton B. Coleman =

American politician

Member of the South Carolina Senate from the 17th district
- In office 2008 – November 14, 2016
- Preceded by: Linda H. Short
- Succeeded by: Mike Fanning

Member of the South Carolina House of Representatives from the 41st district
- In office 2000–2008
- Preceded by: Timothy Castles Wilkes
- Succeeded by: Boyd Brown

Personal details
- Born: May 12, 1956 (age 70) Winnsboro, South Carolina, United States
- Party: Democratic
- Spouse: Marian McNair (m. 1990)
- Children: 3
- Education: The Citadel (B.A.); University of South Carolina (J.D.)
- Profession: Attorney

Creighton B. Coleman (born May 12, 1956) is an American attorney and politician. He is a former member of the South Carolina Senate from the 17th District, serving from 2018 to 2016, and the South Carolina House of Representatives from the 41st district, serving from 2000 to 2008. He is a member of the Democratic party, and served as the chair of the Fairfield County Democratic Party in 1998.
