= Bill Mescher =

American politician (1927–2007)

Member of the South Carolina Senate from the 44th district
- In office 1992 – April 8, 2007
- Preceded by: Sherry Shealy Martschink
- Succeeded by: Paul G. Campbell Jr.

Personal details
- Born: William Clarence Mescher; September 5, 1927 Belknap, Illinois
- Died: April 8, 2007 (aged 79)
- Party: Republican
- Children: 1
- Education: University of Illinois (B.S.E.E.); Northwestern University (M.B.A.)

Military service
- Allegiance: United States
- Branch/service: United States Army
- Rank: Staff sergeant
- Battles/wars: World War II, Korean War

William Clarence "Bill" Mescher (September 5, 1927 – April 8, 2007) was a Republican politician from South Carolina. He was born in Belknap, Illinois. Mescher served in the South Carolina Senate, representing Senate district 44 Berkeley County, SC, from 1992 until his death in 2007.

== Biography ==
Mescher was the son of Clarence H. Mescher, a sharecropper, and Jane (Richards) Mescher.

He was the first in his family to graduate from high school and then benefitted from the GI Bill to go to college, having served as a US Army Staff Sergeant in World War II and Korea. He gained a B.S.E.E. from the University of Illinois, and later an M.B.A. from Northwestern University.

Mescher went on to become chief executive of utilities company Santee Corp., and headed his own management consultancy practice.

He was married twice. In 1948, he married Shirley Sisson; they had a daughter, Barbara Micheau, and a grandson, Walker Lee Dear. Shirley's death from lung cancer inspired Senator Mescher's campaign to legalise medical marijuana.

After Shirley's death, he remarried in 1986 to (Sallie) Kitty Stanley; She had three children from her first marriage: Kathy Johnson, Reed Tanner, and Karen Tanner. The family lived in Pinopolis.

== State senator ==
Mescher, a conservative Republican, was first elected as a state senator in 1992. He was re-elected in 1996 and then won a special election in 1997.

In 2005, Mescher criticized Governor Mark Sanford for his involvement in Santee Cooper affairs. Sanford responded by pointing out a conflict of interest, that Mescher himself once served as CEO of Santee Cooper.

In 2007, Mescher gained media attention when he proposed a bill to legalize medical marijuana in South Carolina. He has also previously fought for the legalization of ferrets as pets and tattooing in the state.

Mescher died of a stroke on April 8, 2007. A Special Election for State Senate District 44 was held on August 7, 2007.
