= Randy Scott (politician) =

American politician

Member of the South Carolina Senate from the 38th district
- In office 2004–2008
- Preceded by: William "Bill" Branton, Jr.
- Succeeded by: Michael T. "Mike" Rose

Personal details
- Born: March 16, 1946 Summerville, South Carolina
- Died: December 5, 2015 (aged 69) Summerville, South Carolina
- Party: Republican
- Spouse: Amanda
- Profession: Small business owner

Randy Scott (1946-2015) was a Republican member of the South Carolina Senate, representing the 38th District from 2004 to 2008. He died in December 2015.
