= Harvey S. Peeler Jr. =

American politician from South Carolina

Harvey Peeler
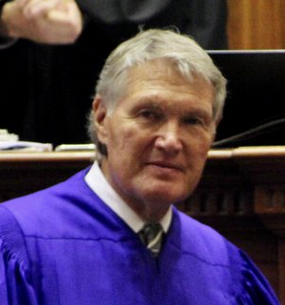

President of the South Carolina Senate
- In office January 8, 2019 – December 6, 2021
- Preceded by: Kevin L. Bryant (Lieutenant Governor); Hugh Leatherman (President pro tempore)
- Succeeded by: Thomas C. Alexander

Majority Leader of the South Carolina Senate
- In office August 1, 2005 – April 6, 2016
- Preceded by: Hugh Leatherman
- Succeeded by: A. Shane Massey

Member of the South Carolina Senate
- Incumbent
- Assumed office January 8, 1985
- Preceded by: Rembert Dennis
- Constituency: 14th district
- In office January 14, 1981 – January 8, 1985 Serving with Robert Lake
- Preceded by: John Long
- Succeeded by: Jefferson Smith
- Constituency: 5th district

Personal details
- Born: September 8, 1948 (age 77) Gaffney, South Carolina, U.S.
- Party: Democratic (before 1989); Republican (1989–present)
- Spouse: Ila Caudill
- Relatives: Bob Peeler (brother)
- Education: Clemson University (BS)

Harvey Smith Peeler Jr. (born September 8, 1948) is an American politician. He is a member of the South Carolina Senate, representing the 14th District since the 1980s, initially as a Democrat, and from October 1989, as a Republican. He was the Senate Majority Leader from 2005 to 2016 and President of the Senate from 2019 to 2021. In 2021, he became Chair of the Finance Committee after the death of Hugh Leatherman.

== S.C. Senate ==
Peeler has served as a state senator for South Carolina since 1981. He became Senate Majority Leader in 2005 after the resignation of Hugh Leatherman. He resigned as Majority Leader in 2016, passing the position to A. Shane Massey.

In Peeler's first year in the state senate, he formed a voting bloc with Hugh Leatherman. In 1989, he was one of five Democratic South Carolina legislators to switch to the Republican Party from the Democratic.

He has previously chaired the Senate Medical Affairs Committee, and served as vice-chairman of the Senate Finance Committee since 2007. Peeler currently serves on the Senate Ethics, Interstate Cooperation, Medical Affairs and Transportation Committees.

== Controversies ==
=== Confederate flag ===
In 2015, after the shooting at the Emanuel African Methodist Episcopal Church in Charleston, which killed fellow State Senator Clementa C. Pinckney, Peeler voted against removing the Confederate flag. Peeler compared removing it to "removing a tattoo from the corpse of a loved one and thinking that that would change the loved one's obituary." He was one of only three state senators to vote against its removal, the other two being Danny Verdin and Lee Bright. Fifteen years earlier, Peeler was one of only seven senators who voted against the flag's removal from the top of the South Carolina Capitol Dome and both chambers of the South Carolina Legislature to its present position on the capitol grounds, arguing that the flag's removal would only worsen race relations. The 2000 vote was a compromise between anti- and pro-flag forces in the wake of an economic boycott of the state.

== Personal life ==
Peeler was born on September 8, 1948, in Gaffney, South Carolina. He received a Bachelor of Science from Clemson University in 1970. He served as a lieutenant in the United States Army from 1970 to 1972. He is a dairyman.

Peeler married Ila LaDonna Caudill on August 8, 1969, and they have three children: Brantlee Rene, Harvey Smith III, and Boone Solomon. He is the brother of former South Carolina Lieutenant Governor Bob Peeler. Peeler attends Gaffney First Baptist Church. He is a Mason and a Shriner. He is a member of the American Jersey Cattle Association and the American Legion.

== Electoral history ==
Year	Office	Type	Party	Main opponent	Party	Votes for Peeler				Result	Swing	Ref.
Year	Office	Type	Party	Main opponent	Party	Total	%	P.	±%	Result	Swing	Ref.
1980	S.C. Senator	General	Democratic	Write-in	N/A	33,268	99.97%	1st	N/A	Won	Hold	
1984	S.C. Senator	General	Democratic	James Y. Sparks	Republican	14,558	73.09%	1st	−26.88%	Won	Hold	
1988	S.C. Senator	General	Democratic	Write-in	N/A	14,685	96.76%	1st	+23.67%	Won	Hold	
1992	S.C. Senator	General	Republican	Larry Sossamon	Democratic	13,292	51.53%	1st	−45.23%	Won	Hold (Note: Peeler switched parties in 1989.)	(Note: Note that the numbers in the table for State Senate District 14 incorrectly list the U.S. House votes for Cherokee County. Additionally, the Union County votes are also incorrect when compared with the County-specific record. Adjusting for these errors in the aggregate table gives the correct vote total and result, whereas the table as recorded suggests Sossamon won.)
1996	S.C. Senator	General	Republican	Henry L. Jolly	Democratic	15,612	61.92%	1st	+10.39%	Won	Hold	
2000	S.C. Senator	General	Republican	Write-in	N/A	21,739	99.76%	1st	+37.84%	Won	Hold	
2004	S.C. Senator	General	Republican	Rick Dizbon	Democratic	22,957	69.48%	1st	−30.28%	Won	Hold	
2008	S.C. Senator	General	Republican	Write-in	N/A	29,179	99.22%	1st	+29.74%	Won	Hold	
2012	S.C. Senator	General	Republican	Write-in	N/A	31,620	99.13%	1st	−0.09%	Won	Hold	
2016	S.C. Senator	Rep. primary	Republican	Kenny Price	Republican	5,196	82.87%	1st	N/A	Won	N/A	
2016	S.C. Senator	General	Republican	Write-in	N/A	36,427	99.09%	1st	−0.04%	Won	Hold	
2020	S.C. Senator	General	Republican	Sarah Work	Alliance	42,377	83.86%	1st	−15.23%	Won	Hold	

== Notes ==
South Carolina Senate
Preceded by John Long	Member of the South Carolina Senate from the 5th district 1981–1985; Served alongside: Robert Lake	Succeeded by Jefferson Smith
Preceded by Rembert Dennis	Member of the South Carolina Senate from the 14th district 1985–present	Incumbent
South Carolina Senate
Preceded by Hugh Leatherman	Majority Leader of the South Carolina Senate; 2005–2016	Succeeded by A. Shane Massey
Political offices
Preceded by Kevin L. Bryant as Lieutenant Governor of South Carolina	President of the South Carolina Senate; 2019–2021	Succeeded by Thomas C. Alexander
Preceded by Hugh Leatherman as President pro tempore of the South Carolina Senate	President of the South Carolina Senate; 2019–2021	Succeeded by Thomas C. Alexander
