= Robert W. Hayes Jr. =

American politician

Robert W. 'Wes' Hayes Jr.

Member of the South Carolina Senate from the 15th district
- In office 1991–2017
- Preceded by: James Madison Waddell, Jr.
- Succeeded by: Wes Climer

Member of the South Carolina House of Representatives from the 46th district
- In office 1985–1991
- Preceded by: John Calvin Hayes III
- Succeeded by: Gary Simrill

Personal details
- Born: December 19, 1952 (age 73) Spartanburg, South Carolina, U.S.
- Party: Republican
- Spouse: Sarah Mellon Shurley
- Profession: Attorney

Robert W. 'Wes' Hayes Jr. (born December 19, 1952) is a Republican member of the South Carolina Senate, who had represented the 15th district since 1991 until 2017. He was a member of the South Carolina House of Representatives from 1985 through 1991.
