= Raymond Cleary =

American politician

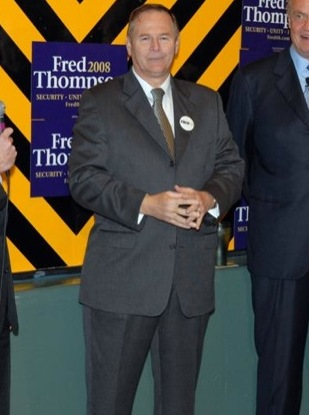

Member of the South Carolina Senate from the 34th district
- In office 2004 - 2017
- Preceded by: Arthur Ravenel Jr.
- Succeeded by: Stephen L. Goldfinch

Personal details
- Born: August 13, 1948 (age 77) Lincoln County, North Carolina
- Party: Republican
- Spouse: Lisa
- Profession: Dentist

Raymond E. Cleary III (born August 13, 1948) is a former Republican member of the South Carolina Senate, who represented the 34th District from 2004 until 2017.
