= Linda H. Short =

American politician

Member of the South Carolina Senate from the 17th district
- In office 1992–2007
- Preceded by: John Alfred Martin
- Succeeded by: Creighton B. Coleman

Personal details
- Born: July 9, 1947 (age 79) Gastonia, North Carolina
- Party: Democratic
- Spouse: Paul

Linda H. Short is a retired politician who was a Democratic member of the South Carolina Senate, representing the 17th District from 1992 to 2008.

At one point, Short was the only woman serving in the South Carolina Senate.
