= Kent M. Williams =

American politician

Member of the South Carolina Senate from the 30th district
- Incumbent
- Assumed office 2004
- Preceded by: Maggie Wallace Glover

Chairman of Marion County Board of Education
- In office 1998–2004

Personal details
- Born: September 15, 1960 (age 65) Marion, South Carolina
- Party: Democratic
- Education: Florence–Darlington Technical College (AS); South Carolina State University (BS)

Kent M. Williams (born September 15, 1960) is a Democratic member of the South Carolina Senate, representing the 30th District (Dillon, Florence, Horry, Marion, and Marlboro Counties) since 2004.

== Political career ==
=== S.C. Senate ===
==== Elections ====
===== 2016 election =====
Williams defeated Patrick Richardson in the Democratic primary, and went on to win the uncontested general election in 2016.

===== 2020 election =====
In 2020, Williams defeated Patrick Richardson in the Democratic primary, and was reelected to the District 30 seat.

===== 2024 election =====
In 2024, Republican Mayor of Marion Rodney Berry unsuccessfully challenged Williams for his Senate seat.

South Carolina Senate
Preceded by Maggie Wallace Glover	Member of the South Carolina Senate from the 30th district 2004–present	Incumbent
