= Luke A. Rankin =

American politician

Member of the South Carolina Senate from the 33rd district
- Incumbent
- Assumed office 1993
- Preceded by: Jefferson M. Long Jr.

Personal details
- Born: April 9, 1962 (age 64) Horry County, South Carolina
- Party: Republican (since 2004) Democrat (until 2004)
- Spouse: Lindsey (Bonds) Rankin
- Education: University of South Carolina (BA, JD)
- Profession: Attorney

Luke A. Rankin (born April 9, 1962, in Horry County, South Carolina) is an American attorney and politician serving as a member of the South Carolina State Senate. A Republican, he represents District 33 (Horry County). He assumed office in November 1992 and continues to serve in the Senate as of 2025.

Rankin chairs the Senate Judiciary Committee, and serves on the Senate Banking and Insurance, Education, Ethics, and Transportation Committees. In 2021, he served as Chairman of the Senate Judiciary Redistricting Committee.

== Early life and education ==
Rankin was born to O. A. Rankin and Dorothy S. Rankin in Horry County, South Carolina. He earned a Bachelor of Arts degree in 1984 and a Juris Doctor degree in 1987, both from the University of South Carolina.

== Legal career ==
Luke Rankin practices law and is associated with the firm Rankin & Rankin.

=== Tenure ===
Rankin has represented District 33 in the South Carolina State Senate since his first election in 1992.

=== Committee assignments ===
As of the 2023–2024 legislative session, Rankin holds the following committee roles:

- Chairman, Senate Judiciary Committee
- Member of the Banking and Insurance Committee
- Member of the Education Committee
- Member of the Ethics Committee
- Member of the Interstate Cooperation Committee
- Member of the Transportation Committee

== Personal life ==
Rankin married Lindsey Bonds on May 28, 2011, at DeBordieu Colony in Georgetown, South Carolina. He and Lindsey have two children, Luke Jr. and Hollings.
