= Thomas C. Alexander =

American politician

Thomas Alexander
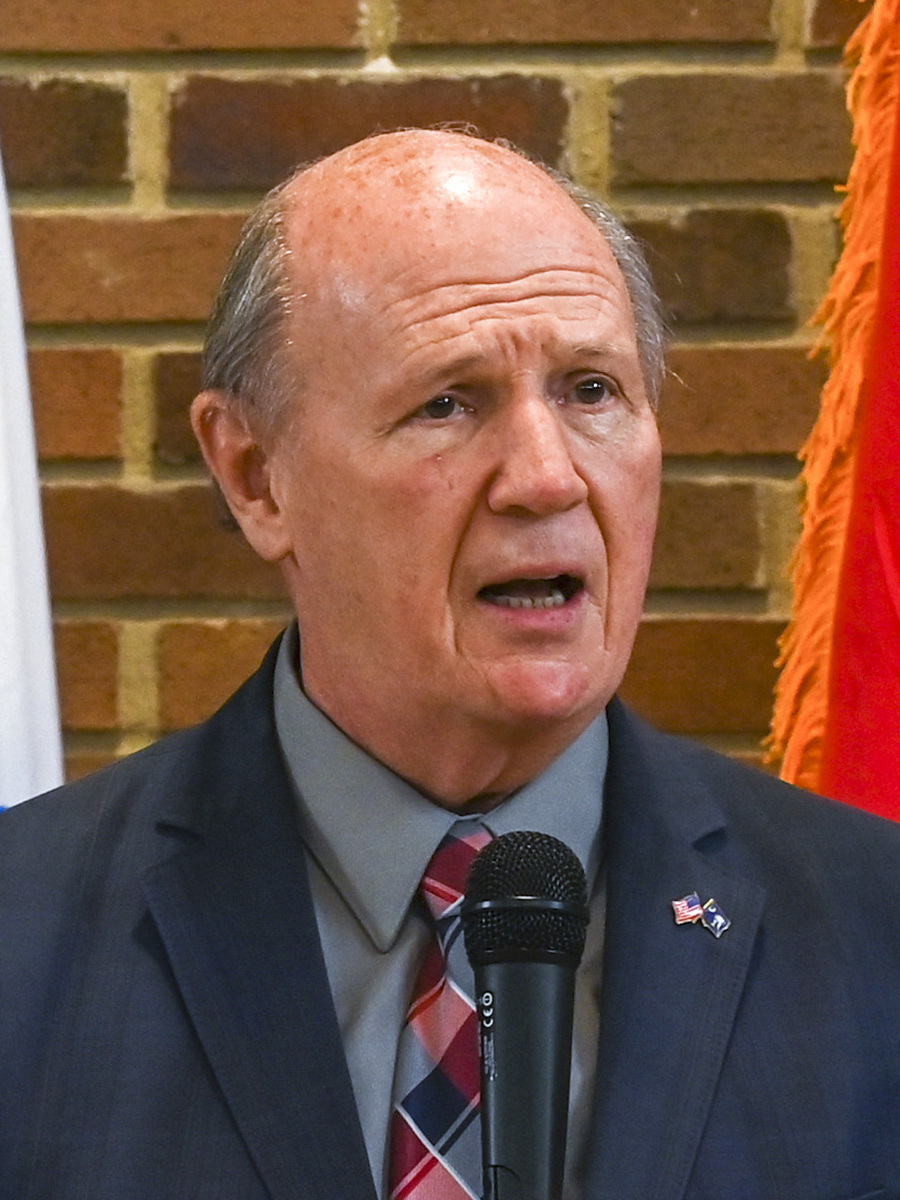

2nd President of the South Carolina Senate
- Incumbent
- Assumed office December 6, 2021
- Preceded by: Harvey S. Peeler Jr.

Member of the South Carolina Senate from the 1st district
- Incumbent
- Assumed office 1994
- Preceded by: Alexander Macaulay

Member of the South Carolina House of Representatives from the 1st district
- In office 1987–1994
- Preceded by: Marshall Cleveland
- Succeeded by: Bradley Cain

Personal details
- Born: July 25, 1956 (age 70) Seneca, South Carolina, U.S.
- Party: Democratic (before 1996); Republican (1996–present)
- Spouse: Lynda Gibson
- Children: 3
- Education: Anderson University (AA); Clemson University (BS)

Thomas C. Alexander (born July 25, 1956) is an American businessman and politician. Since 2021, he has served as the second President of the South Carolina Senate. A member of the Republican Party, he has represented South Carolina's 1st Senate District since 1994 and has represented parts of Oconee County, specifically the city of Walhalla, for over forty years.

== Early life and political career ==
Thomas Alexander was born in Seneca, South Carolina, on July 25, 1956. He earned an associate degree from Anderson University in 1976 and a bachelor's degree in economics from Clemson University in 1978. In 2014, the Clemson Alumni Association awarded him the Distinguished Service Award for his public service.

=== Walhalla City Council ===
Alexander began his political career on the Walhalla City Council in 1982, following his father, Claude Alexander, who had also served on the council. He was elected Mayor Pro Tempore in 1985.

== S.C. House of Representatives ==
Alexander was elected to the South Carolina House of Representatives as a Democrat in 1986, defeating incumbent Marshall Duke Cleveland to represent House District 1, encompassing Oconee and Pickens Counties. He served until 1994 and was Chairman of the House Committee on Labor, Commerce, and Industry from 1992 to 1993.

In 1991, South Carolina's 'mandate-to-write' auto-insurance law faced criticism due to rising costs. Alexander, who chaired House committees on insurance, advocated for a new car insurance system. Despite extensive government discussions, the issue remained unresolved by 1993.

In 1992, he voted to extend the operational period of a nuclear waste landfill in Barnwell County.

== S.C. Senate ==
Alexander was first elected to the South Carolina Senate to represent District 1 (Oconee and part of Pickens Counties) in a 1994 special election. This election was held to complete the term of Alexander Macaulay, who had been elected to the judicial bench for the 10th Circuit (Anderson and Oconee counties). At that time, Alexander was a conservative Democrat. However, prior to the 1996 election, he switched to the Republican Party, announcing the change when he filed for reelection in the Republican primary.

As of April 2024, Alexander chairs the Interstate Cooperation Committee and the Legislative Oversight Committee. He also serves on the Banking and Insurance Committee, the Ethics Committee, the Finance Committee, the Labor, Commerce and Industry Committee, and the Medical Affairs Committee. Previously, he chaired the Finance Committee and the Labor, Commerce and Industry Committee. Additionally, Alexander is the Vice-Chair of the College and University Trustee Screening Commission, a Joint Committee with members from both the House and Senate. On December 6, 2021, Alexander was sworn in as the 2nd President of the South Carolina Senate.

When the Upstate had an uptick in bear removal requests in 2001, Alexander proposed a bill that would legalize the shooting of bears that threaten "property, crops, people, or pets." He later acknowledged his bill to have been broader than necessary.

In 2002, Alexander sponsored a do-not-call law, but found the bill stalled by lobbying from banks, insurance companies, and credit card companies.

=== Drug legislation ===
Alexander has proposed legislation with harsher penalties for fentanyl dealers, and is against medical marijuana legislation.

=== Health ===
In 2008, Alexander sponsored legislation to raise the state tax on cigarettes from 45 to 57 cents to raise funds for programs to help curtail smoking and health insurance.

In 2023, Alexander was a vocal supporter of bipartisan efforts to address the rise in youth vaping in the state. He also helped pass a statewide plan to address Alzheimer's and dementia.

=== LGBT rights ===
In 2022, Alexander supported and voted for South Carolina's Save Women's Sports Act. The bill, signed into law on May 18, 2022, bars transgender students from participating in sports teams that do not match their gender assigned at birth.

On March 14, 2023, Alexander cosponsored a bill to ban gender-affirming care for minors alongside other Republican Senators. He voted in favor of a similar bill, H. 4624: Gender Reassignment Procedures, which became law on May 21, 2024.

=== Redistricting ===
Alexander was President of the South Carolina Senate during the United States Supreme Court case regarding racial and partisan gerrymandering, Alexander v. South Carolina State Conference of the NAACP. He oversaw the redistricting process (and is the Alexander named in the case title). On March 28, 2024, a three-judge district court issued an order allowing for the map to remain in place for the 2024 United States Elections. On May 23, 2024, the Supreme Court ruled in favor of the South Carolina legislature, arguing that the NAACP failed to provide substantiated evidence demonstrating race-based motivations in the districts drawn.

=== Reproductive rights ===
Alexander is pro-life. Throughout his career, he has supported the restriction of abortion in South Carolina. His preference has always been towards a total ban without any exceptions (such as for cases of incest or rape), preferring a law that is "as restrictive as possible." However, he has frequently been willing to compromise to get some ban passed. His time as President of the Senate has overseen the state's most restrictive abortion legislation, a six-week fetal heartbeat bill. The bill went into effect on August 23, 2023. This followed a decision by the South Carolina Supreme Court, which voted 4–1 to overturn its earlier ruling that had blocked the bill earlier that year. Alexander voted in favor of the legislation.

== Endorsements ==
=== Republican Party Presidential Nominee ===
- He endorsed John McCain instead of George Bush in the 2000 Republican Party presidential primaries.
- He endorsed Donald Trump in the 2024 Republican Party presidential primaries, declining to endorse previous SC Governor Nikki Haley.

== Controversies ==
=== Expense Reimbursement ===
Alexander had the highest total expense reimbursements among state lawmakers in the 2011-2012 fiscal year, totaling $17,613. He cited his longer commute and perfect attendance as reasons for the high total.

=== Comments on Parkland Shooting Survivors ===
In 2018, following derogatory comments and conspiracy theories posted by a committee staffer about survivors of the Marjory Stoneman Douglas High School shooting, South Carolina Democrats called for her dismissal as the research director for the state Senate Labor, Commerce, and Industry Committee. Despite receiving criticism from the public and pressure from Democratic leaders, Alexander, chairing the committee, chose not to terminate her employment. This decision drew criticism from Democrats and was defended by the Republican Party as a non-issue. Subsequently, in 2023, the South Carolina Senate recognized Widener with a commendation for her extensive service to the state.

=== Utility Company Influence ===
As the head of the Public Utilities Review Committee (PURC), Alexander has been associated with controversies involving utility companies. Reports have noted Alexander's presence at dinners and events sponsored by utility companies, including SCANA and Duke Power, raising concerns about the relationships between lawmakers and utility companies, particularly in light of the failed $9 billion V.C. Summer nuclear project. Furthermore, Alexander received $21,250 in political contributions from utilities between 2005 and 2017, according to reports. While Alexander has defended his participation and the committee's actions, stating no issues were discussed at dinners and expressing skepticism about the effectiveness of prohibiting donations, these incidents have fueled ongoing debates about regulatory oversight and potential conflicts of interest.

== Personal life ==
Alexander and his wife Lynda live in Walhalla, South Carolina. They have three children and 13 grandchildren. Alexander and his wife are Presbyterian, attending the historic church, the Walhalla Presbyterian Church.

Alexander owned an office supplies store, Alexander's Office Supply, until he sold it in 2022. New ownership changed its name to Alexander's Work & Wander. While owner of Alexander's Office Supply, he published several historical books written by Rev. George Shealy such as a book about the founder of Walhalla, Johann Andreas Wagener, and a book about the Mollohon Mill Village.

He is a member of the American Legislative Exchange Council (ALEC), a conservative lobbying group. He is the Vice Chairman of the Blue Ridge Bank.

== Electoral history ==
| Year | Office | Type | Party | Main opponent | Party | Votes for Alexander | | | | Result | Swing | Ref. |
| Year | Office | Type | Party | Main opponent | Party | Total | % | P. | ±% | Result | Swing | Ref. |
|---|---|---|---|---|---|---|---|---|---|---|---|---|
| 1986 | S.C. Representative | Dem. primary | Democratic | Marshall Duke Cleveland (Note: Incumbent seeking re-election.) | Democratic | 927 | 28.00% | 2nd | N/A | Runoff | N/A | |
| 1986 | S.C. Representative | Dem. primary runoff | Democratic | Marshall Duke Cleveland | Democratic | 1,656 | 52.92% | 1st | N/A | Won | Hold | |
| 1986 | S.C. Representative | General | Democratic | Write-in | N/A | 4,435 | 100.00% | 1st | N/A | Won | Hold | |
| 1988 | S.C. Representative | General | Democratic | Write-in | N/A | 5,637 | 100.00% | 1st | 0.00% | Won | Hold | |
| 1990 | S.C. Representative | General | Democratic | Write-in | N/A | 4,691 | 99.94% | 1st | -0.06% | Won | Hold | |
| 1992 | S.C. Representative | General | Democratic | Z. Tommy Abbott, Jr. | Republican | 6,266 | 62.41% | 1st | -37.53% | Won | Hold | |
| 1994 | S.C. Senator | Special | Democratic | Gresham Barrett | Republican | 11,881 | 65.93% | 1st | N/A | Won | Hold | |
| 1996 | S.C. Senator | Rep. primary | Republican | David Riggs | Republican | 6,915 | 87.23% | 1st | N/A | Won | N/A | |
| 1996 | S.C. Senator | General | Republican | Ted N. Phillips | Democratic | 18,136 | 74.97% | 1st | N/A | Won | Gain | |
| 2000 | S.C. Senator | General | Republican | Write-in | N/A | 21,380 | 99.87% | 1st | +24.90% | Won | Hold | |
| 2004 | S.C. Senator | General | Republican | Write-in | N/A | 25,848 | 99.58% | 1st | -0.30% | Won | Hold | |
| 2008 | S.C. Senator | General | Republican | Polly Nicolay | Constitution | 27,498 | 85.17% | 1st | -14.40% | Won | Hold | |
| 2012 | S.C. Senator | General | Republican | Write-in | N/A | 29,957 | 99.11% | 1st | +13.94% | Won | Hold | |
| 2016 | S.C. Senator | General | Republican | Write-in | N/A | 33,175 | 99.06% | 1st | -0.05% | Won | Hold | |
| 2020 | S.C. Senator | General | Republican | Write-in | N/A | 39,794 | 98.02% | 1st | -1.04% | Won | Hold | |

== Notes ==
Political offices
| Preceded by Harvey S. Peeler Jr. | President of the South Carolina Senate; 2021–present | Incumbent |
