= William H. O'Dell =

American politician

Billy O'Dell

Member of the South Carolina Senate from the 4th district
- In office December 6, 1988 – January 7, 2016
- Preceded by: Charles Lewis Powell
- Succeeded by: Michael Gambrell

Personal details
- Born: William Hamilton O'Dell; October 11, 1938 Ware Shoals, South Carolina
- Died: January 7, 2016 (aged 77) Greenwood, South Carolina
- Party: Democratic (before 2003); Republican (2003–2016)
- Spouse: Aedra Gayle Tisdale
- Education: The Citadel
- Profession: businessman

William Hamilton O'Dell (October 11, 1938 – January 7, 2016) was an American businessman who served as a Republican in the South Carolina Senate from 1989 until his death. He was the CEO of O'Dell Corporation, Inc.

== Early life and education ==
O'Dell was the son of William B. and Sara Francis O'Dell and was born in Ware Shoals, South Carolina. O'Dell earned a bachelor's degree from The Citadel in 1960. He and his wife Aedra Gayle Tisdale are the parents of two children, William B. O'Dell and Patricia Michelle Foster. Prior to being elected to the South Carolina State Senate, O'Dell served as vice-chairman of the Ware Shoals School District 51 board, and later as director of the South Carolina Chamber of Commerce.

== South Carolina Senate ==
O'Dell was first elected to the South Carolina Senate in 1988. O'Dell was the chairman of the General committee. He also served on the Banking and Insurance, Finance, Interstate Cooperation and Labor, Commerce and Industry committees. O'Dell died in his sleep of a heart attack on January 7, 2016.
