= Mike Fair (South Carolina politician) =

American politician (born 1946)

Member of the South Carolina Senate from the 6th district
- In office October 7, 1995 – January 10, 2017
- Succeeded by: William Timmons

Member of the South Carolina House of Representatives
- In office 1984 – 1995

Personal details
- Born: June 16, 1946 (age 80)
- Party: Republican
- Spouse: Judy T. Hodge
- Relations: Meredith Fair, Michael Edmonds, Mcneil Edmonds, Madison Edmonds
- Education: University of South Carolina
- Profession: Insurance

Michael L. Fair (born June 16, 1946) is an American politician who represented the 6th District in the South Carolina Senate. Fair, a Republican, was a state senator from 1995 to 2017.

== Personal ==
Fair is a native, and lifelong, resident of Greenville, where he serves as a deacon at Faith Baptist Church. He graduated from Greenville's Parker High School, where he played baseball, basketball, and football and served as president of the student body. He married his high-school sweetheart, Judy, and the couple has a daughter and three grandchildren. Fair is a graduate of University of South Carolina, where he played quarterback on the Gamecock football team during the mid-1960s. Prior to being elected to the South Carolina General Assembly, Fair served for six years on Greenville County Council.

== South Carolina General Assembly ==
Fair was first elected to the South Carolina House of Representatives in 1984 and served until November 1995 when he was elected to the South Carolina State Senate. As chairman of the Corrections and Penology committee, he was criticized in Atlantic Monthly for not attempting to check mistreatment of mentally ill prisoners in the South Carolina prison system and claiming he had no knowledge of the mistreatment despite having chaired the task force that investigated the abuses. Fair also served on the Education, Finance and Medical Affairs committees.

Like approximately 40% of South Carolina state senators, Fair elected to take a yearly lifelong payout of $32,390 in deferred pay from the General Assembly Retirement System rather than his $10,400 salary.

In 2016, Fair faced a Republican primary challenge from lawyer William Timmons, which Fair lost in a runoff. Timmons went on to win in the general election that same year.

=== Political positions ===
Fair, a conservative Christian, is a supporter of abstinence-based sex education and proposed legislation mandating that sex education classes include information that homosexual behavior is "unnatural, unhealthy and illegal".

Fair supported the teaching of intelligent design in public schools. In 2008, he introduced a bill that would have specifically allowed public school teachers to critique evolution in their classrooms. The bill died in committee.

Fair is anti-abortion and referred to abortions as our nation’s holocaust. During a state senate debate over a proposed bill to ban abortions past 20 weeks, Fair said that according to Hitler "because you're a Jew, you had no right to live. In essence, some people are more qualified to live than others. And that's what we're saying here", referring to abortion.

In 2011, Fair proposed a bill that would have prohibited Sharia law from being enacted in the state of South Carolina. The following month, Fair unsuccessfully introduced legislation that would have prohibited Common Core educational standards from being imposed on South Carolina public schools.
