= Glenn G. Reese =

American politician

Member of the South Carolina Senate from the 11th district
- In office January 8, 1991 – January 12, 2021
- Preceded by: William Richard Lee
- Succeeded by: Josh Kimbrell

Personal details
- Born: January 6, 1942 (age 84) Greenville, South Carolina, U.S.
- Party: Democratic
- Profession: Educator, sports official, businessman

Glenn G. Reese (born January 6, 1942) is a former Democratic member of the South Carolina Senate, representing the 11th District based out of Spartanburg County, South Carolina.

== Early life and education ==
Reese is the son of Wilford William and Geneva Rose Reese. He was born in Greenville, South Carolina, and attended Chapman High School. He received his associate degree from Mars Hill College, his bachelor's from Auburn University and his master's from Converse College.

== South Carolina Senate ==
Reese was elected to the South Carolina Senate in 1990. He served on the Banking and Insurance, Ethics, Finance, General, Invitations, Labor, Commerce and Industry and Rules committees.

=== 1998 race for Congress ===
Reese was the Democratic candidate in South Carolina's 4th congressional district in 1998, losing to Republican Jim DeMint. Reese took 40 percent of the vote to DeMint's 57 percent. To date, he is the last reasonably well-funded Democrat to run in the district since Liz J. Patterson was unseated by Bob Inglis in 1992, and the only Democrat since then to clear the 40 percent mark. He did not have to give up his state senate seat to run for Congress; South Carolina state senate terms run concurrently with that of the President of the United States, and Reese was not up for reelection again until 2000.

== Sports official ==
Reese has also worked as a sports official. He has worked as a High School Sports Official in football, basketball & baseball. He officiated Division I NCAA basketball for 15 years in the Southern Conference. He's also officiated five national college championships in basketball, in four foreign countries: Soviet Union, Poland, Austria & Germany and at the Good-Will Game Trials in 1986.
