= Dick Elliott (politician) =

American politician

Member of the South Carolina Senate from the 28th district
- In office 1992–2012
- Preceded by: Gene Carmichael
- Succeeded by: Greg Hembree

Member of the South Carolina House of Representatives from the 104th district
- In office 1983–1992
- Preceded by: Charles Edward Hodges
- Succeeded by: Harold Gene "H.G." Worley

Personal details
- Born: September 26, 1935 Cassatt, South Carolina
- Died: June 7, 2014 (aged 78) Florence, South Carolina
- Party: Democratic
- Spouse: Anne Elliott
- Profession: Real estate developer

Dick Elliott (September 26, 1935 – June 7, 2014) was a Democratic member of the South Carolina Senate, representing the 28th District from 1992 to 2012. He was previously a member of the South Carolina House of Representatives from 1982 through 1992. He went to Wingate Junior College, now Wingate University, and to Clemson University. Elliott was a real estate developer. In 1959, he founded Elliott Realty, a real estate company. In 1971, he developed Eagle Nest Golf Course. He served on the Horry County, South Carolina Council and the North Myrtle Beach, South Carolina City Council.
