= Greg Gregory =

American politician

Member of the South Carolina Senate from the 16th district
- In office April 12, 2011 – November 8, 2020
- Preceded by: Mick Mulvaney
- Succeeded by: Michael Johnson
- In office 1993–2008
- Preceded by: Red Hinson
- Succeeded by: Mick Mulvaney

Personal details
- Born: March 18, 1963 (age 63) Lancaster, South Carolina
- Party: Republican
- Spouse: Sherri
- Children: Marshall and Ellen Gray
- Profession: Businessman

Chauncey Klugh "Greg" Gregory (born March 18, 1963) is an American politician who served as a Republican member of the South Carolina Senate.

== Childhood and education ==
Gregory is the son of C. D. Gregory, Jr. and Eleanor Purdy Tillman. He graduated from the University of South Carolina in 1985. He married Sherri Cauthen on January 4, 1986, they have two children. The Gregorys live in Lancaster, South Carolina and belong to the First Presbyterian Church.

== Career ==
He has represented the 16th District from 1992 through 2008, and again since 2011. In January 2008 he announced his retirement at the end of that year. Gregory expressed his wish to re-enter the State Senate, and he ran for the District sixteen seat in 2011 after it was vacated by newly elected Congressman Mick Mulvaney. He was re-elected after winning the five-way Republican primary outright, garnering seventy percent of the vote, thereby making history in South Carolina, as it was the first-five way primary where no run-off was needed. Gregory's current term expires in January, 2013. His current committees are Fish, Game and Forestry, Rules, Judiciary, Agriculture and Natural Resources, and Corrections and Penology.

Gregory represents Lancaster and York Counties and resides in the city of Lancaster. During his legislative career, Gregory's legal inquiries have led the South Carolina Attorney General's office to release several opinions against video gambling. Currently, Gregory is working toward restructuring the state government, to give the Governor more power, and therefore, greater accountability for the successes and failures of the state. He is the former chairman of the senate Fish, Game and Forestry committee, which, among other things, oversees the South Carolina Department of Natural Resources.

In 2009, Gregory was appointed to the board of trustees of the University of South Carolina by South Carolina Governor Mark Sanford. His term was to expire in 2012; however, he had to resign upon his re-election to the Senate.

Gregory is President of Builders Supply Co. in Lancaster.
