= John C. Land III =

American politician (born 1941)

Member of the South Carolina Senate from the 36th district
- In office 1976 – January 10, 2013
- Preceded by: n/a
- Succeeded by: Kevin L. Johnson

Member of the South Carolina House of Representatives from the 66th district
- Preceded by: n/a
- Succeeded by: Larry Blanding

Personal details
- Born: January 25, 1941 (age 85) Manning, South Carolina, U.S.
- Party: Democratic
- Spouse: Marie
- Children: 3
- Education: University of South Carolina (BS, JD)
- Profession: Attorney

John C. Land III (born January 10, 1941) is an American politician who is a former Democratic member of the South Carolina Senate, representing the 36th District from 1976 until 2013. He served in the South Carolina House of Representatives from 1975 to 1976.

Land attended University of South Carolina, where he became a member of the Sigma Chi fraternity, graduating in 1966. Land received his Juris Doctor from the University of South Carolina School of Law in 1968.

South Carolina House of Representatives
Preceded by District created	Member of the South Carolina House of Representatives from the 66th district 1975–1977	Succeeded by Alex Harvin
South Carolina Senate
Preceded by Thomas Otis Bowen; James McCullum Morris	Member of the South Carolina Senate from the 12th district 1977–1985; Served alongside: John Eagle Miles, Phil Peter Leventis	Succeeded by Gladys Elizabeth Johnston Patterson
Preceded by District created	Member of the South Carolina Senate from the 36th district 1985–2013	Succeeded by Kevin L. Johnson
