= 2020 South Carolina Senate election =

- November 3, 2020

All 46 seats in the South Carolina Senate 24 seats needed for a majority
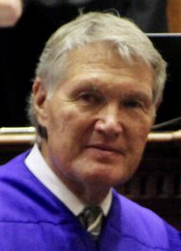

	Majority party	Minority party
Leader	Harvey S. Peeler Jr.	Nikki G. Setzler (stepped down)
Party	Republican	Democratic
Leader since	January 8, 2019	November 12, 2012
Leader's seat	14th	26th
Last election	28	18
Seats before	27	19
Seats after	30	16
Seat change	▲3	▼3
Popular vote	1,399,659	924,535
Percentage	59.52%	39.31%
- Results: Republican gain Republican hold Democratic hold
President pro-tempore before election
Harvey S. Peeler Jr.
Republican
Elected President pro-tempore
Harvey S. Peeler Jr.
Republican

The 2020 South Carolina State Senate elections took place as part of the biennial 2020 United States elections. South Carolina voters elected state senators in all 46 senate districts. State senators serve four-year terms in the South Carolina Senate, with all of the seats up for election each cycle. The primary elections on June 9, 2020, determined which candidates appeared on the November 3, 2020, general election ballot.

Following the previous election in 2016, Republicans had control of the South Carolina Senate with 27 seats to Democrats' 19 seats.

== Special Election ==
=== District 3 (May 30, 2017) ===
Following the succession of Republican Kevin Bryant to Lieutenant Governor of South Carolina, the seat for District 3 became vacant. A primary was held April 11, a primary runoff was held on April 25, and the special election took place on May 30, 2017. The primary field was initially crowded with eight candidates including:

- Don Bowen: ex-Representative of the 8th district in the South Carolina House of Representatives, 2007–2014.
- Carol Burdette: Ex-towncouncil member and ex-Mayor of Pendleton, South Carolina.
- Richard Cash: A business owner and anti-abortion activist. He previously challenged Lindsey Graham for his U.S. Senate seat in the 2014 United States Senate election in South Carolina with campaign messaging that Graham isn't conservative enough. Cash came in third in that primary with roughly 8% of the vote (26,000 votes).
- James Galyean: Attorney who previously spent eight years as a chief counsel to the United States Senate Judiciary Committee.
- John William Tucker Jr.: ex-Representative of the 4th district in the South Carolina House of Representatives, 1985–1996.

Bryant endorsed Cash, and Cash ultimately won the primary after a head-to-head runoff with Burdette. Although he faced an uncontested general election, a last minute write-in effort was attempted. The majority of the write-ins were for Burdette, though she denied participating in the effort. Ultimately, the effort failed and Cash received almost 82% of the vote.

South Carolina Senate District 3 Special Election Republican Primary
Party	Candidate	Votes	%
Republican	Dean Allen	90	1.1
Republican	Corey Bott	79	1.0
Republican	Don Bowen	313	4.0
Republican	Carol Burdette	2,402	30.5
Republican	Richard Cash	2,032	25.8
Republican	James Galyean	840	10.7
Republican	Brad Johnson	293	3.7
Republican	John Tucker	1,821	23.2
Total votes		7,870	100.0

South Carolina Senate District 3 Special Election Republican Primary Runoff
Party	Candidate	Votes	%
Republican	Carol Burdette	4,082	45.6
Republican	Richard Cash	4,869	54.4
Total votes		8,951	100.0

South Carolina Senate District 3 Special Election
Party	Candidate	Votes	%
Republican	Richard Cash	3,035	81.7
Write-In		680	18.3
Total votes		3,715	100.0
Republican hold			

=== District 20 (November 6, 2018) ===
In March 2017, Republican John Courson was suspended from his seat on charges of corruption in the South Carolina State House. After pleading guilty to misconduct in office, he resigned in June, triggering a special election. Democratic and Republican primaries were held on August 14, a Republican primary runoff was held on August 28, and a special election was held on November 6, concurrently with the 2018 South Carolina House of Representatives election. Ultimately, Courson would escape jail time and only be required to perform 100 hours of community service for using campaign funds for personal expenses.

South Carolina Senate District 20 Special Election Republican Primary
Party	Candidate	Votes	%
Republican	Benjamin Dunn	1,254	32.3
Republican	John Holler	960	24.8
Republican	Christian Stegmaier	838	21.6
Republican	Bill Turbeville	827	21.3
Total votes		3,879	100.0

South Carolina Senate District 20 Special Election Democratic Primary
Party	Candidate	Votes	%
Democratic	Dick Harpootlian	2,662	80.7
Democratic	Kyle Lacio	275	8.3
Democratic	Dayna Alane Smith	362	11.0
Total votes		3,299	100.0

South Carolina Senate District 20 Special Election Republican Primary Runoff
Party	Candidate	Votes	%
Republican	Benjamin Dunn	1,750	57.2
Republican	John Holler	1,312	42.8
Total votes		3,062	100.0

South Carolina Senate District 20 Special Election
Party	Candidate	Votes	%
Republican	Benjamin Dunn	19,481	47.6
Democratic	Dick Harpootlian	21,408	52.3
Write-In		55	0.1
Total votes		40,944	100.0
Democratic gain from Republican			

=== District 6 (March 26, 2019) ===
After William Timmons succeeded Trey Gowdy in representing South Carolina's 4th Congressional district in the U.S. House of Representatives, a special election was held to find a replacement senator for the 6th District. A Republican primary was held on January 22 and a special election was held on March 26.

South Carolina Senate District 6 Special Election Republican Primary
Party	Candidate	Votes	%
Republican	Amy Ryberg Doyle	2,569	40.4
Republican	Dwight Loftis	3,528	55.4
Republican	Jeffrey Stringer	270	4.2
Total votes		6,367	100.0

South Carolina Senate District 6 Special Election
Party	Candidate	Votes	%
Republican	Dwight Loftis	4,440	55.6
Democratic	Tina Belge	3,537	44.3
Write-In		3	0.0
Total votes		7,980	100.0
Republican hold			

== Results ==
Party	Votes		Seats		
Party	No.	%	No.	+/−	%
South Carolina Republican Party	1,399,659	59.52	30	+3	65.22
South Carolina Democratic Party	924,535	39.31	16	-3	34.78
Write-in	17,735	0.75	0	0	0.00
Alliance Party	7,928	0.34	0	0	0.00
Libertarian Party of South Carolina	1,909	0.08	0	0	0.00
Total	2,351,766	100.00	46	±0	100.00
Registered voters	3,547,181	100.00			
Turnout	2,351,766	66.3			
Source: South Carolina Election Commission

Popular vote
Republican	59.52%
Democratic	39.31%
Other	1.17%

Senate seats
Republican	65.22%
Democratic	34.78%

== Summary ==
District	Incumbent	Party	Elected Senator	Party	Result
1st	Thomas C. Alexander	Rep	Thomas C. Alexander (Note: Running unopposed in the general election.)	Rep	Republican HOLD
2nd	Rex Rice	Rep	Rex Rice	Rep	Republican HOLD
3rd	Richard Cash	Rep	Richard Cash	Rep	Republican HOLD
4th	Michael Gambrell	Rep	Michael Gambrell	Rep	Republican HOLD
5th	Tom Corbin	Rep	Tom Corbin	Rep	Republican HOLD
6th	Dwight Loftis	Rep	Dwight Loftis	Rep	Republican HOLD
7th	Karl B. Allen	Dem	Karl B. Allen	Dem	Democratic HOLD
8th	Ross Turner	Rep	Ross Turner	Rep	Republican HOLD
9th	Danny Verdin	Rep	Danny Verdin	Rep	Republican HOLD
10th	Floyd Nicholson	Dem	Billy Garrett	Rep	Republican GAIN
11th	Glenn G. Reese	Dem	Josh Kimbrell	Rep	Republican GAIN
12th	Scott Talley	Rep	Scott Talley	Rep	Republican HOLD
13th	Shane Martin	Rep	Shane Martin	Rep	Republican HOLD
14th	Harvey S. Peeler Jr.	Rep	Harvey S. Peeler Jr.	Rep	Republican HOLD
15th	Wes Climer	Rep	Wes Climer	Rep	Republican HOLD
16th	Greg Gregory (Note: Not seeking reelection, therefore this seat is open.)	Rep	Michael Johnson	Rep	Republican HOLD
17th	Mike Fanning	Dem	Mike Fanning	Dem	Democratic HOLD
18th	Ronnie Cromer	Rep	Ronnie Cromer	Rep	Republican HOLD
19th	John L. Scott Jr.	Dem	John L. Scott Jr.	Dem	Democratic HOLD
20th	Dick Harpootlian	Dem	Dick Harpootlian	Dem	Democratic HOLD
21st	Darrell Jackson	Dem	Darrell Jackson	Dem	Democratic HOLD
22nd	Mia McLeod	Dem	Mia McLeod	Dem	Democratic HOLD
23rd	Katrina Shealy	Rep	Katrina Shealy	Rep	Republican HOLD
24th	Tom Young Jr.	Rep	Tom Young Jr.	Rep	Republican HOLD
25th	A. Shane Massey	Rep	A. Shane Massey	Rep	Republican HOLD
26th	Nikki G. Setzler	Dem	Nikki G. Setzler	Dem	Democratic HOLD
27th	Vincent Sheheen	Dem	Penry Gustafson	Rep	Republican GAIN
28th	Greg Hembree	Rep	Greg Hembree	Rep	Republican HOLD
29th	Gerald Malloy	Dem	Gerald Malloy	Dem	Democratic HOLD
30th	Kent M. Williams	Dem	Kent M. Williams	Dem	Democratic HOLD
31st	Hugh Leatherman	Rep	Hugh Leatherman	Rep	Republican HOLD
32nd	Ronnie A. Sabb	Dem	Ronnie A. Sabb	Dem	Democratic HOLD
33rd	Luke A. Rankin	Rep	Luke A. Rankin	Rep	Republican HOLD
34th	Stephen Goldfinch	Rep	Stephen Goldfinch	Rep	Republican HOLD
35th	Thomas McElveen	Dem	Thomas McElveen	Dem	Democratic HOLD
36th	Kevin L. Johnson	Dem	Kevin L. Johnson	Dem	Democratic HOLD
37th	Larry Grooms	Rep	Larry Grooms	Rep	Republican HOLD
38th	Sean Bennett	Rep	Sean Bennett	Rep	Republican HOLD
39th	John W. Matthews Jr.	Dem	Vernon Stephens	Dem	Democratic HOLD
40th	Brad Hutto	Dem	Brad Hutto	Dem	Democratic HOLD
41st	Sandy Senn	Rep	Sandy Senn	Rep	Republican HOLD
42nd	Marlon Kimpson	Dem	Marlon Kimpson	Dem	Democratic HOLD
43rd	Chip Campsen	Rep	Chip Campsen	Rep	Republican HOLD
44th	Paul G. Campbell Jr.	Rep	Brian Adams	Rep	Republican HOLD
45th	Margie Bright Matthews	Dem	Margie Bright Matthews	Dem	Democratic HOLD
46th	Tom Davis	Rep	Tom Davis	Rep	Republican HOLD

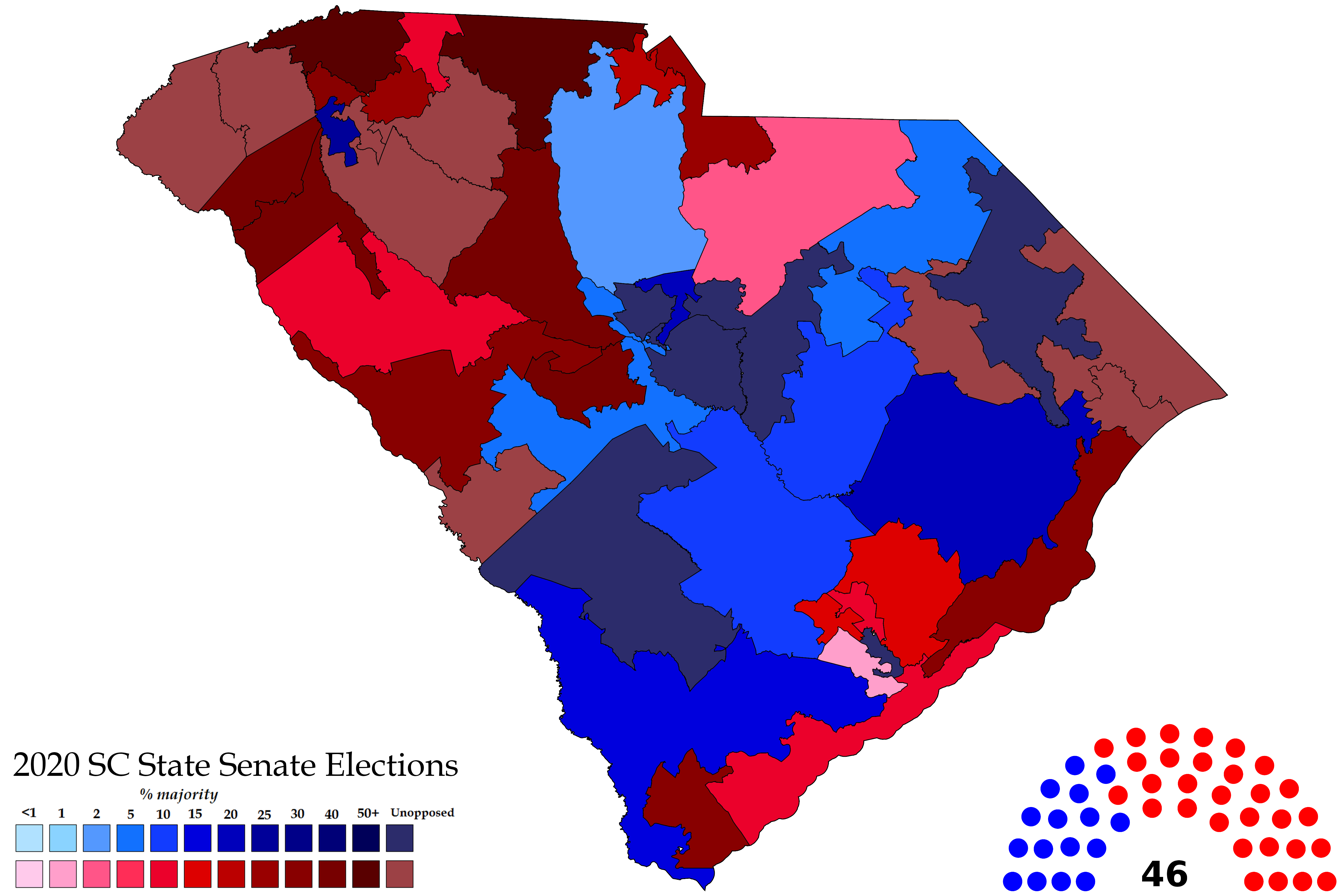
District Results

== Outgoing incumbents ==
=== Retiring ===
==== Democrats ====
- John W. Matthews Jr. (D–Orangeburg), representing District 39 since 1984. He had previously served in the South Carolina House of Representatives from 1975 to 1984. He announced that he would not seek re-election on March 10, 2020.

==== Republicans ====
- Greg Gregory (R–Lancaster), representing District 16 from 1992 to 2008 and then since 2011. He announced that he would not seek re-election on October 23, 2019.
- Paul G. Campbell Jr. (R–Berkeley), representing District 44 since 2007. He announced that he would not seek re-election on March 23, 2020.

=== Defeated ===
No incumbents were defeated in their primaries.

- Luke A. Rankin (R–Horry), who has represented District 33 since 1992, was the only incumbent whose primary was forced to go to a runoff after he failed to obtain a majority share of the vote. The runoff took place on June 23, 2020, between Rankin and challenger John Gallman, and was won by Rankin.

== Predictions ==
Source	Ranking	As of
The Cook Political Report	Safe R	October 21, 2020

== Detailed results ==
=== District 1 ===
District 1 covers parts of Oconee and Pickens Counties. Incumbent Thomas C. Alexander ran unopposed in the Republican primary and the general election. He was reelected to a seventh full-term in the Senate.

South Carolina Senate District 1 General Election, 2020
Party	Candidate	Votes	%
Republican	Thomas C. Alexander	39,794	98.0
Write-in		804	2.0
Total votes		40,598	100.0
Republican hold			

=== District 2 ===
District 2 is a part of Pickens County. Incumbent Rex Rice ran unopposed in the Republican primary and the general election. He was reelected to his second term in office.

South Carolina Senate District 2 General Election, 2020
Party	Candidate	Votes	%
Republican	Rex Rice	44,116	98.1
Write-in		856	1.9
Total votes		44,972	100.0
Republican hold			

=== District 3 ===
District 3 consists of the Northern parts of Anderson County.

Incumbent Richard Cash was challenged by Anderson County Councilman Craig Wooten in the Republican Primary. Both candidates took conservative stances, opposing abortion and illegal immigration while supporting the Second Amendment, economic development in the wake of COVID-19, and infrastructure improvements. Cash framed his candidacy around being a proven conservative who introduced legislation to stop abortions in South Carolina and to expand the rights to conceal-carry weapons. In contrast, Wooten framed himself as a less absolutist, more pragmatic conservative who sought to politically elevate Anderson County to the level of other major areas in South Carolina, such as Charleston, Greenville, and Columbia. During the primary race, over $150,000 was raised, and Cash was endorsed by the NRA Political Victory Fund, Republican Liberty Caucus, and South Carolina Citizens for Life. Cash defeated Wooten with 57% of the vote.

Retired teacher Judith Polson ran unopposed in the Democratic primary. In the general election, Cash was again endorsed by the same groups with the addition of the SC Chamber of Commerce. Cash was reelected with 74% of the vote, marking his first election to a full term.

South Carolina Senate District 3 Republican Primary Election, 2020
Party	Candidate	Votes	%
Republican	Richard Cash (incumbent)	9,411	56.8
Republican	Craig Wooten	7,169	43.2
Total votes		16,580	100.0

South Carolina Senate District 3 General Election, 2020
Party	Candidate	Votes	%
Republican	Richard Cash (incumbent)	44,446	74.0
Democratic	Judith Polson	15,533	25.9
Write-in		55	0.1
Total votes		60,034	100.0
Republican hold			

=== District 4 ===
District 4 is made up of parts of Abbeville, Anderson and Greenwood Counties. Incumbent Michael Gambrell ran unopposed in the Republican primary. Jose Villa ran unopposed in the Democratic primary. In the general election, Villa campaigned on Medicaid expansion and education and criminal justice reform. However, Gambrell defeated him with 73% of the vote, and was elected to his second term.

South Carolina Senate District 4 General Election, 2020
Party	Candidate	Votes	%
Republican	Michael Gambrell (incumbent)	31,129	72.7
Democratic	Jose Villa	11,651	27.2
Write-in		33	0.1
Total votes		42,813	100.0
Republican hold			

=== District 5 ===
Incumbent Tom Corbin faced opposition in the Republican primary. Michael McCord ran unopposed in the Democratic primary.

South Carolina Senate District 5 Republican Primary Election, 2020
Party	Candidate	Votes	%
Republican	Tom Corbin (incumbent)	9,254	70.4
Republican	Dave Edwards	3,896	29.6
Total votes		13,150	100.0

South Carolina Senate District 5 General Election, 2020
Party	Candidate	Votes	%
Republican	Tom Corbin (incumbent)	44,808	76.1
Democratic	Michael McCord	14,013	23.8
Write-in		39	0.1
Total votes		58,860	100.0
Republican hold			

=== District 6 ===
Incumbent Dwight Loftis ran unopposed in the Republican primary. Hao Wu ran unopposed in the Democratic primary.

South Carolina Senate District 6 General Election, 2020
Party	Candidate	Votes	%
Republican	Dwight Loftis (incumbent)	33,300	65.1
Democratic	Hao Wu	17,768	34.8
Write-in		61	0.1
Total votes		51,129	100.0
Republican hold			

=== District 7 ===
Incumbent Karl B. Allen faced opposition in the Democratic primary. Jack Logan ran unopposed in the Republican primary.

South Carolina Senate District 7 Democratic Primary Election, 2020
Party	Candidate	Votes	%
Democratic	Karl B. Allen (incumbent)	6,208	70.1
Democratic	Fletcher Smith	2,645	29.9
Total votes		8,853	100.0

South Carolina Senate District 7 General Election, 2020
Party	Candidate	Votes	%
Democratic	Karl B. Allen (incumbent)	26,672	62.5
Republican	Jack Logan	15,886	37.2
Write-in		107	0.3
Total votes		42,665	100.0
Democratic hold			

=== District 8 ===
Incumbent Ross Turner faced opposition in the Republican primary, but ran unopposed in the general election.

South Carolina Senate District 8 Republican Primary Election, 2020
Party	Candidate	Votes	%
Republican	Ross Turner (incumbent)	9,435	68.2
Republican	Janice Curtis	4,399	31.8
Total votes		13,834	100.0

South Carolina Senate District 8 General Election, 2020
Party	Candidate	Votes	%
Republican	Ross Turner (incumbent)	49,180	96.4
Write-in		1,859	3.6
Total votes		51,039	100.0
Republican hold			

=== District 9 ===
Incumbent Danny Verdin ran unopposed in the Republican primary and the general election.

South Carolina Senate District 9 General Election, 2020
Party	Candidate	Votes	%
Republican	Danny Verdin (incumbent)	39,049	96.9
Write-in		1,230	3.1
Total votes		40,279	100.0
Republican hold			

=== District 10 ===
Incumbent Floyd Nicholson ran unopposed in the Democratic primary. Two candidates ran in the Republican primary.

South Carolina Senate District 10 Republican Primary Election, 2020
Party	Candidate	Votes	%
Republican	Billy Garrett	5,406	53.5
Republican	Bryan Hope	4,698	46.5
Total votes		10,104	100.0

South Carolina Senate District 10 General Election, 2020
Party	Candidate	Votes	%
Republican	Billy Garrett	23,989	56.0
Democratic	Floyd Nicholson (incumbent)	18,841	43.9
Write-in		40	0.1
Total votes		42,870	100.0
Republican gain from Democratic			

=== District 11 ===
Incumbent Glenn Reese ran unopposed in the Democratic primary. Josh Kimbrell ran unopposed in the Republican primary.

South Carolina Senate District 11 General Election, 2020
Party	Candidate	Votes	%
Republican	Josh Kimbrell	26,117	55.3
Democratic	Glenn Reese (incumbent)	21,005	44.5
Write-in		75	0.2
Total votes		47,197	100.0
Republican gain from Democratic			

=== District 12 ===
Incumbent Scott Talley faced opposition in the Republican primary. Dawn Bingham ran unopposed in the Democratic primary.

South Carolina Senate District 12 Republican Primary Election, 2020
Party	Candidate	Votes	%
Republican	Scott Talley (incumbent)	8,011	52.8
Republican	Mark Lynch	7,157	47.2
Total votes		15,168	100.0

South Carolina Senate District 12 General Election, 2020
Party	Candidate	Votes	%
Republican	Scott Talley (incumbent)	42,201	64.9
Democratic	Dawn Bingham	22,759	35.0
Write-in		104	0.1
Total votes		65,064	100.0
Republican hold			

=== District 13 ===
Incumbent Shane Martin ran unopposed in the Republican primary and the general election.

South Carolina Senate District 13 General Election, 2020
Party	Candidate	Votes	%
Republican	Shane Martin (incumbent)	43,138	97.2
Write-in		1,260	2.8
Total votes		44,398	100.0
Republican hold			

=== District 14 ===
Incumbent Harvey S. Peeler Jr. ran unopposed in the Republican primary, but faced opposition from a third-party candidate in the general election.

South Carolina Senate District 14 General Election, 2020
Party	Candidate	Votes	%
Republican	Harvey S. Peeler Jr. (incumbent)	42,377	83.9
Alliance	Sarah Work	7,928	15.7
Write-in		229	0.4
Total votes		50,534	100.0
Republican hold			

=== District 15 ===
Incumbent Wes Climer ran unopposed in the Republican primary. Vickie Holt ran unopposed in the Democratic primary.

South Carolina Senate District 15 General Election, 2020
Party	Candidate	Votes	%
Republican	Wes Climer (incumbent)	39,121	60.2
Democratic	Vickie Holt	25,848	39.8
Write-in		48	0.1
Total votes		65,017	100.0
Republican hold			

=== District 16 ===
This seat was one of three open seats in this election cycle. Four candidates ran in the Republican primary, with two advancing to a runoff. Ramin Mammadov ran unopposed in the Democratic primary.

South Carolina Senate District 16 Republican Primary Election, 2020
Party	Candidate	Votes	%
Republican	Tom Nichols	4,203	31.9
Republican	Michael Johnson	3,583	27.2
Republican	Kristen Blanchard	3,483	26.4
Republican	Mike Neese	1,922	14.6
Total votes		13,191	100.0

South Carolina Senate District 16 Republican Primary Runoff Election, 2020
Party	Candidate	Votes	%
Republican	Michael Johnson	4,686	54.8
Republican	Tom Nichols	3,864	45.2
Total votes		8,550	100.0

South Carolina Senate District 16 General Election, 2020
Party	Candidate	Votes	%
Republican	Michael Johnson	48,801	63.2
Democratic	Ramin Mammadov	28,287	36.7
Write-in		64	0.1
Total votes		77,152	100.0
Republican hold			

=== District 17 ===
Incumbent Mike Fanning faced opposition in the Democratic primary. Erin Mosley ran unopposed in the Republican primary.

South Carolina Senate District 17 Democratic Primary Election, 2020
Party	Candidate	Votes	%
Democratic	Mike Fanning (incumbent)	7,823	67.9
Democratic	MaryGail Douglas	3,694	32.1
Total votes		11,517	100.0

South Carolina Senate District 17 General Election, 2020
Party	Candidate	Votes	%
Democratic	Mike Fanning (incumbent)	26,724	51.5
Republican	Erin Mosley	25,114	48.4
Write-in		47	0.1
Total votes		51,885	100.0
Democratic hold			

=== District 18 ===
Incumbent Ronnie Cromer faced opposition in the Republican primary. Christopher Thibault ran unopposed in the Democratic primary.

South Carolina Senate District 18 Republican Primary Election, 2020
Party	Candidate	Votes	%
Republican	Ronnie Cromer (incumbent)	10,331	62.1
Republican	Charles Bumgardner	6,294	37.9
Total votes		16,625	100.0

South Carolina Senate District 18 General Election, 2020
Party	Candidate	Votes	%
Republican	Ronnie Cromer (incumbent)	46,032	72.2
Democratic	Christopher Thibault	17,639	27.7
Write-in		64	0.1
Total votes		63,735	100.0
Republican hold			

=== District 19 ===
Incumbent John L. Scott Jr. ran unopposed in the Democratic primary and the general election.

South Carolina Senate District 19 General Election, 2020
Party	Candidate	Votes	%
Democratic	John L. Scott Jr. (incumbent)	42,097	98.8
Write-in		528	1.2
Total votes		42,625	100.0
Democratic hold			

=== District 20 ===
Incumbent Dick Harpootlian ran unopposed in the Democratic primary. Two candidates ran in the Republican primary.

South Carolina Senate District 20 Republican Primary Election, 2020
Party	Candidate	Votes	%
Republican	Benjamin Dunn	5,942	71.5
Republican	Randy Dickey	2,365	28.5
Total votes		8,307	100.0

South Carolina Senate District 20 General Election, 2020
Party	Candidate	Votes	%
Democratic	Dick Harpootlian (incumbent)	29,227	53.2
Republican	Benjamin Dunn	25,562	46.6
Write-in		108	0.2
Total votes		54,897	100.0
Democratic hold			

=== District 21 ===
Incumbent Darrell Jackson ran unopposed in the Democratic primary and the general election.

South Carolina Senate District 21 General Election, 2020
Party	Candidate	Votes	%
Democratic	Darrell Jackson (incumbent)	33,279	97.9
Write-in		711	2.1
Total votes		33,990	100.0
Democratic hold			

=== District 22 ===
Incumbent Mia McLeod ran unopposed in the Democratic primary. Two candidates ran in the Republican primary.

South Carolina Senate District 22 Republican Primary Election, 2020
Party	Candidate	Votes	%
Republican	Lee Blatt	3,393	75.8
Republican	David Larsen	1,081	24.2
Total votes		4,474	100.0

South Carolina Senate District 22 General Election, 2020
Party	Candidate	Votes	%
Democratic	Mia McLeod (incumbent)	35,438	62.2
Republican	Lee Blatt	21,525	37.8
Write-in		43	0.1
Total votes		57,006	100.0
Democratic hold			

=== District 23 ===
Incumbent Katrina Shealy ran unopposed in the Republican primary. Bill Brown ran unopposed in the Democratic primary.

South Carolina Senate District 23 General Election, 2020
Party	Candidate	Votes	%
Republican	Katrina Shealy (incumbent)	34,050	72.5
Democratic	Bill Brown	12,849	27.4
Write-in		60	0.1
Total votes		46,959	100.0
Republican hold			

=== District 24 ===
Incumbent Tom Young Jr. ran unopposed in the Republican primary. Lisa Williams was set to run unopposed in the Democratic primary, but withdrew before it took place.

South Carolina Senate District 24 General Election, 2020
Party	Candidate	Votes	%
Republican	Tom Young Jr. (incumbent)	43,148	97.0
Write-in		1,353	3.0
Total votes		44,501	100.0
Republican hold			

=== District 25 ===
Incumbent A. Shane Massey faced opposition in the Republican primary. Shirley Green Fayson ran unopposed in the Democratic primary.

South Carolina Senate District 25 Republican Primary Election, 2020
Party	Candidate	Votes	%
Republican	A. Shane Massey (incumbent)	10,339	78.8
Republican	Susan Swanson	2,775	21.2
Total votes		13,114	100.0

South Carolina Senate District 25 General Election, 2020
Party	Candidate	Votes	%
Republican	A. Shane Massey (incumbent)	37,009	69.5
Democratic	Shirley Green Fayson	16,153	30.4
Write-in		49	0.1
Total votes		53,211	100.0
Republican hold			

=== District 26 ===
Incumbent Nikki G. Setzler ran unopposed in the Democratic primary. Two candidates ran in the Republican primary.

South Carolina Senate District 26 Republican Primary Election, 2020
Party	Candidate	Votes	%
Republican	Chris Smith	6,655	68.8
Republican	Perry Finch	3,020	31.2
Total votes		9,675	100.0

South Carolina Senate District 26 General Election, 2020
Party	Candidate	Votes	%
Democratic	Nikki G. Setzler (incumbent)	23,378	54.4
Republican	Chris Smith	19,538	45.5
Write-in		38	0.1
Total votes		42,954	100.0
Democratic hold			

=== District 27 ===
Incumbent Vincent Sheheen ran unopposed in the Democratic primary. Penry Gustafson ran unopposed in the Republican primary.

South Carolina Senate District 27 General Election, 2020
Party	Candidate	Votes	%
Republican	Penry Gustafson	22,294	51.0
Democratic	Vincent Sheheen (incumbent)	21,406	48.9
Write-in		41	0.1
Total votes		43,741	100.0
Republican gain from Democratic			

=== District 28 ===
Incumbent Greg Hembree ran unopposed in the Republican primary and the general election.

South Carolina Senate District 28 General Election, 2020
Party	Candidate	Votes	%
Republican	Greg Hembree (incumbent)	48,996	98.4
Write-in		817	1.6
Total votes		49,813	100.0
Republican hold			

=== District 29 ===
Incumbent Gerald Malloy ran unopposed in the Democratic primary. Two candidates ran in the Republican primary.

South Carolina Senate District 29 Republican Primary Election, 2020
Party	Candidate	Votes	%
Republican	JD Chaplin	4,153	82.4
Republican	Ronald Page	887	17.6
Total votes		5,040	100.0

South Carolina Senate District 29 General Election, 2020
Party	Candidate	Votes	%
Democratic	Gerald Malloy (incumbent)	22,877	53.7
Republican	JD Chaplin	19,693	46.2
Write-in		60	0.1
Total votes		42,630	
Democratic hold			

=== District 30 ===
Incumbent Kent M. Williams faced opposition in the Democratic primary, but ran unopposed in the general election.

South Carolina Senate District 30 Democratic Primary Election, 2020
Party	Candidate	Votes	%
Democratic	Kent M. Williams (incumbent)	13,118	76.7
Democratic	Patrick Richardson	3,978	23.3
Total votes		17,096	100.0

South Carolina Senate District 30 General Election, 2020
Party	Candidate	Votes	%
Democratic	Kent M. Williams (incumbent)	32,882	97.9
Write-in		703	2.1
Total votes		33,585	100.0
Democratic hold			

=== District 31 ===
Incumbent Hugh Leatherman ran unopposed in the Republican primary and the general election.

South Carolina Senate District 31 General Election, 2020
Party	Candidate	Votes	%
Republican	Hugh Leatherman (incumbent)	37,168	97.3
Write-in		1,035	2.7
Total votes		38,203	100.0
Republican hold			

=== District 32 ===
Incumbent Ronnie A. Sabb faced opposition in the Democratic primary. David Ellison ran unopposed in the Republican primary.

South Carolina Senate District 32 Democratic Primary Election, 2020
Party	Candidate	Votes	%
Democratic	Ronnie A. Sabb (incumbent)	9,492	71.2
Democratic	Ted Brown	2,128	16.0
Democratic	Kelly Spann Jr.	1,471	11.0
Democratic	Manley Collins	237	1.8
Total votes		13,328	100.0

South Carolina Senate District 32 General Election, 2020
Party	Candidate	Votes	%
Democratic	Ronnie A. Sabb (incumbent)	27,284	60.6
Republican	David Ellison	17,714	39.3
Write-in		54	0.1
Total votes		45,052	100.0
Democratic hold			

=== District 33 ===
Incumbent Luke A. Rankin faced opposition in the Republican primary, but ran unopposed in the general election.

South Carolina Senate District 33 Republican Primary Election, 2020
Party	Candidate	Votes	%
Republican	Luke A. Rankin (incumbent)	4,915	40.2
Republican	John Gallman	4,210	34.4
Republican	Carter Smith	3,105	25.4
Total votes		12,320	100.0

South Carolina Senate District 33 Republican Primary Runoff Election, 2020
Party	Candidate	Votes	%
Republican	Luke A. Rankin (incumbent)	6,222	58.4
Republican	John Gallman	4,430	41.6
Total votes		10,652	100.0

South Carolina Senate District 33 General Election, 2020
Party	Candidate	Votes	%
Republican	Luke A. Rankin (incumbent)	49,492	97.0
Write-in		1,538	3.0
Total votes		51,030	100.0
Republican hold			

=== District 34 ===
Incumbent Stephen Goldfinch ran unopposed in the Republican primary. Emily Cegledy ran unopposed in the Democratic primary.

South Carolina Senate District 34 General Election, 2020
Party	Candidate	Votes	%
Republican	Stephen Goldfinch (incumbent)	54,384	66.7
Democratic	Emily Cegledy	27,081	33.2
Write-in		66	0.1
Total votes		81,531	100.0
Republican hold			

=== District 35 ===
Incumbent Thomas McElveen ran unopposed in the Democratic primary and the general election.

South Carolina Senate District 35 General Election, 2020
Party	Candidate	Votes	%
Democratic	Thomas McElveen (incumbent)	36,210	96.2
Write-in		1,433	3.8
Total votes		37,643	100.0
Democratic hold			

=== District 36 ===
Incumbent Kevin L. Johnson faced opposition in the Democratic primary. Leon Winn ran unopposed in the Republican primary.

South Carolina Senate District 36 Democratic Primary Election, 2020
Party	Candidate	Votes	%
Democratic	Kevin L. Johnson (incumbent)	7,106	74.9
Democratic	Eleazer Carter	2,376	25.1
Total votes		9,482	100.0

South Carolina Senate District 36 General Election, 2020
Party	Candidate	Votes	%
Democratic	Kevin L. Johnson (incumbent)	25,183	57.4
Republican	Leon Winn	18,611	42.5
Write-in		44	0.1
Total votes		43,838	100.0
Democratic hold			

=== District 37 ===
Incumbent Larry Grooms ran unopposed in the Republican primary. Kathryn Whitaker ran unopposed in the Democratic primary. A third-party candidate also contested the general election.

South Carolina Senate District 37 General Election, 2020
Party	Candidate	Votes	%
Republican	Larry Grooms (incumbent)	42,915	58.7
Democratic	Kathryn Whitaker	28,266	38.6
Libertarian	Steve French	1,909	2.6
Write-in		58	0.1
Total votes		73,148	100.0
Republican hold			

=== District 38 ===
Incumbent Sean Bennett ran unopposed in the Republican primary. John Lowe ran unopposed in the Democratic primary.

South Carolina Senate District 38 General Election, 2020
Party	Candidate	Votes	%
Republican	Sean Bennett (incumbent)	35,068	58.8
Democratic	John Lowe	24,462	41.1
Write-in		66	0.1
Total votes		59,596	100.0
Republican hold			

=== District 39 ===
This seat was one of three open seats in this election cycle. Four candidates ran in the Democratic primary, with two advancing to a runoff. Tom Connor ran unopposed in the Republican primary.

South Carolina Senate District 39 Democratic Primary Election, 2020
Party	Candidate	Votes	%
Democratic	Vernon Stephens	4,901	41.4
Democratic	Cindy Evans	4,624	38.8
Democratic	William Johnson	1,864	15.6
Democratic	Jerry Montgomery	532	4.5
Total votes		11,921	100.0

South Carolina Senate District 39 Democratic Primary Runoff Election, 2020
Party	Candidate	Votes	%
Democratic	Vernon Stephens	3,968	65.2
Democratic	Cindy Evans	2,120	34.8
Total votes		6,088	100.0

South Carolina Senate District 39 General Election, 2020
Party	Candidate	Votes	%
Democratic	Vernon Stephens	25,351	56.5
Republican	Tom Connor	19,500	43.4
Write-in		38	0.1
Total votes		44,889	100.0
Democratic hold			

=== District 40 ===
Incumbent Brad Hutto faced opposition in the Democratic primary, but ran unopposed in the general election.

South Carolina Senate District 40 Democratic Primary Election, 2020
Party	Candidate	Votes	%
Democratic	Brad Hutto (incumbent)	10,750	71.0
Democratic	Michael Addison	4,400	29.0
Total votes		15,150	100.0

South Carolina Senate District 40 General Election, 2020
Party	Candidate	Votes	%
Democratic	Brad Hutto (incumbent)	28,958	97.6
Write-in		726	2.4
Total votes		29,684	100.0
Democratic hold			

=== District 41 ===
Incumbent Sandy Senn faced no opposition in the Republican primary. Two candidates ran in the Democratic primary.

South Carolina Senate District 41 Democratic Primary Election, 2020
Party	Candidate	Votes	%
Democratic	Sam Skardon	6,672	63.0
Democratic	Jason Mills	3,911	37.0
Total votes		10,583	100.0

South Carolina Senate District 41 General Election, 2020
Party	Candidate	Votes	%
Republican	Sandy Senn (incumbent)	37,234	50.9
Democratic	Sam Skardon	35,926	49.0
Write-in		60	0.1
Total votes		73,220	100.0
Republican hold			

=== District 42 ===
Incumbent Marlon Kimpson ran unopposed in the Democratic primary and the general election.

South Carolina Senate District 42 General Election, 2020
Party	Candidate	Votes	%
Democratic	Marlon Kimpson (incumbent)	35,299	98.0
Write-in		705	2.0
Total votes		36,004	100.0
Democratic hold			

=== District 43 ===
Incumbent Chip Campsen ran unopposed in the Republican primary. Richard Hricik ran unopposed in the Democratic primary.

South Carolina Senate District 43 General Election, 2020
Party	Candidate	Votes	%
Republican	Chip Campsen (incumbent)	37,938	56.2
Democratic	Richard Hricik	29,550	43.7
Write-in		59	0.1
Total votes		67,547	100.0
Republican hold			

=== District 44 ===
This seat was one of three open seats in this election cycle. Two candidates ran in the Democratic primary, and two candidates ran in the Republican primary.

South Carolina Senate District 44 Democratic Primary Election, 2020
Party	Candidate	Votes	%
Democratic	Debbie Bryant	5,479	85.6
Democratic	Kris DeLorme	924	14.4
Total votes		6,403	100.0

South Carolina Senate District 44 Republican Primary Election, 2020
Party	Candidate	Votes	%
Republican	Brian Adams	6,318	61.3
Republican	Gayla McSwain	3,983	38.7
Total votes		10,301	100.0

South Carolina Senate District 44 General Election, 2020
Party	Candidate	Votes	%
Republican	Brian Adams	31,472	57.0
Democratic	Debbie Bryant	23,667	42.9
Write-in		61	0.1
Total votes		55,200	100.0
Republican hold			

=== District 45 ===
Incumbent Margie Bright Matthews ran unopposed in the Democratic primary. Rodney Buncum ran unopposed in the Republican primary.

South Carolina Senate District 45 General Election, 2020
Party	Candidate	Votes	%
Democratic	Margie Bright Matthews (incumbent)	28,767	59.4
Republican	Rodney Buncum	19,608	40.5
Write-in		47	0.1
Total votes		48,422	100.0
Democratic hold			

=== District 46 ===
Incumbent Tom Davis ran unopposed in the Republican primary. Nathan Campbell ran unopposed in the Democratic primary.

South Carolina Senate District 46 General Election, 2020
Party	Candidate	Votes	%
Republican	Tom Davis (incumbent)	48,142	65.7
Democratic	Nathan Campbell	25,045	34.2
Write-in		42	0.1
Total votes		73,229	100.0
Republican hold			

== Margins of victory ==
=== Primaries ===
District	Primary	Margin
39	Democratic	2.6%
16	Republican	4.7%
12	Republican	5.6%
33	Republican	5.8%
10	Republican	7.0%
3	Republican	13.6%
44	Republican	22.6%
18	Democratic	24.2%
41	Democratic	26.0%
7	Democratic	30.4%
17	Democratic	35.8%
8	Republican	36.4%
26	Republican	37.6%
7	Democratic	40.2%
5	Republican	40.8%
40	Democratic	42.0%
20	Republican	43.0%
36	Democratic	49.8%
22	Republican	51.6%
30	Democratic	53.4%
32	Democratic	55.2%
25	Republican	57.6%
29	Republican	64.8%
44	Democratic	71.2%

=== Primary Runoffs ===
District	Primary	Margin
16	Republican	9.6%
33	Republican	16.8%
39	Democratic	30.4%

=== General Elections ===
District	Winning party	Margin
41	Republican	1.9%
27	Republican	2.1%
17	Democratic	3.1%
20	Democratic	6.6%
29	Democratic	7.5%
26	Democratic	8.9%
11	Republican	10.8%
10	Republican	12.1%
43	Republican	12.5%
39	Democratic	13.1%
44	Republican	14.1%
36	Democratic	14.9%
38	Republican	17.7%
45	Democratic	18.9%
37	Republican	20.1%
15	Republican	20.4%
32	Democratic	21.3%
22	Democratic	24.4%
7	Republican	25.3%
16	Republican	26.5%
12	Republican	29.9%
6	Republican	30.3%
46	Republican	31.5%
34	Republican	33.5%
25	Republican	39.1%
18	Republican	44.5%
23	Republican	45.1%
4	Republican	45.5%
3	Republican	48.1%
5	Republican	52.3%
14	Republican	68.2%

Uncontested elections are not included.

== See also ==
- 2020 South Carolina elections
- 2020 United States elections
- 2020 South Carolina Democratic presidential primary
- 2020 United States Senate election in South Carolina
- 2020 United States House of Representatives elections in South Carolina
- South Carolina Senate
