= Clarence Turner =

Clarence Turner may refer to:

- Clarence J. A. Turner (1893–1957), American jockey
- Clarence W. Turner (1866–1939), American lawyer, politician
- Clarence Ross Turner (born 1964), American politician and insurance businessman
