= 2014 United States Senate election in South Carolina =

- November 4, 2014
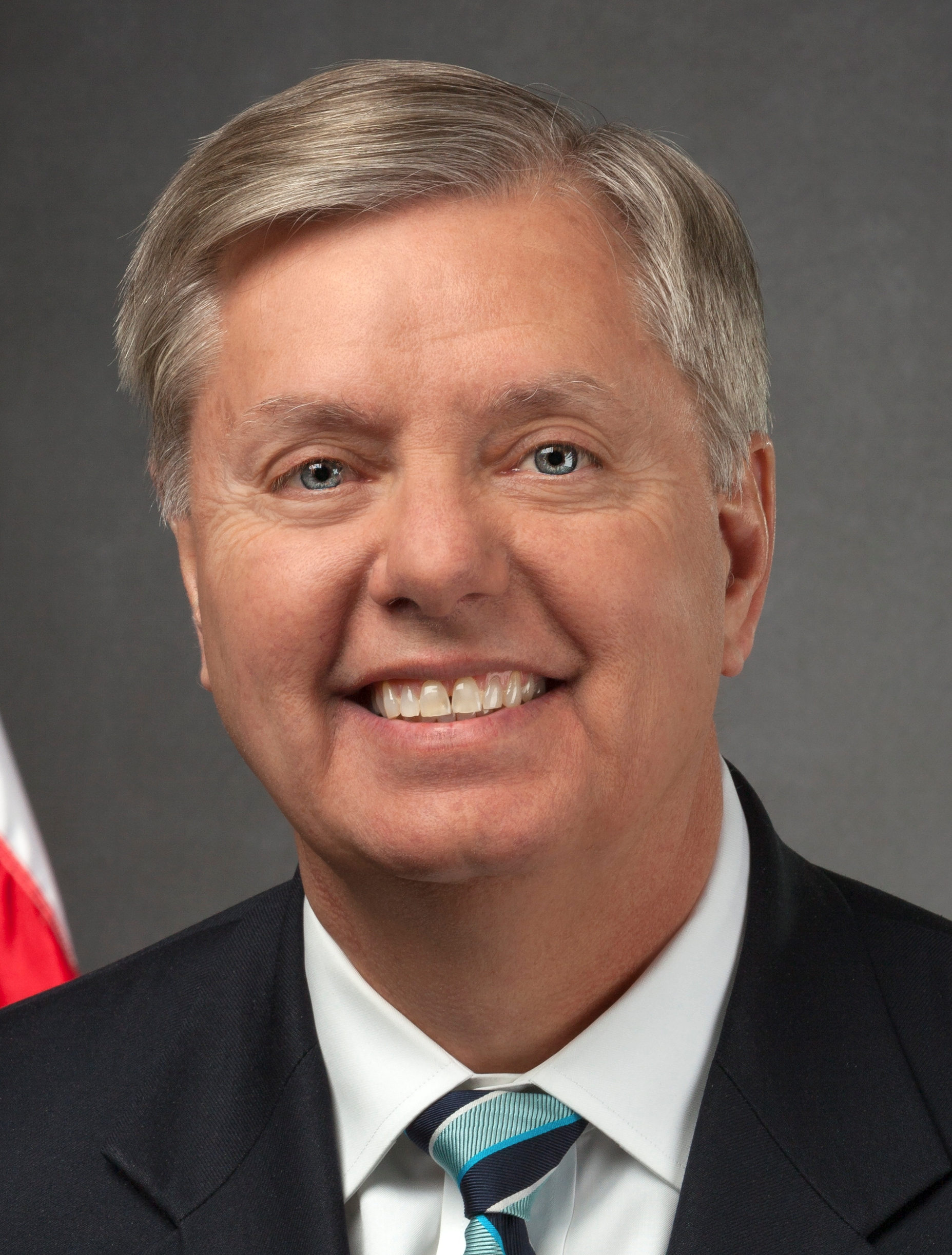

| Nominee | Lindsey Graham | Brad Hutto |
| Party | Republican | Democratic |
| Popular vote | 672,942 | 480,933 |
| Percentage | 54.27% | 38.78% |
- Graham: 40–50% 50–60% 60–70% 70–80% Hutto: 40–50% 50–60% 60–70% 70–80%
U.S. senator before election
Lindsey Graham
Republican
Elected U.S. Senator
Lindsey Graham
Republican

The 2014 United States Senate election in South Carolina took place on November 4, 2014, concurrently with a special election for South Carolina's other Senate seat, as well as other elections to the United States Senate in other states, elections to the United States House of Representatives, and various state and local elections.

Incumbent Republican Lindsey Graham won reelection to a third term. He faced Democratic state senator Brad Hutto and Independent Thomas Ravenel in the general election. He defeated both of them by a 15-point margin.

== Republican primary ==
Of all the Republican senators up for re-election in the 2014 cycle, Graham was considered one of the most vulnerable to a primary challenge, largely due to his low approval ratings and reputation for working with and compromising with Democrats. He expected a primary challenge from conservative activists, including the Tea Party movement, and Chris Chocola, president of the Club for Growth, indicated that his organization would support a primary challenge if an acceptable standard-bearer emerged.

However, a serious challenger to Graham failed to emerge and he was widely viewed as likely to win, which has been ascribed to his "deft maneuvering" and "aggressive" response to the challenge. He befriended potential opponents from the state's congressional delegation and helped them with fundraising and securing their preferred committee assignments; he assembled a "daunting multimillion-dollar political operation" dubbed the "Graham machine" that built six regional offices across the state and enlisted the support of thousands of paid staffers and volunteers, including over 5,000 precinct captains; he assembled a "staggering" campaign warchest and "blanketed" the state with positive ads; he focused on constituent services and local issues; and he refused to "pander" to the Tea Party supporters, instead confronting them head-on, arguing that the Republican party needs to be more inclusive.

=== Candidates ===
==== Declared ====
- Det Bowers, pastor and businessman
- Lee Bright, state senator
- Richard Cash, businessman and candidate for South Carolina's 3rd congressional district in 2010
- Bill Connor, attorney, lieutenant colonel in the United States Army Reserve and candidate for lieutenant governor in 2010
- Benjamin Dunn, attorney
- Lindsey Graham, incumbent U.S. senator
- Nancy Mace, businesswoman and author

==== Withdrew ====
- Dave Feliciano, police officer

==== Declined ====
- Bruce Carroll, co-founder of GOProud and blogger at gay conservative site GayPatriot
- Tom Davis, state senator
- Trey Gowdy, U.S. representative
- Mick Mulvaney, U.S. representative
- Thomas Ravenel, former South Carolina state treasurer (running as an independent)
- Mark Sanford, U.S. representative and former governor of South Carolina
- Joe Wilson, U.S. representative

=== Endorsements ===
Lindsey Graham
- Chris Christie, governor of New Jersey
- Joe Manchin, U.S. senator from West Virginia (Democratic)

Newspapers

- The State
Det Bowers

Individuals

- Curtis Bostic, former Charleston County councilman and candidate for SC-01 in 2013
- Erick Erickson, editor-in-chief of RedState

Organizations

- Sumter TEAvangical Patriots
Lee Bright

Individuals

- Greg Brannon, physician and 2014 North Carolina U.S Senate candidate
- Bill Chumley, state representative
- Thomas Massie, U.S. representative from Kentucky
- William Rentiers, chairman of the Lexington County Republican Party
- Steve Stockman, U.S. representative from Texas
- Kevin Thomas, chairman of the Fairfield County Republican Party
- Lewis Vaughn, former state senator

Organizations

- Americans for Legal Immigration
- Gun Owners of America
- Gun Rights Across America
- Kershaw County Patriots
- Laurens County Tea Party
- National Association for Gun Rights
- Republican Liberty Caucus
- Voice of the Unborn
Bill Connor
- Paul E. Vallely, retired US Army major general and senior military analyst for Fox News
Nancy Mace
- National Association for Gun Rights
- Tea Party Leadership Fund
Declined to endorse
- Tim Scott, U.S. senator from South Carolina

=== Debate ===
2014 U.S. Senate election in South Carolina Republican primary debate
| No. | Date | Host | Moderator | Link | Republican | Republican | Republican | Republican | Republican | Republican | Republican |
| Key: P Participant A Absent N Not invited I Invited W Withdrawn | | | | | | | | | | | |
| Key: P Participant A Absent N Not invited I Invited W Withdrawn | | | | | Det Bowers | Lee Bright | Richard Cash | Bill Connor | Benjamin Dunn | Lindsey Graham | Nancy Mace |
|---|---|---|---|---|---|---|---|---|---|---|---|
| 1 | Jun. 7, 2014 | ETV; The Beaufort Gazette; The Greenville News; The Herald; The Island Packet; The Item; The State; The Sun News | Charles Bierbauer | | P | P | P | P | P | P | P |

=== Polling ===
| Poll source | Date(s) administered | Sample size | Margin of error | Lindsey Graham | Det Bowers | Lee Bright | Richard Cash | Bill Connor | Benjamin Dunn | Nancy Mace | Undecided |
|---|---|---|---|---|---|---|---|---|---|---|---|
| Landmark/Rosetta Stone | August 25, 2013 | 500 | ± 4.5% | 42.4% | — | 12.6% | 6.7% | — | — | 10% | 28.3% |
| Harper Polling | October 27–28, 2013 | 379 | ± 5.03% | 51% | — | 15% | 4% | 4% | — | 4% | 22% |
| Gravis Marketing | November 30 – December 2, 2013 | 601 | ± 4% | 54% | — | 10% | 5% | 2% | — | 6% | 23% |
| North Star^ | January 20–26, 2014 | 600 | ± 4% | 53% | — | 11% | 3% | 3% | — | 8% | 23% |
| Wenzel Strategies* | February 3–4, 2014 | 623 | ± 3.9% | 45.9% | — | 17.4% | 4.9% | 4.2% | — | 5.1% | 22.5% |
| Winthrop University | February 16–23, 2014 | 901 | ± 3.2% | 45% | — | 8.5% | 2.9% | 3.5% | — | 3.7% | 36.5% |
| Gravis Marketing | March 6–7, 2014 | 735 | ± 4% | 60% | — | 10% | 4% | 2% | — | 7% | 17% |
| TargetPoint | March 16–22, 2014 | 600 | ± 2.8% | 56% | 4% | 6% | 7% | 1% | 1% | 5% | 20% |
| Clemson University | May 22–29, 2014 | 400 | ± 6% | 49% | 1% | 9% | 3% | 1% | 0% | 2% | 35% |

- ^ Internal poll for Lindsey Graham campaign
- * Internal poll for Lee Bright campaign
Hypothetical polling

| Poll source | Date(s) administered | Sample size | Margin of error | Lindsey Graham | Tom Davis | Undecided |
|---|---|---|---|---|---|---|
| Public Policy Polling | December 7–9, 2012 | 506 | ± 4.4% | 67% | 17% | 16% |

| Poll source | Date(s) administered | Sample size | Margin of error | Lindsey Graham | Jim DeMint | Undecided |
|---|---|---|---|---|---|---|
| Gravis Marketing | November 30 – December 2, 2013 | 601 | ± 4% | 36% | 47% | 17% |
| Gravis Marketing | March 6–7, 2014 | 735 | ± 4% | 44% | 42% | 14% |

| Poll source | Date(s) administered | Sample size | Margin of error | Lindsey Graham | Trey Gowdy | Undecided |
|---|---|---|---|---|---|---|
| Public Policy Polling | December 7–9, 2012 | 506 | ± 4.4% | 57% | 29% | 14% |

| Poll source | Date(s) administered | Sample size | Margin of error | Lindsey Graham | Mick Mulvaney | Undecided |
|---|---|---|---|---|---|---|
| Public Policy Polling | December 7–9, 2012 | 506 | ± 4.4% | 64% | 20% | 17% |

| Poll source | Date(s) administered | Sample size | Margin of error | Lindsey Graham | Mark Sanford | Undecided |
|---|---|---|---|---|---|---|
| Public Policy Polling | January 28–30, 2011 | 559 | ± 4.1% | 52% | 34% | 14% |
| Public Policy Polling | December 7–9, 2012 | 506 | ± 4.4% | 64% | 26% | 10% |

| Poll source | Date(s) administered | Sample size | Margin of error | Lindsey Graham | Tim Scott | Undecided |
|---|---|---|---|---|---|---|
| Public Policy Polling | December 7–9, 2012 | 506 | ± 4.4% | 54% | 32% | 14% |

| Poll source | Date(s) administered | Sample size | Margin of error | Lindsey Graham | Joe Wilson | Undecided |
|---|---|---|---|---|---|---|
| Public Policy Polling | January 28–30, 2011 | 559 | ± 4.1% | 41% | 43% | 16% |

| Poll source | Date(s) administered | Sample size | Margin of error | Lindsey Graham | Someone more conservative | Undecided |
|---|---|---|---|---|---|---|
| Public Policy Polling | January 28–30, 2011 | 559 | ± 4.1% | 37% | 52% | 11% |
| Public Policy Polling | May 22–23, 2011 | 638 | ± 3.9% | 32% | 57% | 11% |
| Public Policy Polling | December 7–9, 2012 | 506 | ± 4.4% | 51% | 40% | 9% |
| Gravis Marketing | November 30 – December 2, 2013 | 601 | ± 4% | 37% | 39% | 24% |
| Gravis Marketing | March 6–7, 2014 | 735 | ± 4% | 43% | 32% | 25% |

Hypothetical runoff polling

| Poll source | Date(s) administered | Sample size | Margin of error | Lindsey Graham | Lee Bright | Undecided |
|---|---|---|---|---|---|---|
| Landmark/Rosetta Stone | August 25, 2013 | 500 | ± 4.5% | 49.4% | 23.7% | 26.9% |
| North Star^ | January 20–26, 2014 | 600 | ± 4% | 57% | 27% | 16% |

| Poll source | Date(s) administered | Sample size | Margin of error | Lindsey Graham | Richard Cash | Undecided |
|---|---|---|---|---|---|---|
| Landmark/Rosetta Stone | August 25, 2013 | 500 | ± 4.5% | 49.3% | 20.5% | 30.2% |
| North Star^ | January 20–26, 2014 | 600 | ± 4% | 58% | 26% | 16% |

| Poll source | Date(s) administered | Sample size | Margin of error | Lindsey Graham | Bill Connor | Undecided |
|---|---|---|---|---|---|---|
| North Star^ | January 20–26, 2014 | 600 | ± 4% | 59% | 25% | 16% |

| Poll source | Date(s) administered | Sample size | Margin of error | Lindsey Graham | Nancy Mace | Undecided |
|---|---|---|---|---|---|---|
| Landmark/Rosetta Stone | August 25, 2013 | 500 | ± 4.5% | 48.2% | 23.2% | 28.6% |
| North Star^ | January 20–26, 2014 | 600 | ± 4% | 59% | 26% | 15% |

- ^ Internal poll for Lindsey Graham campaign

=== Results ===
2014 Republican primary results 30–40% Graham 40–50% Graham 50–60% Graham 60–70% Graham

Republican primary results
| Party | Candidate | Votes | % |
|---|---|---|---|
| Republican | Lindsey Graham (incumbent) | 178,833 | 56.42% |
| Republican | Lee Bright | 48,904 | 15.53% |
| Republican | Richard Cash | 26,325 | 8.30% |
| Republican | Det Bowers | 23,172 | 7.31% |
| Republican | Nancy Mace | 19,634 | 6.19% |
| Republican | Bill Connor | 16,912 | 5.34% |
| Republican | Benjamin Dunn | 3,209 | 1.01% |
| Total votes | | 316,989 | 100.00% |

== Democratic primary ==
=== Candidates ===
==== Declared ====
- Brad Hutto, state senator
- Jay Stamper, entrepreneur

==== Declined ====
- Jim Hodges, former governor of South Carolina

=== Endorsements ===
Brad Hutto

Individuals

- Jim Clyburn, U.S. representative for (SC-06)
- Jaime Harrison, chairman of the South Carolina Democratic Party

Organizations

- AFL-CIO, national trade union center
- National Education Association, national labor union

Newspapers

- The Greenville News
- The State

=== Polling ===
| Poll source | Date(s) administered | Sample size | Margin of error | Brad Hutto | Jay Stamper | Undecided |
|---|---|---|---|---|---|---|
| Clemson University | May 26 – June 2, 2014 | 400 | ± 6% | 8% | 3% | 89% |

=== Results ===
Democratic primary results
| Party | Candidate | Votes | % |
|---|---|---|---|
| Democratic | Brad Hutto | 87,552 | 76.65% |
| Democratic | Jay Stamper | 26,678 | 23.35% |
| Total votes | | 114,230 | 100.00% |

== Libertarian primary ==
=== Candidates ===
==== Declared ====
- Victor Kocher, nominee for the U.S. Senate in 2002

== Independent ==
In March 2014, with only controversial businessman and prankster Jay Stamper running for the Democrats, Dick Harpootlian, former chairman of the South Carolina Democratic Party, had stated that business leaders were working on an effort to recruit a potential independent candidate to run in case Graham was defeated in the primary. Such a "contingency" plan was rendered moot by the entry of Democratic state senator Brad Hutto into the race.

Former Republican state treasurer Thomas Ravenel had confirmed that was considering running for the Senate as an independent and was likely to do so if Lindsey Graham won the Republican primary. In April 2014, with Graham polling strongly in the primary, Ravenel announced he would run. He officially announced his candidacy on July 4.

=== Declared ===
- Thomas Ravenel, former Republican state treasurer

== General election ==
=== Debates ===
Graham initially declined to debate his opponents. A spokesman said that his campaign was "in discussions with other groups, as well as looking at the schedule." Hutto said that Graham is "terrified at the thought of defending his own record in a public debate" and Ravenel said Graham's decision was "highly arrogant and disrespectful." Graham claimed he refused to debate because of the presence of independent candidate Thomas Ravenel, a convicted felon. He ultimately agreed to debate Hutto alone on October 27.

- Complete video of debate, October 27, 2014

=== Fundraising ===
The following are Federal Election Commission disclosures for the pre-primary reporting period.

| Candidate (party) | Receipts | Disbursements .... | Cash on hand | Debt |
|---|---|---|---|---|
| Lindsey Graham (R) | $7,014,854 | $9,063,768 | $0 | $276,312 |
| Brad Hutto (D) | $399,770 | $342,366 | $132,401 | $75,000 |

=== Predictions ===
| Source | Ranking | As of |
|---|---|---|
| The Cook Political Report | Solid R | November 3, 2014 |
| Sabato's Crystal Ball | Safe R | November 3, 2014 |
| Rothenberg Political Report | Safe R | November 3, 2014 |
| Real Clear Politics | Safe R | November 3, 2014 |

=== Polling ===
| Poll source | Date(s) administered | Sample size | Margin of error | Lindsey Graham (R) | Brad Hutto (D) | Thomas Ravenel (I) | Other | Undecided |
|---|---|---|---|---|---|---|---|---|
| Rasmussen Reports | July 9–10, 2014 | 750 | ± 4% | 49% | 30% | — | 10% | 11% |
| Voter Survey Service | July 7–13, 2014 | 1,000 | ± 4% | 46% | 33% | — | 9% | 12% |
| Voter Survey Service | July 16–20, 2014 | 650 | ± 4% | 45% | 33% | 10% | 4% | 8% |
| Voter Survey Service | July 16–20, 2014 | 650 | ± 4% | 46% | 33% | — | 9% | 12% |
| CBS News/NYT/YouGov | July 5–24, 2014 | 1,183 | ± 5.4% | 48% | 36% | — | 7% | 10% |
| CBS News/NYT/YouGov | August 18 – September 2, 2014 | 833 | ± 5% | 42% | 29% | 8% | 2% | 19% |
| Winthrop University | September 21–28, 2014 | 1,082 | ± 3% | 46.3% | 28% | 8% | 3.5% | 14.3% |
| CBS News/NYT/YouGov | September 20 – October 1, 2014 | 2,663 | ± 2% | 44% | 27% | 8% | 1% | 20% |
| CBS News/NYT/YouGov | October 16–23, 2014 | 1,566 | ± 4% | 43% | 28% | 8% | 2% | 19% |

Hypothetical polling

| Poll source | Date(s) administered | Sample size | Margin of error | Lindsey Graham (R) | Jay Stamper (D) | Undecided |
|---|---|---|---|---|---|---|
| Harper Polling | October 27–28, 2013 | 676 | ± 3.77% | 47% | 30% | 23% |

| Poll source | Date(s) administered | Sample size | Margin of error | Nancy Mace (R) | Jay Stamper (D) | Undecided |
|---|---|---|---|---|---|---|
| Harper Polling | October 27–28, 2013 | 676 | ± 3.77% | 40% | 33% | 27% |

=== Results ===
United States Senate election in South Carolina, 2014
| Party | Candidate | Votes | % | ±% |
|---|---|---|---|---|
| Republican | Lindsey Graham (incumbent) | 672,941 | 54.27% | −3.25% |
| Democratic | Brad Hutto | 480,933 | 38.78% | −3.47% |
| Independent | Thomas Ravenel | 47,588 | 3.84% | N/A |
| Libertarian | Victor Kocher | 33,839 | 2.73% | N/A |
| Write-in | | 4,774 | 0.38% | +0.15% |
| Total votes | | 1,240,075 | 100.00% | N/A |
| Republican hold | | | | |

==== Counties that flipped from Republican to Democratic ====
- Barnwell (largest town: Barnwell)
- Calhoun (largest town: St. Matthews)
- Darlington (largest city: Hartsville)
- Dillon (largest city: Dillon)

==== Counties that flipped from Democratic to Republican ====
- Chester (largest town: Chester)
- McCormick (largest town: McCormick)

== See also ==
- 2014 United States Senate special election in South Carolina
- 2014 South Carolina gubernatorial election
- 2014 United States House of Representatives elections in South Carolina
- 2014 United States Senate elections
- 2014 United States elections
