= Richard Cash =

Richard Cash may refer to:

- Richard Cash (politician), member of the South Carolina Senate
- Richard A. Cash, American global health researcher
- Rick Cash, American football defensive lineman
