= Dick Harpootlian =

American attorney and politician (born 1949)

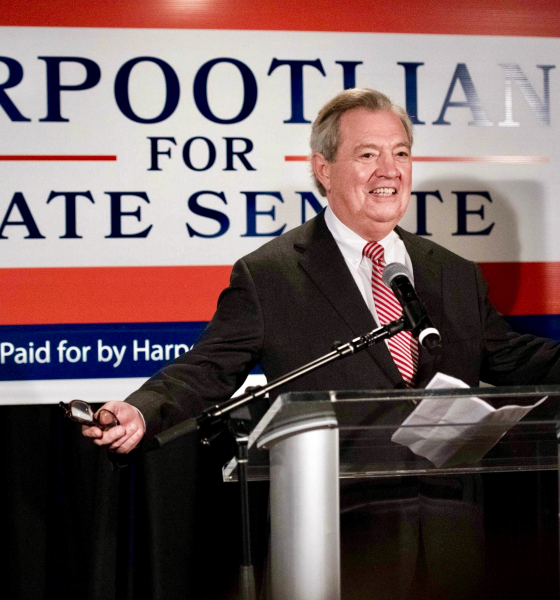

Member of the South Carolina Senate from the 20th district
- In office November 14, 2018 – December 2024
- Preceded by: John Courson
- Succeeded by: Ed Sutton

Chair of the South Carolina Democratic Party
- In office 2011–2013
- Preceded by: Carol Fowler
- Succeeded by: Jaime Harrison
- In office 1998–2003
- Preceded by: Ronnie Maxwell
- Succeeded by: Joe Erwin

Solicitor for the Fifth Judicial Circuit of South Carolina
- In office 1991–1995
- Preceded by: James Anders
- Succeeded by: Warren "Barney" Giese

Personal details
- Born: January 23, 1949 (age 77) New York City, U.S.
- Party: Democratic
- Spouse: Jamie Lindler Harpootlian
- Children: 1
- Education: Clemson University (BA); University of South Carolina (JD)
- Website: https://www.harpootlianlaw.com/

Richard A. "Dick" Harpootlian (born January 23, 1949) is an American attorney and politician who served as a member of the South Carolina Senate from the 20th district from 2018 to 2024. He served as the chair of the South Carolina Democratic Party from 1998 to 2003 and again from 2011 to 2013. He also previously served as solicitor (district attorney) for the Fifth Judicial Circuit of South Carolina from 1991 until 1995.

As a member of the South Carolina Senate, Harpootlian had been a frequent critic of the state's budgetary practices. He served as a member of the Senate Judiciary Committee.

In private practice, Harpootlian has served as a lead attorney for Alex Murdaugh in his murder trial, appeals, and motions for a new trial.

== Early life, education and career ==
Richard Harpootlian was born in 1949 to Jody (née Williams) and Harold Harpootlian. He is of Armenian descent; his grandparents immigrated to the United States after fleeing their hometown of Harpoot (present-day Turkey) in the Ottoman Empire during the Armenian genocide. He earned a Bachelor of Arts degree from Clemson University and a Juris Doctor from the University of South Carolina School of Law.

=== Legal work ===
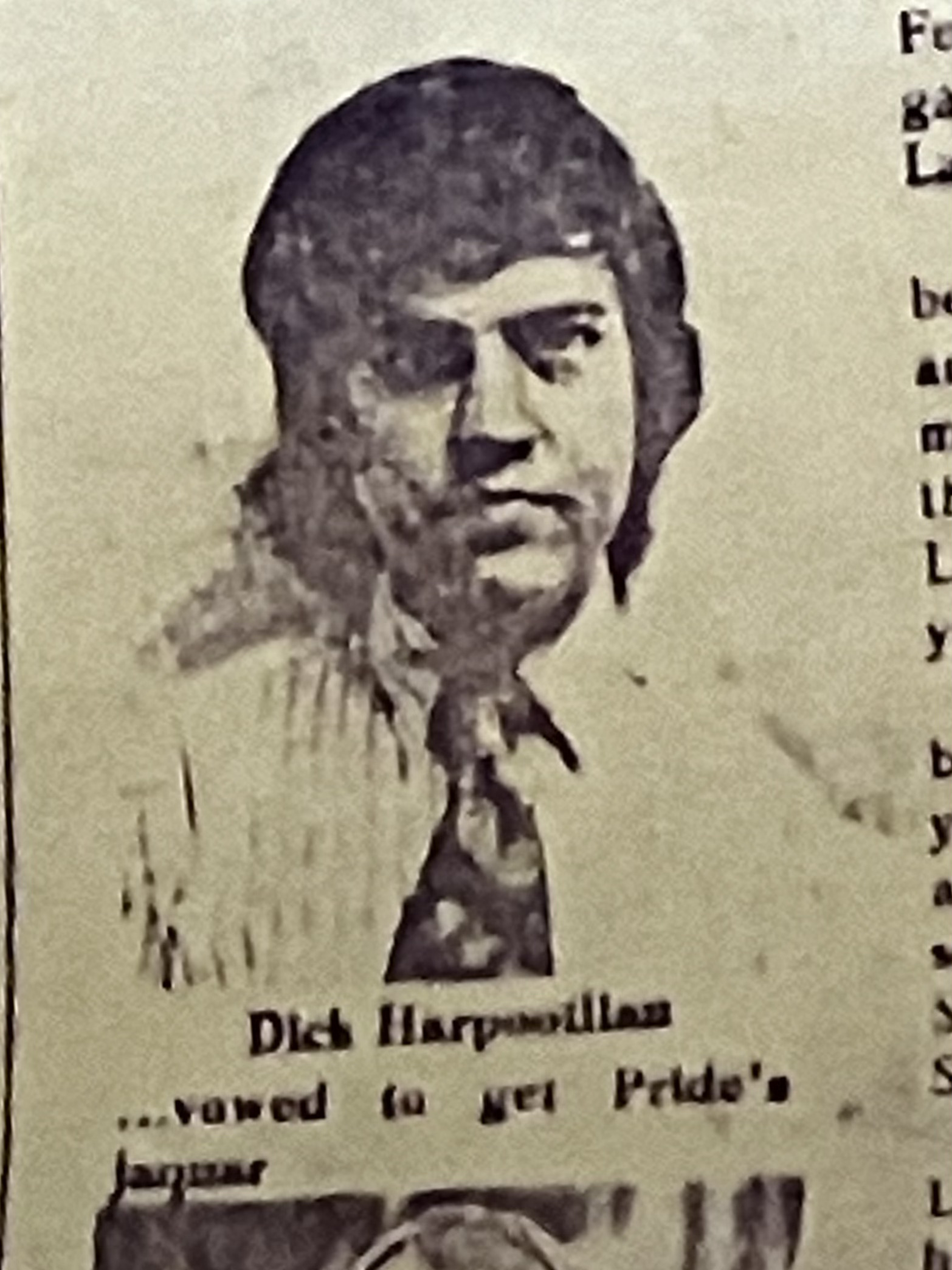
Harpootlian in the July 10, 1976 issue of "Black On News"

Harpootlian's law firm has represented neighborhoods near Five Points in Columbia, a popular weekend location for college students, in protestations against liquor licenses in the area. Several bars in the area have made agreements with the state to change their procedures as a result of the liquor license protests. As a result of Harpootlian's work, one bar was forced to close down.

==== Murdaugh trial ====
Harpootlian and Jim Griffin represent former attorney Alex Murdaugh, who had been charged with more than 90 counts of breach of trust with fraudulent intent, computer crimes, money laundering and forgery. Murdaugh was convicted of murdering his young son Paul and wife Maggie and was sentenced to two life sentences, after a six-week long trial.

On December 11, 2024, Harpootlian and Griffin filed a South Carolina Supreme Court appeal of the double murder conviction.

==== Written works ====
In April 2025, Harpootlian announced the publication of Dig Me a Grave: The Inside Story of the Serial Killer Who Seduced the South (ISBN 9780806542904), his novel on serial killer Donald Henry Gaskins, also known as "Pee Wee" Gaskins. Co-written with Shaun Assael, the book became available at the end of 2025.

=== Legislative lawsuit ===
On June 9, 2025, Harpootlian represented South Carolina Senator Wes Climer in a lawsuit against the state of South Carolina over their vote in the 2025 state budget to give themselves pay raises. He and Climer argue that the action violates the State constitution. Climer declined the additional money, as did 2 other members of the Senate and 34 members of the South Carolina House of Representatives.

== Political career ==
=== Fifth Circuit Solicitor ===
Harpootlian was elected solicitor for the Fifth Judicial Circuit of South Carolina, serving from 1991 until 1995. During that time, Harpootlian prosecuted Pee Wee Gaskins and University of South Carolina President Jim Holderman.

=== 1994 South Carolina Attorney General race ===
Harpootlian ran for attorney general of South Carolina in 1994 losing to Charlie Condon in the general election. He served as the chair of the South Carolina Democratic Party twice. He is credited with the party's decision to move the South Carolina primary earlier in the primary schedule.

=== South Carolina Senate ===
On June 4, 2018, John E. Courson resigned his senate seat after pleading guilty to mishandling campaign funds. Courson's resignation was related to the South Carolina Statehouse corruption investigation led by David Pascoe which found multiple instances of wrongdoing in the South Carolina General Assembly. In November 2018, Harpootlian defeated Benjamin Dunn in a special election for Courson's old senate seat. It was the first time in 14 years a Democrat flipped a Republican-held Senate seat.

- 2020 South Carolina Senate election: In 2020, Harpootlian faced repeat challenger Benjamin Dunn, defeating him for a second time.
- 2024 South Carolina Senate election: In 2021, redistricting plans for the South Carolina Senate moved Harpootlian's district in Richland County to Charleston County on the coast. On January 11, 2024, Harpootlian announced his candidacy for State Senate District 26 seat, currently held by incumbent Senator Nikki G. Setzler, who is not running for re-election. State Representative Russell Ott announced for the seat in February 2024. The primary race between Harpootlian and Ott has generated headlines. Harpootlian was endorsed by Congressman Jim Clyburn and Former State Representative Bakari Sellers. Ott was endorsed by St. Matthews Mayor Helen Carson-Peterson. In the preliminary results for the 2024 Democratic primary, Harpootlian lost to Ott by 2 points.

== Recognition ==
Harpootlian ranked number 29 on the Post and Courier Columbia's 2025 Power List.

=== Tenure ===
Since joining the Senate, Harpootlian has been critical of the University of South Carolina's hiring practices and legislation giving the Carolina Panthers tax incentives to move their headquarters to Rock Hill, South Carolina. In May 2019, Harpootlian commissioned his own independent analysis on the economic benefits of moving the Panthers headquarters to Rock Hill. The report found that the added jobs to the area were a third of what the state of South Carolina's review found. Harpootlian stalled the Senate vote on the measure although it later passed.

In November 2019, Harpootlian was criticized for profanely threatening to have an aide of the Richland County Legislation Delegation fired over a press release which failed to include job openings at the Columbia airport. In December 2019 he called the university's search for the president's next chief of staff "cronyism at its finest." Harpootlian came out against a bill in the senate which would legalize curbside pickup for alcohol products in January 2020. And in December of that year Harpootlian raised concerns about $43 million in untracked earmarks which attracted statewide coverage.

In March 2021, Harpootlian proposed that South Carolina permit the use of firing squads as an alternative method of capital punishment in South Carolina. Harpootlian said that while he "abhorred" and "resisted" the death penalty, his work as a prosecutor trying the serial killer Donald Henry Gaskins led to him opposing the electric chair as a "horrible, horrible thing to do to another human being." He worked with Republican State Senator Greg Hembree to propose that a bill allowing the use of electrocution also allow the condemned to choose between that option and firing squads. Harpootlian said that "the death penalty is going to stay the law here for a while. If we’re going to have it, it ought to be humane... This was a desperation move on my part to minimize the pain and suffering of the condemned."

=== Endorsements ===
During the 2016 Democratic Party presidential primaries, Harpootlian stated that he was a "Joe Biden guy." He endorsed Bernie Sanders for president on February 3, 2016, comparing Sanders' passion with the kind Obama exuded in 2007 when they had first met." In 2020, Harpootlian endorsed Joe Biden for president, stating "If the Democratic Party believes nominating a socialist is the way to win in November, they need to start drug testing at the national committee" in reference to Sanders.

== Controversies ==
In September 2012, Harpootlian drew controversy when he compared then-governor Nikki Haley to Eva Braun, the mistress of Adolf Hitler. The remarks were condemned by Norm Coleman, the chair of the Jewish coalition of Mitt Romney's presidential campaign, who accused him of "trivializing Nazism". Harpootlian drew further controversy in 2013 for remarks he made at the annual Jackson-Jefferson dinner of the state Democratic Party, where he said that they needed to "send Nikki Haley back to wherever the hell she came from"; Haley is Indian-American with Sikh heritage, and her parents immigrated from India. A Haley campaign spokeswoman criticized the remarks as targeting her ethnicity. Harpootlian's remarks were condemned as racist or xenophobic by Indian news outlets India Today, Firstpost, and Outlook. Harpootlian later apologized, claiming that he did not intend to target her ethnicity and that he wanted her to "go back to being an accountant in a dress store rather than being this fraud of a governor that we have".

On February 5, 2020, Harpootlian tweeted that South Carolina Legislative Black Caucus Chairman Jerry Govan Jr., received "almost $50,000" from the Tom Steyer Presidential campaign for campaign services. Harpootlian referred to Steyer as "Mr. Moneybags" and suggested that he had purchased Govan's support. Later that day, members of the South Carolina Legislative Black Caucus held a press conference asking Biden to distance himself from Harpootlian. Later that day, Steyer accused Harpootlian of having "a horrid track record of disrespecting and disparaging African Americans." Steyer also asked Biden to disavow Dick Harpootlian and what he said during a 2020 Democratic Party presidential debate in New Hampshire. Harpootlian denied that his comments were racially motivated, State Sen. Marlon Kimpson, a Legislative Black Caucus member, noted that the press conference was not held by the caucus itself, but by Govan and his supporters; some caucus members, including Kimpson, did not participate. Kimpson, a Biden supporter, characterized the controversy as an outgrowth of personal feuds between state lawmakers.

== Personal life ==
His wife, Jamie Lindler Harpootlian, served as the ambassador of the United States to the Republic of Slovenia.

Party political offices
Preceded by Thomas T. Medlock	Democratic nominee for Attorney General of South Carolina; 1994	Succeeded by Tom Turnipseed
South Carolina Senate
Preceded by John Courson	Member of the South Carolina Senate from the 20th district 2018–present	Incumbent
