= Norma C. Russell =

American politician (1937–2026)

Norma Caldwell Russell

Member of the South Carolina State Senate for the 8th district
- In office 1981–1983
- Preceded by: Tom Turnipseed
- Succeeded by: David L. Thomas

Member of the South Carolina House of Representatives for the 90th district
- In office 1972–1980

Personal details
- Born: August 23, 1937 near Joanna, South Carolina, U.S.
- Died: March 6, 2026 (aged 88)
- Party: Republican
- Spouse: Rodney J. Russell

Norma Caldwell Russell (August 23, 1937 – March 6, 2026) was an American politician in the state of South Carolina.

== Early life and career ==
Russell was a freelance court reporter.

== Political career ==
Russell served in the South Carolina Senate from 1981 to 1983. She served in the South Carolina House of Representatives as a member of the Republican Party from 1972 to 1980, representing Lexington County, South Carolina.

She was elected Senator of the Year in 1982.

== Issues ==
=== Equal Rights Amendment ===
Russell politely responded by letter to a supporter of the Equal Rights Amendment, stating her reasons for refusing to endorse.

== Death ==
Russell died on March 6, 2026, at the age of 88.

Party political offices
Preceded by John Stroud	Republican nominee for Lieutenant Governor of South Carolina; 1982	Succeeded by Thomas F. Hartnett
