= Dwight Loftis =

American politician

Member of the South Carolina Senate from the 6th district
- In office March 27, 2019 – December 2024
- Preceded by: William Timmons
- Succeeded by: Jason Elliott

Member of the South Carolina House of Representatives from the 19th district
- In office January 24, 1996 – March 27, 2019
- Preceded by: Mike Fair
- Succeeded by: Patrick Haddon

Personal details
- Born: February 4, 1943 (age 83) Greenville County, South Carolina, U.S.
- Party: Republican
- Spouse: Sandra Elaine Jones (m. 1963)
- Children: 3
- Education: North Greenville University (AA, 1966)
- Profession: Insurance agent, politician

Dwight A. Loftis (born February 4, 1943) is a retired American politician and insurance agent from South Carolina. A member of the South Carolina Senate from 2019 to 2024, he previously represented district 19 in the South Carolina House of Representatives for 23 years from 1996 to 2019. He is a member of the Republican party.

== S.C. House of Representatives (1996–2019) ==
From 1996 to 2019, Loftis represented district 19 in the South Carolina House of Representatives. His entry to the office was upon winning a January 1996 special election.

== S.C. Senate ==
From 2019 to 2024, Loftis represented South Carolina's 6th Senate District (a portion of Greenville County). He was first elected during a special election when incumbent William Timmons succeeded Trey Gowdy in representing South Carolina's 4th Congressional district in the U.S. House of Representatives. In 2023, Loftis announced he would retire and not seek reelection.

== Political views ==
Loftis opposes gay marriage and strongly supports marriage as defined between a man and woman. He voted to keep the Confederate Flag flying above the South Carolina Statehouse. He is a strong supporter of "law and order," the second amendment, and South Carolina's "heartbeat bill," restricting abortion after six-weeks.

== Personal life ==
Loftis resides in Greenville, South Carolina with his wife Sandra. They have three children. Loftis first obtained an Associate degree from North Greenville University (then, North Greenville College) in 1966. He was an insurance agent, but has since retired.

Loftis has been an active member of the Greenville community, particularly on issues of crime and education. He is a board member and past president of the Crime Stoppers of Greenville, and has held positions such as:

- Past chairman of the North West Business Education Partnership School District of Greenville
- Past member of the Leadership Council School District in Greenville County
- Former Greenville County School Trustee

== Electoral history ==
| Year | Office | Type | Party | Main opponent | Party | Votes for Loftis | | | | Result | Swing | Ref. |
| Year | Office | Type | Party | Main opponent | Party | Total | % | P. | ±% | Result | Swing | Ref. |
|---|---|---|---|---|---|---|---|---|---|---|---|---|
| 1996 | S.C. Representative | Special | Republican | Johnnie S. Fulton | Democratic | 1,423 | 51.35% | 1st | N/A | Won | Hold | |
| 1996 | S.C. Representative | General | Republican | Johnnie S. Fulton | Democratic | 4,992 | 56.48% | 1st | N/A | Won | Hold | |
| 1998 | S.C. Representative | General | Republican | Write-in | N/A | 6,224 | 97.69% | 1st | +41.21% | Won | Hold | |
| 2000 | S.C. Representative | General | Republican | Debbie Hill | Democratic | 6,126 | 66.02% | 1st | -31.67% | Won | Hold | |
| 2002 | S.C. Representative | General | Republican | Write-in | N/A | 6,441 | 97.80% | 1st | +31.78% | Won | Hold | |
| 2004 | S.C. Representative | General | Republican | Luanne M. Taylor | Democratic | 7,746 | 72.14% | 1st | -25.66% | Won | Hold | |
| 2006 | S.C. Representative | General | Republican | Write-in | N/A | 5,991 | 98.89% | 1st | +26.75% | Won | Hold | |
| 2008 | S.C. Representative | General | Republican | Write-in | N/A | 9,205 | 98.58% | 1st | -0.31% | Won | Hold | |
| 2010 | S.C. Representative | General | Republican | Write-in | N/A | 6,467 | 98.60% | 1st | +0.02% | Won | Hold | |
| 2012 | S.C. Representative | General | Republican | Write-in | N/A | 9,213 | 97.90% | 1st | -0.70% | Won | Hold | |
| 2014 | S.C. Representative | General | Republican | Write-in | N/A | 6,492 | 98.62% | 1st | +0.72% | Won | Hold | |
| 2016 | S.C. Representative | General | Republican | Write-in | N/A | 10,379 | 98.56% | 1st | -0.06% | Won | Hold | |
| 2018 | S.C. Representative | General | Republican | Carrie Counton | Democratic | 6,744 | 61.16% | 1st | -37.40% | Won | Hold | |
| 2019 | S.C. Senate | Rep. primary | Republican | Amy Ryberg Doyle | Republican | 3,528 | 55.41% | 1st | N/A | Won | N/A | |
| 2019 | S.C. Senate | Special | Republican | Tina Belge | Democratic | 4,440 | 55.64% | 1st | N/A | Won | Hold | |
| 2020 | S.C. Senate | General | Republican | Hao Wu | Democratic | 33,300 | 65.13% | 1st | N/A | Won | Hold | |

== Awards and honors ==
Governor Henry McMaster presented the Order of the Palmetto to Loftis at the December 2, 2024, Greenville County Legislative Delegation meeting.

South Carolina House of Representatives
| Preceded by Mike Fair | Member of the South Carolina House of Representatives from the 19th district 1996–2019 | Succeeded by Patrick Haddon |
South Carolina Senate
| Preceded by William Timmons | Member of the South Carolina Senate from the 6th district 2019–2024 | Incumbent |
