= Jason Elliott (politician) =

American politician from South Carolina

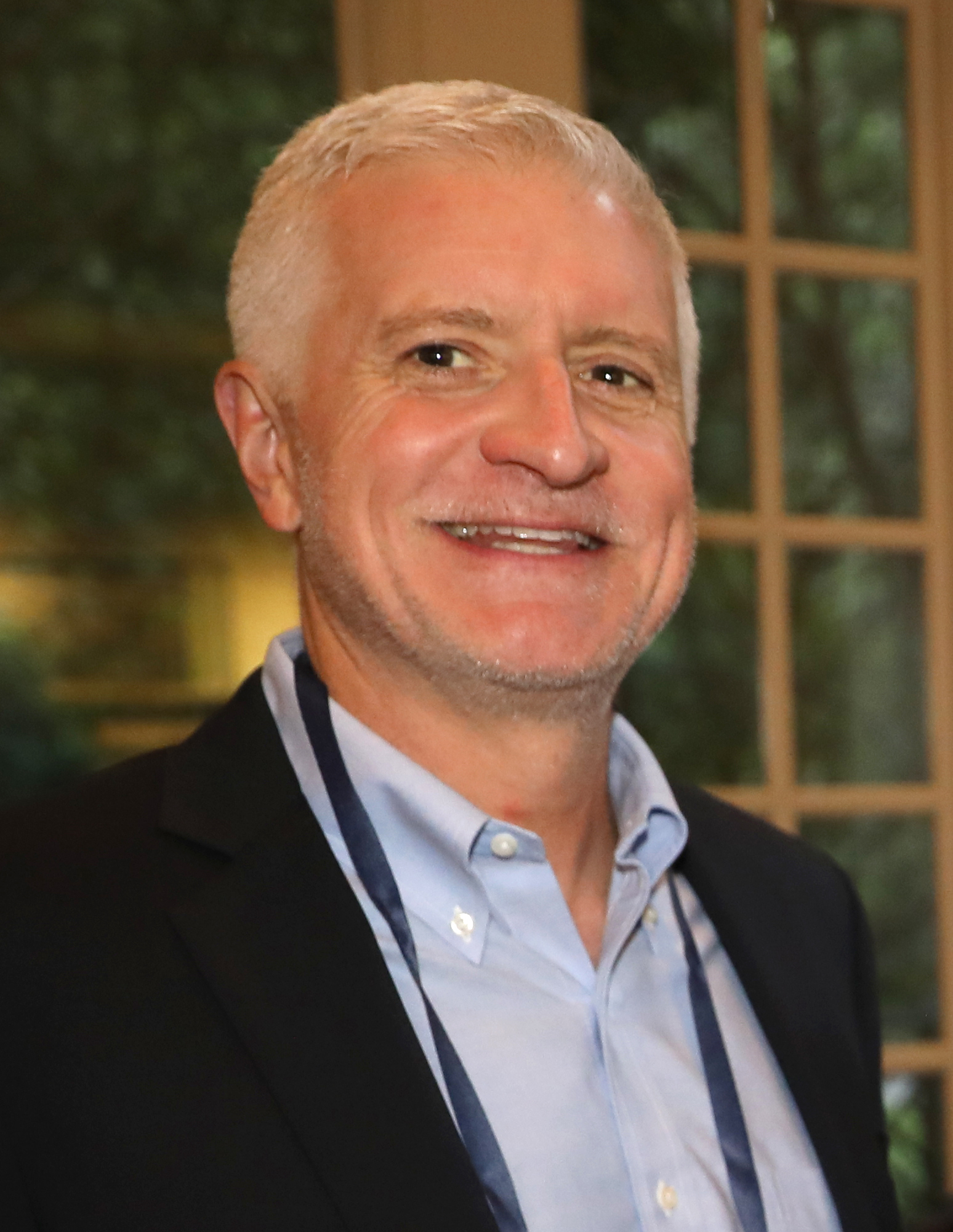

Member of the South Carolina Senate from the 6th district
- Incumbent
- Assumed office November 2024
- Preceded by: Dwight Loftis

Member of the South Carolina House of Representatives
- In office November 2016 – November 2024
- Preceded by: Wendy Nanney
- Succeeded by: Paul Wickensimer

Personal details
- Born: Jason Elliott; July 1, 1970 (age 56) Greenville, South Carolina, U.S.
- Party: Republican
- Education: Clemson University (BA) University of South Carolina (JD)

Jason Elliott is a member of the South Carolina Senate, representing District 6. He is a Republican.

== Political career ==
=== 2024 State Senate race ===
In January 2024, Elliott announced his run for the South Carolina Senate seat, to be vacated by retiring incumbent Senator Dwight Loftis. Elliot faced 2 opponents in the Republican primary. On June 25, 2024, he won the runoff, defeating Ben Carper. Elliot did not face an opponent in the general election, and won the senate seat in November. He was succeeded in the House seat by Paul Wickensimer.

=== 2016 State House race ===
Elliott was elected to the 22nd District of South Carolina House of Representatives in 2016. He served on the Education and Public Works Committee, where he chaired the Motor Vehicle Subcommittee. Elliott is the first openly gay man to be elected to the South Carolina General Assembly.

== Electoral history ==
=== 2016 ===
South Carolina State House of Representatives District 22 Republican Primary 2016
| Party | Candidate | Votes | % |
|---|---|---|---|
| Republican | Jason Elliott | 2,653 | 58.23% |
| Republican | Wendy Nanney (incumbent) | 1,903 | 41.77% |
| Total votes | | 4,556 | 100.0% |

South Carolina State House of Representatives District 22 General Election 2016
| Party | Candidate | Votes | % |
|---|---|---|---|
| Republican | Jason Elliott | 13,029 | 84.37% |
| Write-in | Write-in | 2,413 | 15.63% |
| Total votes | | 15,442 | 100.0% |

=== 2018 ===
South Carolina State House of Representatives District 22 Republican Primary 2018
| Party | Candidate | Votes | % |
|---|---|---|---|
| Republican | Jason Elliott (incumbent) | 3,030 | 58.34% |
| Republican | Brett Brocato | 1,874 | 36.08% |
| Republican | Samuel Harms | 290 | 5.58% |
| Total votes | | 5,194 | 100.0% |

South Carolina State House of Representatives District 22 General Election 2018
| Party | Candidate | Votes | % |
|---|---|---|---|
| Republican | Jason Elliott (incumbent) | 9,955 | 63.35% |
| Democratic | B K Brown | 5,673 | 36.10% |
| Write-in | Write-in | 86 | .55% |
| Total votes | | 15,714 | 100.0% |

=== 2020 ===
South Carolina State House of Representatives District 22 General Election 2020
| Party | Candidate | Votes | % |
|---|---|---|---|
| Republican | Jason Elliott (incumbent) | 13,542 | 63.41% |
| Democratic | B K Brown | 7,750 | 36.29% |
| Write-in | Write-in | 63 | .30% |
| Total votes | | 21,355 | 100.0% |

==== Tenure ====
South Carolina's 6th District, following redistricting after the 2020 US Census:

2020 Census Redistricting

All S.C. State Senate Districts, following the redistricting after the 2020 Census.

South Carolina State Senate District 6 consists of a cross-section of Greenville County.
