= Michael Johnson (South Carolina politician) =

American politician

Member of the South Carolina Senate from the 16th district
- Incumbent
- Assumed office November 9, 2020
- Preceded by: Greg Gregory

Personal details
- Born: November 22, 1970 (age 55) Fort Walton Beach, Florida
- Party: Republican
- Spouse: Amy E. Johnson (m. 2026)
- Children: 2
- Education: Auburn University (BA, 1993); University of South Carolina School of Law (JD, 1996)
- Profession: Attorney, politician

Michael Johnson is an American politician from the South Carolina Republican Party. Johnson was elected to the South Carolina Senate in the 2020 election to serve the 16th Senate District (Lancaster and York counties). He was reelected in 2024.

== S.C. Senate ==
Johnson has represented South Carolina's 16th Senate District since 2020. He won the seat after longtime SC Senator Greg Gregory announced his retirement in 2019, opening up the seat for the first time since 2011. Johnson serves on the Agriculture and Natural Resource, Education, Judiciary, Labor Commerce and Industry, and Rules Committees.

He was awarded the 2024 W. Mack Chamblee Quality of Life Award by the South Carolina Realtors. In July 2025 Senator Johnson was named the Legislator of the Year by the South Carolina Poultry Federation.

== Electoral history ==
Year	Office	Type	Party	Main opponent	Party	Votes for Climer				Result	Swing	Ref.
Year	Office	Type	Party	Main opponent	Party	Total	%	P.	±%	Result	Swing	Ref.
2020	S.C. Senator	Rep. primary	Republican	Tom Nichols	Republican	3,583	27.16%	2nd	N/A	Runoff	N/A	
2020	S.C. Senator	Rep. primary runoff	Republican	Tom Nichols	Republican	4,701	54.82%	1st	N/A	Won	N/A	
2020	S.C. Senator	General	Republican	Ram Mammadov	Democratic	48,801	63.25%	1st	N/A	Won	Hold	

South Carolina Senate
Preceded by Greg Gregory	Member of the South Carolina Senate from the 16th district 2020–present	Incumbent
