= Danny Verdin =

American politician from South Carolina

Daniel B. Verdin III
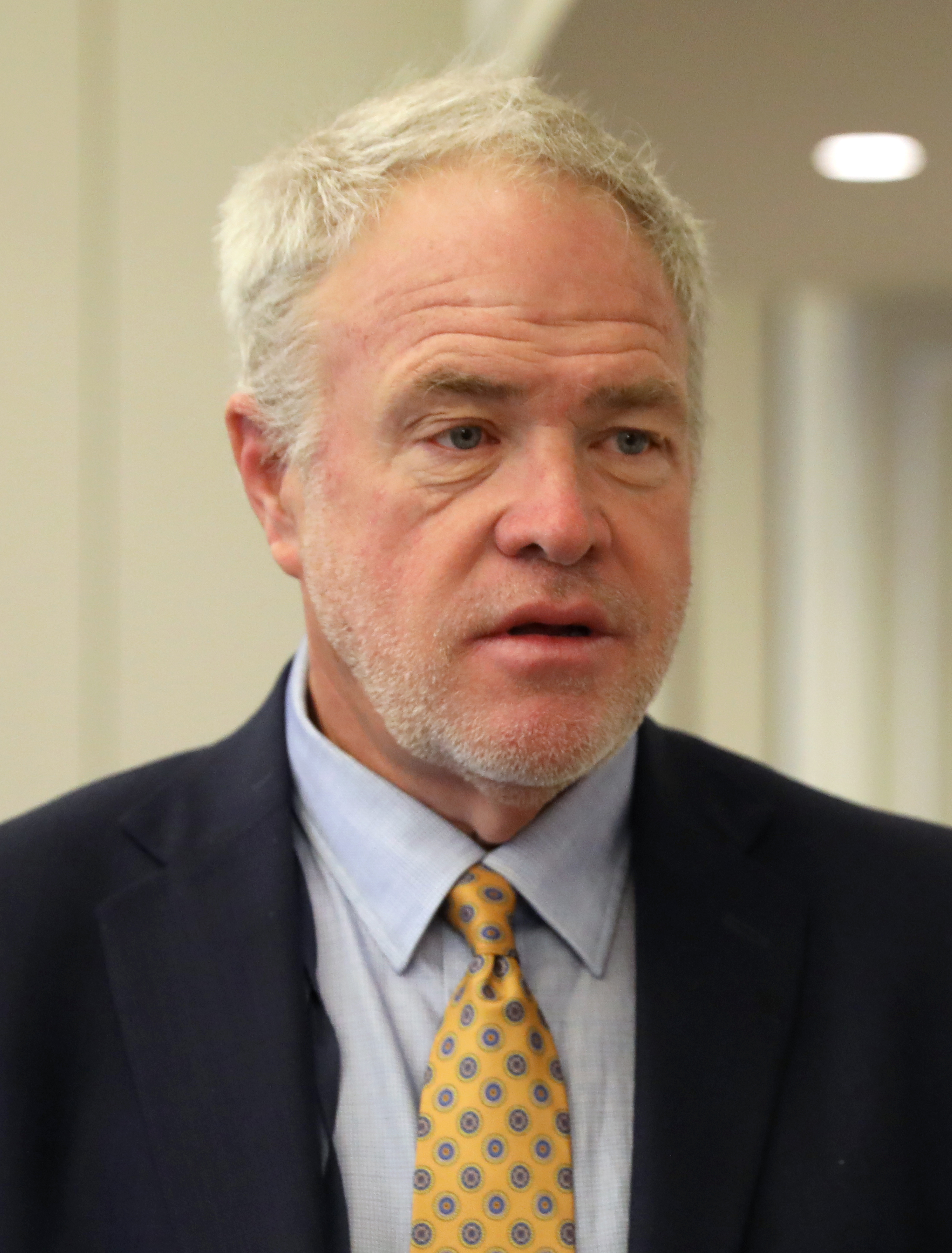

Member of the South Carolina Senate from the 9th district
- Incumbent
- Assumed office 2001
- Preceded by: James Edward Bryan, Jr.

Personal details
- Born: May 9, 1964 (age 62) England Air Force Base in Alexandria, Louisiana
- Party: Republican
- Spouse: Kimberlee Owens (m. 1987)
- Children: 4
- Education: Bob Jones University (BA, 1986)
- Profession: Business owner, politician

Daniel Byron "Danny" Verdin III (born May 9, 1964) is a member of the South Carolina Senate, representing District 9 (Greenville, Laurens, and Union Counties). In November 2008, he was chosen as majority whip, serving until 2013.

== Personal life and early career ==
Verdin is the son of Dr. Daniel B. Verdin, Jr. and Eloise Watts Verdin. He was born in Alexandria, Louisiana, but raised in Greenville County, where his father was a veterinarian. In 1986, Verdin graduated with a bachelor's degree in history from Bob Jones University. In 1987, Verdin married Kimberlee Owens; they have four children.

Verdin served as Agriculture and Natural Resources Advisor to Governor Carroll Campbell, 1987–89. He is the owner of Verdin's Farm & Garden Center in Laurens, South Carolina. Verdin is a member of Faith Free Presbyterian Church in Greenville, and he has served as South Carolina Division Commander of the Sons of Confederate Veterans, 1998–2000.

== S.C. Senate ==
In 2000, Verdin ran for the District 9 South Carolina Senate seat as a conservative Republican and defeated a 16-year Democratic incumbent, Jim Bryan, in an upset election. Verdin's election shifted the balance of power in the South Carolina Senate by creating a 23–23 tie between Republicans and Democrats.

Anticipating that the Senate rules would be re-written to favor Republicans and that Republican Senate President (and Lieutenant Governor) Bob Peeler would break the tie in the Republicans' favor, long-time Democratic Senator Jefferson Verne Smith (Greenville) switched his party affiliation to Republican in order to retain his powerful committee chairmanship. This switch resulted in the end of more than a century of Democratic control of the South Carolina Senate.

Since 2018, Verdin has served as the Chairman of the Senate Medical Affairs Committee.

In 2006, the South Carolina Farm Bureau named Verdin Legislator of the Year; and in 2007, Verdin was named Legislator of the Year by the South Carolina Veterinarians Association. Verdin has been consistently rated A+ by the NRA Political Victory Fund. In announcing Verdin's selection as majority whip in 2008, Majority Leader Harvey Peeler said that in the current political environment, the Republican caucus needed "to return to core conservative values".

Following the Charleston church shooting of 2015, Verdin said he would not vote to remove the Confederate battle flag from the grounds of the state house.

== Electoral history ==
Year	Office	Type	Party	Main opponent	Party	Votes for Verdin				Result	Swing	Ref.
Year	Office	Type	Party	Main opponent	Party	Total	%	P.	±%	Result	Swing	Ref.
2000	S.C. Senate	General	Republican	James Edward Bryan, Jr. (Note: Incumbent seeking re-election.)	Democratic	16,793	54.46%	1st	N/A	Won	Gain	
2004	S.C. Senate	General	Republican	James Edward Bryan, Jr.	Democratic	19,402	60.04%	1st	+5.58%	Won	Hold	
2008	S.C. Senate	General	Republican	Write-in	N/A	27,405	99.04%	1st	+39.00%	Won	Hold	
2012	S.C. Senate	General	Republican	Write-in	N/A	27,931	98.91%	1st	-0.13%	Won	Hold	
2016	S.C. Senate	General	Republican	Write-in	N/A	32,168	98.85%	1st	-0.06%	Won	Hold	
2020	S.C. Senate	General	Republican	Write-in	N/A	39,049	96.95%	1st	-1.90%	Won	Hold	
2024	S.C. Senate	General	Republican	C. Randy Driggers	Democratic	38,275	70.24%	1st	-26.71%	Won	Hold	

== Notes ==
South Carolina Senate
Preceded by James Edward Bryan, Jr.	Member of the South Carolina Senate from the 9th district 2001–present	Incumbent
