= 2010 United States House of Representatives elections in South Carolina =

- November 2, 2010

All 6 South Carolina seats to the United States House of Representatives
	Majority party	Minority party
Party	Republican	Democratic
Last election	4	2
Seats won	5	1
Seat change	▲1	▼1
Popular vote	753,932	543,921
Percentage	56.21%	40.55%
Swing	▲6.06%	▼8.52%

Republican
50–60%
60–70%
Democratic
50–60%
60–70%
70–80%
Winners
Republican hold
Republican gain
Democratic hold

The 2010 United States House of Representatives elections in South Carolina were held on Tuesday, November 2, 2010. The primary elections were held on June 8. The composition of the state delegation before the election was four Republicans and two Democrats.

After the general election, the composition of the state delegation entering the 112th Congress was five Republicans and just one Democrat.

== Overview ==
United States House of Representatives elections in South Carolina, 2010
Party	Votes	Percentage	Seats before	Seats after	+/–
Republican	753,932	56.21%	4	5	+1
Democratic	543,921	40.55%	2	1	-1
Constitution	16,597	1.23%	0	0	0
Libertarian	9,988	0.74%	0	0	0
Green	7,322	0.65%	0	0	0
Other	9,376	0.74%	0	0	0
Totals	1,341,136	100.00%	6	6	—

=== By district ===
Results of the 2010 United States House of Representatives elections in South Carolina by district:

District	Republican		Democratic		Others		Total		Result
District	Votes	%	Votes	%	Votes	%	Votes	%	Result
District 1	152,755	65.37%	67,008	28.67%	13,932	5.96%	233,695	100.00%	Republican hold
District 2	138,861	53.47%	113,625	43.76%	7,186	2.77%	259,672	100.00%	Republican hold
District 3	126,235	62.46%	66,497	32.90%	9,376	4.64%	202,108	100.00%	Republican hold
District 4	137,586	63.45%	62,438	28.80%	16,814	7.75%	216,838	100.00%	Republican hold
District 5	125,834	55.12%	102,296	44.81%	156	0.07%	228,286	100.00%	Republican gain
District 6	72,661	36.40%	125,459	62.86%	1,470	0.74%	199,590	100.00%	Democratic hold
Total	753,932	56.26%	537,323	40.09%	48,934	3.65%	1,340,189	100.00%	.

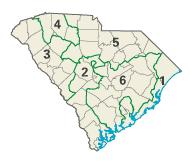
South Carolina's 6 congressional districts

== District 1 ==
2010 South Carolina's 1st congressional district election
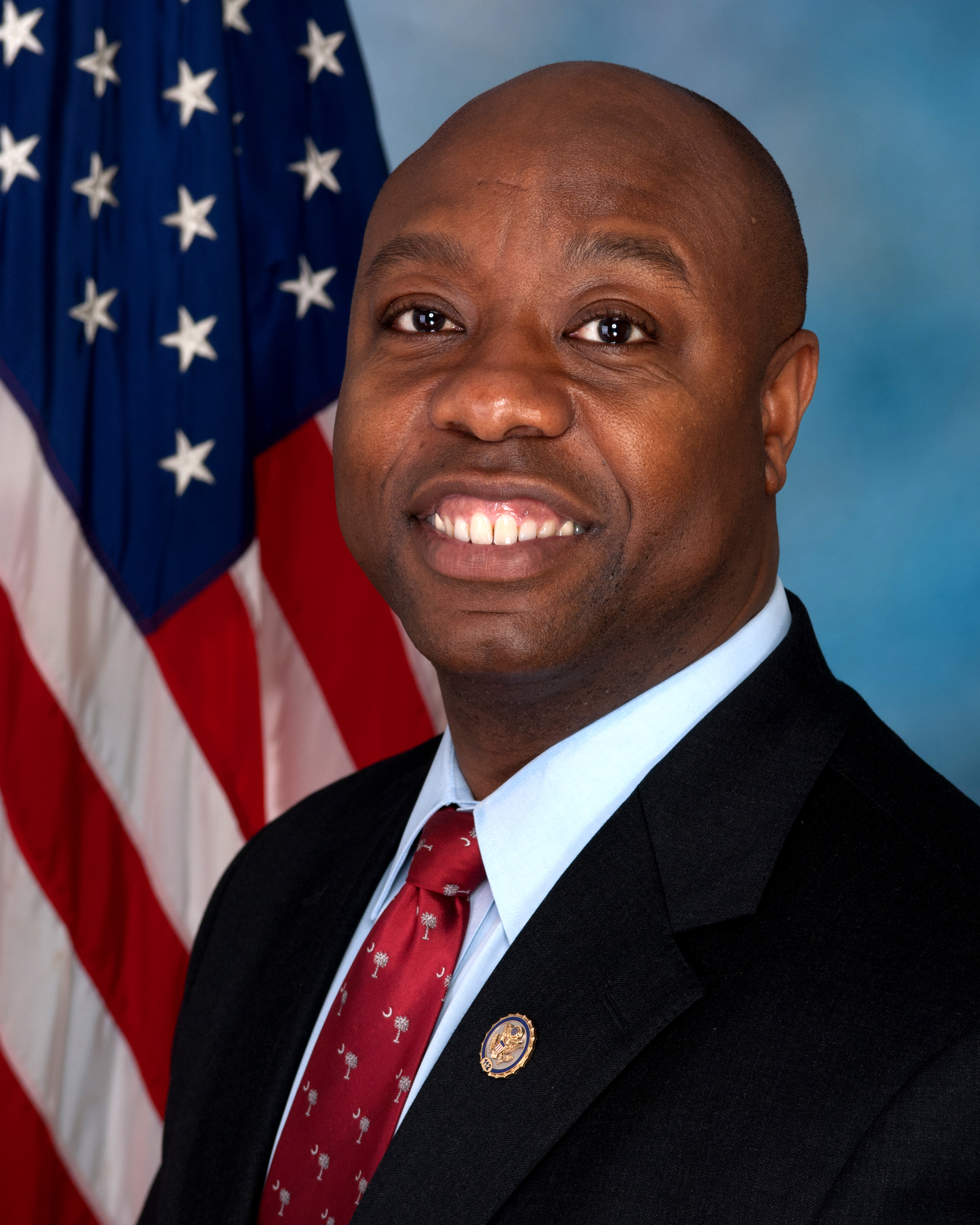

Nominee	Tim Scott	Ben Frasier
Party	Republican	Democratic
Popular vote	152,755	67,008
Percentage	65.4%	28.7%
- County results Scott: 60–70%
U.S. Representative before election
Henry E. Brown Jr.
Republican
Elected U.S. Representative
Tim Scott
Republican

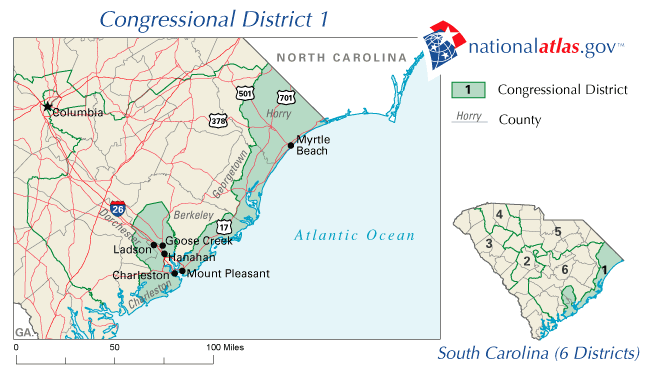

Incumbent Republican Congressman Henry E. Brown Jr. had been in office since 2001 and was retiring. The open seat was contested by Democrat Ben Frasier, Republican Tim Scott, Green Robert Dobbs, Libertarian Keith Blandford, Working Families Rob Groce, United Citizens Milton Elmer "Mac" McCullough Jr. and Independence Party Jimmy Wood. Scott defeated Paul Thurmond in the primary runoff election.

=== Predictions ===
Source	Ranking	As of
The Cook Political Report	Safe R	November 1, 2010
Rothenberg	Safe R	November 1, 2010
Sabato's Crystal Ball	Safe R	November 1, 2010
RCP	Safe R	November 1, 2010
CQ Politics	Safe R	October 28, 2010
New York Times	Safe R	November 1, 2010
FiveThirtyEight	Safe R	November 1, 2010

South Carolina's 1st congressional district election, 2010
Party	Candidate	Votes	%
Republican	Tim Scott	152,755	65.37
Democratic	Ben Frasier	67,008	28.67
Working Families	Rob Groce	4,148	1.77
Green	Robert Dobbs	3,369	1.44
Libertarian	Keith Blandford	2,750	1.18
Independence	Jimmy Wood	2,489	1.07
United Citizens	Milton Elmer "Mac" McCullough Jr.	1,013	0.43
Write-ins		163	0.07
Total votes		233,695	100.00
Republican hold			

- South Carolina District 1 race from OurCampaigns.com
- Campaign contributions from OpenSecrets
- 2010 South Carolina - 1st District from CQ Politics
- Race profile at The New York Times

== District 2 ==
2010 South Carolina's 2nd congressional district election
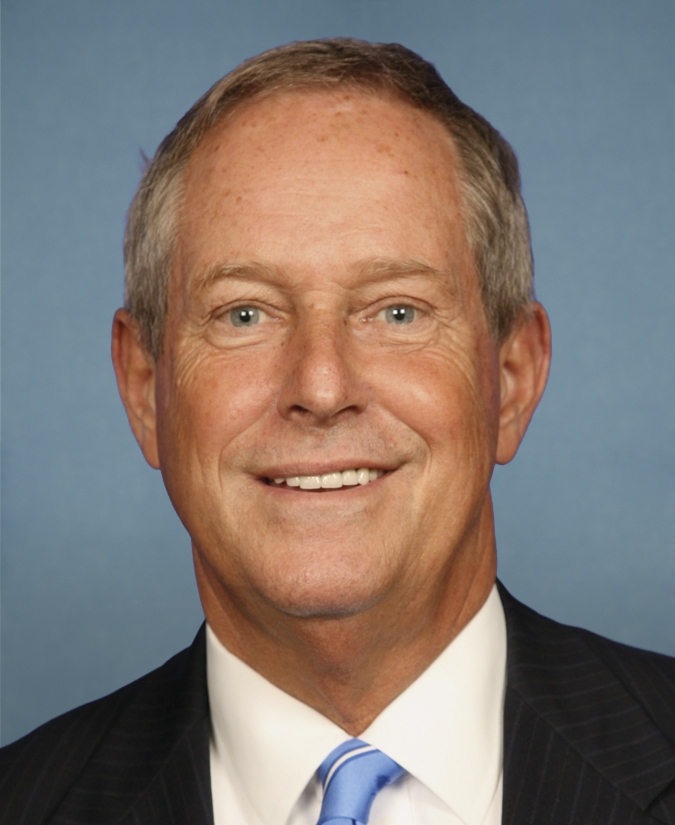

Nominee	Joe Wilson	Rob Miller
Party	Republican	Democratic
Popular vote	138,861	113,625
Percentage	53.5%	43.8%
- County results Miller: 50–60% 60–70% 70–80% Wilson: 50–60% 60–70%
U.S. Representative before election
Joe Wilson
Republican
Elected U.S. Representative
Joe Wilson
Republican

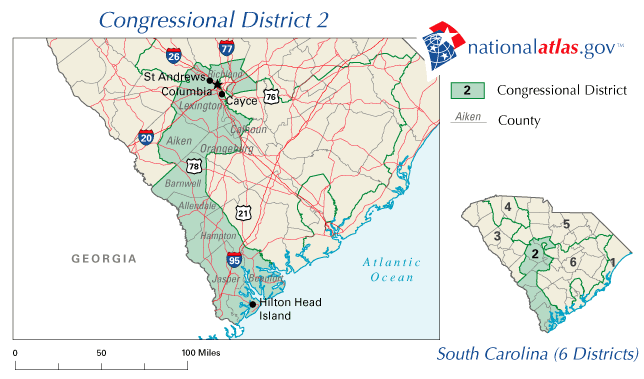

Incumbent Republican Congressman Joe Wilson had been in office since 2001. Wilson defeated Democratic nominee Iraq War Veteran Rob Miller, Libertarian Eddie McCain, and the Constitution Party's Marc Beaman.

=== Predictions ===
Source	Ranking	As of
The Cook Political Report	Safe R	November 1, 2010
Rothenberg	Safe R	November 1, 2010
Sabato's Crystal Ball	Safe R	November 1, 2010
RCP	Safe R	November 1, 2010
CQ Politics	Safe R	October 28, 2010
New York Times	Safe R	November 1, 2010
FiveThirtyEight	Safe R	November 1, 2010

South Carolina's 2nd congressional district election, 2010
Party	Candidate	Votes	%
Republican	Joe Wilson (incumbent)	138,861	53.48
Democratic	Rob Miller	113,625	43.76
Libertarian	Eddie McCain	4,228	1.63
Constitution	Marc Beaman	2,856	1.10
Write-ins		102	0.04
Total votes		259,672	100.00
Republican hold			

- South Carolina District 2 race from OurCampaigns.com
- Campaign contributions from OpenSecrets
- 2010 South Carolina - 2nd District from CQ Politics
- Race profile at The New York Times

== District 3 ==
2010 South Carolina's 3rd congressional district election
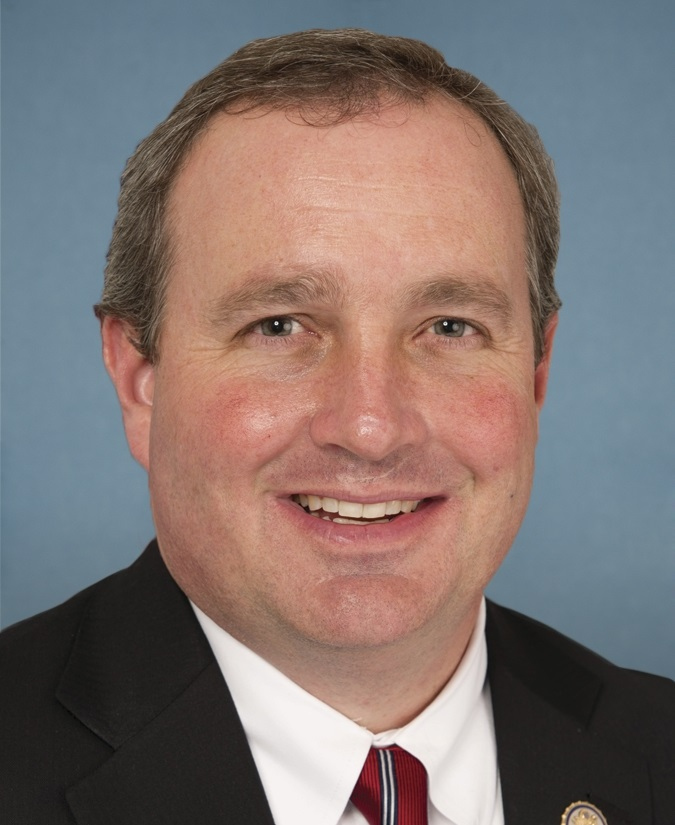
Nominee	Jeff Duncan	Jane Ballard Dyer
Party	Republican	Democratic
Popular vote	126,235	73,095
Percentage	62.5%	36.2%
- County results Duncan: 50–60% 60–70% Dyer: 50–60%
U.S. Representative before election
J. Gresham Barrett
Republican
Elected U.S. Representative
Jeff Duncan
Republican

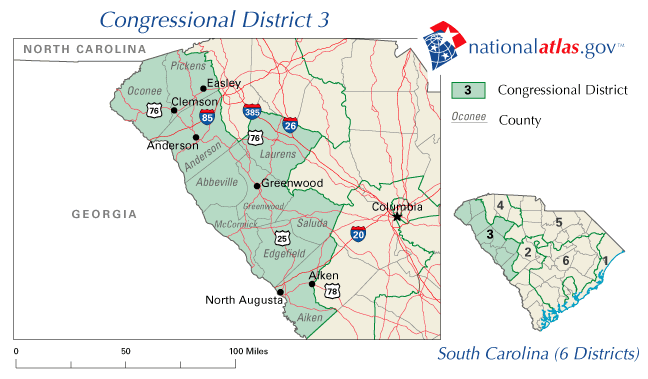

Incumbent Republican Congressman J. Gresham Barrett had been in office since 2003, but decided to retire to run for governor. The open seat was contested by Republican nominee Jeff Duncan, Democratic / Working Families nominee Jane Ballard Dyer, and Constitution Party nominee John Dalen. Duncan had come in second in the Republican Primary at 25%, but beat Richard Cash in the runoff 51% to 49%.

=== Predictions ===
Source	Ranking	As of
The Cook Political Report	Safe R	November 1, 2010
Rothenberg	Safe R	November 1, 2010
Sabato's Crystal Ball	Safe R	November 1, 2010
RCP	Safe R	November 1, 2010
CQ Politics	Safe R	October 28, 2010
New York Times	Safe R	November 1, 2010
FiveThirtyEight	Safe R	November 1, 2010

South Carolina's 3rd congressional district election, 2010
Party	Candidate	Votes	%
Republican	Jeff Duncan	126,235	62.46
Democratic	Jane Ballard Dyer	73,095	36.16
Constitution	John Dalen	2,682	1.33
Write-ins		96	0.05
Total votes		202,108	100.00
Republican hold			

- South Carolina District 3 race from OurCampaigns.com
- Campaign contributions from OpenSecrets
- 2010 South Carolina - 3rd District from CQ Politics
- Race profile at The New York Times

== District 4 ==
2010 South Carolina's 4th congressional district election
- November 2, 2010
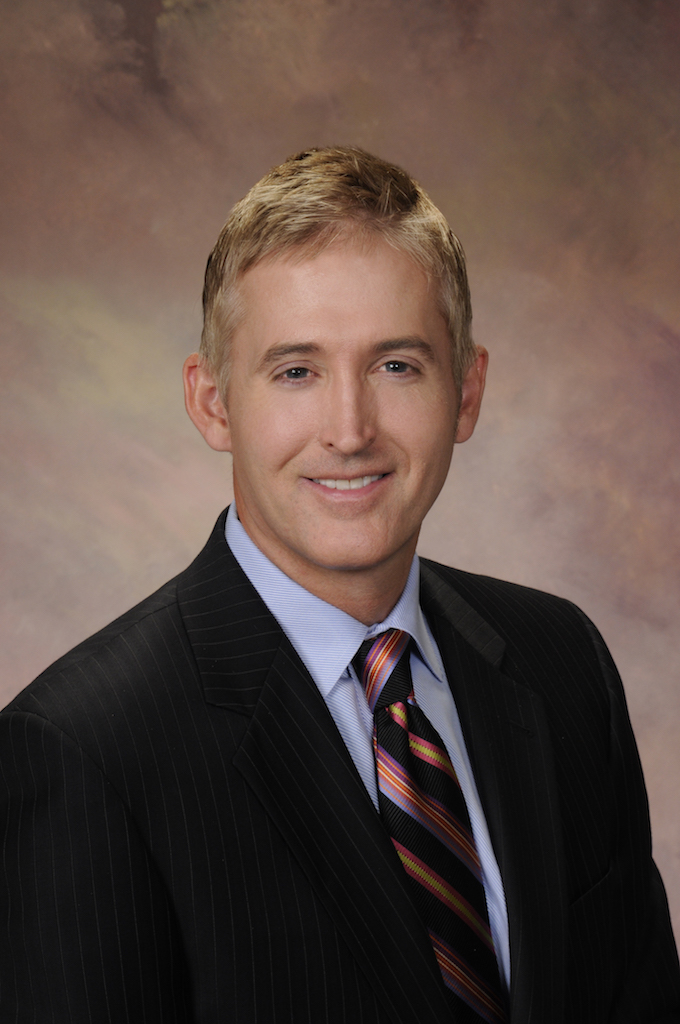

Nominee	Trey Gowdy	Paul Corden	Dave Edwards
Party	Republican	Democratic	Constitution
Popular vote	137,586	62,438	11,059
Percentage	63.45%	28.79%	5.10%
- County results Gowdy: 50–60% 60–70%
U.S. Representative before election
Bob Inglis
Republican
Elected U.S. Representative
Trey Gowdy
Republican

This was an open seat. Incumbent Republican Congressman Bob Inglis had been in office since 2005, but he lost to Trey Gowdy in the primary election. Trey Gowdy would go on to defeat the Democratic nominee Paul Corden, Green Party's Faye Walters, Libertarian Rick Mahler, and the Constitution Party's Dave Edwards.

=== Republican primary ===
==== Nominee ====
- Trey Gowdy, 7th Circuit Solicitor

==== Eliminated in primary ====
- Bob Inglis, incumbent U.S. representative
- Jim Lee, businessman
- David L. Thomas, state senator
- Christina Jeffrey, college professor and former Historian of the U.S. House

==== Results ====
2010 GOP primary results by precinct: Gowdy: 20–30%; 30–40%; 40–50%; 50–60%; 60–70%; 70–80%; 80–90%; Inglis: 20–30%; 30–40%; 40–50%; 50–60%; 70–80%; Thomas: 20–30%; 30–40%; 40–50%; 50–60%; Lee: 20–30%; 30–40%; Tie

Republican primary results
Party	Candidate	Votes	%
Republican	Trey Gowdy	34,103	39.2%
Republican	Bob Inglis (incumbent)	23,877	27.5%
Republican	Jim Lee	11,854	13.6%
Republican	David Lloyd Thomas	11,073	12.7%
Republican	Christina Jeffrey	6,041	7.0%
Total votes		86,948	100.0%

==== Primary runoff results ====
2010 GOP primary runoff results by precinct: Gowdy: 50–60%; 60–70%; 70–80%; 80–90%; 90–100%; Inglis: 50–60%; Tie

Republican primary runoff results
Party	Candidate	Votes	%
Republican	Trey Gowdy	54,412	70.7%
Republican	Bob Inglis (incumbent)	22,590	29.3%
Total votes		77,002	100.0%

=== Predictions ===
Source	Ranking	As of
The Cook Political Report	Safe R	November 1, 2010
Rothenberg	Safe R	November 1, 2010
Sabato's Crystal Ball	Safe R	November 1, 2010
RCP	Safe R	November 1, 2010
CQ Politics	Safe R	October 28, 2010
New York Times	Safe R	November 1, 2010
FiveThirtyEight	Safe R	November 1, 2010

South Carolina's 4th congressional district election, 2010
Party	Candidate	Votes	%
Republican	Trey Gowdy	137,586	63.45
Democratic	Paul Corden	62,438	28.79
Constitution	Dave Edwards	11,059	5.10
Libertarian	Rick Mahler	3,010	1.39
Green	Faye Walters	2,564	1.18
Write-ins		181	0.08
Total votes		216,838	100.00
Republican hold			

- South Carolina District 4 race from OurCampaigns.com
- Campaign contributions from OpenSecrets
- 2010 South Carolina - 4th District from CQ Politics
- Candidates For Congress Debate Live At WYFF4 at WYFF, October 12, 2010

== District 5 ==
2010 South Carolina's 5th congressional district election
- November 2, 2010
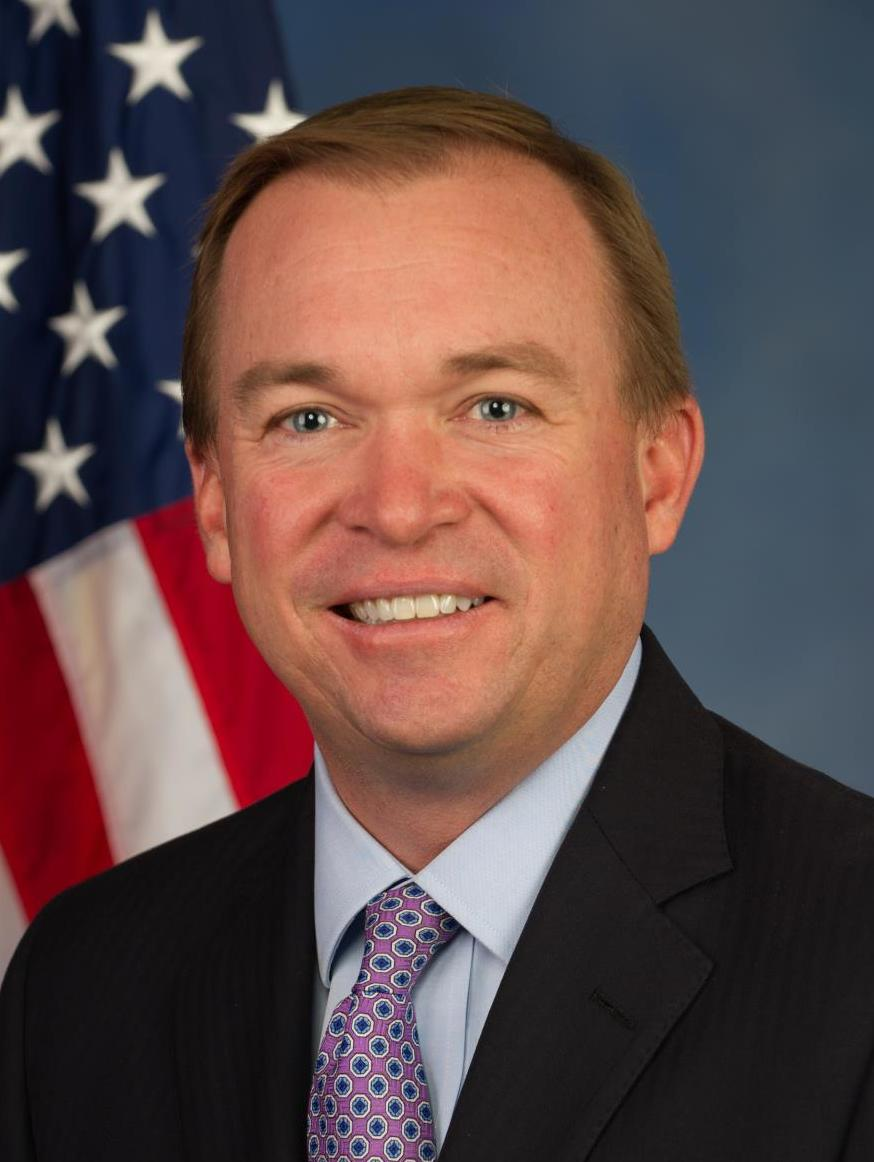

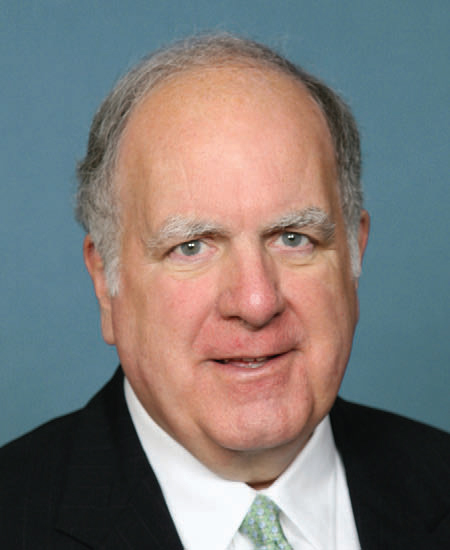
Nominee	Mick Mulvaney	John Spratt
Party	Republican	Democratic
Popular vote	125,834	102,296
Percentage	55.12%	44.81%
- County results Mulvaney: 50–60% 60–70% Spratt: 50–60% 60–70%
U.S. Representative before election
John Spratt
Democratic
Elected U.S. Representative
Mick Mulvaney
Republican

Democratic incumbent John Spratt was defeated by Republican Mick Mulvaney.

=== Predictions ===
Source	Ranking	As of
The Cook Political Report	Tossup	November 1, 2010
Rothenberg	Lean R (flip)	November 1, 2010
Sabato's Crystal Ball	Lean R (flip)	November 1, 2010
RCP	Lean R (flip)	November 1, 2010
CQ Politics	Tossup	October 28, 2010
New York Times	Tossup	November 1, 2010
FiveThirtyEight	Likely R (flip)	November 1, 2010

South Carolina's 5th congressional district election, 2010
Party	Candidate	Votes	%
Republican	Mick Mulvaney	125,834	55.12
Democratic	John Spratt (incumbent)	102,296	44.81
Write-ins		156	0.07
Total votes		228,286	100.00
Republican gain from Democratic			

- South Carolina District 5 race from OurCampaigns.com
- Campaign contributions from OpenSecrets
- 2010 South Carolina - 5th District from CQ Politics
- Race profile at The New York Times

== District 6 ==
2010 South Carolina's 6th congressional district election
- November 2, 2010
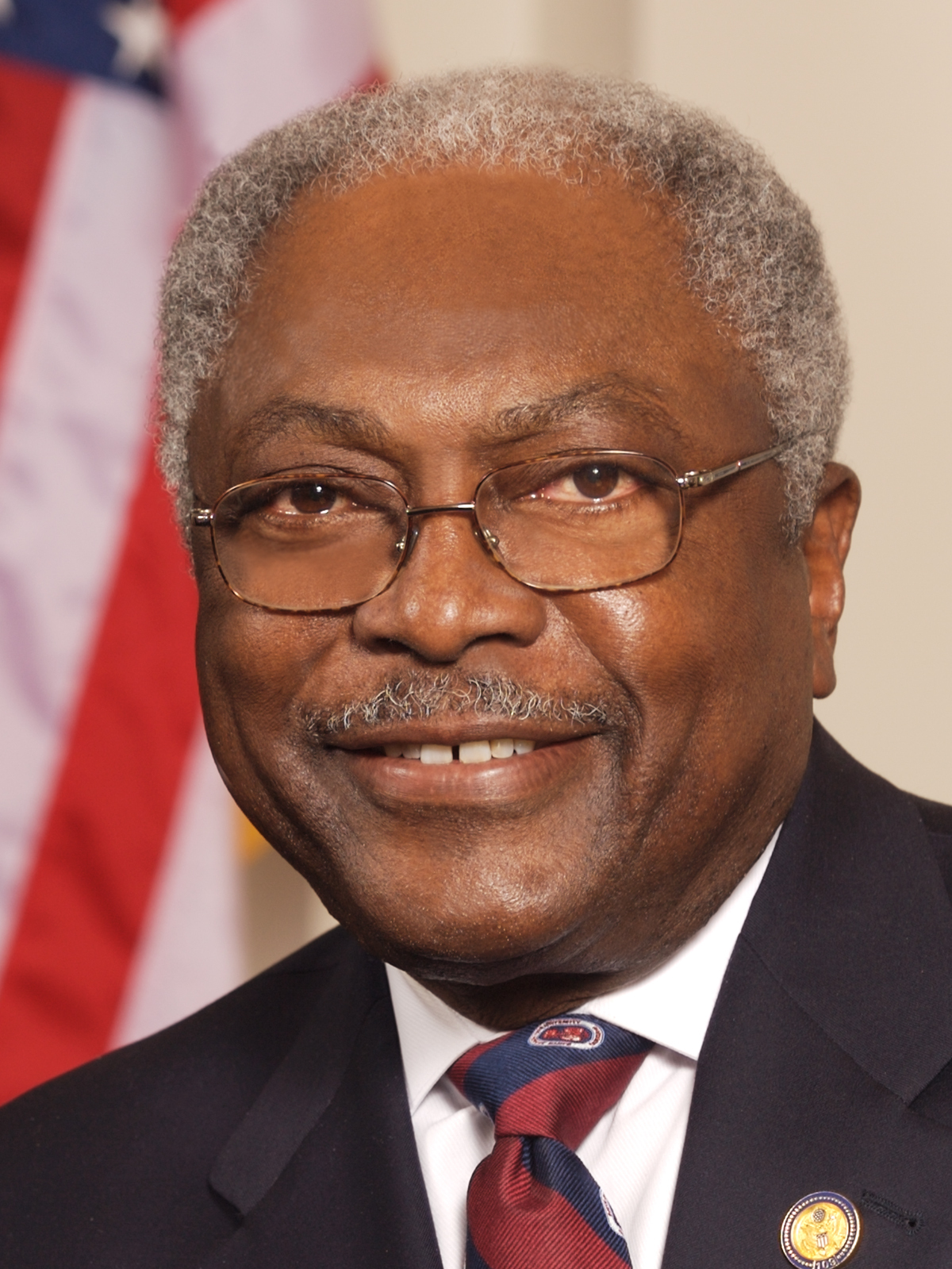

Nominee	Jim Clyburn	Jim Pratt
Party	Democratic	Republican
Popular vote	125,459	72,661
Percentage	62.86%	36.41%
- County results Clyburn: 50–60% 60–70% 70–80% 80–90% Pratt: 50–60%
U.S. Representative before election
Jim Clyburn
Democratic
Elected U.S. Representative
Jim Clyburn
Democratic

Incumbent Democratic Congressman Jim Clyburn had been in office since 1993. He won re-election against Republican Jim Pratt and Nammu Y. Muhammad of the Green Party.

=== Predictions ===
Source	Ranking	As of
The Cook Political Report	Safe D	November 1, 2010
Rothenberg	Safe D	November 1, 2010
Sabato's Crystal Ball	Safe D	November 1, 2010
RCP	Safe D	November 1, 2010
CQ Politics	Safe D	October 28, 2010
New York Times	Safe D	November 1, 2010
FiveThirtyEight	Safe D	November 1, 2010

South Carolina's 6th congressional district election, 2010
Party	Candidate	Votes	%
Democratic	Jim Clyburn (incumbent)	125,459	62.86
Republican	Jim Pratt	72,661	36.41
Green	Nammu Y. Muhammad	1,389	0.70
Write-ins		81	0.04
Total votes		199,590	100.00
Democratic hold			

- South Carolina District 6 race from OurCampaigns.com
- Campaign contributions from OpenSecrets
- 2010 South Carolina - 6th District from CQ Politics
- South Carolina 2010 Official Election Results from South Carolina State Election Commission
- Race profile at The New York Times

== See also ==
- Politics of South Carolina

Preceded by 2008 elections	United States House elections in South Carolina; 2010	Succeeded by 2012 elections
