= Ross Turner =

American politician from Greenville, South Carolina

Member of the South Carolina Senate from the 8th district
- Incumbent
- Assumed office 2012
- Preceded by: David L. Thomas

Personal details
- Born: May 15, 1964 (age 62) Greenville, South Carolina, United States
- Party: Republican
- Spouse: Julie Barker (m. 1990)
- Children: 3
- Education: Clemson University (B.S., 1996)
- Profession: Insurance agent

Clarence Ross Turner III (born May 15, 1964) is an American politician and insurance businessman. He is a member of the South Carolina Senate from the 8th District (Greenville), serving since 2012. Turner is a member of the Republican party.

== S.C. Senate ==
Turner was first elected to represent South Carolina's 8th Senate district in 2012, when he defeated David L. Thomas in the Republican primary.

Turner was a member of the following state senate committees in the 2021–2022 legislative session:

- Banking and Insurance
- Corrections and Penology
- Education
- Corrections and Penology
- Finance
- Fish, Game, and Forestry

As of May 2020, Turner was part of a new Reopen South Carolina select committee, which worked on policy for the post-COVID reopening of the state's economy.

== Endorsements ==
In June 2023, Turner endorsed Tim Scott in the 2024 United States presidential election.

== Personal life ==
Turner is the son of Clarence Ross Jr. (1931–2013) and Anne Summers Turner, and was born in Greenville, South Carolina. He is a Methodist. After earning a B.S. degree in Financial Management from Clemson University in 1986, he married wife Julie on January 20, 1990. They have three children. Turner became a Certified Insurance Counselor in 1994. He currently heads his family's insurance business, The Turner Agency, Inc.

== Electoral history ==
Year	Office	Type	Party	Main opponent	Party	Votes for Turner				Result	Swing	Ref.
Year	Office	Type	Party	Main opponent	Party	Total	%	P.	±%	Result	Swing	Ref.
2012	S.C. Senate	Rep. primary	Republican	David L. Thomas (Note: Incumbent seeking re-election.)	Republican	1,953	26.55%	2nd	N/A	Runoff	N/A	
2012	S.C. Senate	Rep. primary runoff	Republican	Joe Swann	Republican	2,784	50.32%	1st	N/A	Won	N/A	
2012	S.C. Senate	General	Republican	Write-in	N/A	37,847	98.34%	1st	N/A	Won	Hold	
2016	S.C. Senate	General	Republican	Write-in	N/A	42,425	98.59%	1st	+0.25%	Won	Hold	
2020	S.C. Senate	Rep. primary	Republican	Janice S. Curtis	Republican	9,438	68.20%	1st	+17.82%	Won	N/A	
2020	S.C. Senate	General	Republican	Write-in	N/A	49,180	96.36%	1st	-2.23%	Won	Hold	
2024	S.C. Senate	General	Republican	Taylor Culliver	Democratic							

== Notes ==
South Carolina Senate
Preceded by David L. Thomas	Member of the South Carolina Senate from the 8th district 2012–present	Incumbent
