= Richard Cash (politician) =

American politician for South Carolina

Member of the South Carolina Senate from the 3rd district
- Incumbent
- Assumed office 2017
- Preceded by: Kevin L. Bryant

Personal details
- Born: March 31, 1960 (age 66) Jacksonville, Florida, United States
- Party: Republican
- Spouse: Marcia Williams (m. 1985)
- Children: 8
- Education: Furman University (B.A., 1982); Gordon-Conwell Theological Seminary (MATS, 1990)
- Profession: Businessman

Richard J. Cash (born March 31, 1960) is an American businessman and politician. He is a member of the Republican Party has served as a member of the South Carolina Senate from the 3rd District since 2017.

== Early life and education ==
Cash was born on March 31, 1960 in Jacksonville, Florida to Thomas and Audrey Cash. He graduated magna cum laude from Furman University in 1982 with a BA in business management. While there, he was a member of Phi Beta Kappa. In 1990, he received a Master of Arts in Theological Studies (MATS) from Gordon-Conwell Theological Seminary.

== S.C. Senate ==
Cash has represented the 3rd District (northern Anderson County) since 2017. He was elected during a special election to fill the unexpired term of Kevin L. Bryant, who vacated the seat after accepting the position of Lt. Governor of South Carolina.

=== LGBT rights ===
Cash has an established history of anti-LGBT views. He has opposed hate crime bills because of the inclusion of gender and sexual identities. He has sponsored legislation to restrict the rights of transgender youth.

=== Reproductive rights ===
Cash is a staunch opponent of abortion. For example, when he opposed Lindsey Graham from the right in 2014, his ads touted numerous arrests for protesting abortion and criticized Graham for his positions on abortion.

In 2023, Cash was one of the main Senators to push for tighter abortion restrictions in the state, opposing the 'Sister Senators', the five women who worked together across party lines to resist the bill. The Senate passed a six-week abortion law that year, with certain exceptions for sexual assault, incest, fetal anomalies, and medical emergency.

In 2025, Cash authored Senate Bill 323, which sought to make abortion a felony offense punishable by up to 30 years in prison and remove the exceptions that South Carolina currently allows for sexual assault, incest, and fetal anomalies. It also sought to criminalize providing information on how to access abortion legally. The State Senate Medical Affairs subcommittee, chaired by Cash, declined to advance the bill after it failed in a 3-2 vote on November 18, 2025. Cash and Senator Tom Fernandez voted in favor of advancing the bill, while Senators Deon Tedder, Ronnie A. Sabb, and Brad Hutto voted against it. Four Republican senators abstained from voting.

== Endorsements ==
=== U.S. House of Representatives ===
- In 2024, Cash endorsed Stewart Jones of the House Freedom Caucus for South Carolina's 3rd congressional district after Congressman Jeff Duncan announced he would not run for re-election.

== Personal life ==
Cash is a Presbyterian, and a member of Christ Church, EPC in Anderson. He is an owner and manager of rental properties.

== Electoral history ==
Year	Office	Type	Party	Main opponent	Party	Votes for Cash				Result	Swing	Ref.
Year	Office	Type	Party	Main opponent	Party	Total	%	P.	±%	Result	Swing	Ref.
2010	U.S. Representative	Rep. primary	Republican	Jeff Duncan	Republican	20,923	25.35%	1st	N/A	Runoff	N/A	
2010	U.S. Representative	Rep. primary runoff	Republican	Jeff Duncan	Republican	35,129	48.50%	2nd	N/A	Lost	N/A	
2014	Senator	Rep. primary	Republican	Lindsey Graham (Note: Incumbent seeking re-election.)	Republican	26,325	8.30%	3rd	N/A	Lost	N/A	
2017	S.C. Senator	Rep. primary	Republican	Carol Burdette	Republican	2,032	25.82%	2nd	N/A	Runoff	N/A	
2017	S.C. Senator	Rep. primary runoff	Republican	Carol Burdette	Republican	4,869	54.40%	1st	N/A	Won	N/A	
2017	S.C. Senator	Special	Republican	Write-in	N/A	3,035	81.70%	1st	N/A	Won	Hold	
2020	S.C. Senator	Rep. primary	Republican	Craig Wooten	Republican	9,411	56.76%	1st	N/A	Now	N/A	
2020	S.C. Senator	General	Republican	Judith Polson	Democratic	44,446	74.03%	1st	N/A	Now	Hold	

- In 2017, Cash received several endorsements, including from Lt. Governor Bryant, Representative Jonathan D. Hill, and the Club for Growth.
- In 2020, Cash was endorsed by the NRA Political Victory Fund, Republican Liberty Caucus, and South Carolina Citizens for Life.

== Notes ==
South Carolina Senate
Preceded by Kevin L. Bryant	Member of the South Carolina Senate from the 3rd district 2017–present	Incumbent
