= David L. Thomas =

American politician

David Lloyd Thomas

Member of the South Carolina Senate from the 8th district
- In office 1984–2012
- Preceded by: Norma C. Russell
- Succeeded by: Ross Turner

At-large member of the Greenville City Council
- In office 1979 – November 19, 1984
- Succeeded by: Eleanor Welling

Personal details
- Born: September 10, 1949 (age 76) Seneca, South Carolina, U.S.
- Party: Republican
- Spouses: Fran Thomas (died 2014) Kim Craig (m. 2016)
- Profession: Attorney

David Lloyd Thomas (born September 10, 1949) is a Republican former member of the South Carolina Senate. He represented District 8 from 1984 to 2012, which included part of Greenville.

He was a partner at the firm Moore, Taylor & Thomas, P.A. (formerly Wilson, Moore, Taylor & Thomas, P.A.). Current U.S. Representative Joe Wilson of South Carolina's 2nd congressional district was a partner with this firm prior to his election to Congress to succeed Floyd Spence.

== Early life, education, and early political career ==
He has degrees from UNC-Charlotte (Bachelor's degree), TCU, Southwestern Theological Seminary (Master of Divinity), and the University of South Carolina (Juris Doctor).

He served as an at-large member of the Greenville City Council from 1979 to 1984 and in his last year on the council was Mayor Pro-Tempore under Mayor Bill Workman.

== South Carolina Senate ==
=== Elections ===
Thomas first won election to the state senate in 1984. He was reelected six times, never facing a Democratic challenger—in 1988 (99%), 1992 (98%), 1996 (100%), 2000 (89%), 2004 (99%), and 2008 (99%). He lost the 2012 Republican primary in a five-way race, finishing in third place after receiving only 20.5% of the vote—well short of qualifying for the runoff.

=== Tenure ===
On May 20, 2009, Thomas voted to force Governor Mark Sanford to take the ARRA funds, or the federal stimulus, and use the one time money for reoccurring needs.

Thomas was one of the first conservative Republican state senators to call for the resignation or impeachment of Governor Mark Sanford. In August 2009, he wrote a letter to state legislative leaders saying that in his view, Sanford's use of expensive plane tickets on state business were an impeachable offense.

In September 2011 USA Today ran a story on legislative pensions and how legislators abused their power to "pump up their pensions." Thomas was the poster child for this article. USA Today found that he had taken home over $148,000 more than other South Carolina legislators.

At the time of the USA Today article, Thomas had paid for thirty years of service necessary to draw legislative retirement pay instead of legislative salary which comes from the General Fund of South Carolina's State Budget. Nineteen other South Carolina senators have chosen to take the $32,390 retirement pay from the General Assembly Retirement System, which also comes from the General Fund of South Carolina's State Budget, rather than the $10,400 salary. South Carolina has one of the lowest pay scales for legislators among the fifty states.

=== Committee assignments ===
Thomas was Chairman of the Banking and Insurance Committee and Chairman of the Senate Finance Committee Sub-committee on Constitutional/Administrative Officers.

== Other political activities ==
He is also the founder of Palmetto Pride (Litter Task Force) which is an organization aimed at litter cleanup.

=== Presidential politics ===
Thomas was the Greenville chairman of the 1980 Ronald W. Reagan for president campaign, while Greenville Mayor Jesse L. Helms was supporting former Governor John B. Connally Jr., of Texas. Thomas was the state co-chair, along with State Representative Terry Haskins of the 1988 Jack Kemp for president campaign. In 2008, he served as State Legislative Co-chair of the Mike Huckabee for president.

=== 2002 run for lieutenant governor ===
He ran for Lieutenant Governor of South Carolina in 2002. He finished first in the Republican primary but failed to reach the 50% threshold needed to avoid a run-off election, getting 37% of the vote. He lost the run-off election to fellow State Senator Andre Bauer 51%-49%, a difference of 4,491 votes.

=== 2010 congressional election ===
On June 6, 2009, Thomas announced his candidacy for the U.S. House of Representatives, challenging incumbent Bob Inglis in the Republican primary for the 4th District. Thomas ran well to Inglis' right, and has criticized many of Inglis' recent votes. Inglis had been one of the most conservative members of the House when he represented the district from 1993 to 1999, but his voting record since his return to Congress in 2005 has been considerably more moderate. Thomas finished fourth in the primary, getting only 12 percent of the vote and losing his own state senate district.

Thomas did not have to give up his seat to run for Congress. South Carolina state senators serve four-year terms coinciding with presidential elections, and Thomas was not up for re-election until 2012.

=== Legislative Pension ===
Thomas elected to take a yearly lifelong payout of $32,390 in deferred pay from the General Assembly Retirement System rather than his $10,400 salary. He became eligible for the payout at age 55.

== Personal life ==
Thomas has been married to his wife Fran since 1984, and they live in Fountain Inn in Greenville County. His family is originally from Spartanburg’s Glendale community. He attends Calvary Baptist Church in Simpsonville.
