= Tom Young Jr. =

American politician

Member of the South Carolina Senate from the 24th district
- Incumbent
- Assumed office 2013
- Preceded by: Greg Ryberg

Member of the South Carolina House of Representatives from the 81st district
- In office 2008–2012
- Preceded by: Robert S. Perry Jr.
- Succeeded by: Don L. Wells

Personal details
- Born: October 8, 1971 (age 54) Aiken, South Carolina, U.S.
- Party: Republican
- Spouse: Heather Winkles (m. 2001)
- Education: University of South Carolina (BA, JD)
- Profession: Attorney, business owner

Tom Young Jr. (born October 8, 1971) is an American politician. He is a member of the South Carolina Senate from the 24th District (Aiken County), serving since 2012. He is a member of the Republican party.

== Early life and education ==
Young was born on October 8, 1971 in Aiken, South Carolina, to Delly and Tom Sr. Young. He attended the University of South Carolina, receiving a B.A. in 1993 and a JD from their law school in 1996. During his undergraduate degree, he was Student Body President (1992–93) and a member of Phi Beta Kappa.

== Political career ==
=== S.C. House of Representatives ===
==== Tenure ====
Young represented the 81s district in the House of Representatives from 2009 to 2012.

=== S.C. Senate ===
==== Elections ====
===== 2012 election =====
In 2012, Young ran for the seat vacated by Republican incumbent W. Greg Ryberg.

===== 2016 election =====
In 2016, Young ran unopposed.

===== 2020 election =====
In 2020, Young ran in an uncontested race.

===== 2024 election =====
In 2024, Young will face Democratic challenger, Dee Elder, in the general election in November.

== Personal life ==
Yong lives in Aiken, South Carolina with his wife, Heather, and 2 children. He is a member of St. John's United Methodist Church.

South Carolina Senate
Preceded by W. Greg Ryberg	Member of the South Carolina Senate from the 24th district 2013–present	Incumbent
