= Greg Hembree =

American politician

Member of the South Carolina Senate from the 28th district
- Incumbent
- Assumed office 2013
- Preceded by: Dick Elliott

Personal details
- Born: August 21, 1960 (age 66) Fort Leonard Wood, Missouri, United States
- Party: Republican
- Spouse: Renee Robertson (m. 1985)
- Children: 3
- Education: University of Memphis (B.B.A.); University of South Carolina (J.D.)
- Profession: Attorney, politician

Greg Hembree (born August 21, 1960) is an American lawyer and politician. Since 2013, he has represented the 28th district (Dillon and Horry Counties) in the South Carolina Senate. He is a member of the Republican Party.

He graduated from the University of Memphis and University of South Carolina School of Law.

== Political career ==
=== S.C. Senate ===
==== 2012 elections ====
===== 2016 elections =====
In 2016, Hembree was reelected in an unchallenged race.

===== 2020 elections =====
Hembree was uncontested in 2020.

===== 2024 elections =====
In 2024, Hembree will face Democratic opposition Michael McCaffrey.

==== Tenure ====
Hembree is a member of the South Carolina Senate from the 28th District, serving since 2013. He serves as Chair of the Senate Education Committee, and also serves on the Senate Corrections and Penology, Finance, Rules and Transportation Committees.

South Carolina Senate
| Preceded by Dick Elliott | Member of the South Carolina Senate from the 28th district 2013–present | Incumbent |
