= John McCravy =

John McCravy may refer to:

- John R. McCravy (1907–1991), member of the South Carolina House of Representatives
- John R. McCravy III (born 1958), his grandson, member of the South Carolina House of Representatives
