= Billy Garrett (politician) =

American politician

Member of the South Carolina Senate from the 10th district
- Incumbent
- Assumed office November 9, 2020
- Preceded by: Floyd Nicholson

Personal details
- Born: October 5, 1956 (age 70) Williamston, South Carolina, U.S.
- Party: Republican
- Spouse: Denise W. (m. 1976)
- Children: 2
- Education: Lander University (B.A., 1978); University of South Carolina School of Law (J.D., 1983)
- Profession: Attorney, politician

Billy J. Garrett, Jr. (born October 5, 1956) is an American politician and lawyer. He is a member of the South Carolina Senate from the 10th District (McCormick), serving since 2020. He is a member of the Republican party.

== S.C. Senate ==
As of April 2024, Garrett serves on the Agriculture and Natural Resources Committee, the Banking and Insurance Committee, the Corrections and Penology Committee, the Judiciary Committee, and the Medical Affairs Committee.

Following redistricting after the 2020 US Census, S.C. Senate District 10 covers parts of Abbeville, Greenwood, McCormick and Saluda Counties.

On November 20, 2026, Garrett announced his resignation from the South Carolina Senate, citing unspecified health reasons.

== Political views ==
Garrett is self-described as pro-God, pro-gun, and pro-life. He is personal friends with John McCravy, primary sponsor of South Carolina's fetal heartbeat bills, and Garret himself is a staunch supporter of the legislation.

== Endorsements ==
In June 2023, Garrett endorsed Tim Scott in the 2024 United States presidential election.

== Personal life ==
Billy Garrett is an attorney at the Garrett Law Firm and resides in McCormick, South Carolina. He was born on October 5, 1956, in Williamston, South Carolina. He is the son of Sigrid S. and Billy J. Garrett, Sr. He and his wife Denise have two children, Tara G. Mitchell and Billy J., III, and two grandchildren.

In 1978, Garrett graduated from Lander University. He would go onto to the University of South Carolina Law School, where he would obtain his J.D. in 1983. He is a founding member of the South Carolina Criminal Defense Attorneys group.

== Electoral history ==
Year	Office	Type	Party	Main opponent	Party	Votes for Garrett				Result	Swing	Ref.
Year	Office	Type	Party	Main opponent	Party	Total	%	P.	±%	Result	Swing	Ref.
2020	S.C. Senate	Rep. primary	Republican	Bryan Hope	Republican	5,410	53.52%	1st	N/A	Won	N/A	
2020	S.C. Senate	General	Republican	Floyd Nicholson (Note: Incumbent seeking re-election.)	Democratic	23,989	55.96%	1st	N/A	Won	Gain	
2024	S.C. Senate	Rep. primary	Republican	Charles Bumgardner	Republican	5,292	41.06%	1st	N/A	Runoff	N/A	
2024	S.C. Senate	Rep. primary runoff	Republican	Charles Bumgardner	Republican	4,933	56.17%	1st	N/A	Won	N/A	

== Notes ==
South Carolina Senate
Preceded by Floyd Nicholson	Member of the South Carolina Senate from the 10th district 2020–present	Incumbent
