= Senator Nicholson =

Senator Nicholson may refer to:

- Alfred O. P. Nicholson (1808–1876), U.S. Senator from Tennessee from 1840 to 1842; also served in the Tennessee State Senate
- Donald W. Nicholson (1888–1968), Massachusetts State Senate
- Elwyn Nicholson (1923–2014), Louisiana State Senate
- Floyd Nicholson (born 1949), South Carolina Senate
- Isaac R. Nicholson (1789/90–1844), Mississippi State Senate
- Jeanne Nicholson (born 1952), Colorado State Senate
- Samuel D. Nicholson (1859–1921), U.S. Senator from Colorado from 1921 to 1923
