= Brad Hutto =

American politician (born 1957)

Minority Leader of the South Carolina Senate
- Incumbent
- Assumed office November 17, 2020
- Preceded by: Nikki G. Setzler

Member of the South Carolina Senate from the 40th district
- Incumbent
- Assumed office April 30, 1996
- Preceded by: Marshall Burns Williams

Personal details
- Born: August 6, 1957 (age 69) Orangeburg, South Carolina, U.S.
- Party: Democratic
- Spouse: Tracy Macpherson (m. 1985)
- Children: 1
- Education: University of South Carolina (BA); Georgetown University (JD)
- Profession: Trial lawyer, politician

C. Bradley Hutto (born August 6, 1957) is an American politician currently serving as a Democratic member of the South Carolina Senate, representing Senate District 40 since 1996. He is the Democratic Minority Leader in the Senate, succeeding Nikki Setzler on November 17, 2020.

== Early life and career ==
Brad Hutto was born on August 6, 1957 in Orangeburg, South Carolina. He grew up on a dairy farm in Orangeburg County, and, as a child, he participated in farm work like bailing hay, driving a tractor, and milking cows.

Hutto is an Eagle Scout and well known for contributions to the Boy Scouts of America (BSA) having served at the unit level as a Cubmaster of Pack 90. He serves on the Executive Board of the Indian Waters Council, BSA and served as Council President from 2009 to 2011. He is a vigil honor member in Muscogee Lodge, Order of the Arrow where he served as Lodge Chief in 1975. His Scouting recognitions include: Distinguished Eagle Scout, Silver Beaver, Order of the Arrow Founder's Award, and Centurion Award.

He is a 1978 graduate of the Honors College of the University of South Carolina and a 1981 graduate of the Georgetown University Law Center. Since 1982, he has practiced law with the firm of Williams & Williams in Orangeburg, S.C. Early in his career, Hutto defended Democrats caught in the FBI sting operation, Operation Lost Trust, leading the defense team for House Rep. Kenneth E. Bailey Sr.

=== Political work ===
Hutto has been an active member of the Democratic party since the early 1980s. In 1982, he worked for John Winburn's campaign to become House Representative for South Carolina's 5th Congressional District. While Winburn would ultimately lose the primary, the race would be close, leading to a runoff between Winburn and John Spratt where Winburn received about 45% of the vote. Spratt would hold the seat for almost 30 years, and Winburn would go on to become a lobbyist.

Prior to beginning his tenure in the South Carolina Senate, Hutto served as the Chairman of the Orangeburg County Democratic Party from 1988 to 1994. Jaime Harrison, then a high school student in Orangeburg, credits working with Hutto at this time as part of the reason he got so involved in politics.

== U.S. Senate ==
Prior to challenging Senator Lindsey Graham for his Senate seat in 2014, Hutto was on a short-list of possible Democrats entertaining the idea of running for Strom Thurmond's senate seat in 2001. Hutto ultimately declined to focus on establishing himself as a state senator and entertaining a state-wide race down the line.

=== 2014 election ===
Hutto filed to run for Senator Lindsey Graham's seat in the United States Senate in 2014. He announced his candidacy on March 28, 2014, saying that a "bruising primary" shaping up between Graham and Republican challengers "would give me an opening" in the race despite South Carolina's strong conservative lean. Hutto also criticized Graham for his frequent television appearances and said he would campaign to represent South Carolina's rural interests and communities. His pitch revolved around him being a pragmatic, middle-of-the-road guy who is not afraid to work with Republicans, while being more focus on the needs of South Carolina.

On May 14, 2014, the state chapter of the AFL-CIO endorsed Hutto, citing him as someone who has always stood up for working families in the State House. On May 28, 2014, the South Carolina Democratic Party's executive committee voted unanimously to endorse Hutto in the primary election over candidate Jay Stamper.

== State senate ==
=== Elections ===
Hutto was first elected to his seat in 1996 in a special election to fill the vacancy left when Marshall Burns Williams died in office. The special election was held on April 30, 1996, and Hutto faced Republican Bill Cox Jr.

Hutto ran unopposed in the 2012 and 2016 South Carolina Senate election.

==== 1996 election ====
After winning his seat in a special election in 1996, Hutto would face a Democratic primary during the official election cycle. He defeated Democratic challengers Jon Hare and Joe Wilder when he received 65% of the vote. In the general election, he defeated Republican Bill Cox Jr. by receiving 60% of the vote.

==== 2000 election ====
In 2000, Hutto defeated a third-party challenger, Libertarian Jonathan M. Hare, when he received 91% of the vote.

==== 2004 election ====
In 2004, Republican A. Clay Morris, registered nurse and motorcyclists' rights activist, attempted and failed to unseat Hutto. Hutto received 71% of the vote.

==== 2008 election ====
In 2008, Hutto faced Republican opposition in John Strickland. He defeated Strickland in the general election, receiving 72.5% of the votes in district 40.

==== 2020 election ====
In 2020, Hutto faced a Democratic primary challenger. Dr. Michael Addison campaigned around gun control and the idea that more could be done to boost premium agribusiness in the represented agricultural counties. Ultimately, Hutto defeated this challenge, receiving 71% of the vote. As he was unchallenged in the general election, he went on to win another term.

==== 2024 election ====
In 2024, Hutto faced Bamberg Democrat Kendrick Brown in the Democratic primary. Hutto won the Democratic primary, then he ran against Bamberg Republican Sharon Carter in the general election in November. Hutto went on to win that general election.

=== Tenure ===
Hutto has represented the 40th Senate District since 1996, covering all or portions of the counties of Allendale, Bamberg, Barnwell, Colleton, Hampton, and Orangeburg. His is the only Senate District that includes six county seats. Hutto serves on the following Senate Committees: Judiciary; Medical Affairs; Legislative Oversight; Banking and Insurance; Interstate Cooperation; Fish, Game and Forestry; Education; and Ethics. He is also a member of the Joint Citizens and Legislative Committee on Children and the Public Utilities Review Committee.

On May 11, 2017, Brad Hutto was the sole state Senator preventing the passage of a bill H3643 that would require universities funded by the state government to adopt the US State Department's definition of antisemitism. In November 2020, Hutto was selected as the Minority Leader of the South Carolina Senate succeeding Nikki G. Setzler.

==== Criminal justice and law enforcement ====
In 2002, Hutto was responsible for brokering a compromise in the Senate that lead to the reclassification of crack cocaine possession charges to equal that of cocaine charges. This not only saved the state money, but also returned voting rights to thousands of black individuals. In 2015, Hutto was a supporter of police body camera legislation.

Hutto is opposed to the death penalty. He opposed efforts by Republicans to pass legislation that would put twice-convicted child molesters to death. Nevertheless, in a pragmatic twist, Hutto was a supporter of bringing back the electric chair to make the job of correction officers "more efficient." Alongside Heather Bauer in the state House of Representatives, in 2023, Hutto introduced legislation to outlaw the death penalty for abortion.

Hutto also opposes mandatory minimums in sentencing. In 2005, he opposed 30-days in jail for second-time domestic violence convictions, and in 2009, he opposed mandatory jail time for child abuse.

In general, Hutto's philosophy about justice revolve around procedural justice and rehabilitative justice. He has often opposed laws that appeared simply to punish and fine, without any regards to educating or rehabilitating. For example, in 2005, he opposed Mark Sanford's efforts to toughen seat belts as he saw it as a surface-level revision, designed simply to punish and fine. In terms of procedural justice, Hutto has often raised issue with laws that might strip fundamental rights from those charged or convicted of a crime, advocating for the right to trial and the right to proper defense. Hutto has frequently argued for the punishment of a crime when one has occurred, but airing on the side of caution when accident might cause injury.

===== Marijuana =====
Hutto supports the legalization of medical applications of cannabis in South Carolina. From early efforts in 2014 that allowed cannabis oil for treatment in epilepsy cases to efforts to make medical cannabis more broadly available for pain management and opioid abuse treatment, Hutto has always been an advocate for medical marijuana legalization from the dual perspectives of healthcare reform and tax revenue.

===== DUIs =====
Throughout his tenure in the Senate, Brad Hutto has been heavily involved in legislation around DUIs and was once named a legislative champing by Mothers Against Drunk Driving (MADD) in 2013. They chose Hutto, in part, for his support of Emma's Law, a piece of legislation that would require drivers that get a DUI to have a breathalyzer ignition interlock device installed in their car. In 2023, he sponsored legislation that expanded the scope of DUIs that qualify for an ignition interlock device: Instead of just repeat offenders and DUIs that register over 0.15 BAC, the bill expanded to all individuals with a DUI conviction.

In 1999, Hutto supported a MADD-sponsored amendment to lower BAC threshold at which a jury may infer a driver is intoxicated down from 0.10 to 0.08, in-line with federal legislation proposed at the time. However, in 2000, he initially opposed efforts to adjust the law to automatically convict someone who measures 0.10 BAC as DUI without a right to a jury trial. He later would support the legislation, after getting the Senate to agree to his amendment that would guarantee the right to a trial by jury and the ability to question the breathalyzers results in court regardless of the BAC measured. By 2008, he was against further modifications to make DUI legislation even stricter.

Tangentially, Hutto has also worked to pass stronger boating under the influence laws.

==== Environment and wildlife ====
Hutto has a personal love for South Carolina's natural beauty. He has supported legislation around land conservation and preservation. In 2000, Hutto and his son Skyler lobbied the statehouse to consider the Carolina wolf spider as the state's official critter. In 2012, he was against dredging the Savannah River to deepen the port of Savannah, wanting to leave the natural geography untouched.

Hutto, representing majority rural counties, has also been a supporter of hunting in South Carolina. In 2011, a law was passed to legalize bear hunting around Myrtle Beach as the black bear population began to experience accelerated growth. According to the state Department of Natural Resources (DNR), hunters would need to kill 30 bears a year to keep the population in check, however, in 2017, only 13 bears had been killed over six years. Hutto encouraged expanding bear hunting to help manage bears in the tourist-heavy area. In 2024, Hutto proposed having a state run bounty to encourage the mass hunting of feral hogs within the state.

When alligator farming came to South Carolina in 2014, Hutto sponsored amendments that improved environmental regulations and inspections around the practice.

==== Flags ====
===== Confederate =====
From the early days of his time in Senate, Hutto was in support of efforts to remove the Confederate Flag from the South Carolina Statehouse grounds. In one of his first terms in 1999, he was a supporter of discussion and compromise on the removal. When the issue came back into the foray in 2015, he was a strong supporter of the flags removal.

===== State =====
Hutto opposes efforts to standardize the South Carolina State Flag. His personal view is that a blue flag with a white palmetto and crescent is iconic and recognizable, regardless of how their details look. He thinks that attempts to standardize the flag are merely an attempt by commercial entities to capitalize on a bureaucratic process.

==== LGBT+ rights ====
Since 2014, Hutto has been an outspoken advocate for LGBT rights, beginning with vocal support for the legalization of same-sex marriage in South Carolina and the United States more broadly. In 2015, when there were efforts in the South Carolina Senate to call for a constitutional convention to pass amendments to the US Constitution, Hutto put in place procedural blockers to derail the efforts, helping to prevent the call for an amendment banning same-sex marriage.

In efforts to pass a hate crime bill within South Carolina in the wake of the Charleston church shooting, Hutto pressed the Senate to include sexual orientation and gender identity in the state's legislative definition of protected characteristics. Though the initial legislation failed, the bill has been revisited from time to time, with Hutto refusing to let go of their inclusion in the bill.

Hutto has also opposed efforts to criminalize and ostracize transgender children within the state. He opposed efforts to ban transgender children from sports, preferring to not single out the half dozen of children it applied to and wanting to handle situations on a case-by-case basis. He fought against legislation passed to prevent children from receiving gender transition care, calling out the legislation for being punitive, stepping between the child-parent relationship, and forcing teachers to act as cops who necessarily report their students for any gender-related behaviors.

==== Public education ====
Hutto is a proponent of making the South Carolina public education system more equitable in line with the state constitution, and he fundamentally rejects attempts at privatizing the education system within South Carolina. Education has been a core focus of his tenure in the Senate.

In 2000, Hutto sought to reform truancy laws that would require a student be sent to jail if they missed more than 10 days of school. In 2002, he supported efforts to push for a constitutional amendment ballot measure to ban school vouchers for private school. In 2003, he introduced a mandatory PE and health bill with Linda Short. In 2015, he supported bipartisan efforts to pass Civics Education legislation. In 2024, Hutto referred to the expansion of private school vouchers as an attempt to re-segregate the school system while starving an already suffering public school system of much needed funds.

Hutto has opposed Republican attempts to allow for religion and religious doctrine to be enshrined in public schools. Often arguing from the perspective of pragmatism and preventing obvious federal lawsuits, he opposed allowing teachers and school boards placing the Ten Commandments in classrooms in 2002.

In 2017, Hutto was one of several Democratic Senators seeking to make technical colleges free for South Carolina residents.

==== Reproductive Rights ====
Hutto has been a consistent opponent of abortion restrictions in South Carolina. In 2014, he placed a procedural hold on legislation that would ban abortion, effectively preventing it from reaching a floor vote. When an identical bill appeared the following year, he met the legislation with another hold. On May 4, 2018, Hutto effectively killed legislation in the Senate which would have banned 97% of abortions in the state of South Carolina by forcing Republicans' into a much stricter bill. However, by 2021, Democrats lacked the numbers in the Senate to similarly block anti-abortion legislation. Because of this, Hutto found allies in the bipartisan collection of five women senators, such as Sandy Senn, who joined Hutto in a walk out to delay an abortion ban on March 4, 2022.

Hutto has pushed to raise the age of marriage to 18. On November 10, 2019, Hutto was one of several senators sponsoring legislation to that effect. He re-introduced similar legislation in 2021.

==== Video poker ====
Since 1999, Brad Hutto has been a vocal supporter of legislation that legalizes and regulates gambling industries. Despite this, video poker would be banned in the state in 2000. He was a member of the sub-committee that brought forth legislation leading to the South Carolina Education Lottery's creation in 2002.

In 2012, when new video "sweepstakes" machines appeared to circumvent existing state law, Hutto argued in favor of embracing these machines and seeking tax revenue through regulating them. Senators were not sympathetic to his view, with only one other Senator dissenting with Hutto when the Senate voted to ban the new type of gambling machine.

===== The Catawba Indians =====
Beginning in 2004, when the Catawbas were looking to operate a video gambling site on their reservation, Hutto argued in their favor, citing the potential for jobs and economic development. As then-Attorney General Henry McMaster ramped up his legal challenge to the Catawbas plan, Hutto urged compromise and settlement outside of an expensive court battle. He suggested Santee, South Carolina as an alternate place to host the location, if citizens of Rock Hill, South Carolina were so vehemently opposed to the location near them. As late as 2013, Hutto was still vocally supporting the idea of a poker casino in Santee, though by then, the Catawbas were more reluctant to look beyond their York County reservation lands.

Initially, the courts ruled in the favor of maintaining the 1993 agreement South Carolina had with the Catawbas, which would allow for them to host video poker casinos, regardless of state-law. However, in 2007, the state Supreme Court would rule against the Catawbas, effectively banning video poker on their reservations. The U.S. Supreme Court would refuse to hear an appeal on this matter from the Catawbas. In 2012, the tribe attempted further legal challenges, with the state supreme court rejecting their challenge once more in 2014.

=== Endorsements ===
Hutto endorsed Hillary Clinton in the 2016 Democratic Party presidential primaries and Joe Biden in the 2020 Democratic Party presidential primaries. He backed Mia McLeod in the 2022 South Carolina gubernatorial election over Joe Cunningham.

== Controversies ==
=== Gülen-sponsored trip ===
Hutto was one of more than 150 state lawmakers who took trips to Turkey sponsored by groups inspired by Fethullah Gulen. After the Gülen movement attempted a failed coup in 2016, the Center for Public Integrity highlighted Hutto as one of eight South Carolina legislators (six Democrats, two Republican) that took free trips to Turkey in 2012.

=== Magistrate system ===
A loophole in the South Carolina magistrate system allows judges to remain indefinitely in a holdover status, during which the nominating senator has complete authority over their employment. This situation enables potential abuses of power due to the lack of clear separation between branches of state government. Additionally, since many senators are practicing lawyers in their districts, they may have their own nominees preside over cases they are involved in. This conflict of interest is particularly problematic if the judge has not been fully confirmed.

In 2008, The State used SC's Freedom of Information Act (FOIA) to obtain copies of 10 DUI tickets in which Brad Hutto was both defense lawyer and nominating senator over a magistrate in holdover status. In each case, a DUI ticket had been written but was dismissed by the magistrate. Hutto denied any wrongdoing. Since then, Hutto has opposed the expansion FOIA.

In 2013, a highway patrol trooper suggested he often let Hutto's clients plead guilty to reduced charges because of Hutto's power over the magistrates in Orangeburg County. This continues to be a source of controversy within the Senate.

=== USC Board of Trustees ===
Hutto has been criticized by Democrats and Republicans alike for refusing to recuse himself when issues about the USC board come before the Senate, despite the fact that his law partner, Charles Williams, is a trustee.

=== Utility companies ===
Hutto has been criticized for his closeness to utility companies. In January 2018, it was revealed that Hutto attended lavish "appreciation dinners" hosted by SCANA and other utility companies in the years surrounding the Nukegate scandal. On March 27, 2018, Governor McMaster released thousands of pages of email communications of state-run utility lobbyists, some of which indicated they saw Hutto as a target for manipulation during legislative debates about whether to sell Santee Cooper. In June 2018, Hutto was one of two Senators opposing bills to cut utility costs decrying them unconstitutional. In January 2021, Hutto opposed the sale of Santee Cooper to a private entity.

=== Victim blaming ===
In 2018 and 2019, Hutto served as the defense attorney of 19-year old Bowen Turner who was accused of raping three different girls. During this defense case, victims allege they were stalked and monitored, and Hutto is reported to have emphasized a victim "didn't say no," despite her defensive scars. One of Turners alleged-victims would commit suicide in 2021 after years of harassment and bullying related to the case. Turner's well-connected father and his reduced sentences lead some to allege a sweetheart deal had taken place, and family members of victims called it another example of the good old boys network of South Carolina protecting their own. Critics suggest Hutto's behavior is similarly reflected in how he legislates around sexual assault victims and how he responds to victims' rights advocates.

South Carolina Senate
Preceded by Marshall Burns Williams	Member of the South Carolina Senate from the 40th district 1996–present	Incumbent
Preceded by Nikki G. Setzler	Minority Leader of the South Carolina Senate; 2020–present	Incumbent
Party political offices
Preceded by Bob Conley	Democratic nominee for U.S. Senator from South Carolina (Class 2); 2014	Succeeded by Jaime Harrison
