= Marion Pinckney Carnell =

American politician

Marion Pickney Carnell

Member of the South Carolina House of Representatives from the 14th district
- In office 1961–2002
- Preceded by: John W. Drummond
- Succeeded by: Michael Pitts (politician)

Personal details
- Born: March 8, 1928 Ware Shoals, South Carolina, U.S.
- Died: November 22, 2012 (aged 84) Laurens, South Carolina, U.S.
- Spouse: Sara Moore
- Children: 2
- Profession: Grocer

Marion Pinckney Carnell (March 8, 1928 – November 22, 2012) was an American politician and businessman. From 1961 to 2002, he served as a member of the South Carolina House of Representatives from the 14th District.

== Post-legislative service ==
In 2004, Carnell was named to the South Carolina Department of Transportation Commission.

== Honors and awards ==
- Marion P. Carnell Learning Center - Lander University
- Marion P. Carnell Library, Piedmont Technical College, Greenwood campus
- Carnell-Drummond-Mays Dinner - Greenwood County Democratic Party
- Marion P. Carnell Bridge
- Marion P. Carnell Award
- Ware Shoals Schools Hall of Fame 2023

== Personal life and death ==
Carnell died at age 84 in Laurens. Pallbearers at his funeral included Michael Pitts (politician), John W. Drummond, Floyd Nicholson, Nick Theodore and David H. Wilkins.
