= Luke Samuel Rankin =

American politician

Member of the South Carolina House of Representatives from the 14th district
- In office November 11, 2024 – November 9, 2026
- Preceded by: Stewart Jones
- Succeeded by: Rick Shealy

Member of the Laurens County Council from the 2nd District
- In office 2020–2024
- Preceded by: Joe Wood
- Succeeded by: Matthew Brownlee

Personal details
- Born: August 16, 1997 (age 29) Greenville, South Carolina, U.S.
- Party: Republican
- Spouse: Hope Marie (m. 2024)
- Education: Southern New Hampshire University (B.S.)

Luke Samuel Rankin is an American insurance advisor and politician. He was a member of the South Carolina House of Representatives from the 14th District, serving from 2024 to 2026. He is a member of the Republican Party.

== Political career ==
=== Previous elected office ===
Rankin has served as a member of Laurens County Council and as chair of the Laurens County Republican Party. He was endorsed in the House race by South Carolina House member John McCravy.

=== 2024 South Carolina House race ===
In March 2024, Republican incumbent Stewart Jones filed to run for South Carolina Congressional District 3 House of Representatives when incumbent Jeff Duncan announced that he would not seek re-election. Rankin filed for the South Carolina House seat vacated by Jones.

Rankin was unopposed in the Republican primary and in the general election.

Rankin serves on the House Agriculture, Natural Resources & Environmental Affairs and on the Rules committees.

Rankin sponsored the South Carolina Prenatal Equal Protection Act of 2023. The bill would have introduced new legal definitions regarding abortions and miscarriages. It would have also introduced new legal penalties for procuring an elective abortion by classifying them within the framework of assaults and homicides, This would have made women who had abortions judged medically unnecessary eligible for the death penalty. The bill attracted 21 Republican co-sponsors.

=== 2026 elections ===
Rankin was defeated in his 2026 re-election bid in the Republican primary.

== Electoral history ==
Year	Office	Type	Party	Main opponent	Party	Votes for Rankin				Result	Swing	Ref.
Year	Office	Type	Party	Main opponent	Party	Total	%	P.	±%	Result	Swing	Ref.
2020	Laurens County Council, District 2	Primary	Republican	Joe Wood (Note: Incumbent seeking re-election.)	Republican	1,037	54.0%	1st	—N/a	Won	—	
2020	Laurens County Council, District 2	General	Republican	Write-in	—	4,534	99.0%	1st	—N/a	Won	Hold	
2024	SC House of Representatives, District 14	General	Republican	Write-in	—	13,875	96.9%	1st	—N/a	Won	Hold	
2026	SC House of Representatives, District 14	Primary	Republican	Rick Shealy	Republican	2,050	39.9%	2nd	—N/a	Lost	—	
