= John W. Drummond =

American politician

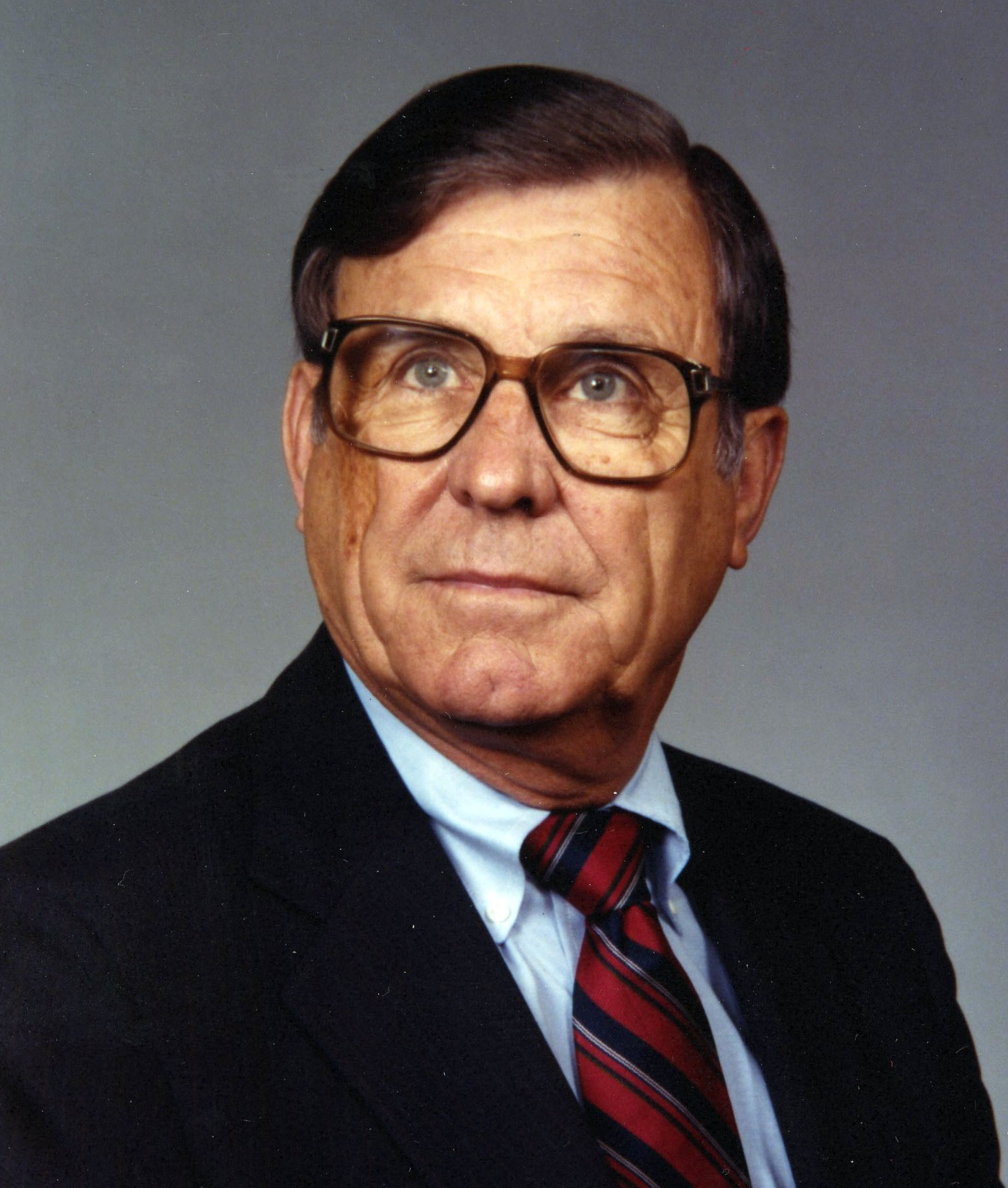

Member of the South Carolina Senate from the 10th district
- In office 1966–2008
- Preceded by: Constituency established
- Succeeded by: Floyd Nicholson

Member of the South Carolina House of Representatives
- In office 1965–1966
- Preceding: Marion Pinckney Carnell
- Preceded by: Marion Pinckney Carnell

Personal details
- Born: September 29, 1919 Greenwood, South Carolina, U.S.
- Died: September 3, 2016 (aged 96) Ninety Six, South Carolina, U.S.
- Party: Democratic
- Spouse: Holly Self (m. 1947, d. 1999)
- Profession: President, Drummond Oil

John Willie Drummond (September 29, 1919 – September 3, 2016) was an American politician. He was a Democratic member of the South Carolina Senate, who represented the 10th District from 1966 through 2008. He was also a member of the South Carolina House of Representatives from 1965 through 1966. One of John's brothers (Cal Drummond) was an MLB umpire for the American League from 1960 to 1969.

== Early life and military service ==
One of seven children of James William and Fannie Smith Drummond, John Drummond was born in Greenwood, South Carolina, though at some point the family moved to Ninety Six, South Carolina.

In World War II, Drummond held the rank of captain and piloted a P-47D Thunderbolt with the nose art "Raid Hot Mama" 405th Fighter Group. He was shot down in 1944 near Giéville, France. During his time of service Drummond received the Decorated Distinguished Flying Cross, two Purple Hearts, nine Air Medals, and three Battle Stars.

After the war he returned to Ninety Six and married Holly Self. They had three children: John H. "Brick," and twins Richard S. "Dick," and Robert S. "Bob." He initially sold doughnuts at Golden Rings before he started Drummond Oil, an oil distribution business.

== Political career and death ==
Drummond was elected a Democrat to the South Carolina House of Representatives in 1965. In 1966, he was elected to the South Carolina Senate where he would serve until his retirement in 2008, representing Senate District 10, including the counties of Abbeville, Greenwood, and Laurens.

During his service he served on numerous committees, including as committee chairman for Ethics, Labor, Commerce, and Industry; Game and Forestry; and the Finance committees. From 1996 to 2001, Drummond served as the President Pro Tempore of the Senate. In 2001, the newly-minted Republican senate majority changed the body's rules regarding chairmanships and Hugh Leatherman replaced Drummond as chairman of the finance committee. Drummond helped preside over efforts by the Senate to remove the Confederate Flag from the State House grounds.

Drummond died on September 3, 2016.

South Carolina House of Representatives
Preceded by Raymond Isaiah Abbott; Marion Pinckney Carnell	Member of the South Carolina House of Representatives from the Greenwood County district 1965–1967; Served alongside: Judson Freeman Ayers, Jr.	Succeeded by Marion Pinckney Carnell
South Carolina Senate
Preceded by District created	Member of the South Carolina Senate from the 25th district 1967–1969	Succeeded by District abolished
Preceded by John Alfred Martin	Member of the South Carolina Senate from the 6th district 1969–1973	Succeeded by Donald Harry Holland; Samuel Brooks Mendenhall; Frank Laney Roddey
Preceded by Harry Aubrey Chapman, Jr. Charles Gideon Garrett; Richard Wilson Riley; Thomas Albert Wofford	Member of the South Carolina Senate from the 3rd district 1973–1985	Succeeded by Thomas Edmond Garrison, Jr.
Preceded by Edward Eli Saleeby	Member of the South Carolina Senate from the 10th district 1985–2009	Succeeded by Floyd Nicholson
Preceded by Marshall Burns Williams	President pro tempore of the South Carolina Senate; 1996–2001	Succeeded by Glenn F. McConnell
