= Torigny-les-Villes =

- Commune
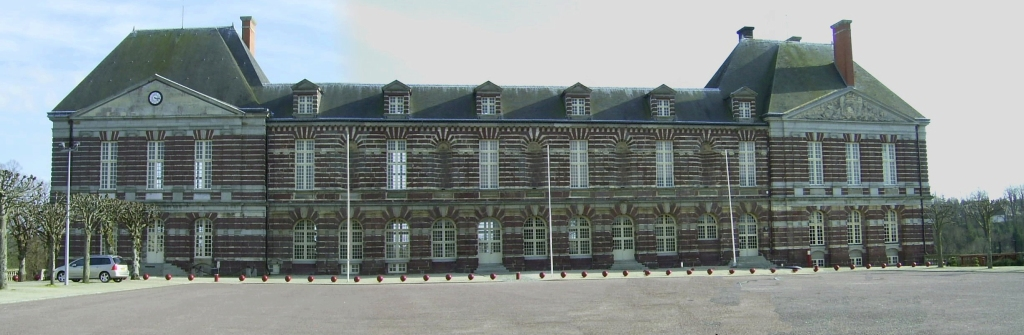
- Château des Matignon
- Location of Torigny-les-Villes
- Location within France Location within Normandy
- Coordinates: 49°02′06″N 0°58′44″W
- Country: France
- Region: Normandy
- Department: Manche
- Arrondissement: Saint-Lô
- Canton: Condé-sur-Vire
- Intercommunality: Saint-Lô Agglo

Government
  - Mayor (2020–2026): Michaël Grandin
- Area^{1}: 39.23 km^{2} (15.15 sq mi)
- Population (2023): 4,444
  - Density: 113.3/km^{2} (293.4/sq mi)
- Time zone: UTC+01:00 (CET)
  - Summer (DST): UTC+02:00 (CEST)
- INSEE/Postal code: 50601 /50160
- ^{1} French Land Register data, which excludes lakes, ponds, glaciers > 1 km^{2} (0.386 sq mi or 247 acres) and river estuaries.

Torigny-les-Villes (French pronunciation: [tɔʁiɲi le vil]) is a commune in the department of Manche in northwestern France.

Torigni-sur-Vire is listed as a Village étape.

== History ==
The present commune was established on 1 January 2016 by merger of the former small communes of Brectouville, Giéville, Guilberville, and Torigni-sur-Vire (the seat).

During the Middle Ages, Torigni-sur-Vire was part of the Duchy of Normandy and the home of the chronicler Robert of Torigni.

== Population ==
Population data refer to the area corresponding with the commune as of January 2025.

Historical population
| Year | Pop. | ±% p.a. |
|---|---|---|
| 1968 | 4,173 | — |
| 1975 | 4,262 | +0.30% |
| 1982 | 4,448 | +0.61% |
| 1990 | 4,298 | −0.43% |
| 1999 | 4,143 | −0.41% |
| 2007 | 4,132 | −0.03% |
| 2012 | 4,257 | +0.60% |
| 2017 | 4,352 | +0.44% |
| 2023 | 4,444 | +0.35% |
Source: INSEE

== See also ==
- Communes of the Manche department
