= Stewart Jones =

American politician (born 1983)

Member of the South Carolina House of Representatives from the 14th district
- In office January 2019 – November 2024
- Preceded by: Michael Pitts
- Succeeded by: Luke Samuel Rankin

Personal details
- Born: March 20, 1983 (age 43) Greenwood, South Carolina, U.S.
- Party: Republican
- Website: Campaign website

Stewart Olin Jones (born March 20, 1983) is an American businessman and politician. He is a former member of Laurens County Council serving from 2014 to 2019, and a former member of the South Carolina House of Representatives from the 14th District, serving from 2019 to 2024. He is a member of the Republican party.

== Political career ==
=== South Carolina House of Representatives ===
Jones was a founding and former member of the South Carolina Freedom Caucus, and an Executive Committee Member of the SC House Family Caucus. He chaired the Early Childhood Development Committee. Jones served as 2nd Vice Chair of the House Interstate Cooperation Committee, and also served on the House Education and Public Works Committee.

Jones was one of three legislators who wrote to the Governor on April 15, 2020, saying "we cannot support labeling businesses as 'non-essential' — much less ordering them to close." On April 29, the three lawmakers including Jones urged House Speaker Jay Lucas, "to reconvene members of the House of Representatives, under the belief the House might be able to vote to end Gov. McMaster's newest "State of Emergency" in response to the coronavirus."

In December 2021, passed 3126, a bill to ban federal COVID vaccine mandates and a proviso to prohibit forced masking, COVID vaccines, and COVID tests in South Carolina K-12 schools. He also passed provisos to ban forced masking, COVID testing and vaccines in state funded universities and schools.

In 2021, Jones led 36 lawmakers on a petition demanding the state school board association's withdrawal from the National School Boards Association.

Jones supported the Fetal Heartbeat Bill, which was signed into law with exceptions. In 2023, Jones was one of 21 Republican co-sponsors of the South Carolina Prenatal Equal Protection Act of 2023, which would make women who had abortions eligible for the death penalty. When asked about the possibility of this legislation leading to a death penalty sentencing in an interview, Jones said that "I don't believe anything like that could ever happen...and I would not support anything like that."

Jones helped to pass the First Steps Act of South Carolina in August 2023 "ensuring every child in South Carolina has an opportunity to have a great education and a future."

=== U.S. House of Representatives campaign ===
In March 2024, Jones filed to run for South Carolina Congressional District 3 House of Representatives when incumbent Jeff Duncan announced that he would not seek re-election. Among the field of seven candidates vying for the Republican nomination, Jones placed 3rd in the June primary. Jones did not seek re-election for South Carolina State House of Representatives and was succeeded in the State House by Luke Samuel Rankin.
