= Guilberville =

- Part of Torigny-les-Villes
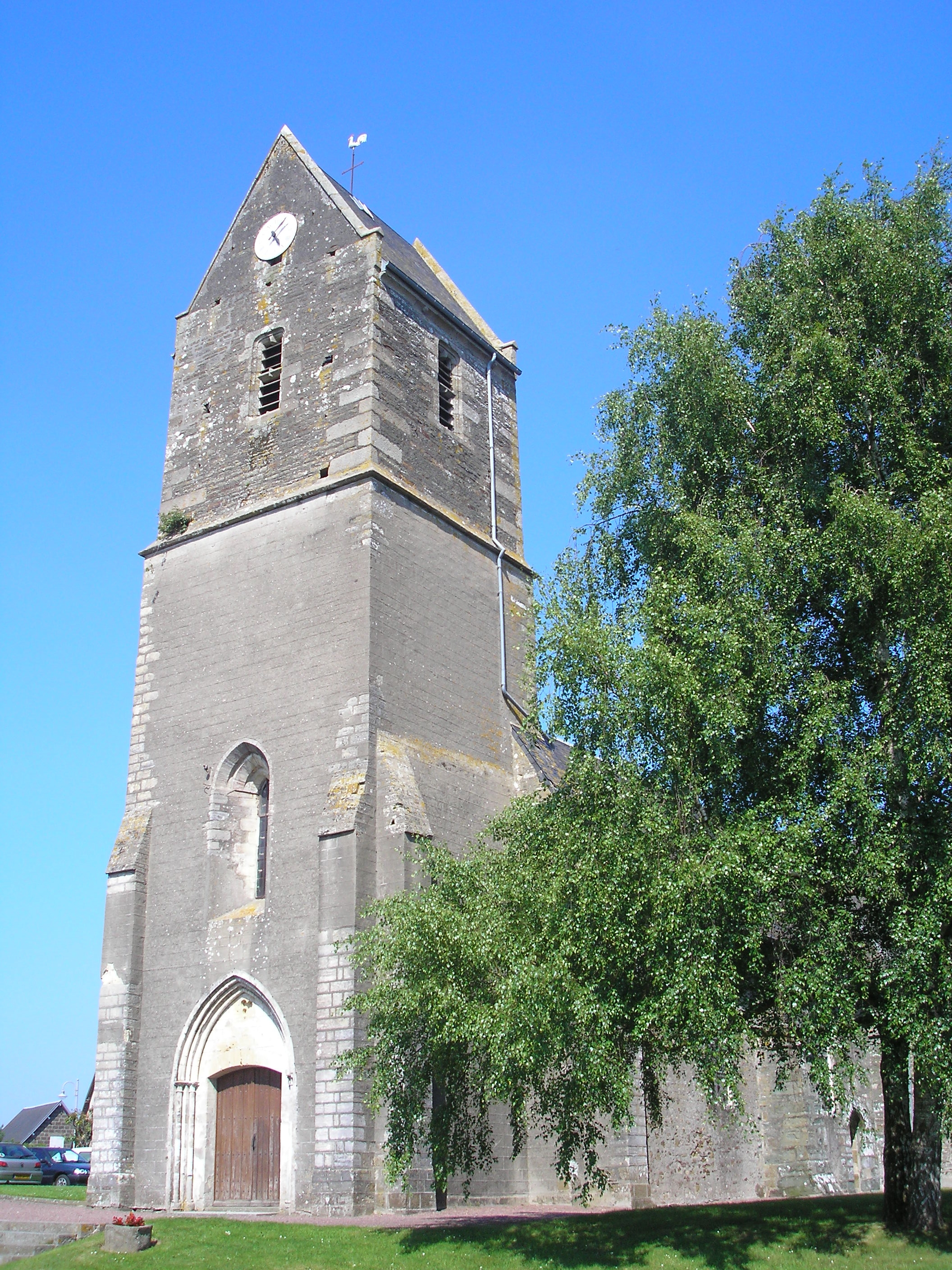
- The church of Saint-Mathurin
- Location of Guilberville
- Location within France Location within Normandy
- Coordinates: 48°59′20″N 0°56′47″W
- Country: France
- Region: Normandy
- Department: Manche
- Arrondissement: Saint-Lô
- Canton: Condé-sur-Vire
- Commune: Torigny-les-Villes
- Area^{1}: 22.15 km^{2} (8.55 sq mi)
- Elevation: 149 m (489 ft)
- Highest elevation: 262 m (860 ft)
- Lowest elevation: 70 m (230 ft)
- Population (2022): 1,247
  - Density: 56.30/km^{2} (145.8/sq mi)
- Demonym: Guilbervillais
- Time zone: UTC+01:00 (CET)
  - Summer (DST): UTC+02:00 (CEST)
- Postal code: 50160
- ^{1} French Land Register data, which excludes lakes, ponds, glaciers > 1 km^{2} (0.386 sq mi or 247 acres) and river estuaries.

Guilberville (French pronunciation: [ɡilbɛʁvil]) is a former commune in the Manche department in north-western France. On 1 January 2016, it was merged into the new commune of Torigny-les-Villes. The population was 1,247 in 2022.

== See also ==
- Communes of the Manche department
