= Michael Pitts (politician) =

American politician

Member of the South Carolina House of Representatives from the 14th district
- In office 2003–2019
- Preceded by: Marion Pinckney Carnell
- Succeeded by: Stewart Jones

Personal details
- Born: December 31, 1955 (age 70) Greenwood, South Carolina, U.S.
- Party: Republican
- Spouse: Susan W. Slay (m. 1974)
- Children: 3
- Education: Lander College (BS)

Michael Pitts (born December 31, 1955) is an American politician, judge, and law enforcement officer. From 2003 to 2019, he served as a member of the South Carolina House of Representatives from the 14th District. He is a member of the Republican Party.

In 2019, Pitts was nominated to lead the state Conservation Bank, though he withdrew his nomination. Later that year, Pitts was successfully nominated to be a magistrate judge for Laurens County, South Carolina.

Pitts is married to Susan W. Slay, and they have three children. He graduated from Lander College in 1985.
