= Marshall Burns Williams =

American politician

President pro tempore of the South Carolina Senate
- In office January 10, 1989 – December 28, 1995
- Succeeded by: John W. Drummond

Member of the South Carolina Senate from the 40th district
- In office 1953 – December 28, 1995
- Succeeded by: Brad Hutto

Member of the South Carolina House of Representatives from Orangeburg County
- In office 1947–1953

Personal details
- Born: January 17, 1912 Orangeburg County, South Carolina, U.S.
- Died: December 28, 1995 (aged 83)
- Spouse: Margaret Shecut (m. 1942)
- Children: 4
- Education: University of South Carolina (BS, LLB, JD)

Marshall Burns Williams (January 17, 1912 – December 28, 1995) was an American politician who served as a member of the South Carolina House of Representatives and the South Carolina Senate.

== Early life and education ==
Williams received a BS degree in 1933, an LL.B in 1936, and a JD in 1970, all from the University of South Carolina.

During World War II, Williams served in the United States Navy, attaining the rank of Lieutenant Commander.

== Political career ==
Williams served in the South Carolina House of Representatives from 1947 to 1953. He went on to serve in the South Carolina Senate from 1953 to 1995.

Williams served as Chairman of the Senate Judiciary Committee. In January 1989, he was elected to serve as president pro tempore of the South Carolina Senate.

== Death ==
Williams died on December 28, 1995, while still serving as president pro tempore. He had served in the State legislature for close to 50 years.
