= Brectouville =

- Part of Torigny-les-Villes
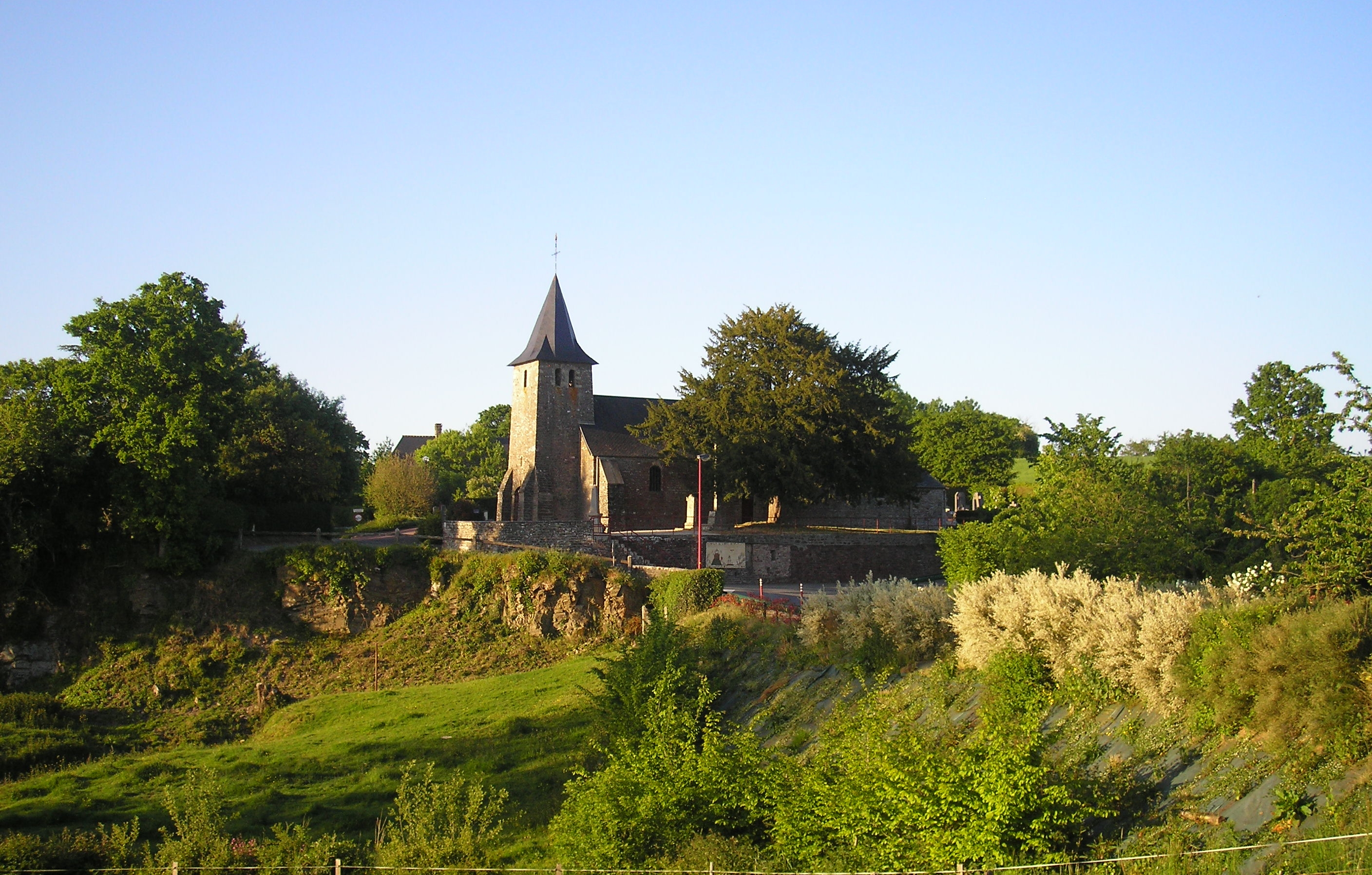
- The church of Saint-Pierre
- Location of Brectouville
- Location within France Location within Normandy
- Coordinates: 49°01′22″N 1°01′16″W
- Country: France
- Region: Normandy
- Department: Manche
- Arrondissement: Saint-Lô
- Canton: Condé-sur-Vire
- Commune: Torigny-les-Villes
- Area^{1}: 3.74 km^{2} (1.44 sq mi)
- Elevation: 85 m (279 ft)
- Highest elevation: 137 m (449 ft)
- Lowest elevation: 29 m (95 ft)
- Population (2023): 154
  - Density: 41.2/km^{2} (107/sq mi)
- Time zone: UTC+01:00 (CET)
  - Summer (DST): UTC+02:00 (CEST)
- Postal code: 50160
- ^{1} French Land Register data, which excludes lakes, ponds, glaciers > 1 km^{2} (0.386 sq mi or 247 acres) and river estuaries.

Brectouville (French pronunciation: [bʁɛktuvil]) is a former commune in the Manche department in Normandy in northwestern France. On 1 January 2016, it was merged into the new commune of Torigny-les-Villes.

== See also ==
- Communes of the Manche department
