= Torigni-sur-Vire =

- Part of Torigny-les-Villes
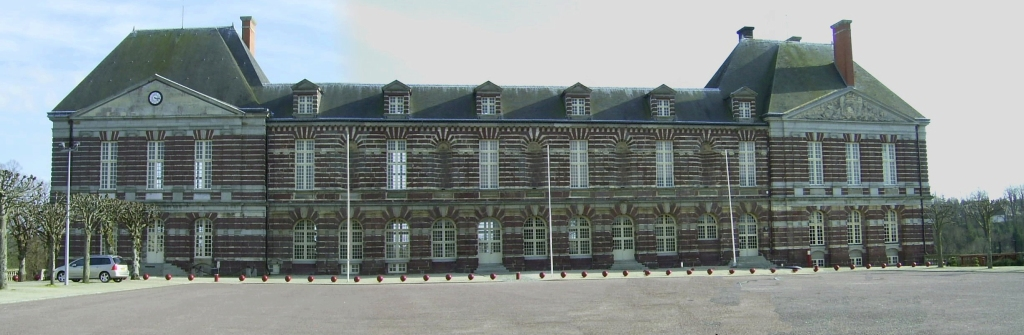
- Location of Torigni-sur-Vire
- Location within France Location within Normandy
- Coordinates: 49°02′10″N 0°58′42″W
- Country: France
- Region: Normandy
- Department: Manche
- Arrondissement: Saint-Lô
- Canton: Condé-sur-Vire
- Commune: Torigny-les-Villes
- Area^{1}: 3.01 km^{2} (1.16 sq mi)
- Elevation: 78 m (256 ft)
- Highest elevation: 139 m (456 ft)
- Lowest elevation: 53 m (174 ft)
- Population (2022): 2,351
  - Density: 781/km^{2} (2,020/sq mi)
- Demonym: Torignais.e
- Time zone: UTC+01:00 (CET)
  - Summer (DST): UTC+02:00 (CEST)
- Postal code: 50160
- ^{1} French Land Register data, which excludes lakes, ponds, glaciers > 1 km^{2} (0.386 sq mi or 247 acres) and river estuaries.

Torigni-sur-Vire (French pronunciation: [tɔʁiɲi syʁ viʁ], "Torigni-on-Vire"), also known as Torigny, is a former commune in the Manche department, Normandy, northwestern France. It was reformed in 2016 to create Torigny-les-Villes and houses that commune's seat of government. The town is home to the Château des Matignon.

== History ==
During the Middle Ages, Torigni was a lordship (seigneur de Torigny) within the Duchy of Normandy. Margaret of Burgundy sold it to Pierre the Fat, chamberlain of Philip IV, for 9500 livres tournois (about 768 kg or 1,700 lb of fine silver). It was also the home of the 12th-century chronicler Robert of Torigni.

On 1 January 2016, it was merged into the new commune of Torigny-les-Villes.

== Heraldry ==
Arms of Torigni-sur-Vire	The arms of Torigni-sur-Vire are blazoned : Azure, a 2-towered castle enflamed argent. Canting arms. Form "rébus"=Tour (tower) +ignis (fire) = towers aflame. Actually, the name Torigni comes from low latin:Toriniacum, domain of Taurin.)

== See also ==
- Communes of the Manche department
- Marble of Thorigny
