= Rick Shealy =

American politician

Member of the South Carolina House of Representatives from the 14th district
- Incumbent
- Assumed office November 9, 2026
- Preceded by: Luke Samuel Rankin

Personal details
- Party: Republican
- Website: Campaign website

Rick Shealy is an American politician. A member of the Republican Party, he is the member for the 14th district of the South Carolina House of Representatives. He was elected at the 2026 election. He is a farmer.
