= Giéville =

- Part of Torigny-les-Villes
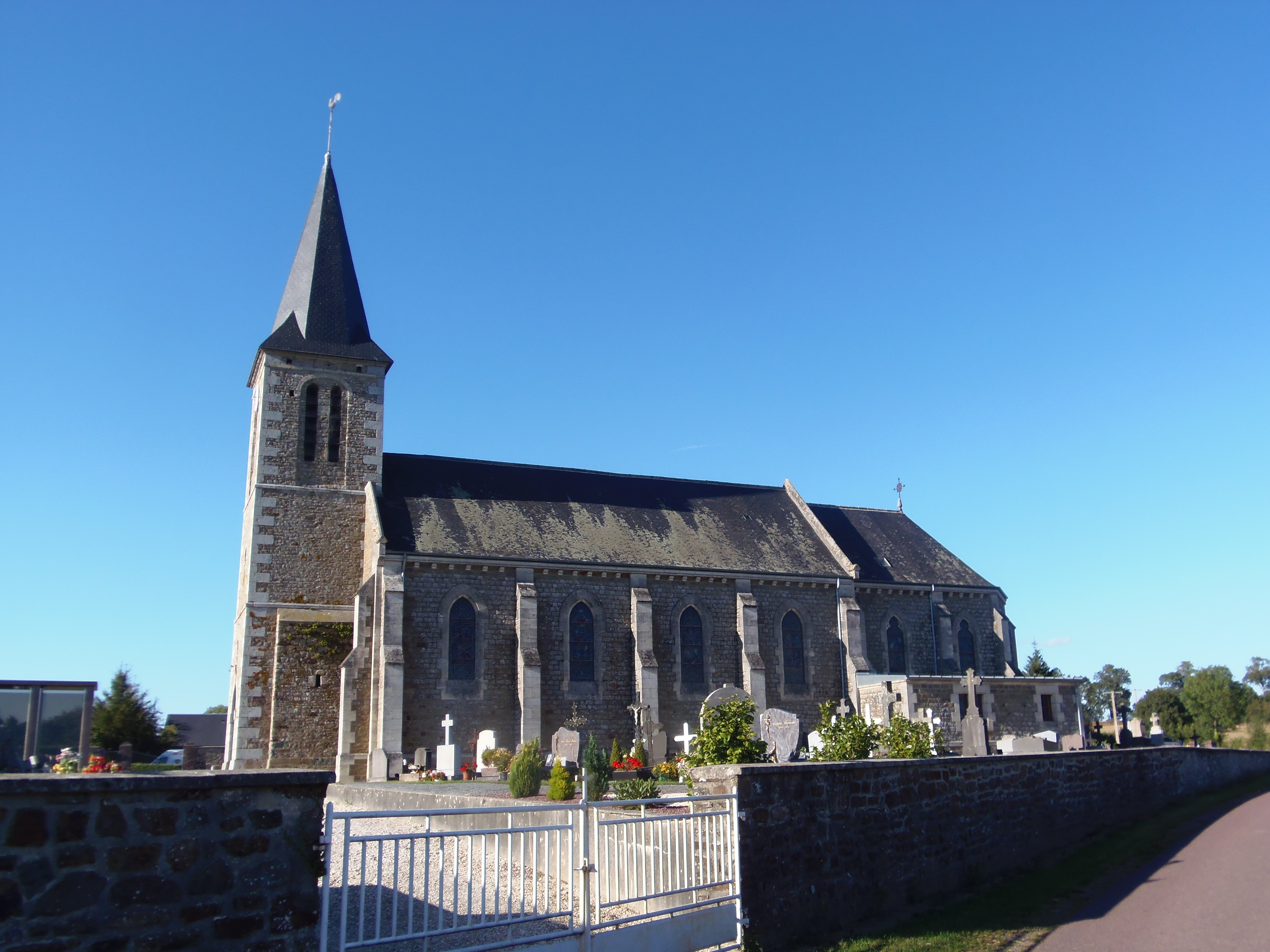
- The church of Saint-Martin
- Location of Giéville
- Location within France Location within Normandy
- Coordinates: 49°00′54″N 0°58′42″W
- Country: France
- Region: Normandy
- Department: Manche
- Arrondissement: Saint-Lô
- Canton: Condé-sur-Vire
- Commune: Torigny-les-Villes
- Area^{1}: 10.33 km^{2} (3.99 sq mi)
- Elevation: 125 m (410 ft)
- Highest elevation: 150 m (490 ft)
- Lowest elevation: 53 m (174 ft)
- Population (2022): 689
  - Density: 66.7/km^{2} (173/sq mi)
- Demonym: Giévillais
- Time zone: UTC+01:00 (CET)
  - Summer (DST): UTC+02:00 (CEST)
- Postal code: 50160
- ^{1} French Land Register data, which excludes lakes, ponds, glaciers > 1 km^{2} (0.386 sq mi or 247 acres) and river estuaries.

Giéville (French pronunciation: [ʒjevil]) is a former commune in the Manche department in north-western France. On 1 January 2016, it was merged into the new commune of Torigny-les-Villes. The commune has a population of 689 people (2022).

== See also ==
- Communes of the Manche department
