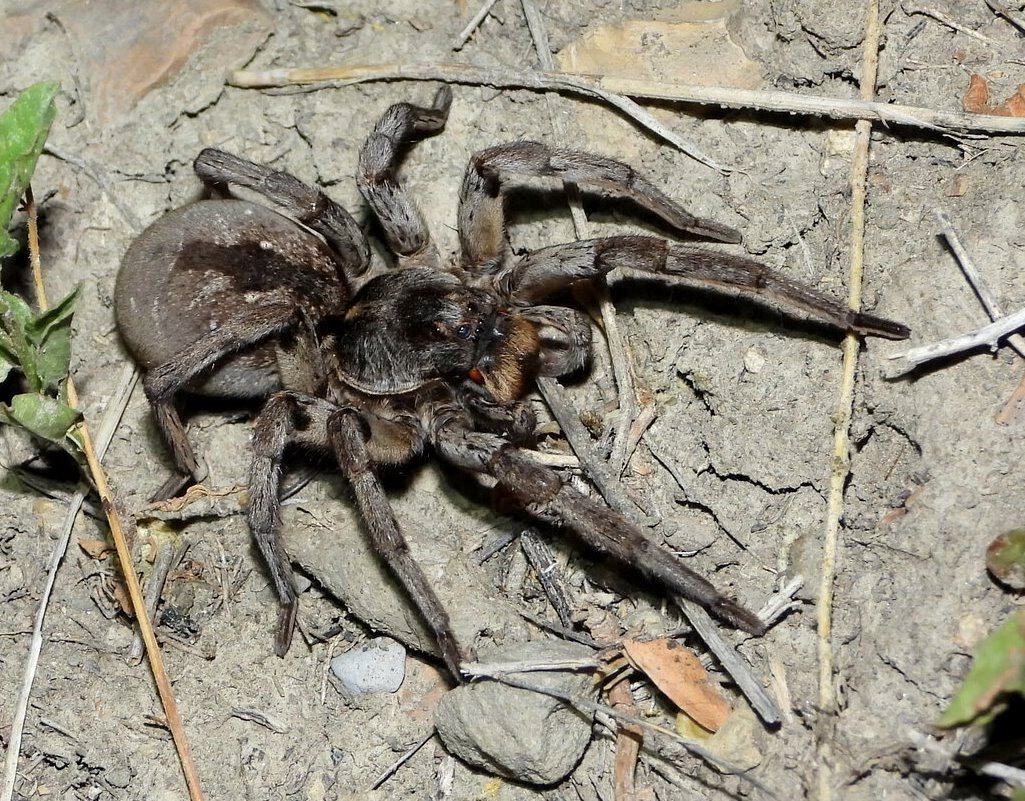
- Adult female in Colorado

Scientific classification
- Kingdom: Animalia
- Phylum: Arthropoda
- Subphylum: Chelicerata
- Class: Arachnida
- Order: Araneae
- Infraorder: Araneomorphae
- Family: Lycosidae
- Genus: Hogna
- Species: H. carolinensis

Binomial name
- Hogna carolinensis (Walckenaer, 1805)

Synonyms
- Lycosa tarentula carolinensis Walckenaer, 1805; Hogna vehemens (Walckenaer, 1837)

= Hogna carolinensis =

Species of spider

Hogna carolinensis, commonly-known as the Carolina wolf spider and giant wolf spider, is found across North America. It is the largest of the wolf spiders in North America, typically measuring at 18–20 mm (0.7–0.8 in) for males and 22–35 mm (0.9–1.4 in) for females.

The Carolina wolf spider is mottled brown with a dark underside. Males have orange coloration on their sides. They live in either self-made burrows or ones they find. Like all wolf spiders, H. carolinensis does not make a web to catch prey. They hunt by ambushing prey from their burrows. These spiders are particularly-known for the females carrying their egg-sacs on their bodies during the incubation period. The Carolina wolf spider also has a unique type of venom that both paralyzes their prey and helps prevent microbes from their prey infecting them. H. carolinensis is able to thermoregulate quite well. This is particularly important for animals that inhabit desert ecosystems or other locations with large temperature swings.

== Naming ==
Hogna carolinensis is commonly known as the Carolina wolf spider. Historically, it was known as Lycosa carolinensis, but refinement in taxonomy in the later half of the 20th century led to L. carolinensis, among many other spiders, being reclassified to the current genus, Hogna.

== Description ==
The Carolina wolf spider is the largest wolf spider in North America. Adult females can reach 22–35 mm (0.87–1.4 in) and adult males 18–20 mm (0.71–0.79 in). They are an overall light-brown color, but have darker-brown patterning on their backs. Their undersides are a darker black and the males can have orange coloration on the sides of their abdomen.

The Carolina wolf spider has a few identifying characteristics. The orange coloration on the males is a good way to identify a male Carolina wolf spider. Females carry the egg-sac with them during incubation, so females can be identified in this way during the breeding-season. Additionally, the eyes of these spiders reflect light, which is an especially good identifier when encountering one at night.

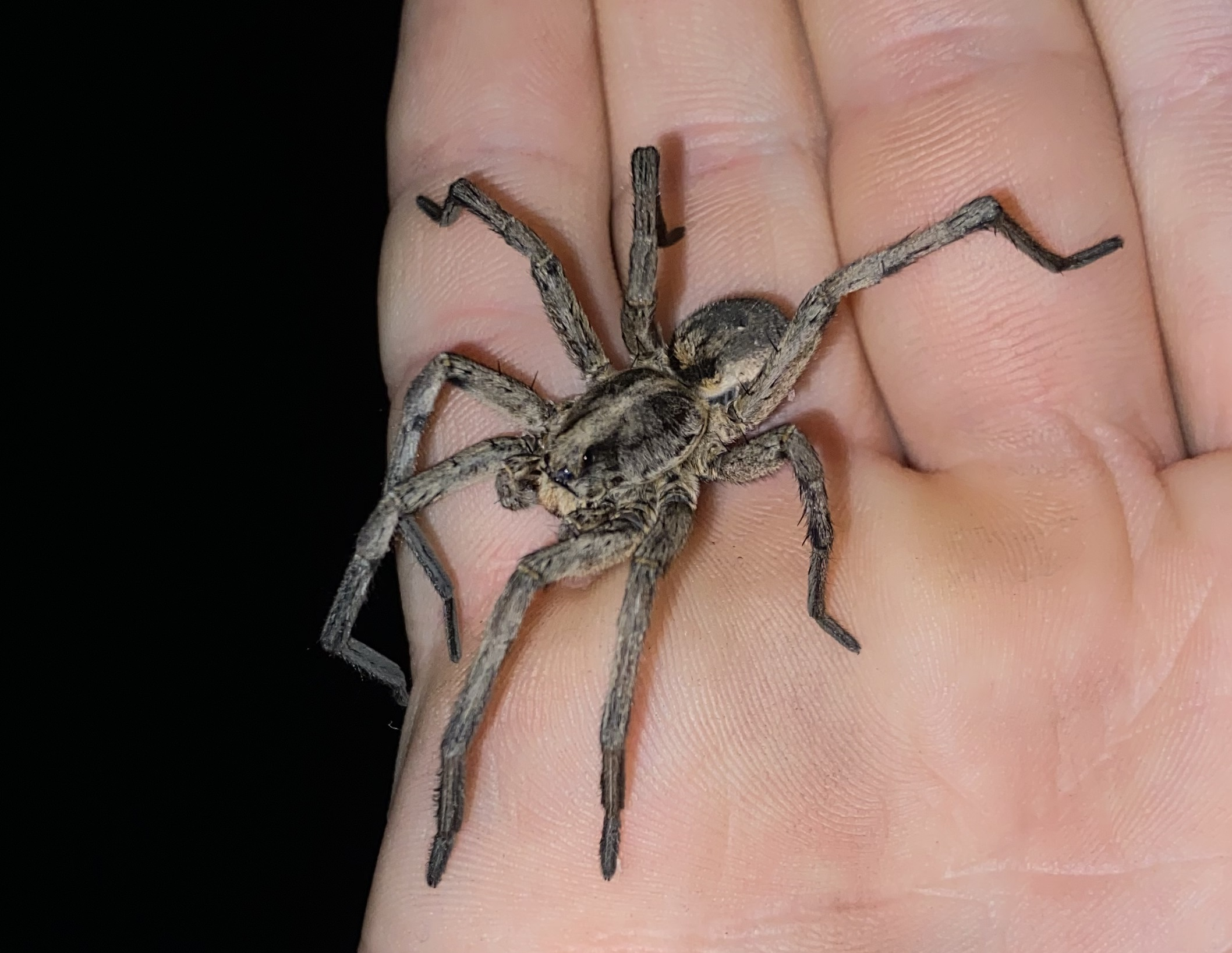
Male caught in Des Moines, Iowa

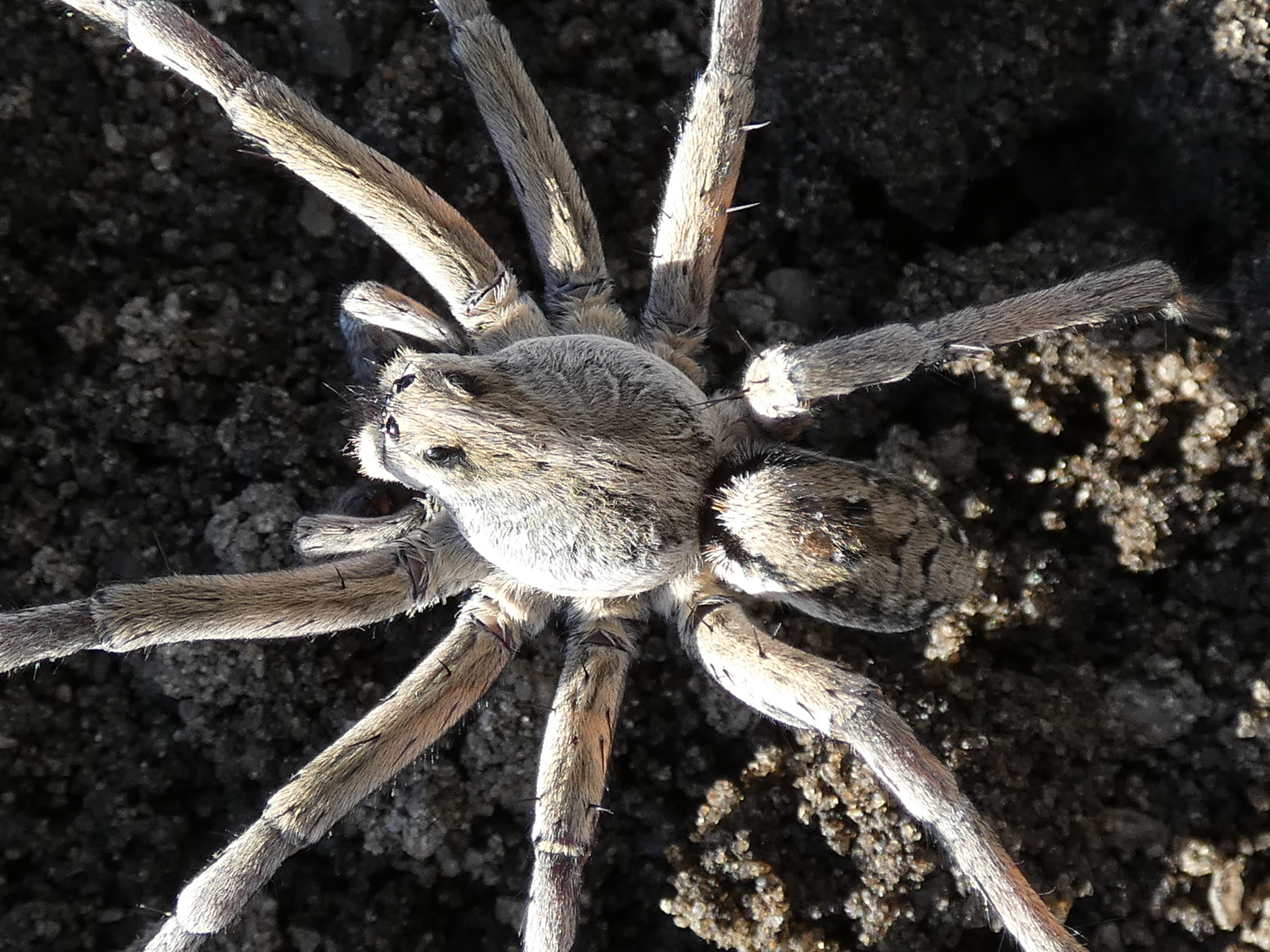
Adult male (dorsal)

== Habitat and distribution ==
=== Distribution ===
Carolina wolf spiders are found throughout a large part of North America. This includes, but is not limited to, South Carolina, Kansas, all Great Lake States, and the American Southwest. Most research on Carolina wolf spiders, though they are present in many ecosystems, has been conducted on the desert-dwelling ones.

=== Habitat ===
The Carolina wolf spider is found all over the North American continent. Therefore, they are able to inhabit many types of geography and topography. Research suggests that these spiders prefer flatter and more open areas. In fact, researchers noticed that the home range of spiders (distance they frequent from their burrow) would be cut off by sharp topographical changes in desert areas.

== Diet ==
=== Prey ===
Carolina wolf spiders usually feed on insects and other small invertebrates. They typically eat grasshoppers and crickets, among other arthropods. Carolina wolf spiders will sometimes inhabit the areas around human homes, and will take advantage of available prey like cockroaches and other pests. Additionally, they have been observed with juvenile Texas banded geckos as prey, implying they are also able to catch and consume small vertebrate species.

=== Hunting-tactics ===
Carolina wolf spiders do not catch their prey within webs. They sit on the edge of their burrow or in some other good ambush-location, and attack their prey when it gets near. If the spider is not in its burrow when it catches its prey, it will feed on its prey before returning to the burrow. If a Carolina wolf spider is in its burrow when it catches its prey, it will drag it down into the depth, holding on to the prey with its chelicerae (the "jaws").

== Burrows ==
Carolina wolf spiders tend to live in burrows. They either make their own burrow or find and inhabit one already made. To construct their own burrow, the Carolina wolf spider digs out a small area, spins a web to act as a mat that will hold the structure. The spider then keeps digging out areas in this manner until they create a burrow that is a sufficient size. Though they are diggers, Carolina wolf spiders do not have specialized digging-anatomy, so it is sometimes easier to take over the burrow of other small organisms. Occasionally, spiders take over the burrow of their mother if she has died while her offspring are still spiderlings.

Carolina wolf spider burrows vary in size and shape. Some are tubes that are dug straight down while others have bends. Researchers think the variety in size and shape has to do, in part, with spiders digging the path of least resistance, though there is some correlation between spider and burrow size. In addition to the burrows themselves, Carolina wolf spiders also create turrets around the entrance to their burrows using sticks, grasses, leaves, pebbles, small animal droppings, and mud. The exact purpose of these turrets is not known, but they are hypothesized to be a lookout or early warning system for potential predators. Carolina wolf spiders tend to dig and improve their burrows in the early part of their activity season.

More than offering a safe place for the spiders to live, these burrows are important microclimates for the Carolina wolf spiders. As the burrows go deep in the ground, some as deep as 30cm, they tend to be about 4°C cooler than the temperature on the surface. This is especially important for the spiders that live in deserts and other places with hot climates.

The burrows are the main base for the Carolina wolf spider, and they typically have claim over the area that is about a meter out from their burrow. They do not typically interact with others of their kind outside of mating and early offspring rearing, so burrows are dispersed randomly, no matter the environment, outside of the range of other spiders’ burrows.

It has been noted that when Carolina wolf spiders are brought in to lab conditions for observations, they do not burrow as well as out in the wild.

== Reproduction and life cycle ==
=== Reproduction ===
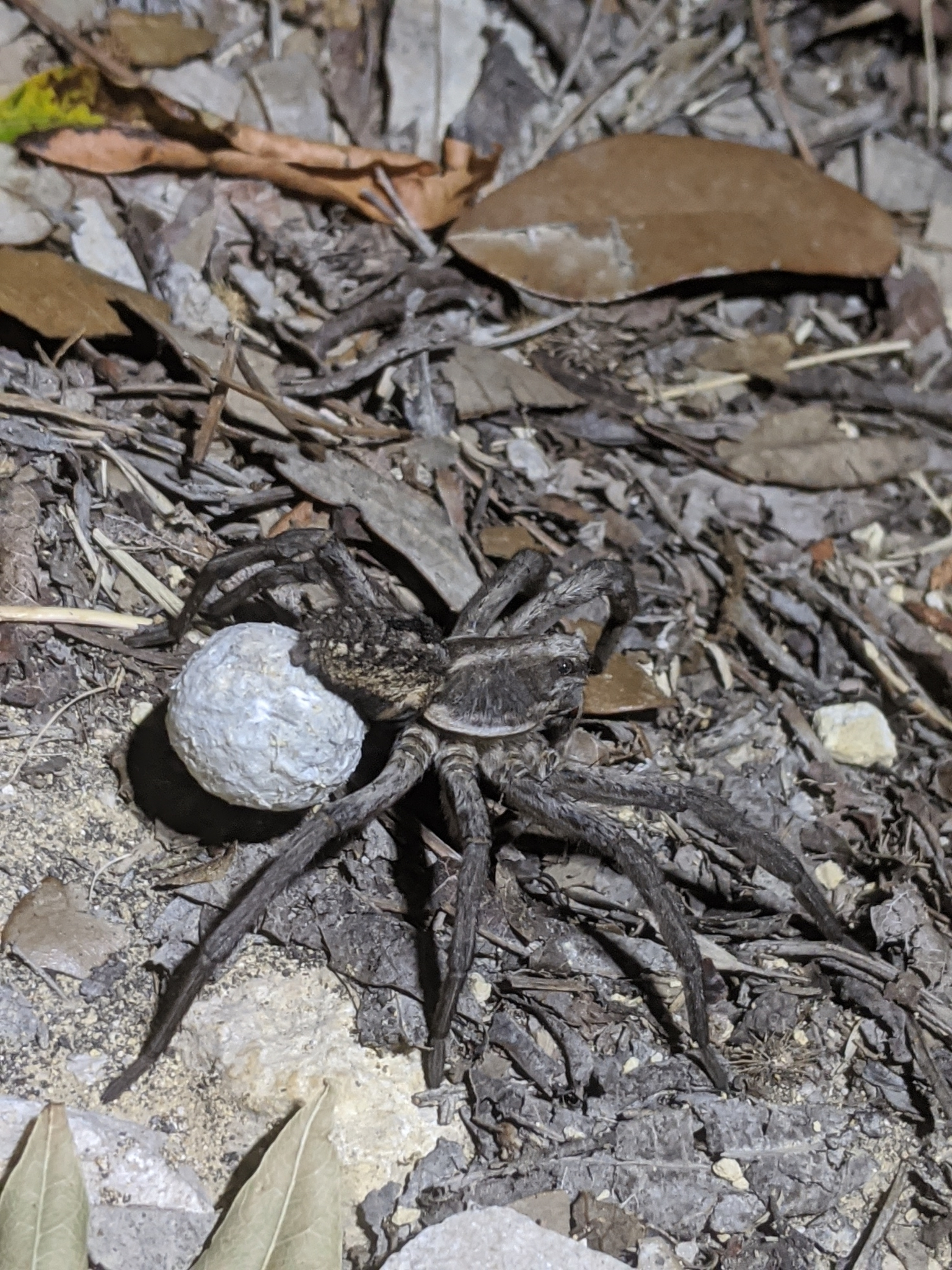
Female holding the egg-sac

Carolina wolf spiders mate in late summer. The females carry the eggs, the sacs attached to their abdomen, during the approximately two week incubation period. There tends to be two main egg carrying seasons, the first in late July and the second in late August. While incubating the eggs, female spiders are often seen "sunning" the egg sacs. This is observed when the spider is sitting near the top of their burrow with their heads down and their abdomen and egg sac, sticking up. The Carolina wolf spider is nocturnal, therefore this behavior is observed during night hours. Researchers do not know why this behavior occurs, but they believe the warmth helps the eggs to hatch more quickly. When the eggs hatch, there are about 200 spiderlings per sac.

=== Life cycle ===
Spiderlings are born near the end of summer and, barring exceptional circumstances like flooding, stay with their mother for the first six days of their life. During that time they learn different cues and behaviors from their mother and subsist on the remains of the yolk from where they emerged. The spiders then disperse and find their own burrows or places to live. As immature spiders, the spiderlings go through multiple instars (growing stages) until they reach breeding age at about three years. During their third summer, the spiders will reproduce for the first time. Males die that same summer, but female spiders can live for multiple breeding seasons. As a result, adult male percentage peaks in June and adult female percentage peaks in July. During the year, Carolina wolf spiders are active from March to October, and they hibernate from November through February.

== Mating ==
=== Courtship ===
During courtship, a male will approach a female and make the first move: the male will enter into a courtship posture by extending his forelegs. The male will then extend his palps and vibrate his abdomen, repeating this a few times. Then, depending on the movement of the female, the male will approach. If the female is moving around quickly, the male will too. The male will also mimic her movement speed if she is moving slowly. Once the male is close enough to the female, he will carefully prod her with his forelegs. The female will react in one of two ways: she will either fight or not. If the female fights the male and does not kill him, he will keep pursuing her. If she fights and then pursues after the male, he will flee and try to escape her attack. If she does not fight at all and instead flees, the male will follow her in order to continue the courtship. If no female is present, male/male courting can occur.

=== Copulation ===
If the female is amenable to mating, she will face the male and elevate the front legs on one side of her body, waiting for the male to copulate. The male will then insert his palps several times into the female. After copulation, the male will quickly run away so he is not attacked and eaten by the female. It has been observed in a lab setting that a female will court with a male if she has already copulated with a different male, but she will not pursue a second mating.

=== Female/female interaction ===
As these spiders are mostly-solitary, there is not much interaction between females. When female Carolina wolf spiders do interact, their behavior can range from merely making foreleg contact to cannibalism. Typically, they will make threatening motions like extending their forelegs, spreading their chelicerae, or drumming their palpi at each other.

== Social behavior ==
Though Carolina wolf spiders are not social, research has shown that the offspring that stays with and socializes with their mother after birth have better hunting-skills and bigger brains.

== Predators ==
Though excellent hunters, Carolina wolf spiders also find themselves subject to predation. As Carolina wolf spiders are widespread across the continent, they have a myriad of predators. Their predators include a variety of lizards, amphibians, wasps, and spider-eating birds. Carolina wolf spiders are prey to large arthropods, including scorpions, as well as owls and coyotes. One researcher witnessed a group of predatory ants enter a spider's burrow, consume the spider, and take over the burrow as their own.

== Physiology ==
=== Locomotion ===
There is not a significant difference of the sprint-speed, (i.e. the speed at which they will escape perceived threats) of the Carolina wolf spider between males and females. There is, however, a difference in chances a male or a female will flee from a threat. Spiders will flee to try and get far enough from a predator in hopes that they will lose interest in them. Male Carolina wolf spiders flee significantly more than females. Researchers believe that this is due to Carolina wolf spider burrowing habits. Male spiders do not own burrows as often as females, so they are not able to find a safe escape in their burrows as frequently as their female counterparts. Interestingly, the speed of the spider and flee distance are positively correlated, meaning that the spiders that flee farther are able to run away faster, both mechanisms helping their antipredatory reactions.

=== Senses ===
In addition to sight and olfactory-senses, Carolina wolf spiders will react to vibrations they sense. They will either return to their burrow, if available, or they will flee.

=== Thermoregulation ===
Carolina wolf spiders are able to thermoregulate very well, which is especially important for those that inhabit desert ecosystems or other locations with large temperature swings. They are able to acclimate to any sized (within reason) temperature change in 1.5–3 days. They do this by increasing their oxygen consumption levels to very high amounts and then lowering it to the appropriate level for that temperature. This adaptation is helpful because it reduces the shifts in food and water needs that in other spiders is associated with large temperature shifts. In the short term, before they have thermoregulated, Carolina wolf spiders are able to keep cool by keeping their abdomens close to water and drinking large amounts of water. These water sources are especially important because Carolina wolf spiders need outside sources of water as they are not able to derive water metabolically.

== Bites to humans and other animals ==
The Carolina wolf spider is venomous, but is not meant as a defense system against threats. Instead it is thought that their venom, which is composed of lycotoxins, is used as a paralytic agent for their prey and as a method of defense against infection from any microbes that may be in their prey. Lycotoxins change the ion and voltage gradients in their targets, especially targeting the calcium ion, which is what makes it a paralytic. Recent research on the toxins of the Carolina wolf spider has determined that this particular toxin creates a new subclass of spider venom due to its unique amino-acid-sequencing and the fact that it has important antimicrobial activity.

== Culture ==
H. carolinensis was voted as the state spider of South Carolina in 2000 after an initial suggestion by third grade student Skyler B. Hutto.
