= John R. McCravy =

American historian and politician (1907–1991)

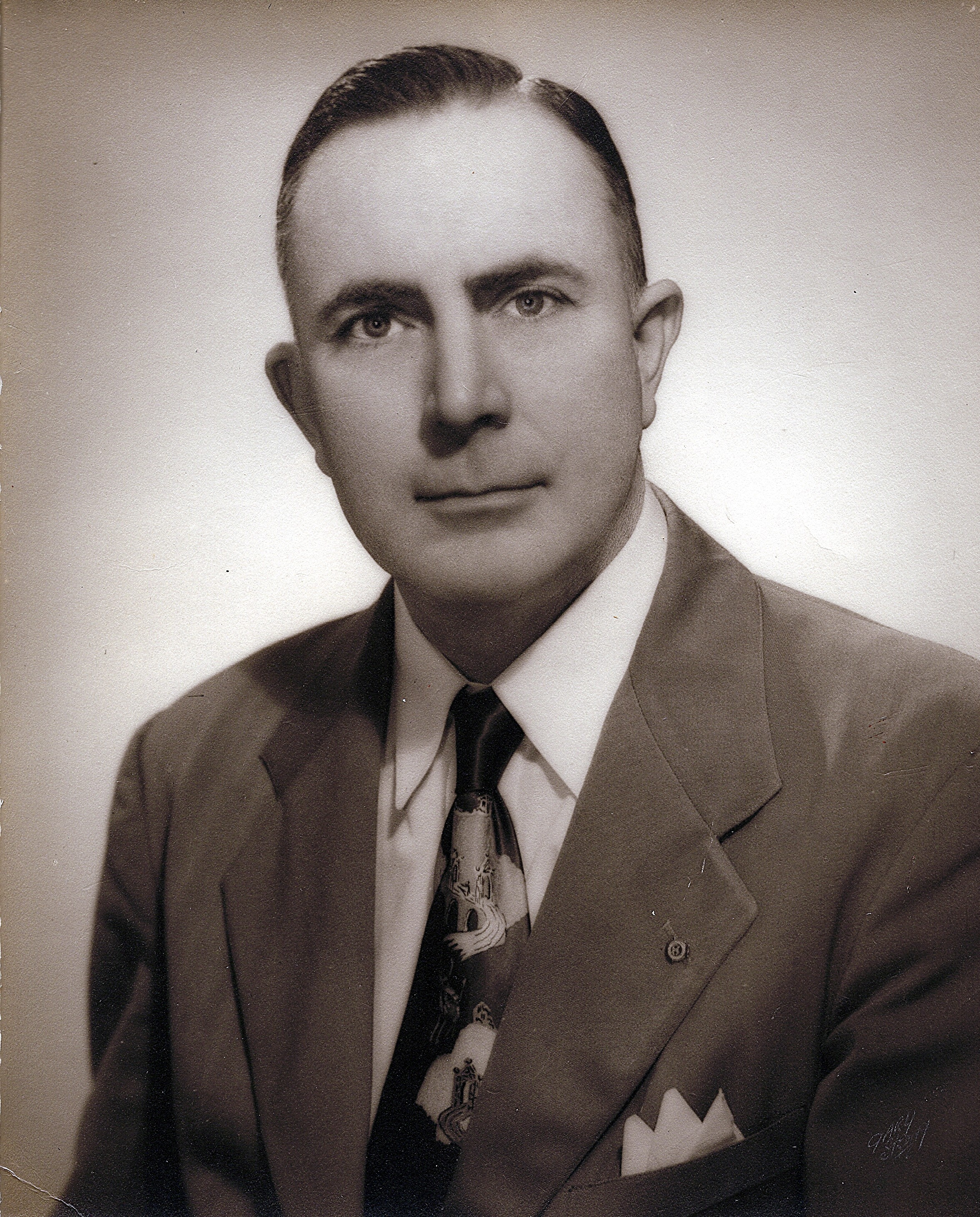

Member of the South Carolina House of Representatives from Pickens County
- In office December 1940 – December 1942 Serving with Thomas B. Nalley
- Preceded by: T. Milton Ponder
- Succeeded by: Ben T. Day

Personal details
- Born: John Robinson McCravy; December 20, 1907 Easley, South Carolina, U.S.
- Died: April 19, 1991 (aged 83) Easley, South Carolina, U.S.
- Party: Democratic
- Spouse: Verna Gravely (m. 1932)
- Parent: E. P. McCravy (father)
- Relatives: John R. McCravy III (grandson)
- Education: Clemson College (BA)

John Robinson McCravy Sr. (December 20, 1907 – April 19, 1991) was a South Carolina state legislator, businessman, law enforcement officer, artist and civic leader. He was the son of Edwin Parker McCravy and Elizabeth Robinson McCravy, the former serving in both the South Carolina House of Representatives and the South Carolina Senate. He married Verna Gravely McCravy of Six Mile on February 5, 1931 with whom he had three sons.

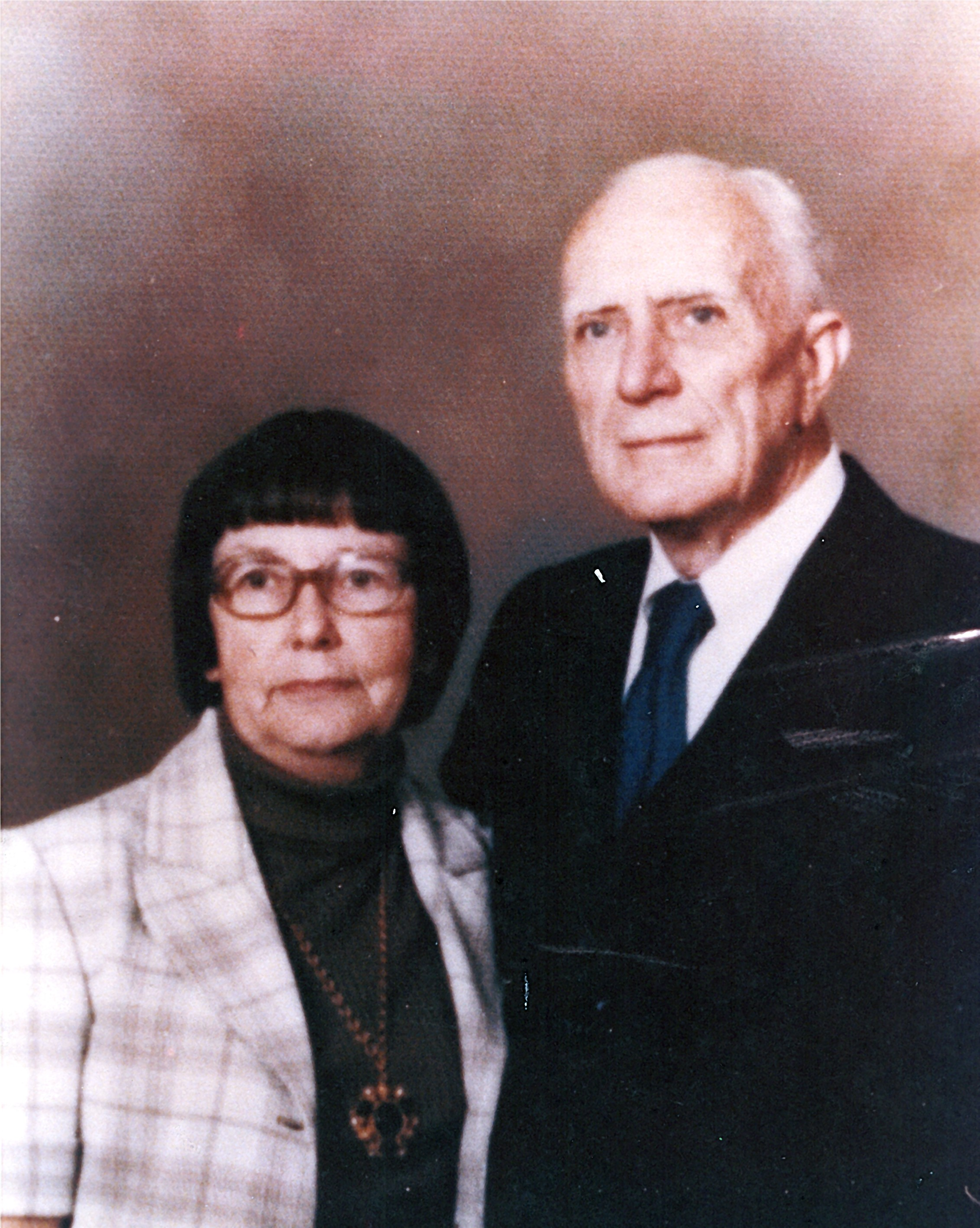
John and Verna were married 60 years.

A graduate of Clemson College, he introduced a bill that led to the funding for construction of the Clemson Football stadium known today as "Death Valley." He organized the Pickens County Historical Society and served as its first President and Museum Curator.

In addition to serving in the South Carolina House of Representatives, he retired as a law enforcement officer with the South Carolina Public Service Commission, a forerunner of the current SC State Transport Police. He served his local community on the Appalachian Council of Government, the Board of Elections and as Executive Secretary of the Easley Chamber of Commerce. He served on the Old Stone Church Commission, was an active Grange member, active in the Shrine, active in Scouting and taught Sunday School at Easley First United Methodist Church. John was a chief organizer of the Pickens Centennial Celebration in 1968.

McCravy's artistic accomplishments include many portraits of prominent South Carolinians, a number of baptismal scenes in upstate SC churches, and a mural in the Bates Masonic Lodge (where he served as Secretary). During the 1920s, he performed the banjo with several bands broadcast over WSB in Atlanta.

In 1974, McCravy was inducted into the Easley Hall of Fame and in 1978 received the Sertoma Service to Mankind Award. For his 30 years of service in Scouting, he received the Silver Beaver award from the Blue Ridge Council and a pavilion is named in his honor at Camp Old Indian, Boy Scouts of America Summer Camp. He was a 32nd degree Mason, Shriner and Chaplain of the Hejaz Band.

McGravy's grandson, John R. McCravy III, is currently a member of the South Carolina House of Representatives.
