= Château des Matignon =

Château in Manche, Normandy, France

Coordinates: 49.0341°N 0.9788°W

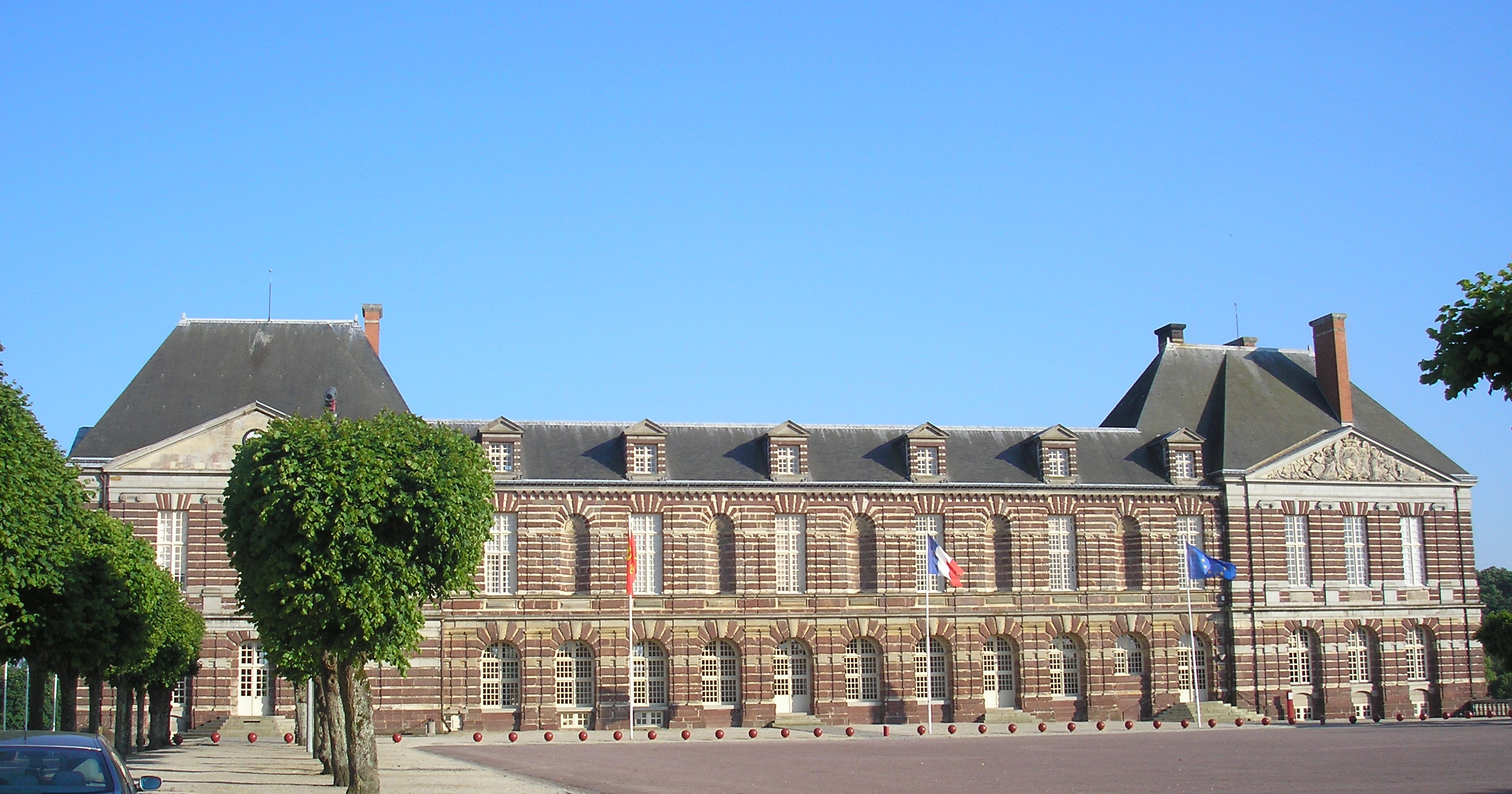
The remaining wing of the Château des Matignon, seen from the north. On the left is the 19th century (east) pavilion, where once was the main wing of the Château

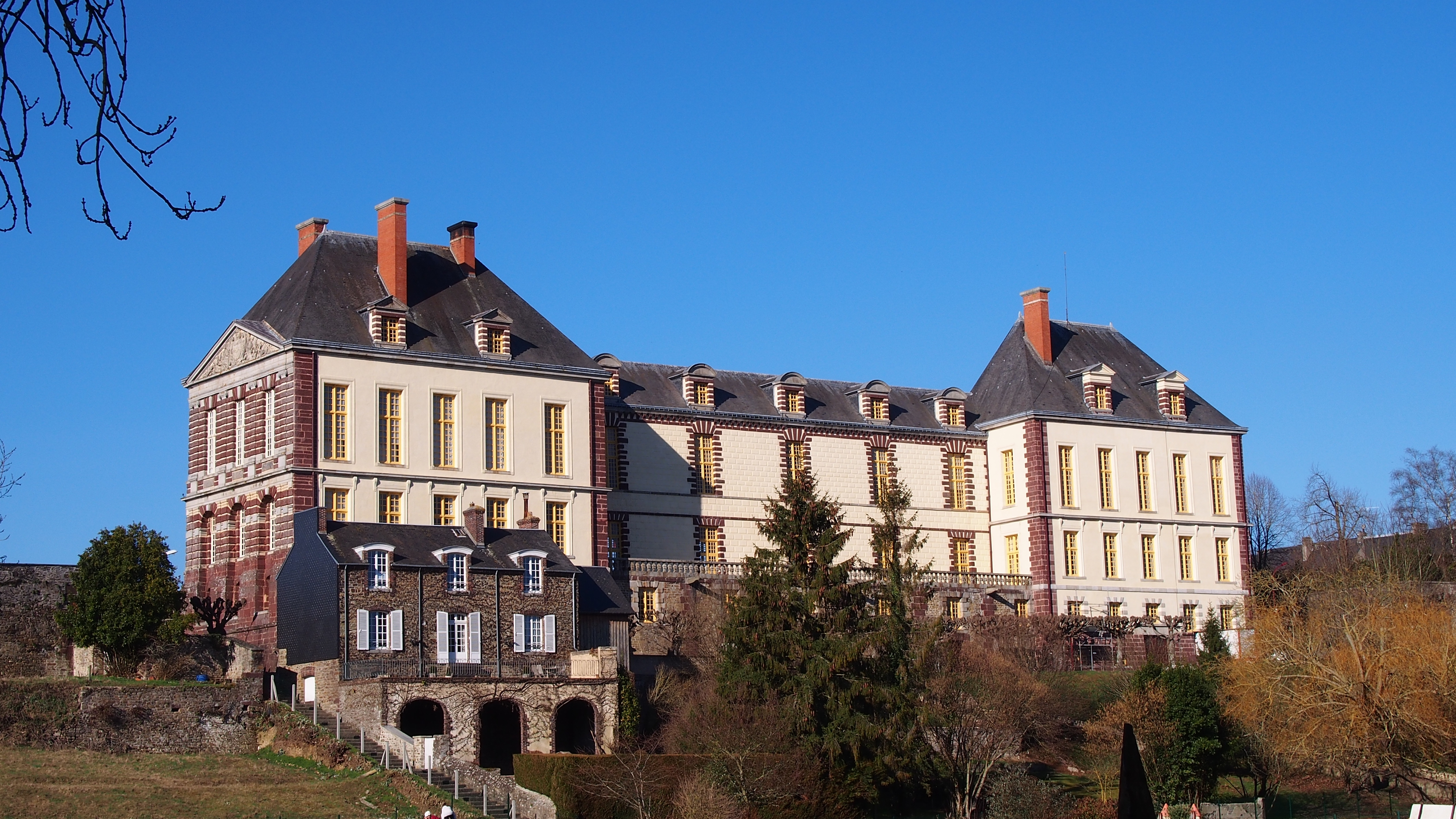
The remaining wing from the south

The Château des Matignon (French pronunciation: [ʃato de matiɲɔ̃]; also named the ‘château de Torigni’) is a former princely residence located in Torigni-sur-Vire in the Manche department, Normandy, northwestern France. The southern wing that you see today is all that remains of the castle from the 16th and 17th centuries. Originally, there were three wings enclosing a main courtyard that opened to the west, but it suffered substantial damage during the French Revolution. The castle's history is closely related to the Matignon family and the princely family of Monaco, the House of Grimaldi. Presently, the château is owned by the local municipality, serving both as its administrative offices and as a museum.

== History ==
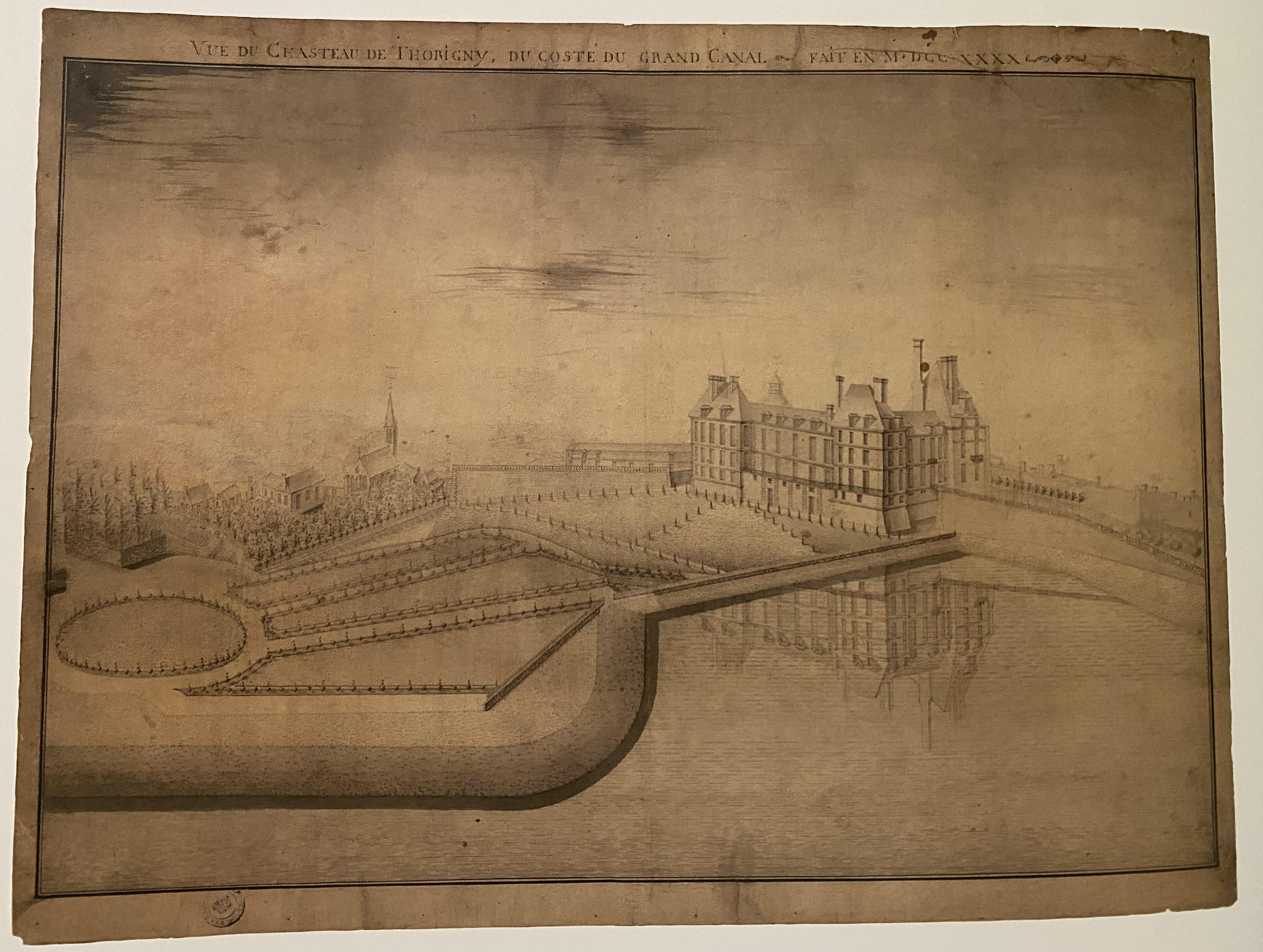
Château des Matignon around 1740

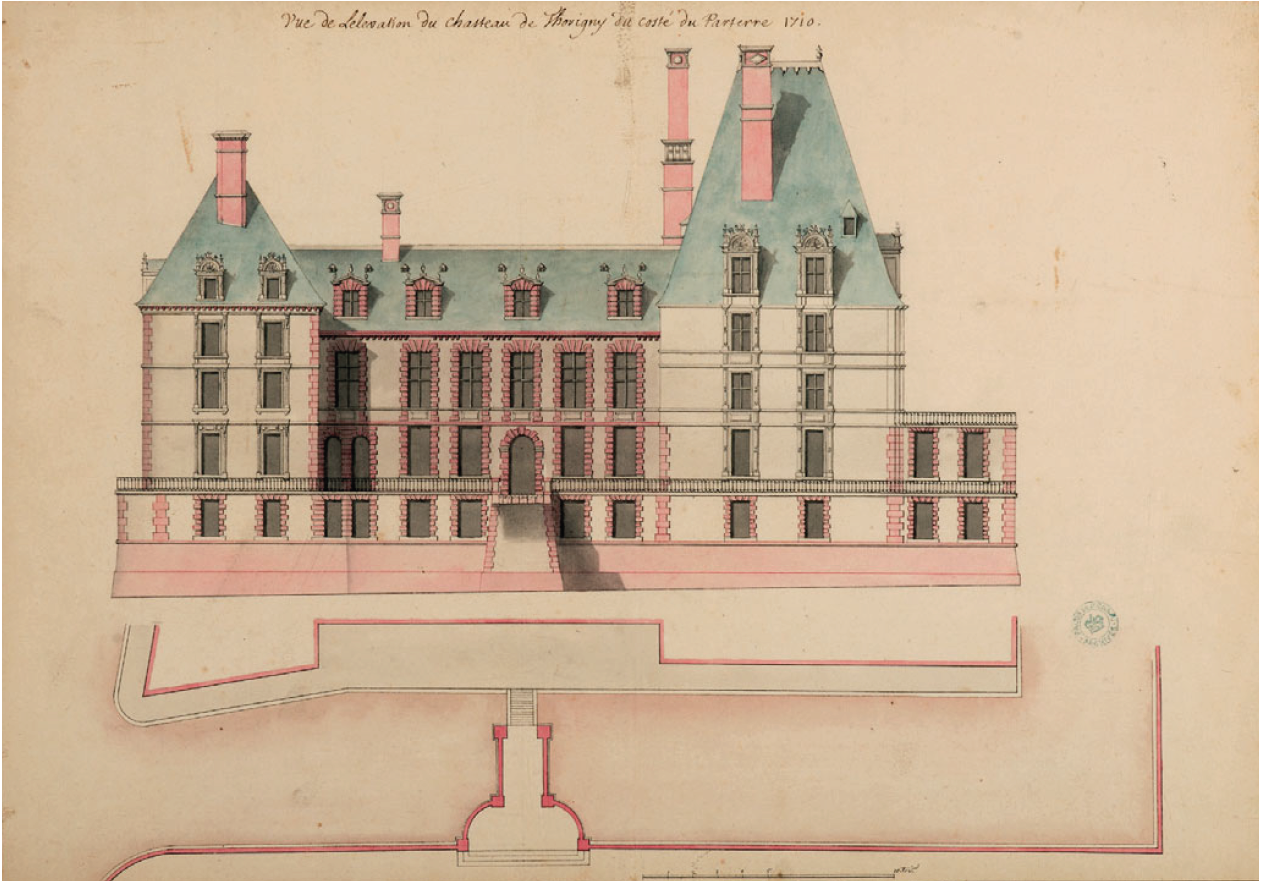
Garden facade in 1710

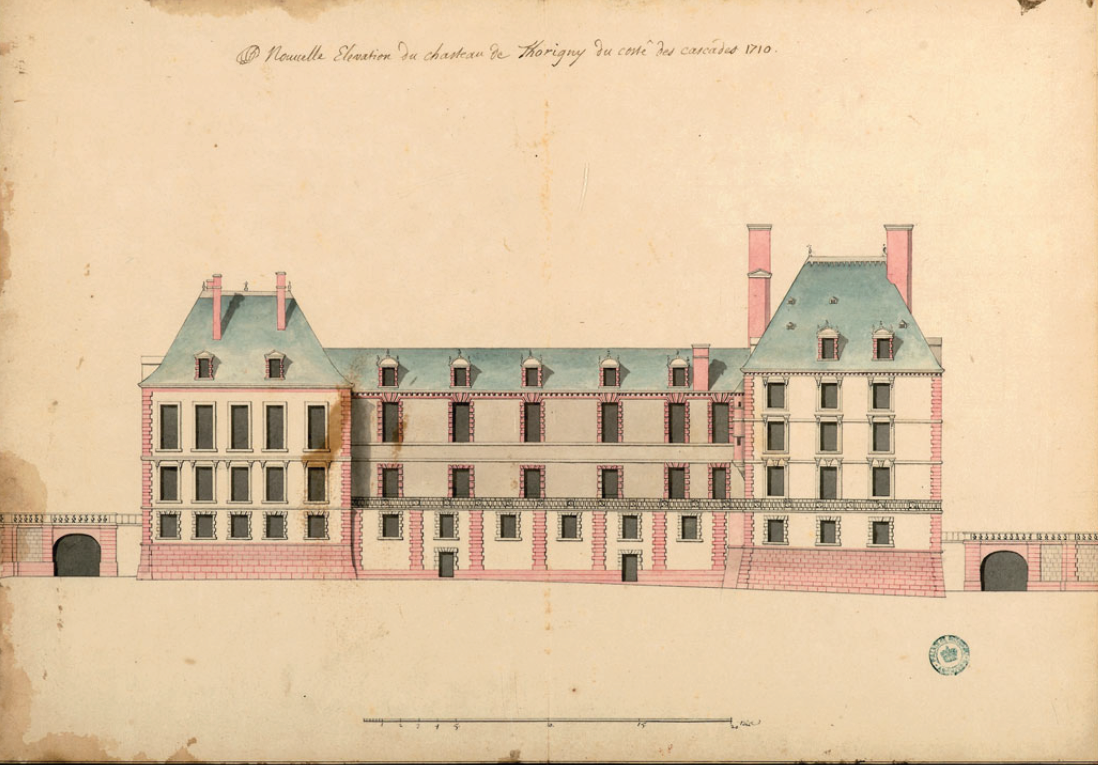
Garden facade in 1710

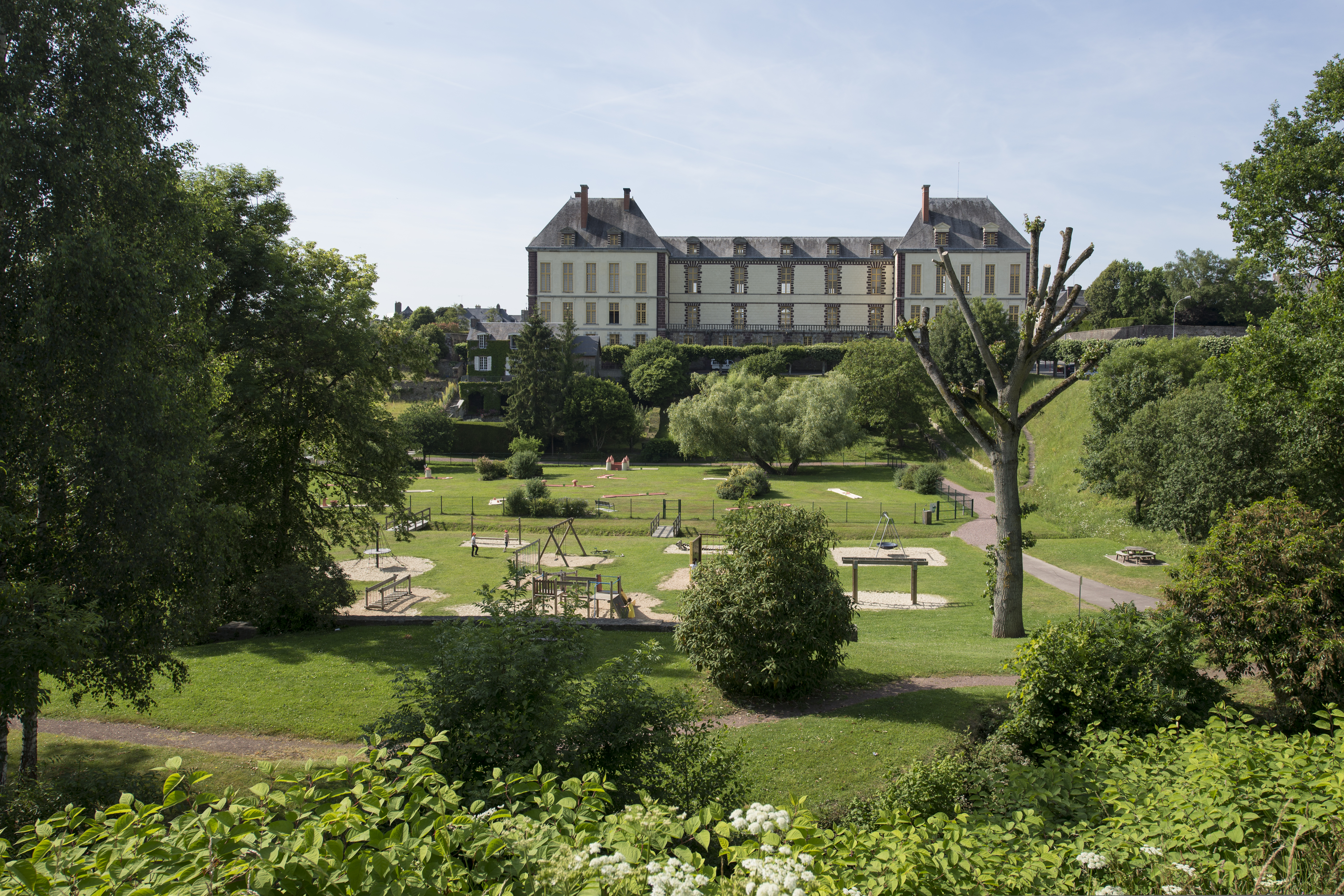
The garden facade today

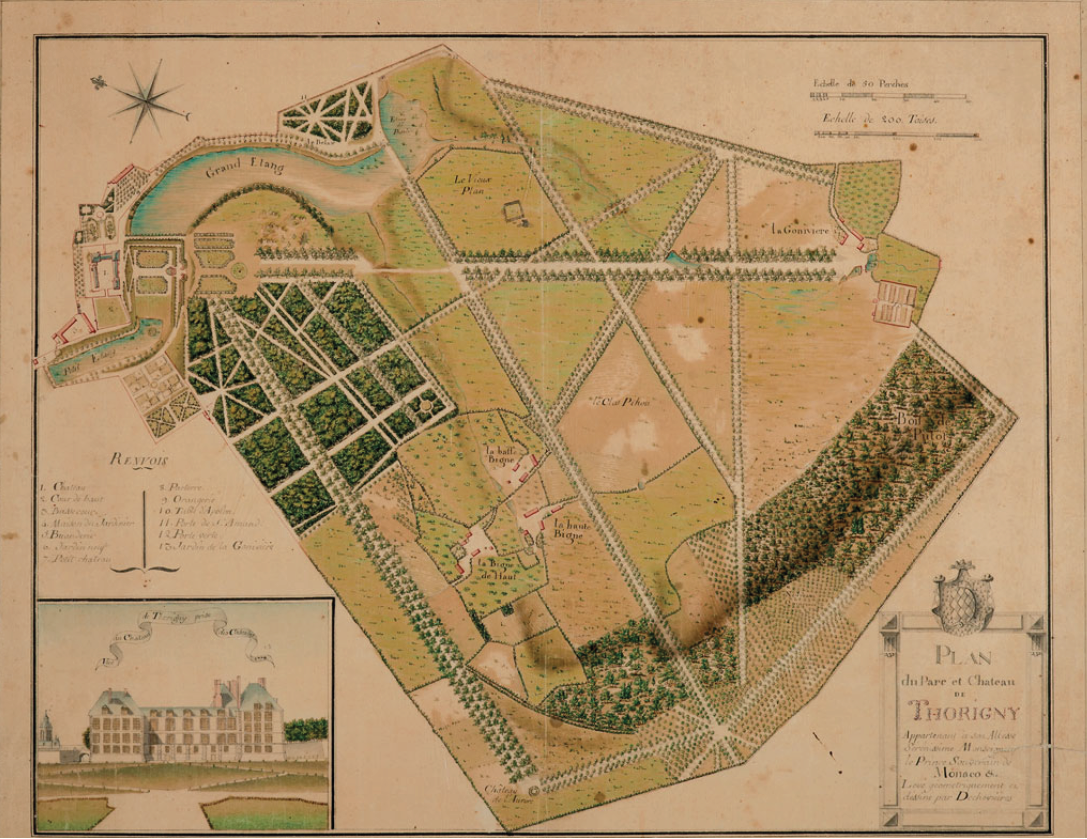
Plan of the Park and Château des Matignon in 1779

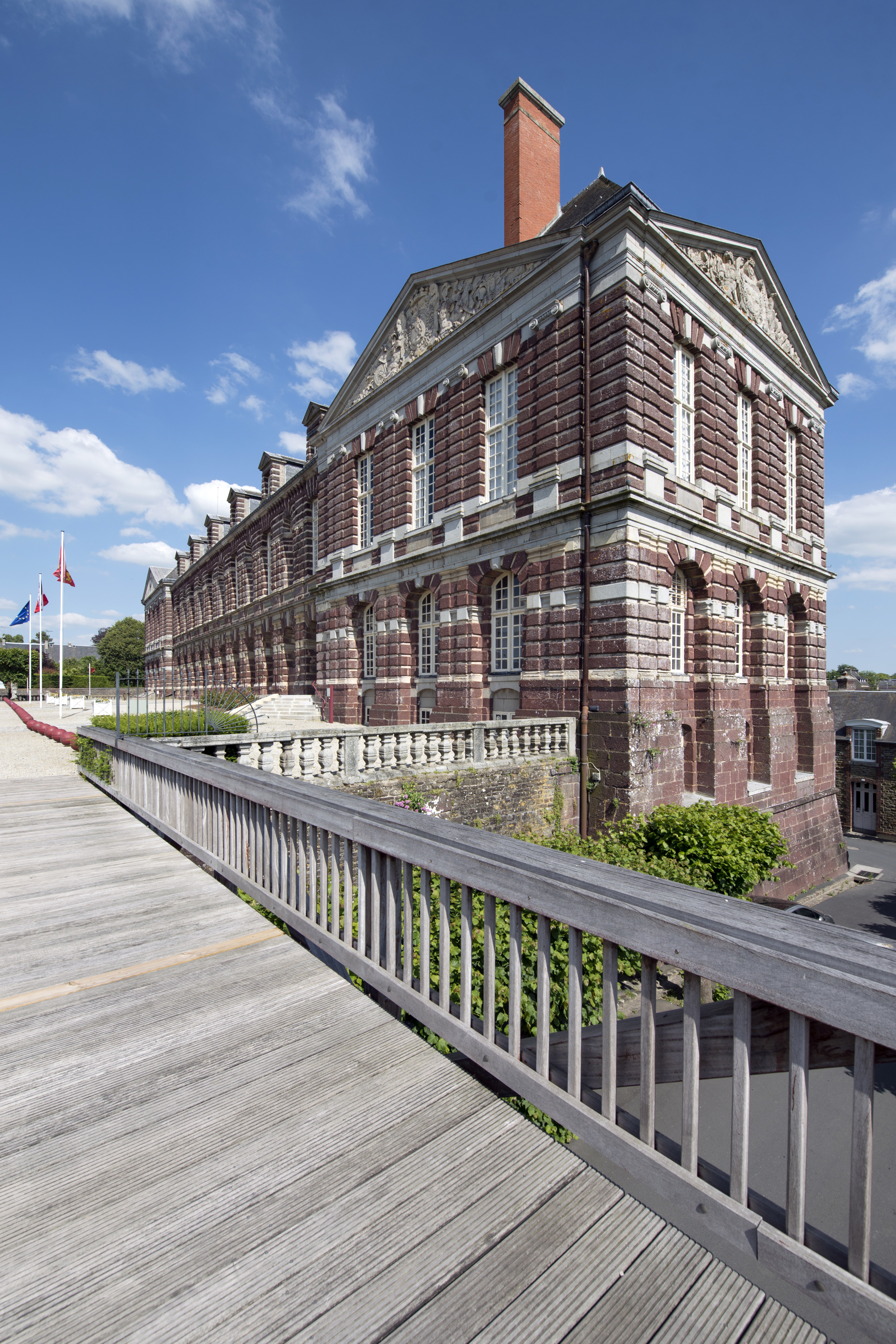
The remaining wing today

=== Middle Ages ===
In the 12th century a castle was erected on the very spot where the present château stands. It belonged to Robert, 1st Earl of Gloucester (1090–1147), an illegitimate son of King Henry I of England and half-brother of the Empress Matilda, who he supported during the civil war known as the Anarchy. Robert gained possession of Torigni castle through his marriage to Mabel FitzRobert, daughter and heir of Robert Fitzhamon. He enhanced the castle's defenses by adding towers and ramparts surrounded by ditches. Moreover, a substantial water barrier surrounded the castle, rendering it nearly impregnable.

On 12 May 1203, the Bretons, allies of the French king Philipp II, ruined the castle during a raid into Normandy. But it is rebuilt afterwards. Also, during the Hundred Years' War, the castle is captured by knights of the English king Edward III.

During the Middle Ages, the ownership of the castle and its surrounding domain passed into the hands of the ‘De Mauny’ family. The last descendant and heiress of this lineage, Marguerite Mauny, married Jean de Goyon de Matignon in 1421. This marks the establishment in Normandy of the Goyon de Matignon family, who were originally from Brittany . The castle itself is then made up of three wings surrounding a courtyard. Jean's son, Bertrand IV, had his services for France rewarded with an elevation of Thorigny to a barony. Later in the 16th century, Thorigny becomes a county.

=== 16th and 17th centuries ===
Jacques I de Goyon de Matignon and his son Jacques II (1525–1598) transform the medieval castle into a Renaissance-style residence. Significant portions of the medieval fortifications are dismantled to accommodate the construction of the new castle. They create over time two pavilions which are connected by a long gallery, based on plan by master mason François Gabriel. Charles, the son of Jacques II, adds a third pavilion and second wing at the start of the 17th century. Around 1630, the château reaches its completion.

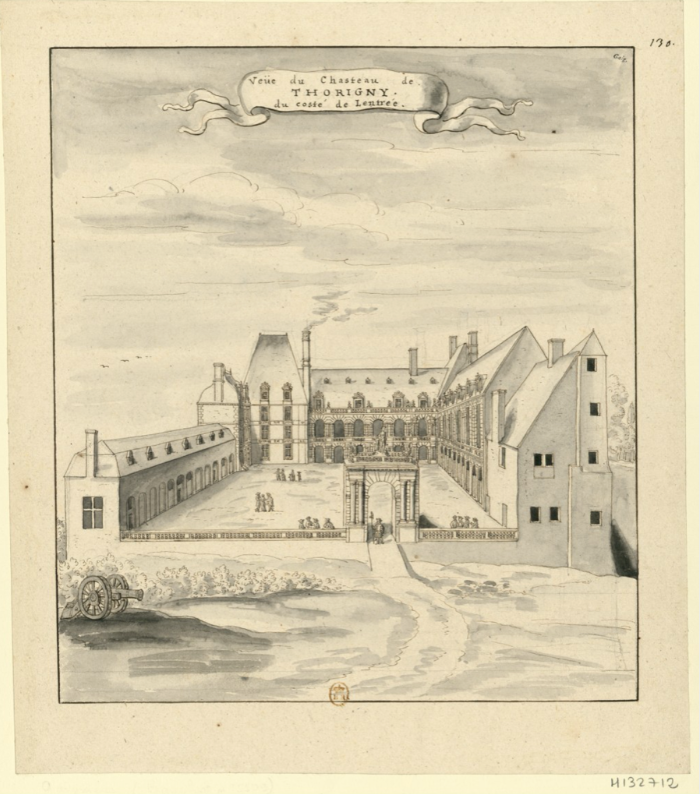
View of the renaissance castle

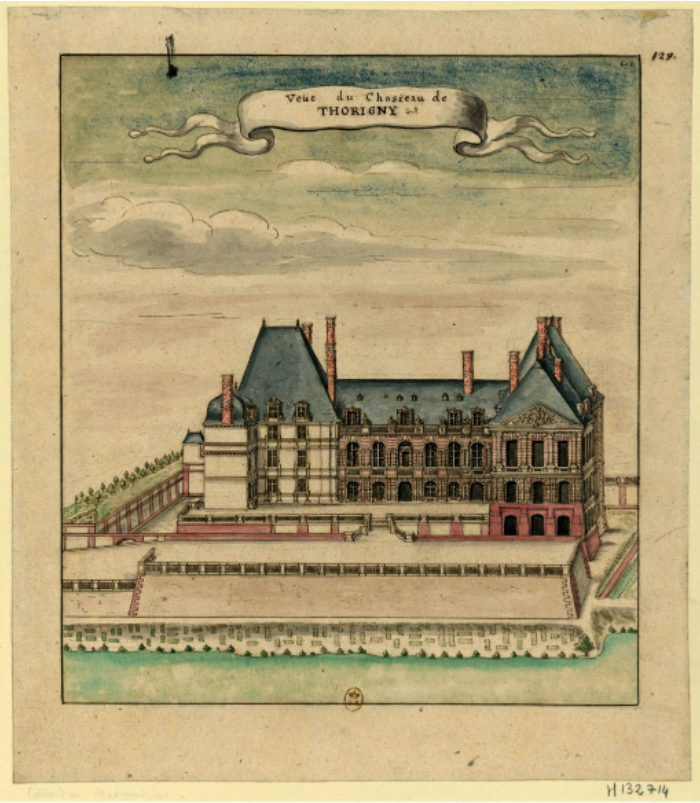
View of the renaissance castle

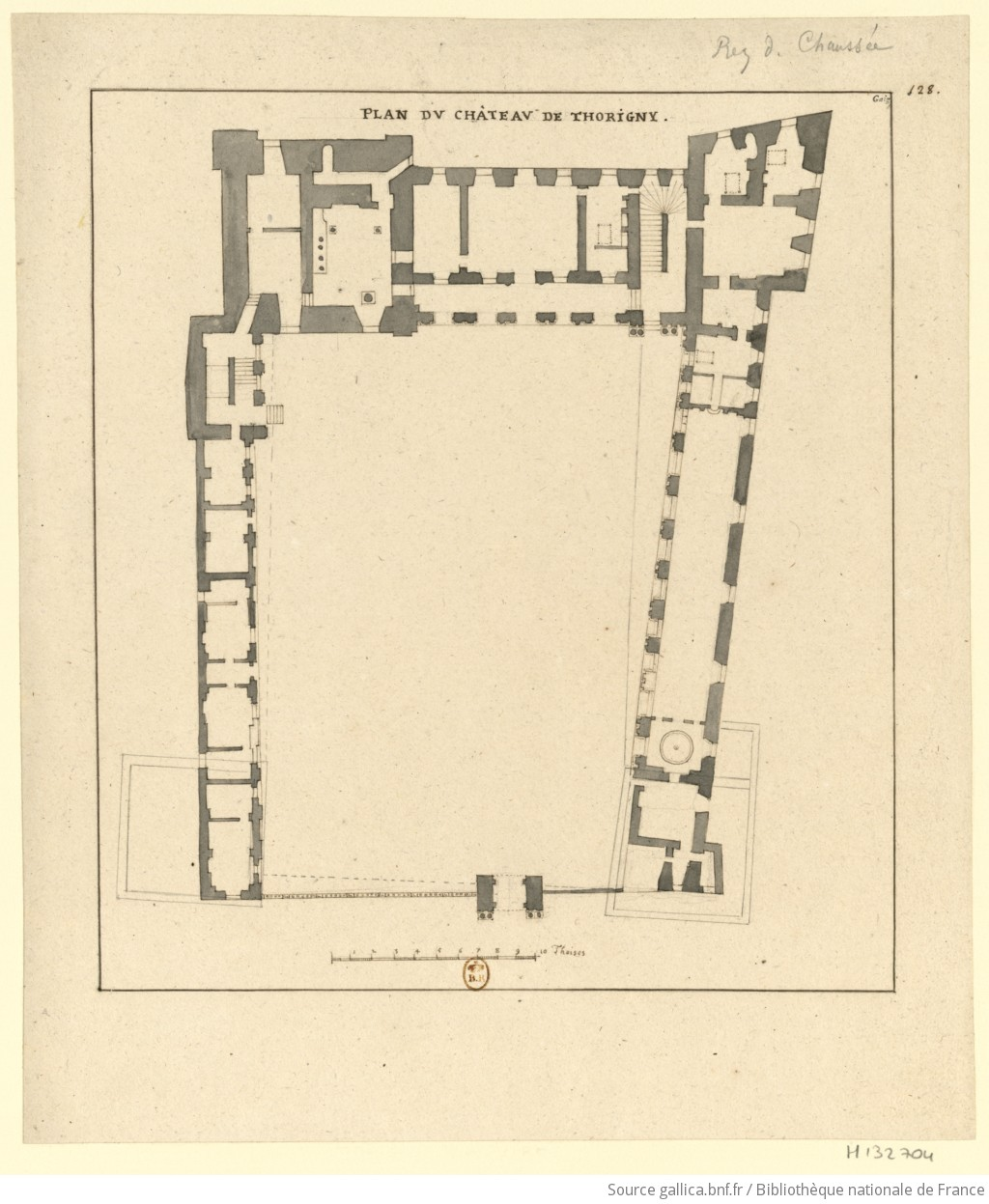
Ground floor of the renaissance castle

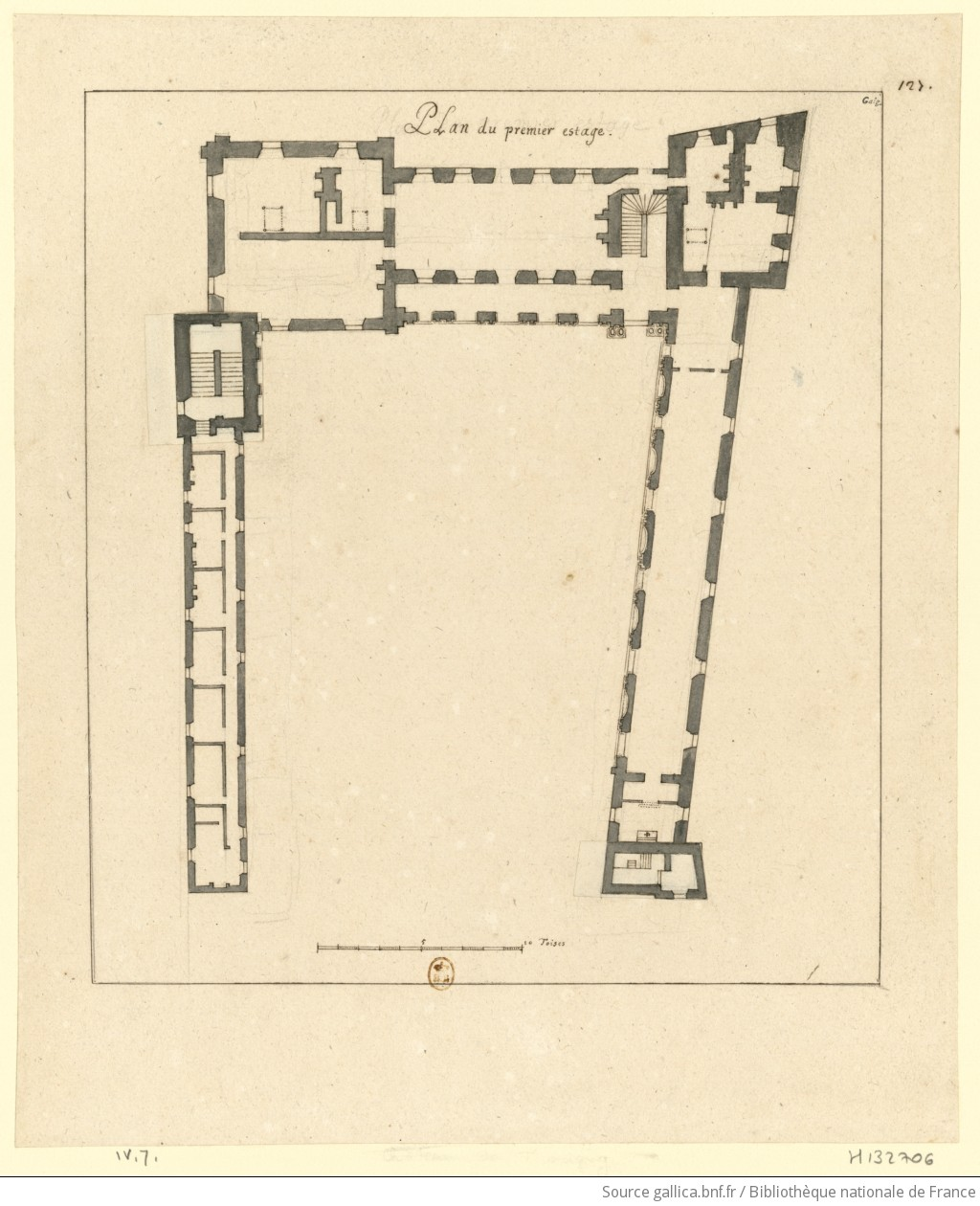
First floor of the renaissance castle

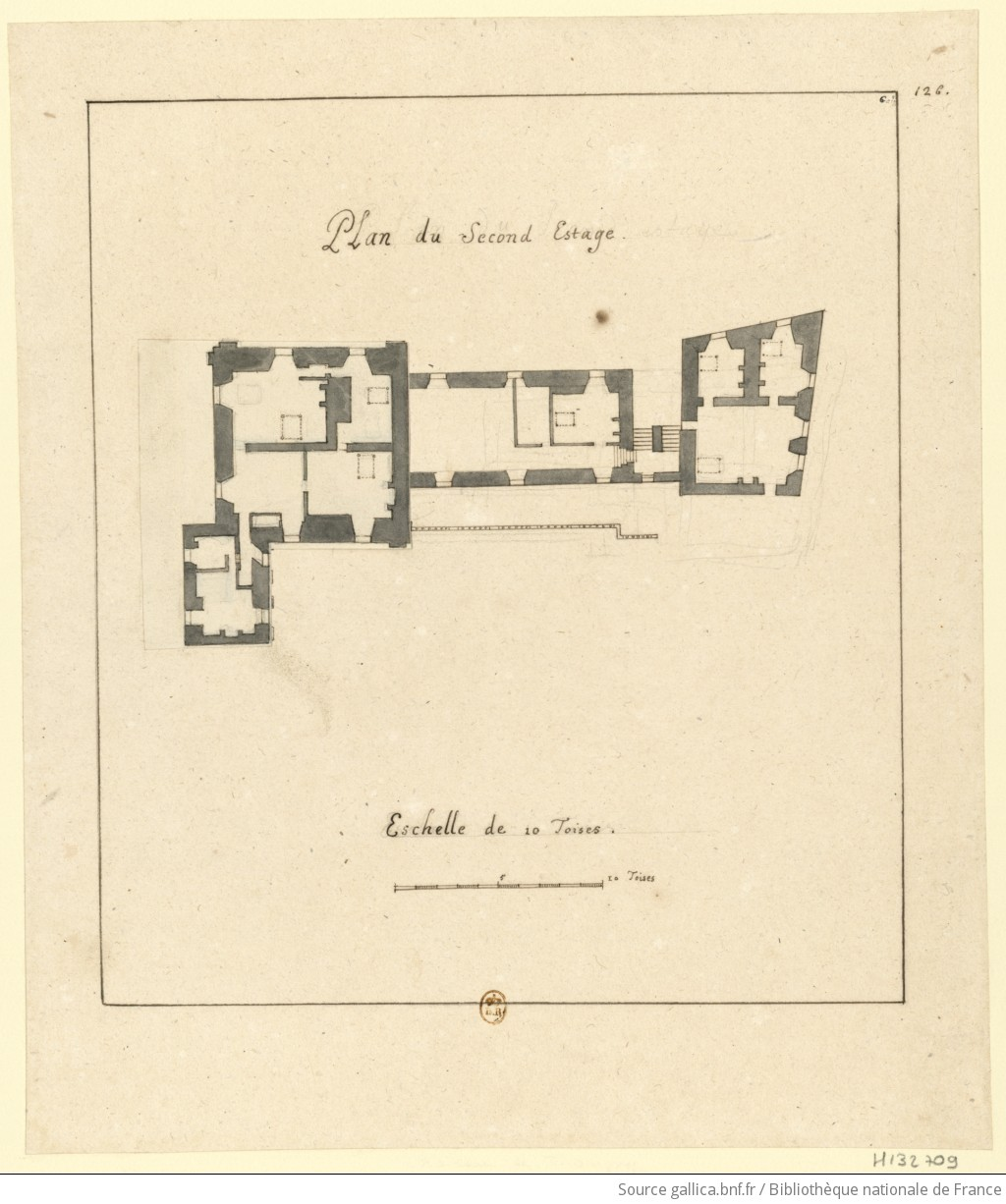
Second floor of the renaissance castle

=== 18th century ===
At the start of the 18th century, Jacques III (1644-1725) further embellished the château: a large park was created including a magnificent cascade. His son, Jacques IV (1689–1751) makes the connection to Monaco, as he marries Louise Hippolyte, Princess of Monaco (1697–1731), the heiress to the throne of Monaco. In 1731, Jacques IV became Jacques I, prince of Monaco, establishing a lasting connection between the Matignon and Grimaldi families. The Prince of Monaco still bears the title ‘baron of Thorigny’.

Both prince Jacques I and his son prince Honoré III (1720–1795) did not spend much time in Monaco. Their primary residences were the Hôtel Matignon in Paris (the current official residence of the Prime Minister of France) and the Château des Matignon as the summer residence. Antoine Grimaldi, le Chevalier de Grimaldi, (1697–1784) acted as a regent in Monaco for the absent prince between 1732 and 1784.

=== French Revolution and Napoleonic times ===
In December 1793, during the French Revolution, the property of the Grimaldi family of Monaco was confiscated, and the castle was transformed into a prison, a dark period that lasted until January 1795.

In March 1805, the castle was put up for auction and acquired by General Santerre (1752–1809). However, his attempts to secure the necessary funds fell short, leaving the iconic residence once again on the market. Ultimately, it was bought by a real estate agent for the sum of 1.6 million pounds. With the winning bid secured, a wave of radical changes swept through the property. Two wings of the château were demolished. Forests were cleared, the greenhouse was dismantled, and the cascades were obliterated, signalling the end of a lavish era.

=== 19th century ===
In 1817, under leadership of the mayor at the time, Mr. Chartier de la Varignière, a pivotal decision is made: He convinced the municipal council to purchase the only remaining wing of the castle with the intention of converting it into a town hall.

Around 1840, the municipality erected the east pavilion aiming to reinstate the architectural equilibrium disrupted by previous demolitions. Today, this pavilion plays a crucial role in safeguarding the harmony and heritage of this remarkable structure.

=== 20th century ===
On 12 June 1944, after the town centre of Torigni was bombarded, only four walls of the château remained. The efforts of successive town councils to restore the castle, while not returning it to its original splendour, have ensured that it remains an impressive historic monument.

Since then, the efforts of various municipalities have been focused on the restoration of the castle. In 2004, the castle's clock, stopped at the time of the 1944 bombing, was restored to commemorate the 60th anniversary of the D-Day landings. Today, the castle houses municipal offices and exhibition rooms.

== See also ==
- Château de Marchais
- Hotel Matignon
- Palazzo Spinola di Pellicceria
- Prince's Palace of Monaco

== Literature ==
- Guillot, Gaétan (1899). "Le château de Torigny". La Normandie monumentale et pittoresque, édifices publics, églises, châteaux, manoirs, etc. Manche. 1re partie (in French). Le Havre: Lemale & Cie imprimeurs éditeurs. pp. 81–92.
- Erlande-Brandenburg, Alain (1966). "Le château de Thorigny". Congrès archéologique de France. 124e session. Cotentin et Avranchin. 1966 (in French). Paris: Société française d'archéologie. pp. 316–327.
- Hébert, Michel; Gervaise, André (2003). Châteaux et manoirs de la Manche (in French). Condé-sur-Noireau: Éditions Charles Corlet. pp. 169–172. ISBN 978-2847061437.
- La Normandie des princes de Monaco, du maréchal de Matignon au prince Albert II (in French). Saint-Lô: Musée des beaux-arts de Saint-Lô. 2011. p. 52. ISBN 978-2953595314.
- Faisant, Étienne (2017). "Un château princier en Normandie – Torigni, de Robert de Gloucester aux Grimaldi". Revue d'histoire de Monaco (in French).
- Les princes de monaco en normandie (in French). Point de Vues. 2019. p. 267. ISBN 978-2371950368.
