= E. P. McCravy =

American politician (1873–1942)

Member of the South Carolina Senate from Pickens County
- In office 1921–1922
- Preceded by: Frank E. Alexander
- Succeeded by: John E. Craig

Member of the South Carolina House of Representatives from Pickens County
- In office 1910–1914
- Preceded by: James P. Carey
- Succeeded by: James P. Carey Jr.

Personal details
- Born: Edwin Parker McCravy; October 6, 1873 Abbeville, South Carolina, United States
- Died: January 27, 1942 (aged 68) Greenville, South Carolina, United States
- Political party: Democratic
- Spouse: Elizabeth Robinson (m. 1907)
- Children: 2, including John
- Occupation: Businessman; farmer; politician

Edwin Parker McCravy (October 6, 1873 – January 27, 1942) was an American businessman and politician, who served in both houses of the South Carolina General Assembly.
