= John R. McCravy III =

American politician (born 1958)

Member of the South Carolina House of Representatives from the 13th district
- Incumbent
- Assumed office November 14, 2016
- Preceded by: Robert Shannon Riley

Personal details
- Born: John Robinson McCravy III; September 6, 1958 (age 67)
- Party: Republican
- Relatives: John R. McCravy (grandfather)
- Education: Clemson University (BA); University of South Carolina School of Law (JD)
- Occupation: Lawyer; professor; politician

John Robinson McCravy III (born September 6, 1958) is an American attorney and politician. He is a member of the South Carolina House of Representatives from the 13th District, serving since 2016. He is a member of the Republican party and chairman of the Family Caucus within the South Carolina House. In addition to serving in the State House, McCravy is an attorney and teaches law at Lander University. He is the primary sponsor and architect of South Carolina's fetal heartbeat bills.

In May 2025, more than two dozen members of the South Carolina house resigned from the Family Cause due to McCravy's relationship with out-of-state anti-abortion groups that openly criticized members of the Family Caucus.

He is the grandson of state legislator John R. McCravy and great-grandson of state legislator Edwin Parker McCravy.

== Electoral history ==
=== 2012 SC House of Representatives ===
McCravy's first run for office was for the seat of outgoing incumbent Lewis Pinson in 2012. He was defeated in the Republican primary.

South Carolina House of Representatives District 13 Republican Primary, 2012
Party	Candidate	Votes	%
Republican	Robert Shannon Riley	3,095	57.2
Republican	John R. McCravy III	2,318	42.8
Total votes		5,413	100.0

=== 2016 SC House of Representatives ===
McCravy was the only Republican to run in 2016, so there was no Republican primary. He defeated Democrat Michael Gaskin in the general election.

South Carolina House of Representatives District 13 General Election, 2016
Party	Candidate	Votes	%
Republican	John R. McCravy III	12,498	72.5
Democratic	Michael Gaskin	4,753	27.5
Total votes		17,251	100.0
Republican hold			

=== 2018 SC House of Representatives ===
McCravy was the only Republican to run in 2018, so there was no Republican primary. The 2018 general election was a rematch from 2016; McCravy defeated Gaskin by a similar margin.

South Carolina House of Representatives District 13 General Election, 2018
Party	Candidate	Votes	%
Republican	John R. McCravy III	10,353	71.6
Democratic	Michael Gaskin	4,109	28.4
Write-in		7	0.0
Total votes		14,469	100.0
Republican hold			
