= Floyd Nicholson =

American politician

Member of the South Carolina Senate from the 10th district
- In office 2009 – January 12, 2021
- Preceded by: John W. Drummond
- Succeeded by: Billy Garrett

Personal details
- Born: July 26, 1949 (age 77) Greenwood, South Carolina, U.S.
- Party: Democratic
- Spouse: Mamie
- Children: 3
- Education: South Carolina State University
- Profession: Educator, politician

Floyd Nicholson (born July 26, 1949) is a former Democratic member of the South Carolina Senate, representing the 10th District from 2009 to 2021. He is a retired teacher and former mayor and city council member of Greenwood, South Carolina, where he resides.

== Awards and honors ==
In March 2023, Nicholson was awarded the Order of the Palmetto, the State of South Carolina's highest honor. The award was presented by State Senator Micheal Gambrell and former State Representative J. Anne Parks.

South Carolina Senate
Preceded by John W. Drummond	Member of the South Carolina Senate from the 10th district 2009–2020	Succeeded by Billy Garrett
