= List of Donald Trump 2024 presidential campaign current officials endorsements =

A range of notable current officials endorsed Donald Trump for the 2024 U.S. presidential election.

== U.S. senators ==
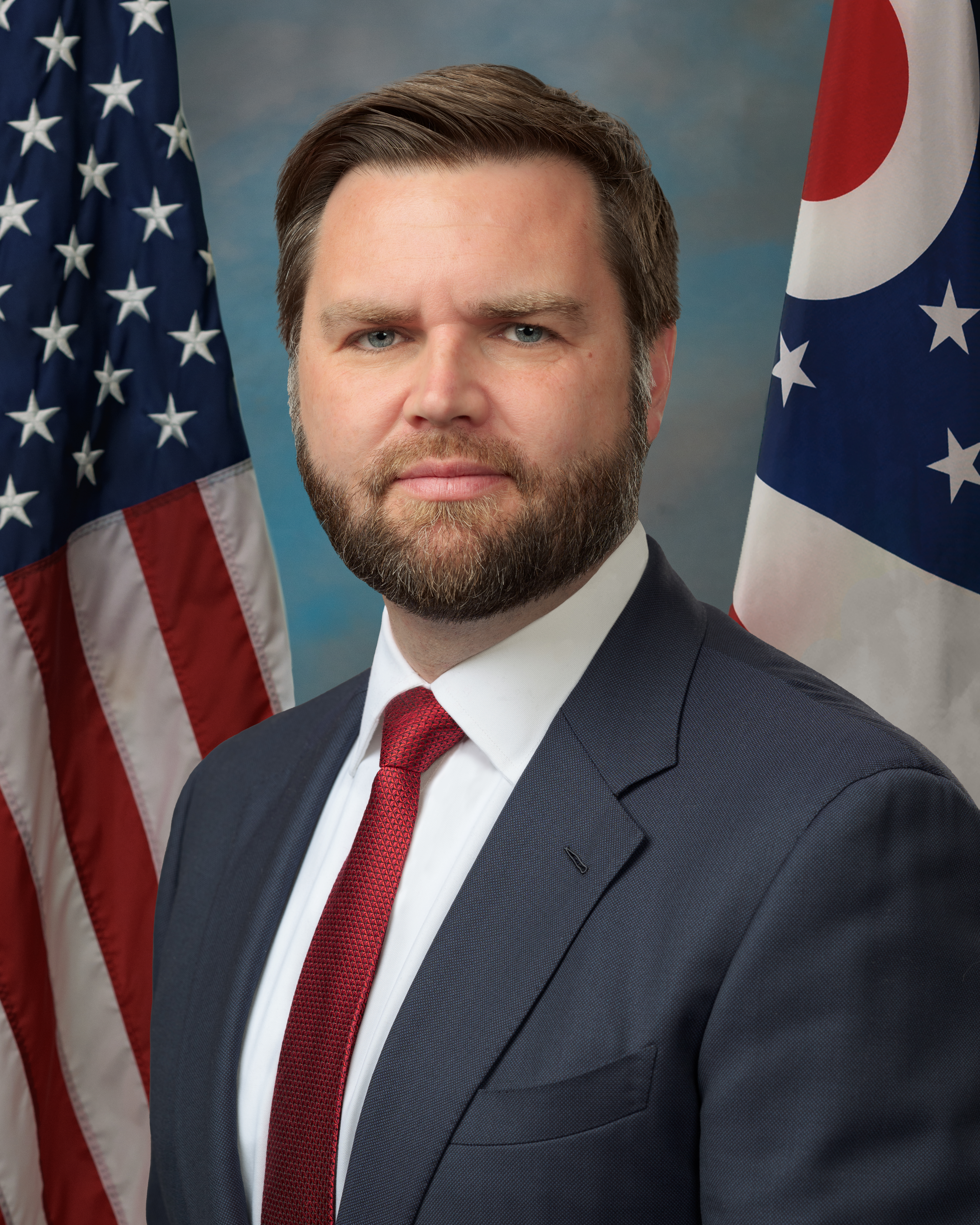
JD Vance

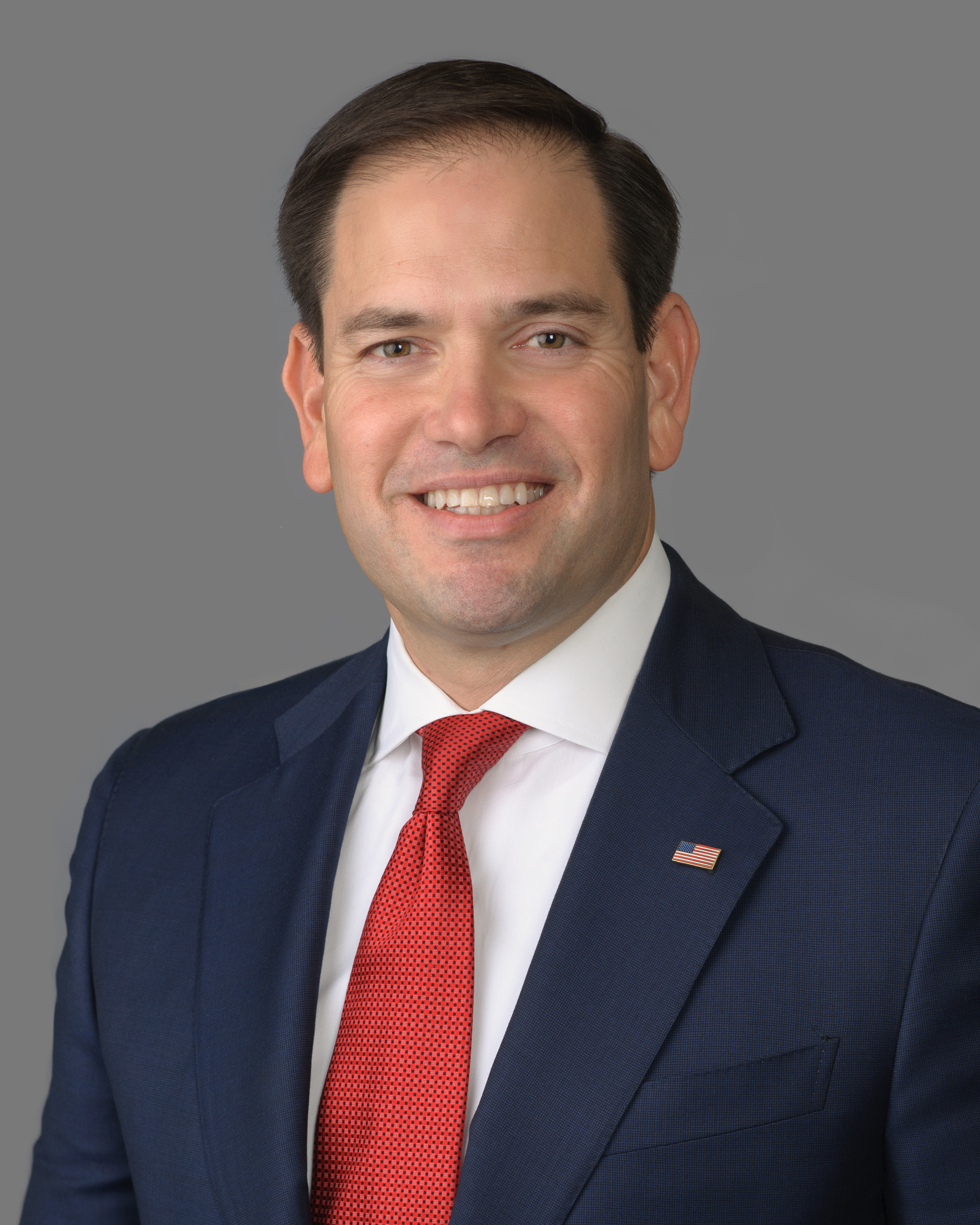
Marco Rubio

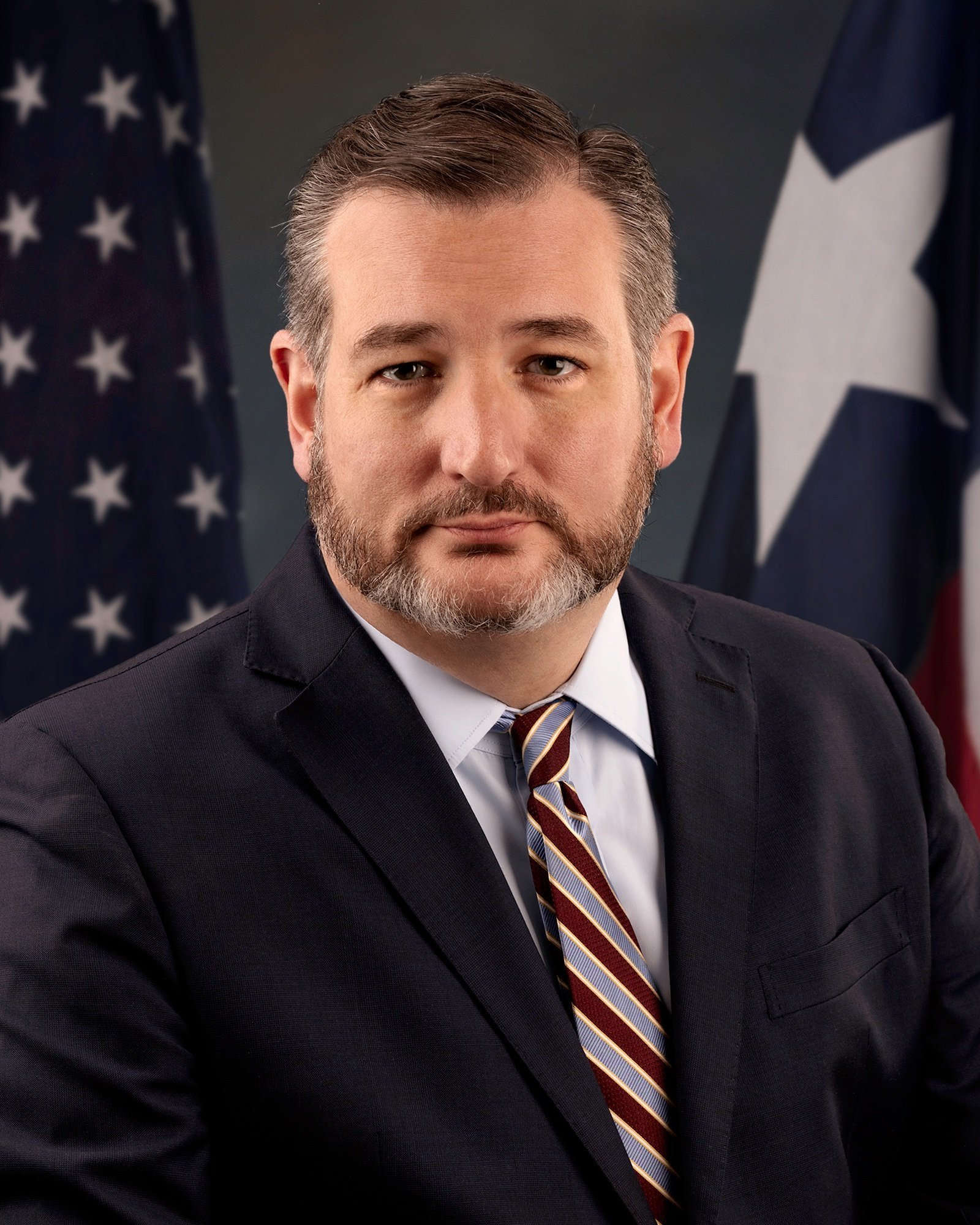
Ted Cruz

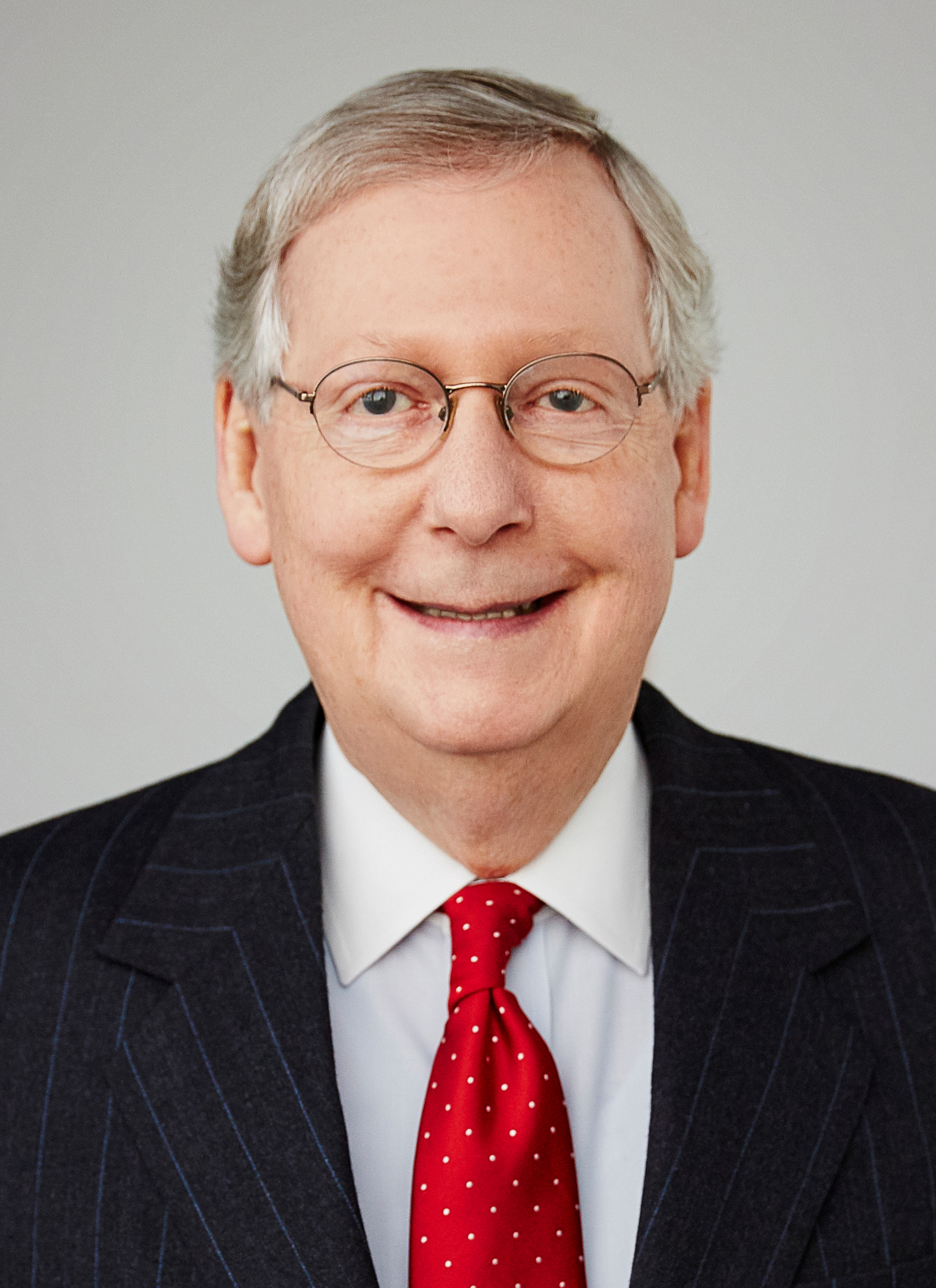
Mitch McConnell

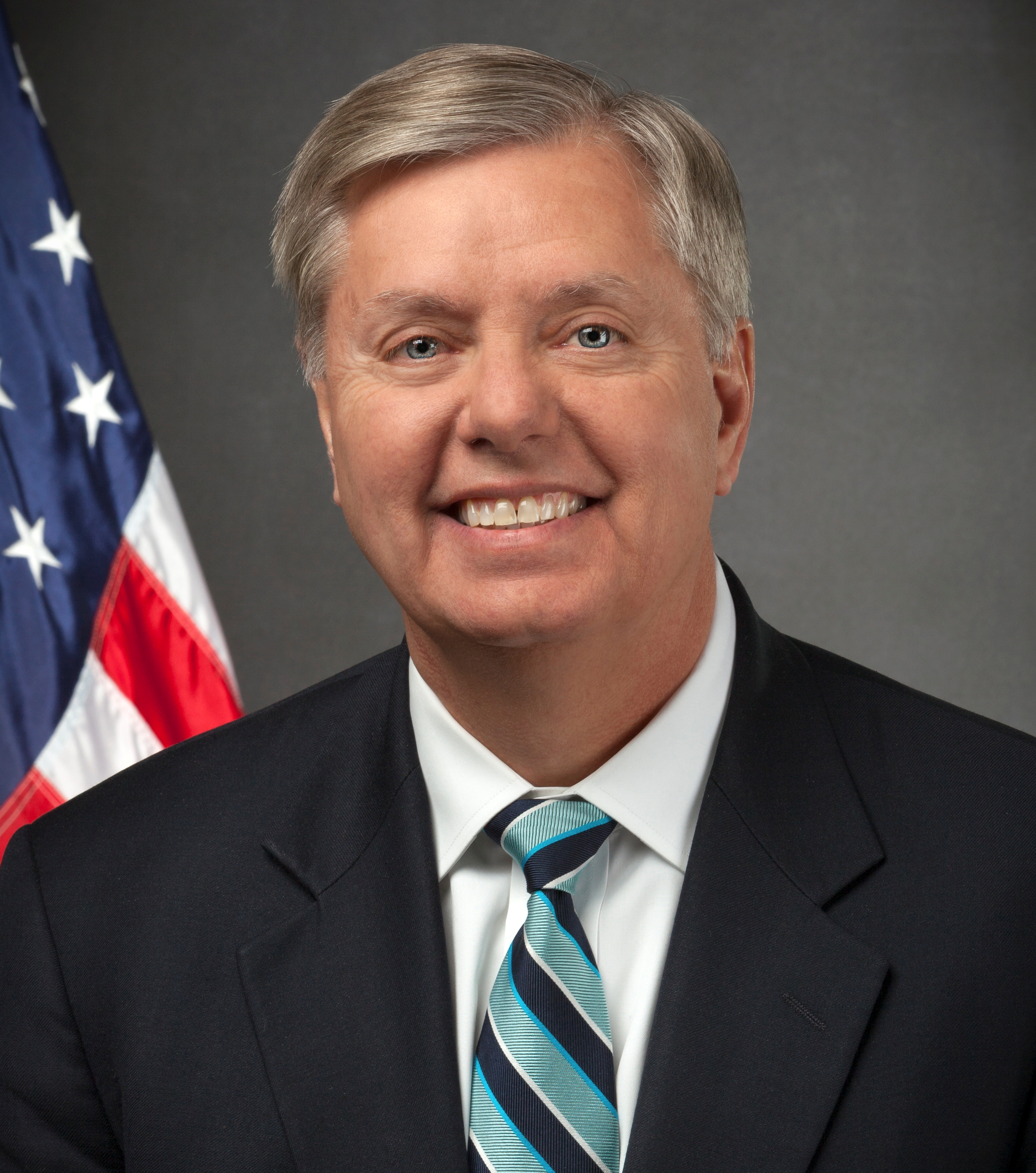
Lindsey Graham

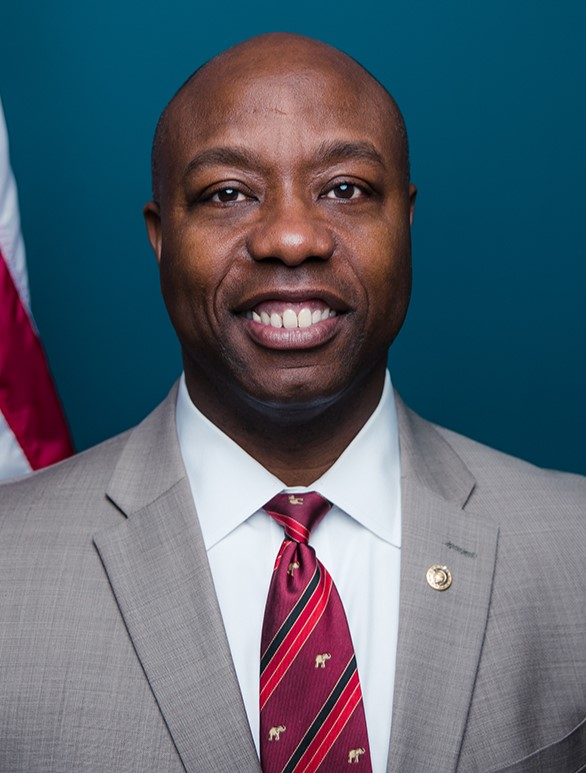
Tim Scott

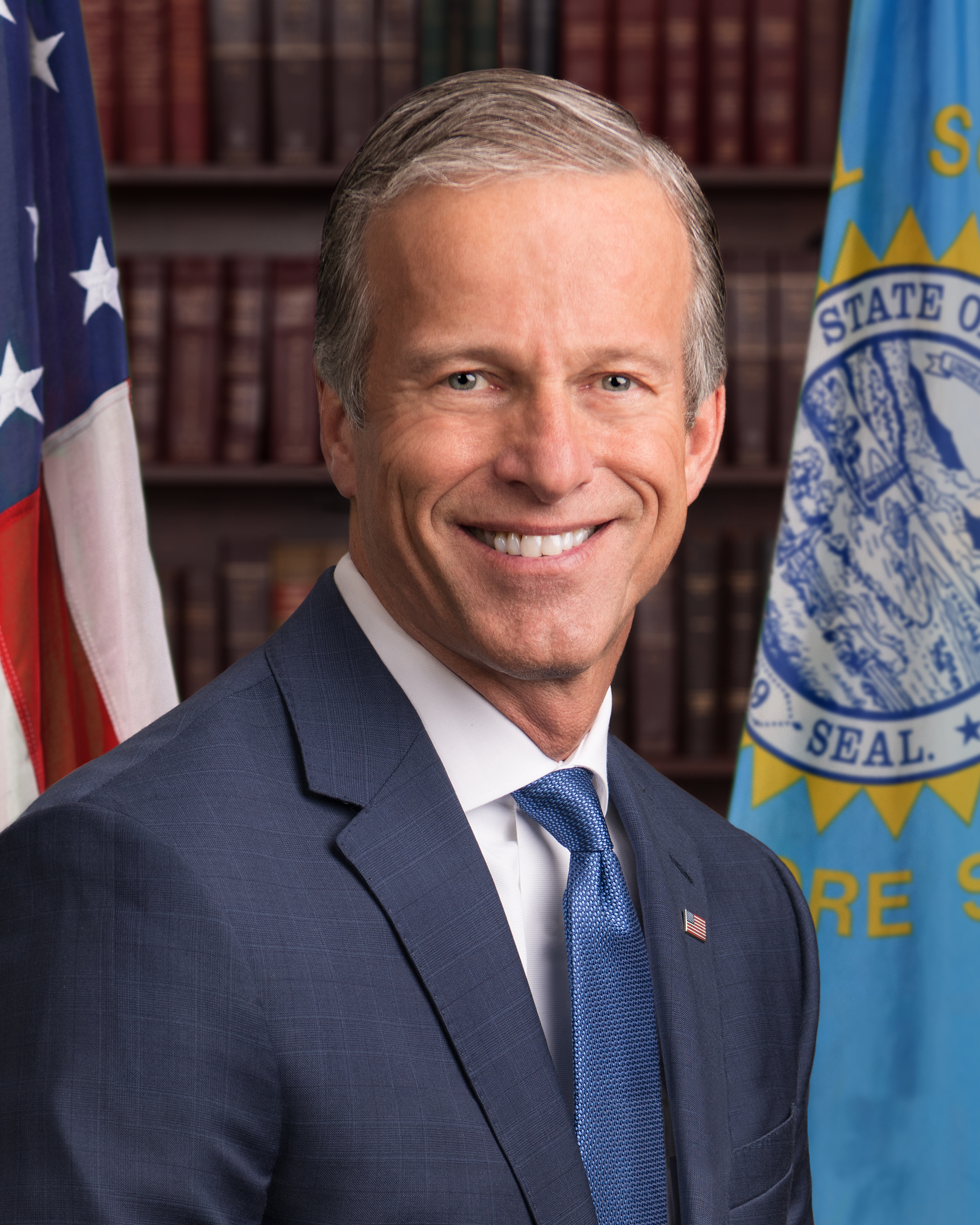
John Thune

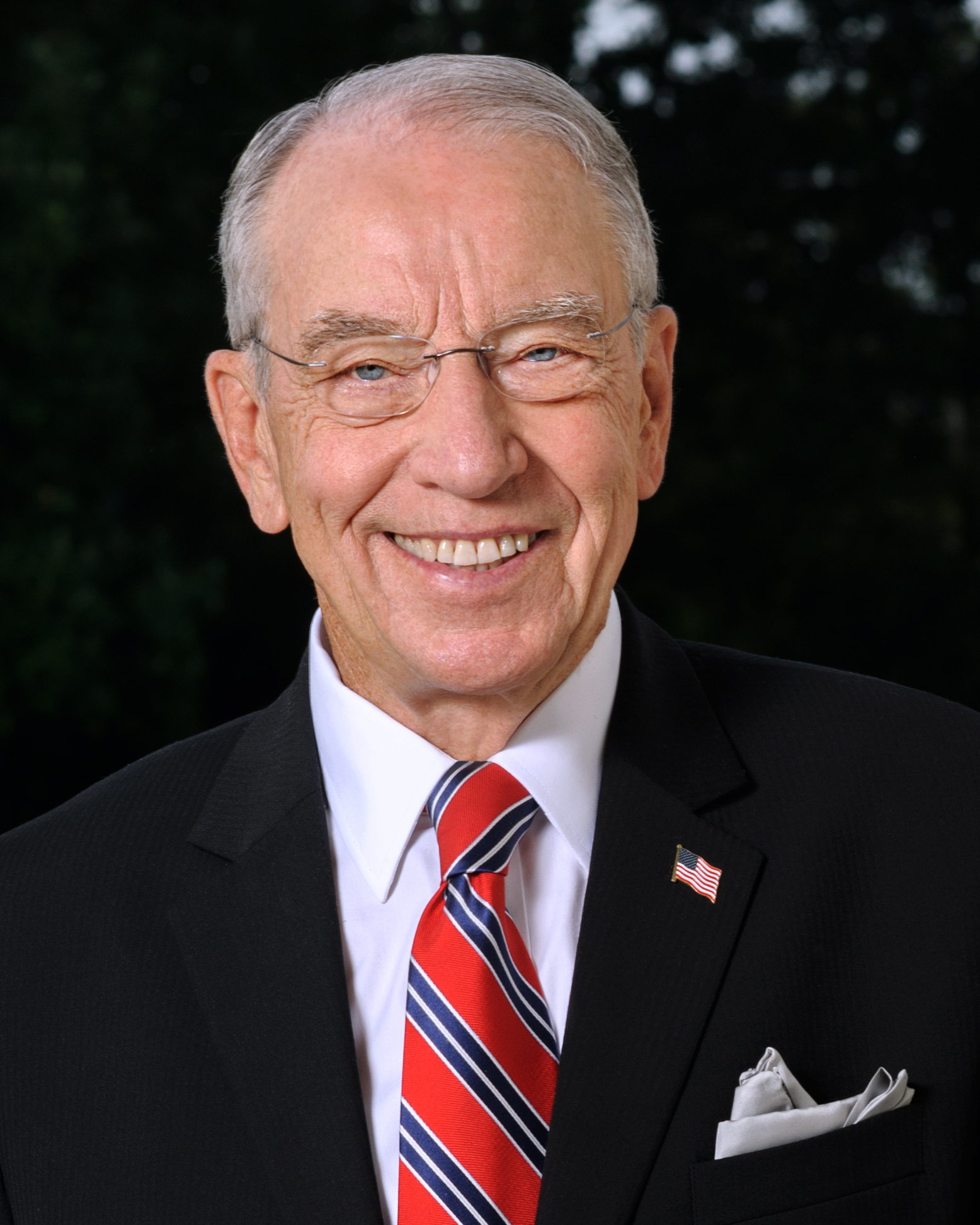
Chuck Grassley

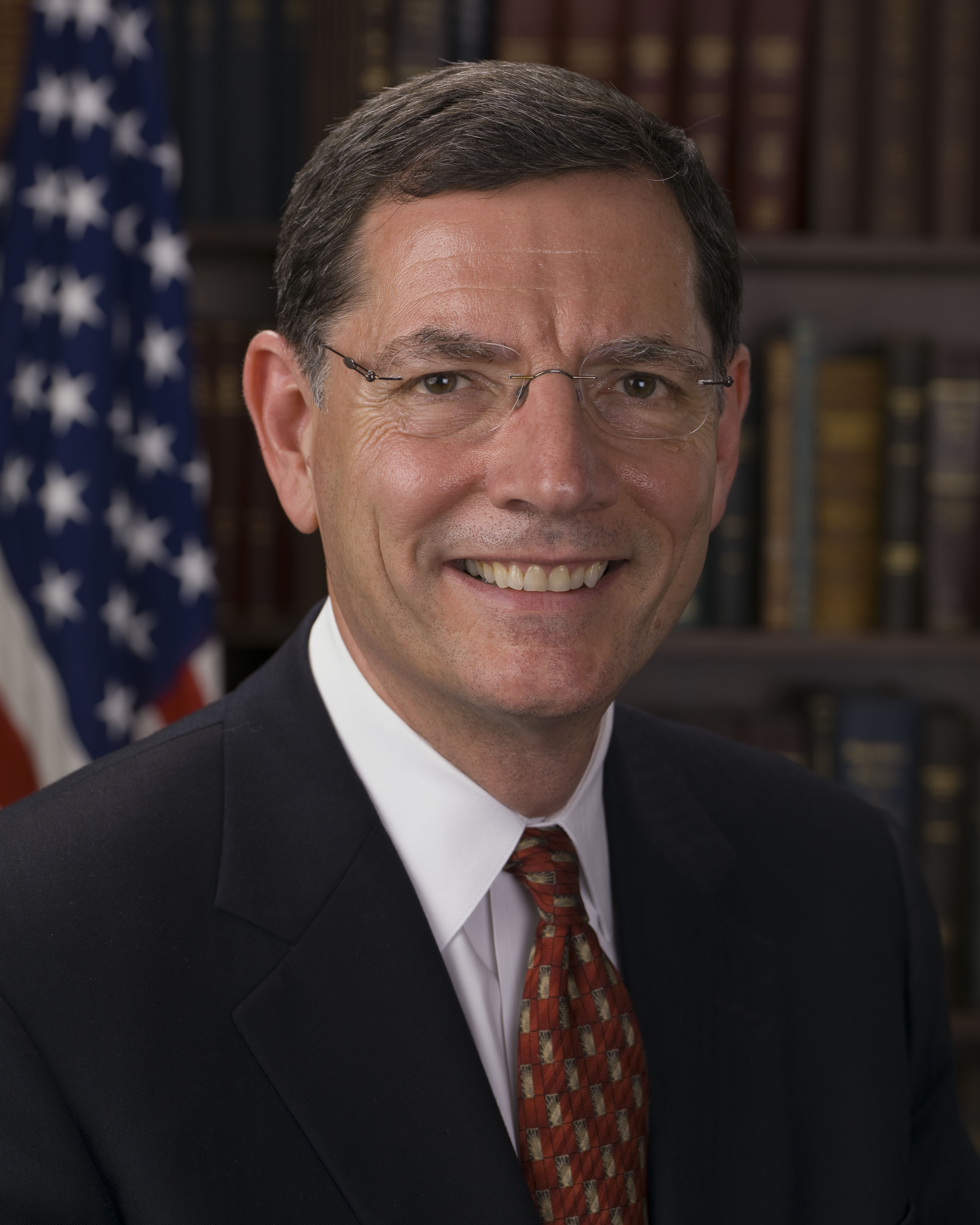
John Barrasso

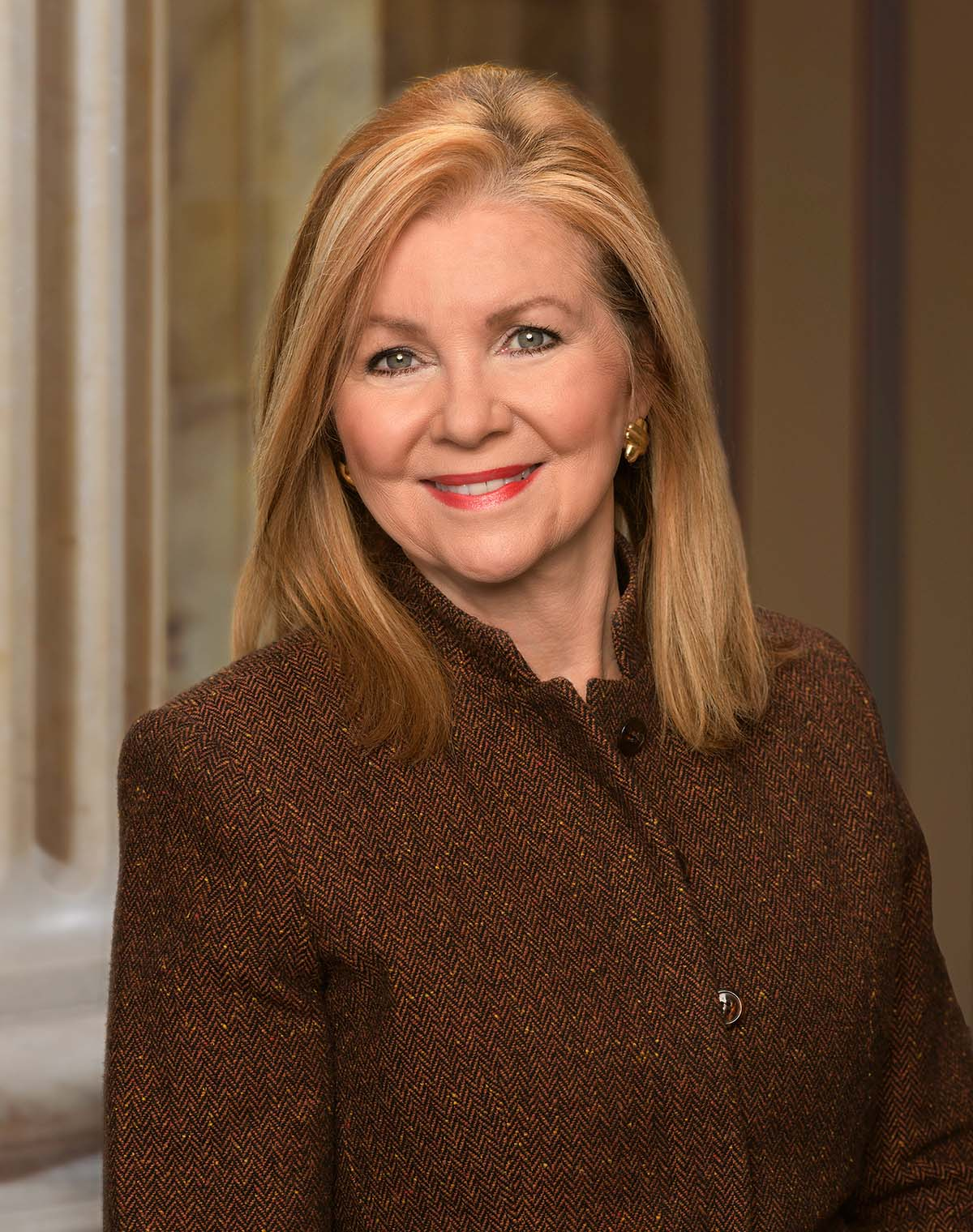
Marsha Blackburn

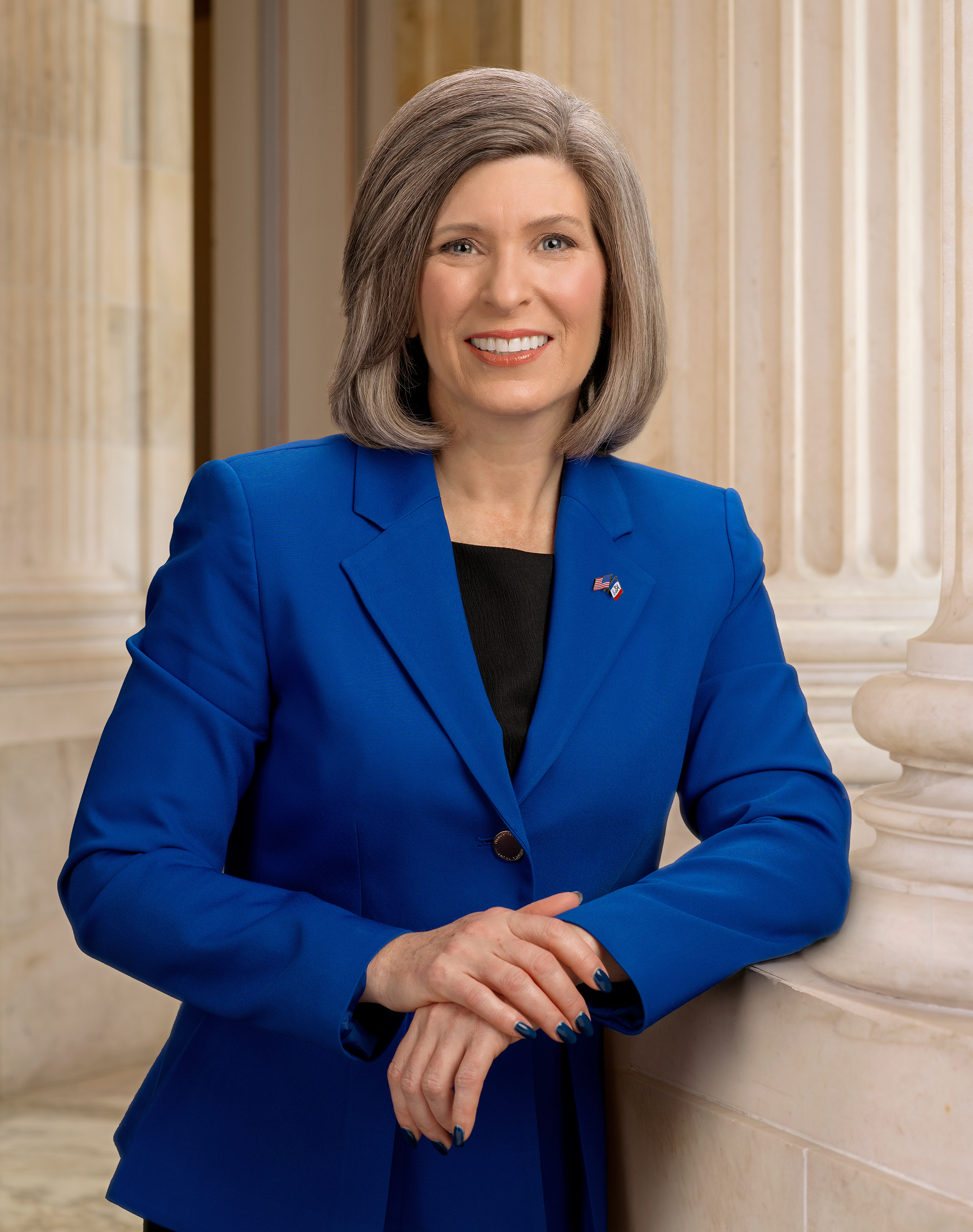
Joni Ernst

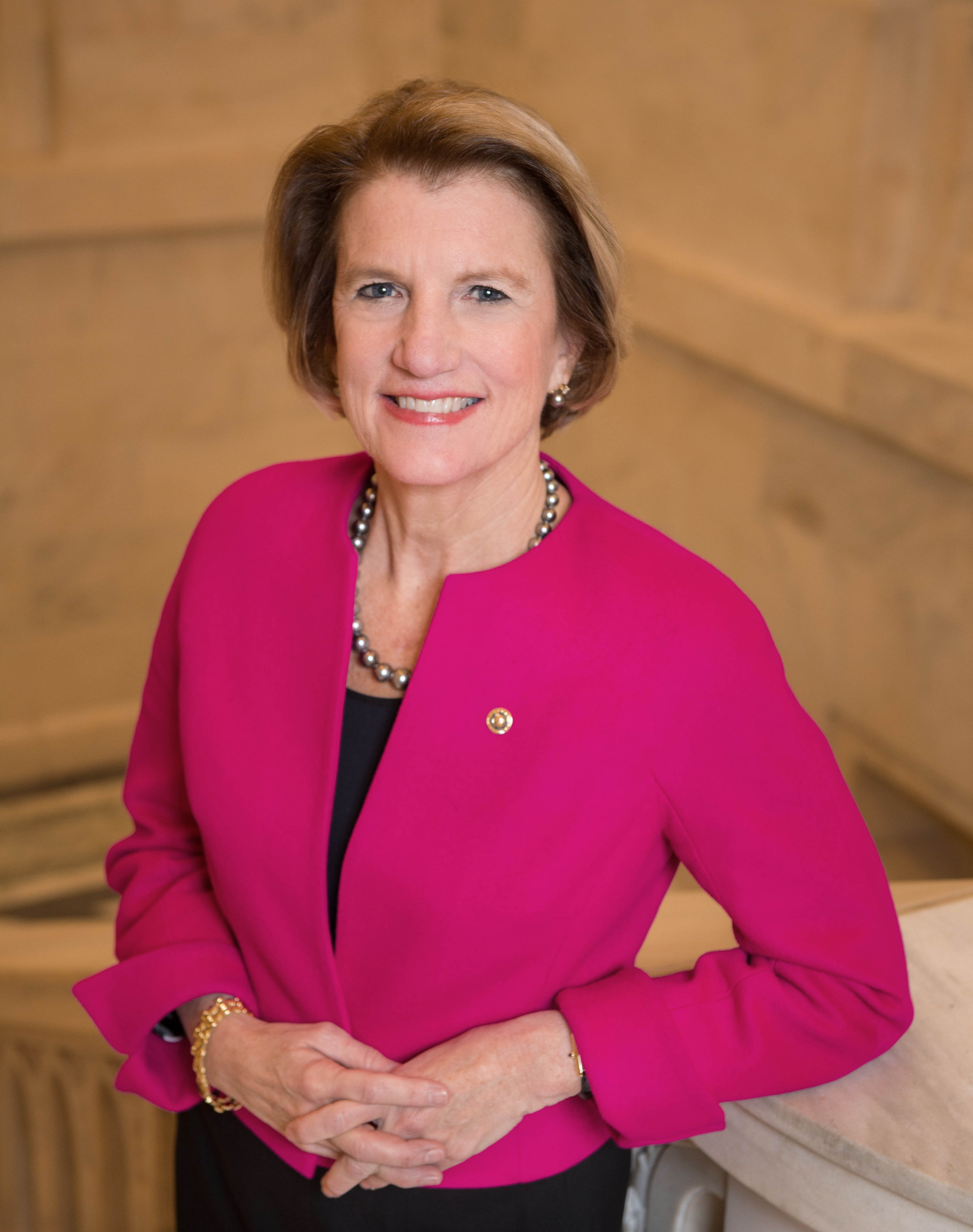
Shelley Moore Capito

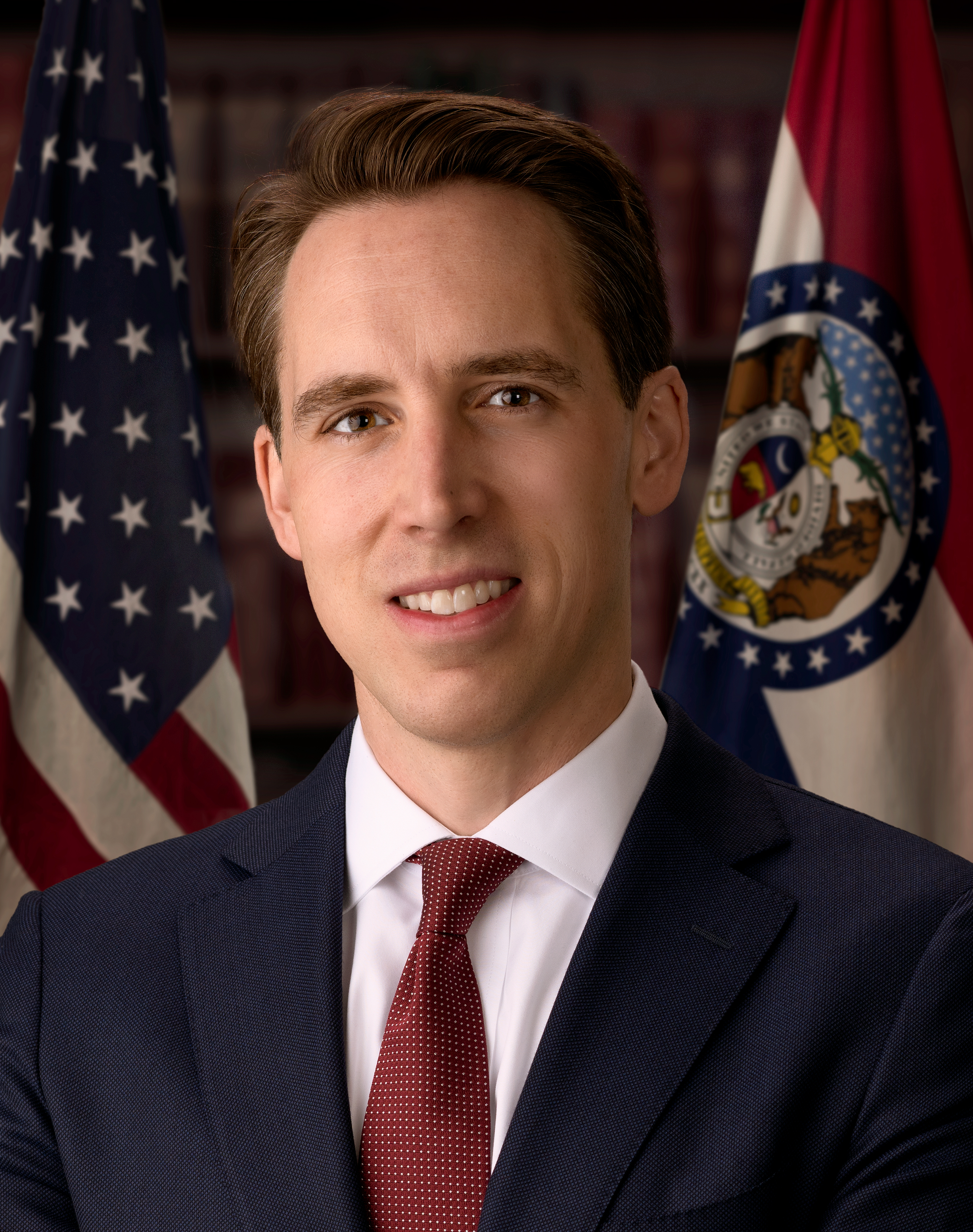
Josh Hawley

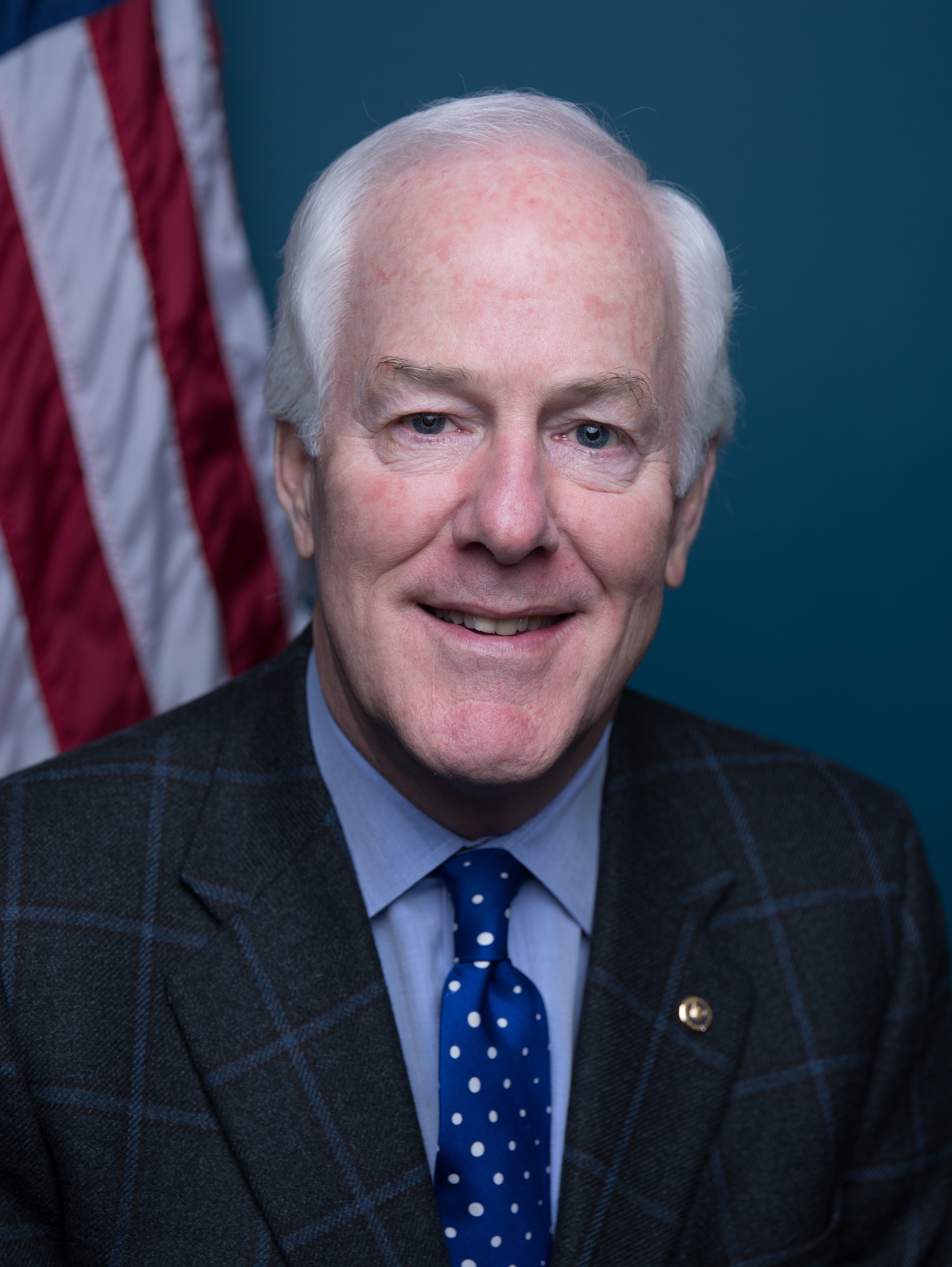
John Cornyn

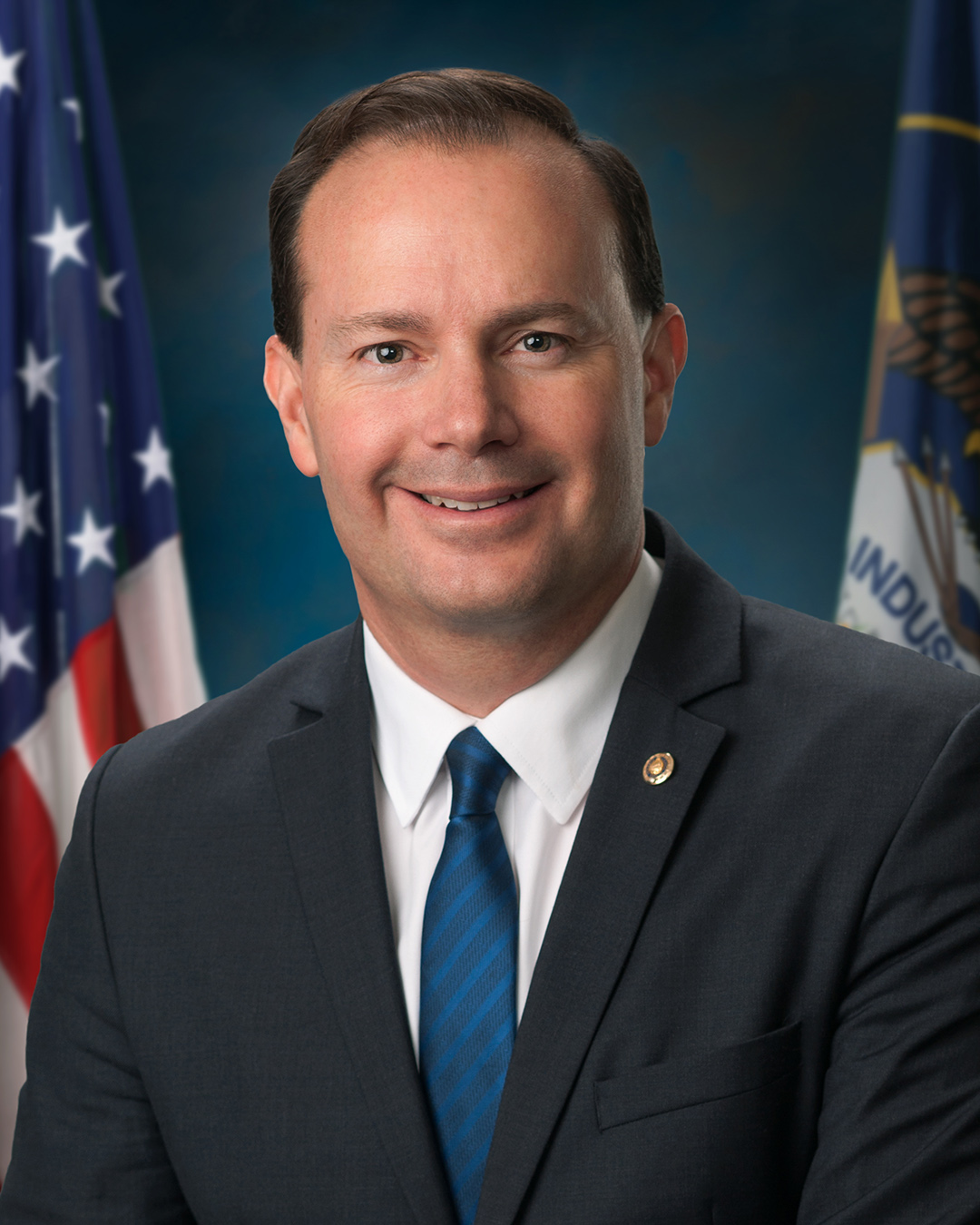
Mike Lee

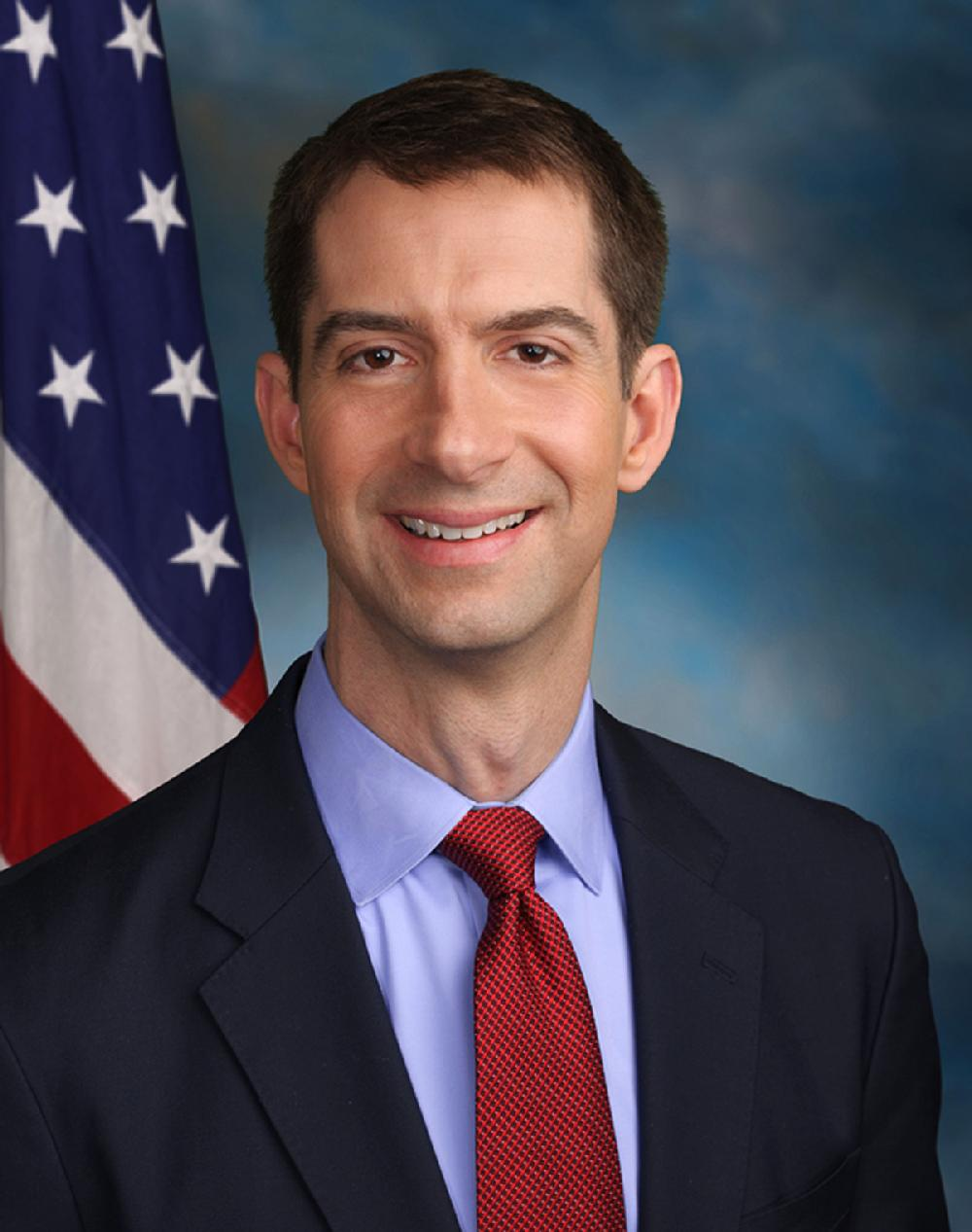
Tom Cotton

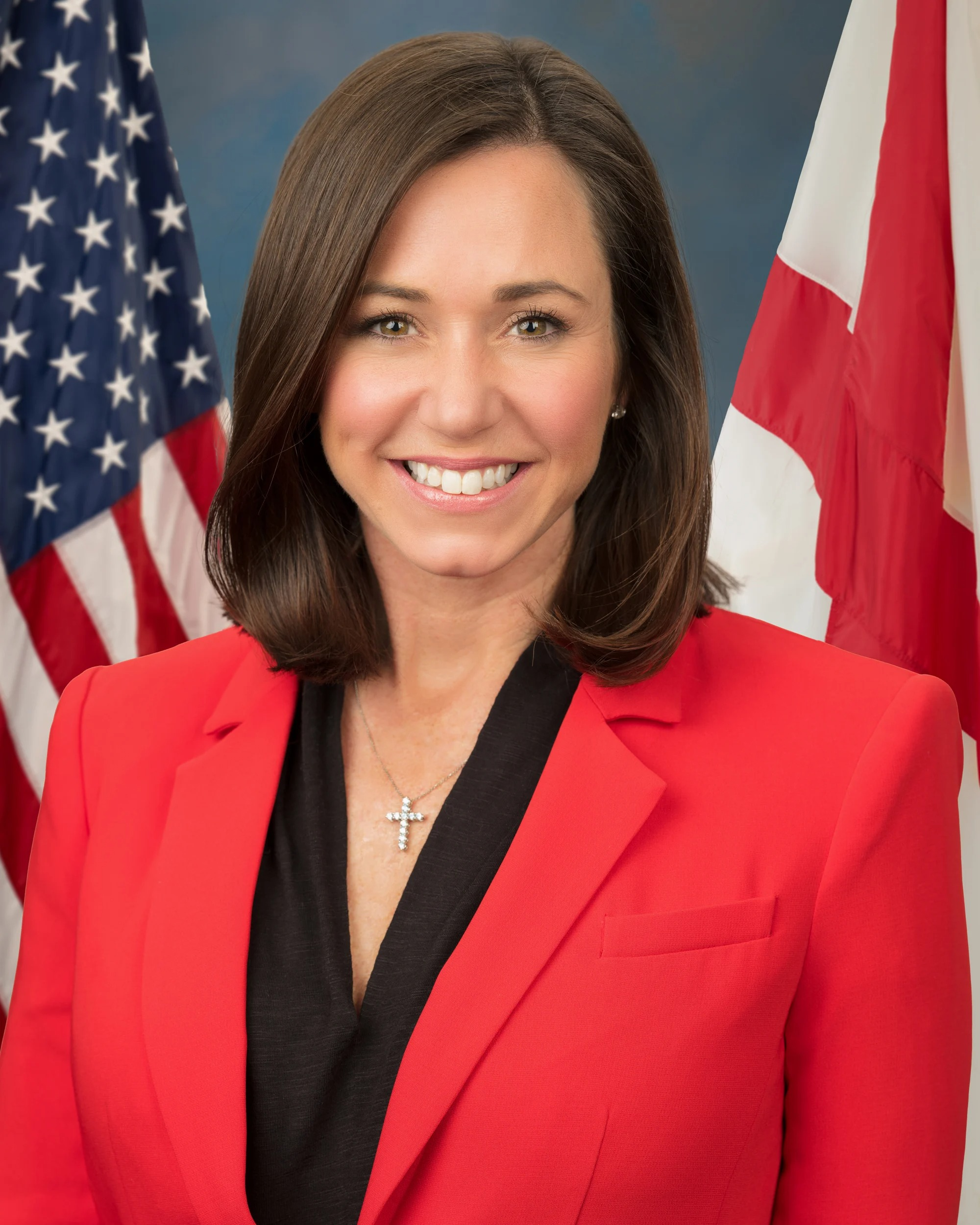
Katie Britt

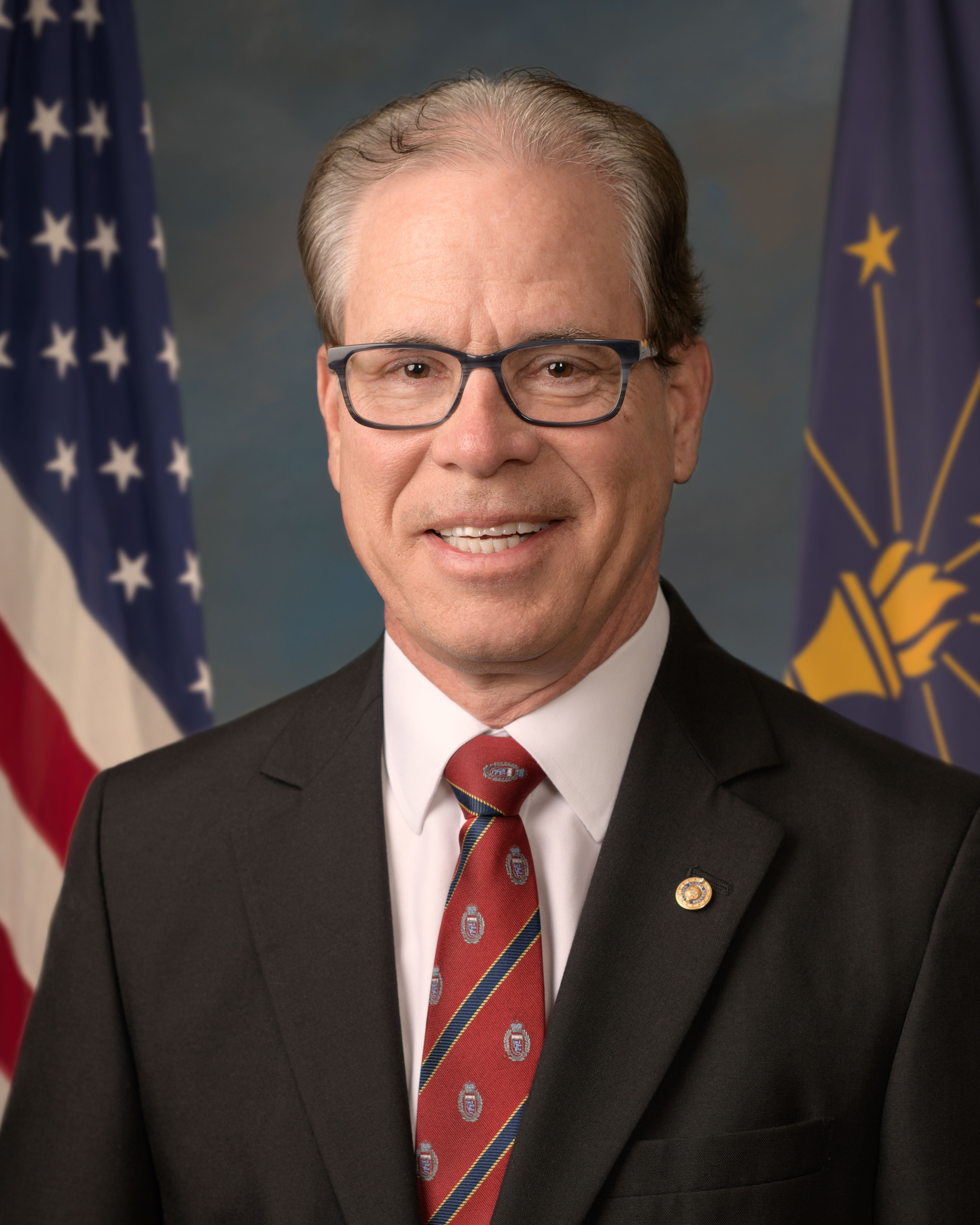
Mike Braun

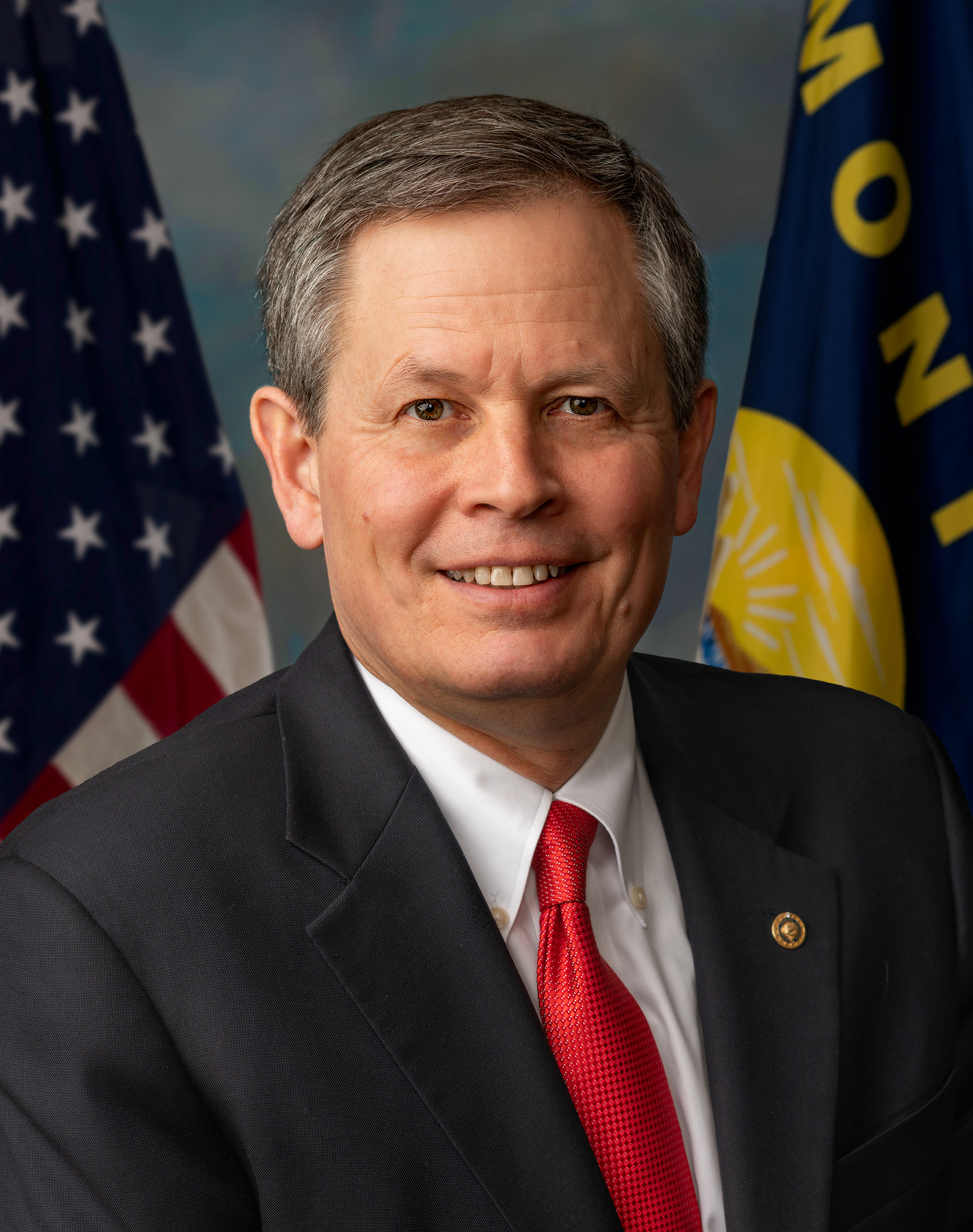
Steve Daines

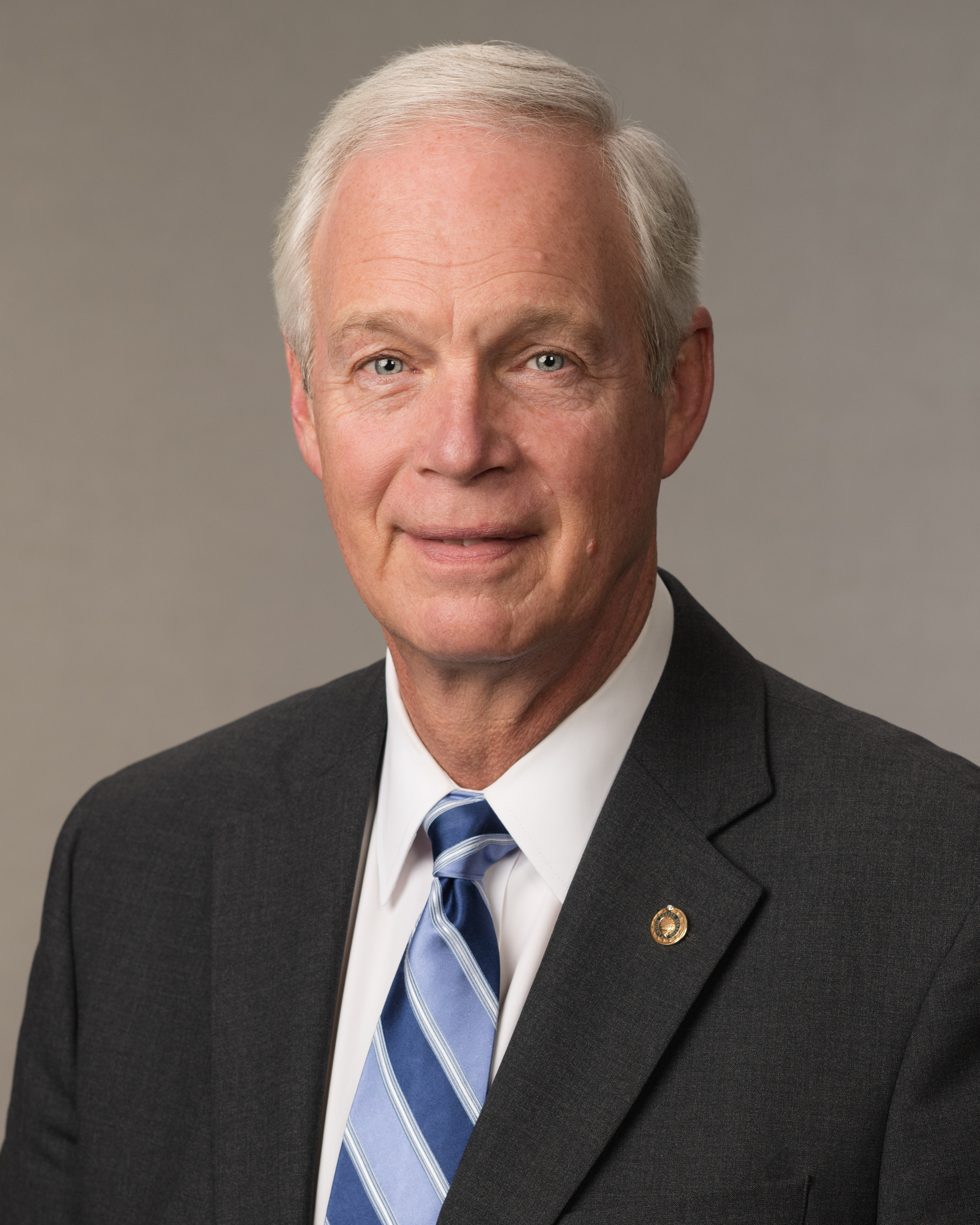
Ron Johnson

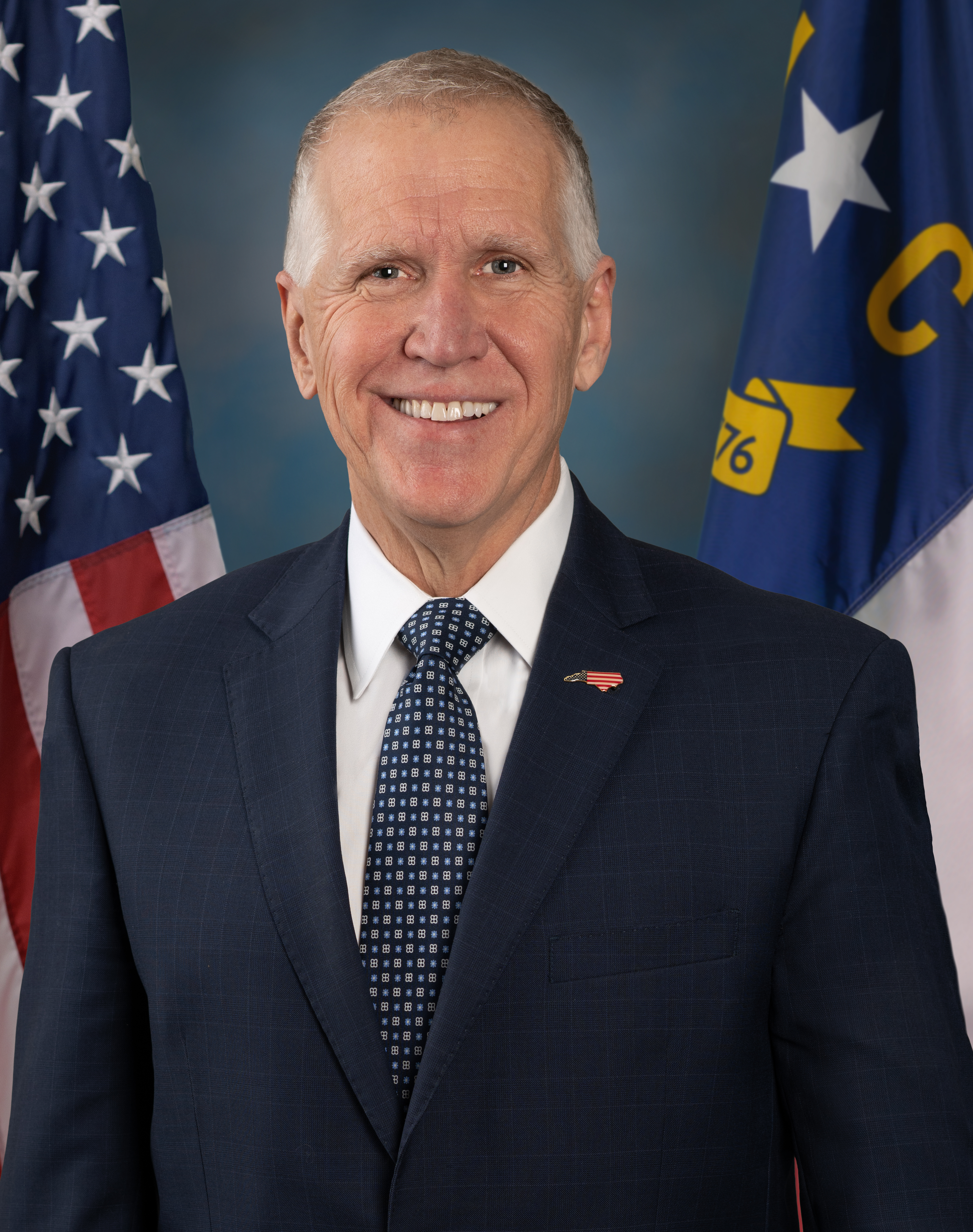
Thom Tillis

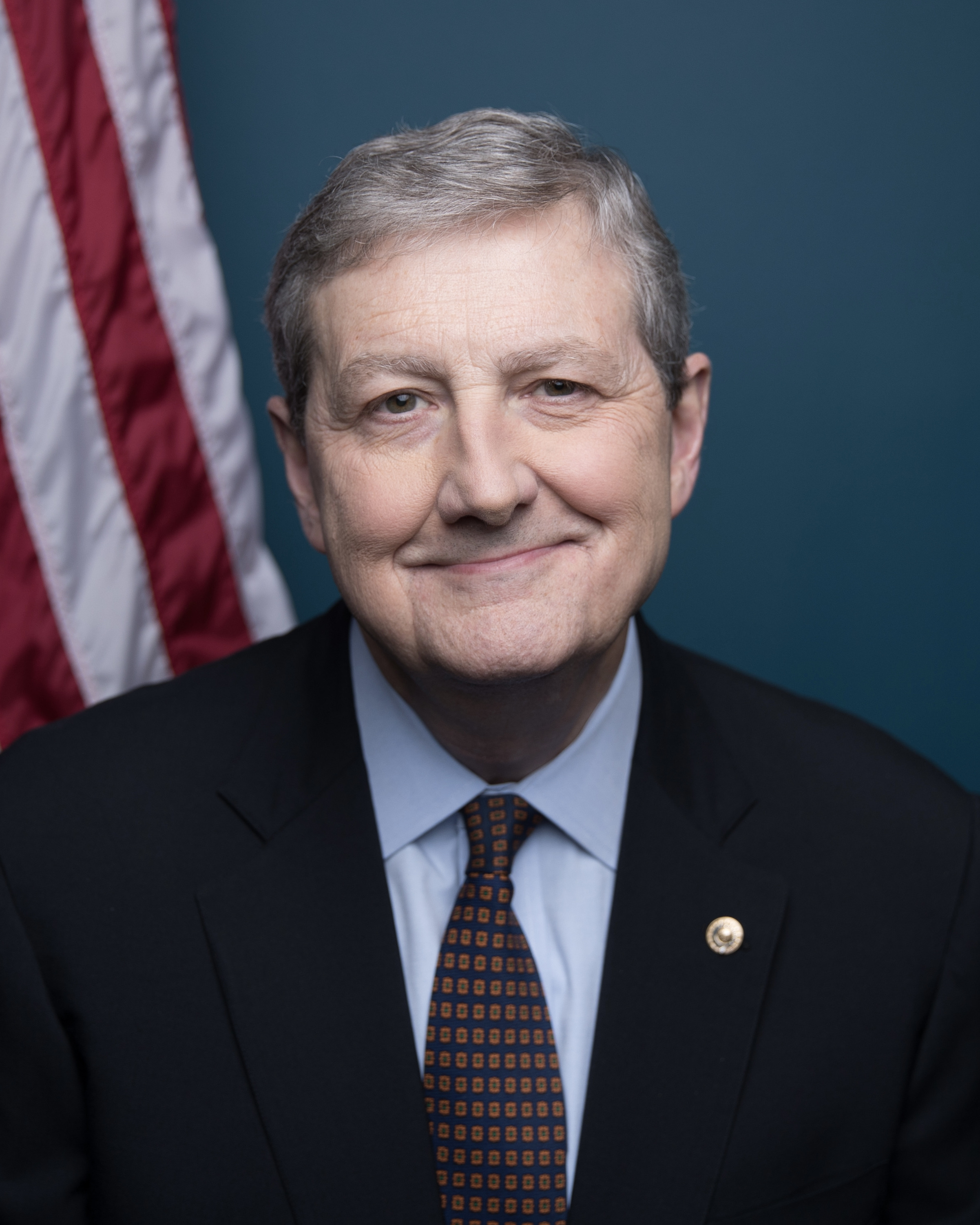
John Kennedy

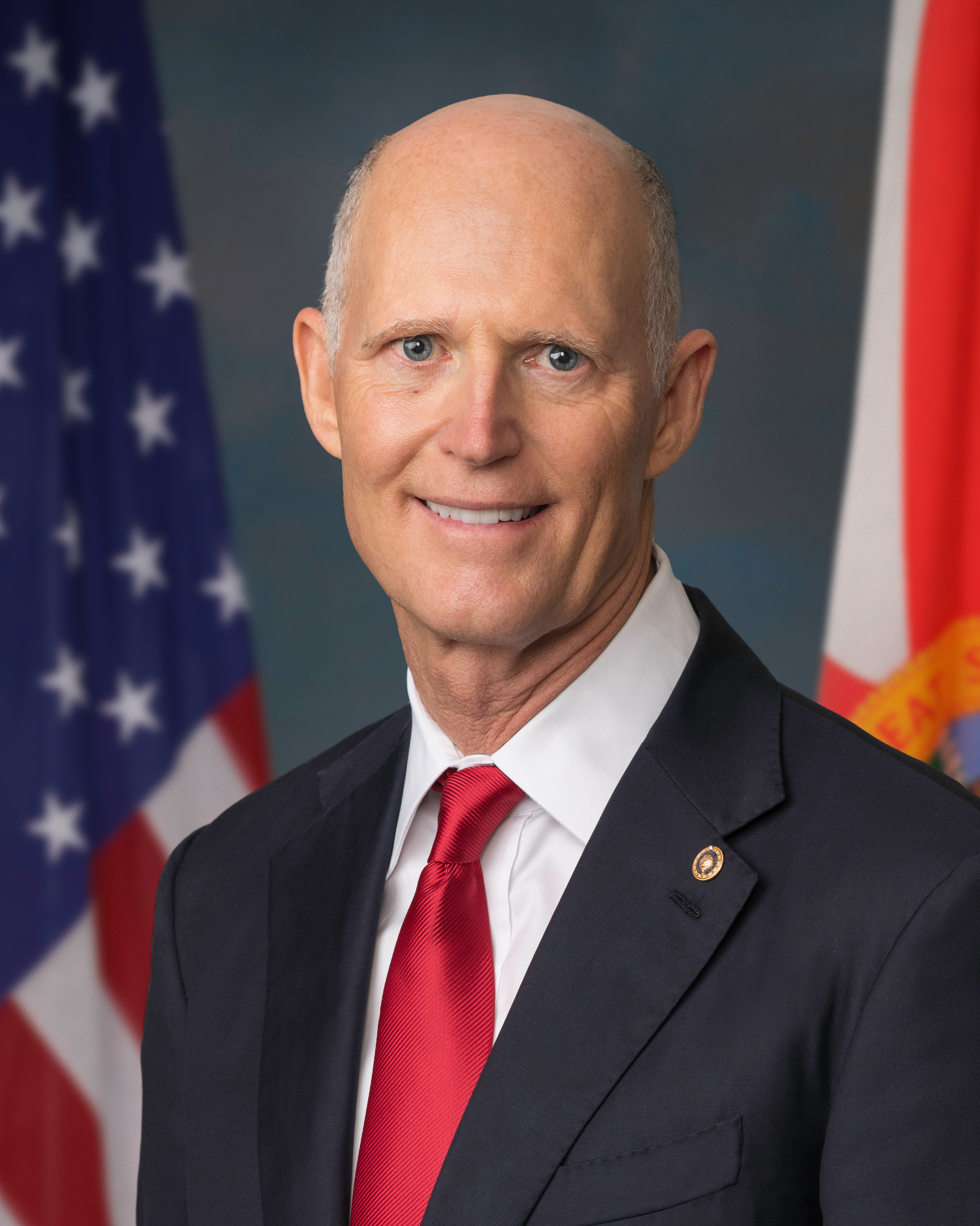
Rick Scott

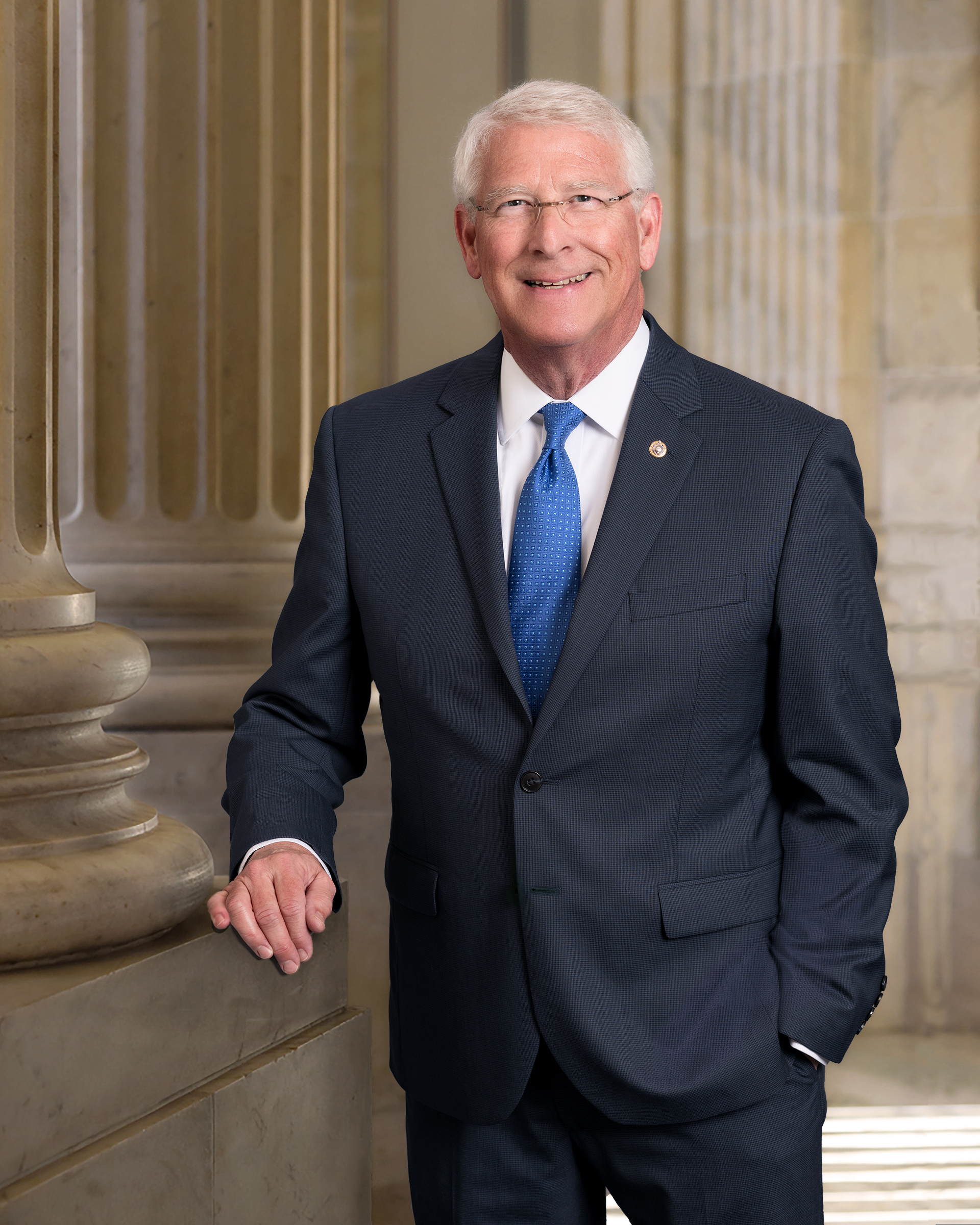
Roger Wicker

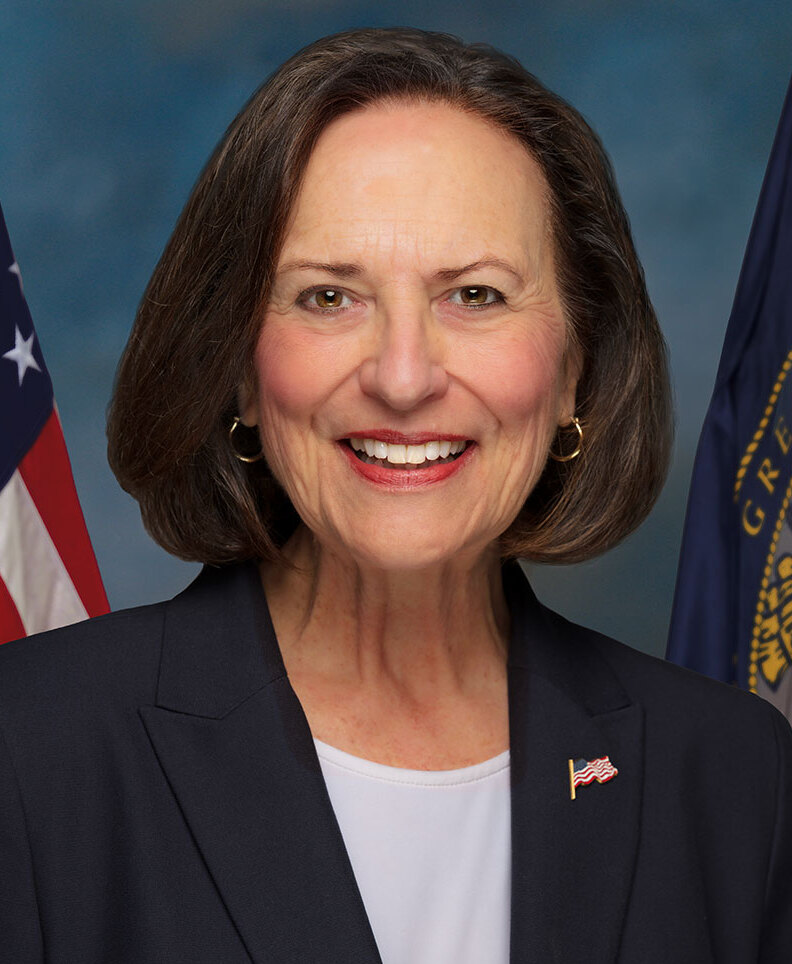
Deb Fischer

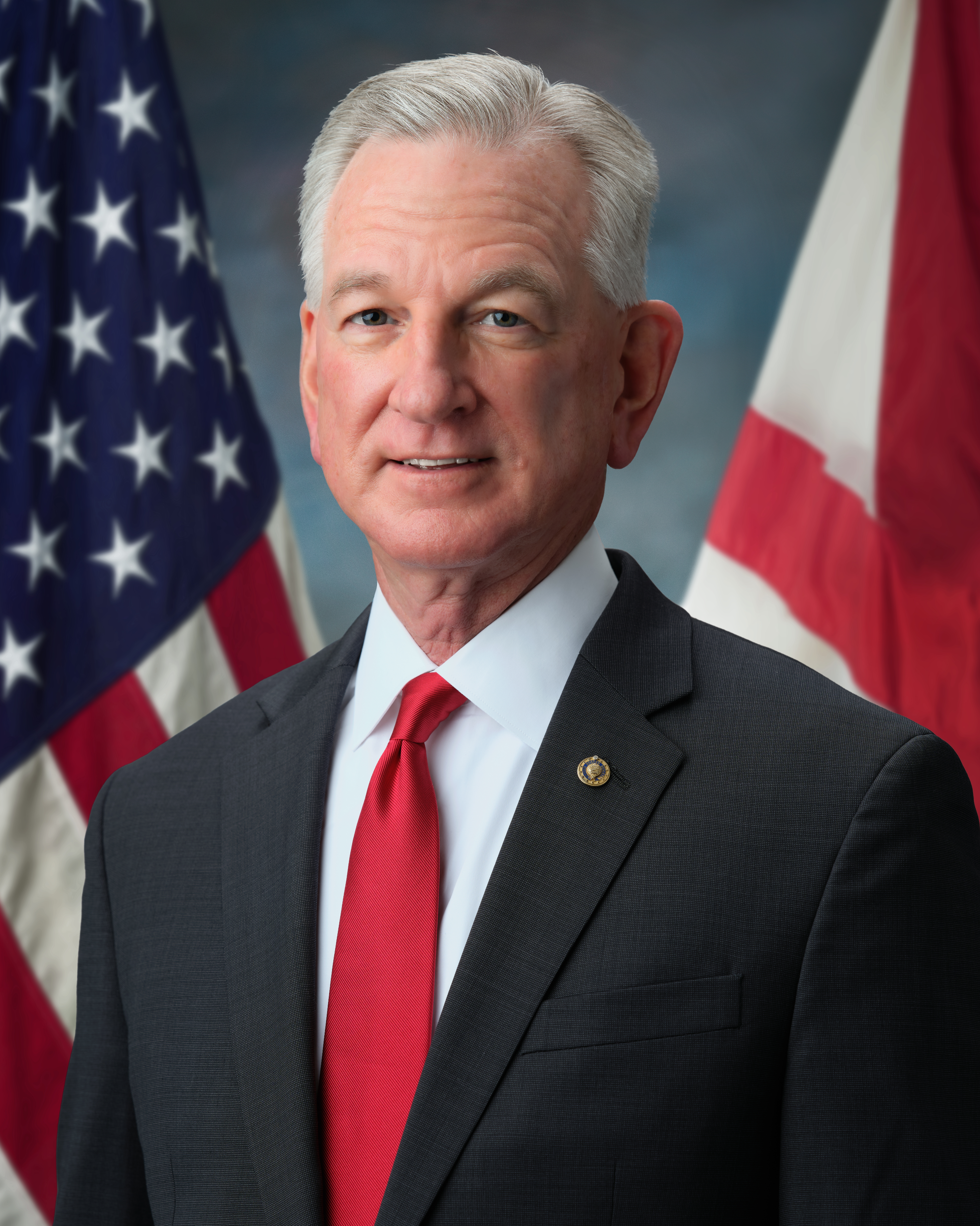
Tommy Tuberville

- John Barrasso, Wyoming (2007–present)
- Marsha Blackburn, Tennessee (2019–present)
- John Boozman, Arkansas (2011–present)
- Mike Braun, Indiana (2019–2025)
- Katie Britt, Alabama (2023–present)
- Ted Budd, North Carolina (2023–present)
- John Cornyn, Texas (2002–present)
- Tom Cotton, Arkansas (2015–present)
- Kevin Cramer, North Dakota (2019–present)
- Mike Crapo, Idaho (1999–present)
- Ted Cruz, Texas (2013–present)
- Steve Daines, Montana (2015–present)
- Joni Ernst, Iowa (2015–present)
- Deb Fischer, Nebraska (2013–present)
- Lindsey Graham, South Carolina (2003–2026)
- Chuck Grassley, Iowa (1981–present)
- Bill Hagerty, Tennessee (2021–present)
- Josh Hawley, Missouri (2019–present)
- John Hoeven, North Dakota (2011–present)
- Ron Johnson, Wisconsin (2011–present)
- Cindy Hyde-Smith, Mississippi (2018–present)
- John Kennedy, Louisiana (2017–present)
- James Lankford, Oklahoma (2015–present)
- Mike Lee, Utah (2011–present)
- Cynthia Lummis, Wyoming (2021–present)
- Roger Marshall, Kansas (2021–present)
- Mitch McConnell, Kentucky (1985–present), Senate Minority Leader (2007–2015, 2021–2025)
- Shelley Moore Capito, West Virginia (2015–present)
- Markwayne Mullin, Oklahoma (2023–2026)
- Pete Ricketts, Nebraska (2023–present)
- Jim Risch, Idaho (2009–present)
- Mike Rounds, South Dakota (2015–present)
- Marco Rubio, Florida (2011–2025)
- Eric Schmitt, Missouri (2023–present)
- Rick Scott, Florida (2019–present)
- Tim Scott, South Carolina (2013–present)
- Dan Sullivan, Alaska (2015–present)
- John Thune, South Dakota (2005–present) and Senate Minority Whip (2021–2025)
- Thom Tillis, North Carolina (2015–present)
- Tommy Tuberville, Alabama (2021–present)
- JD Vance, Ohio (2023–2025) (running mate)
- Roger Wicker, Mississippi (2007–present)

== U.S. representatives ==
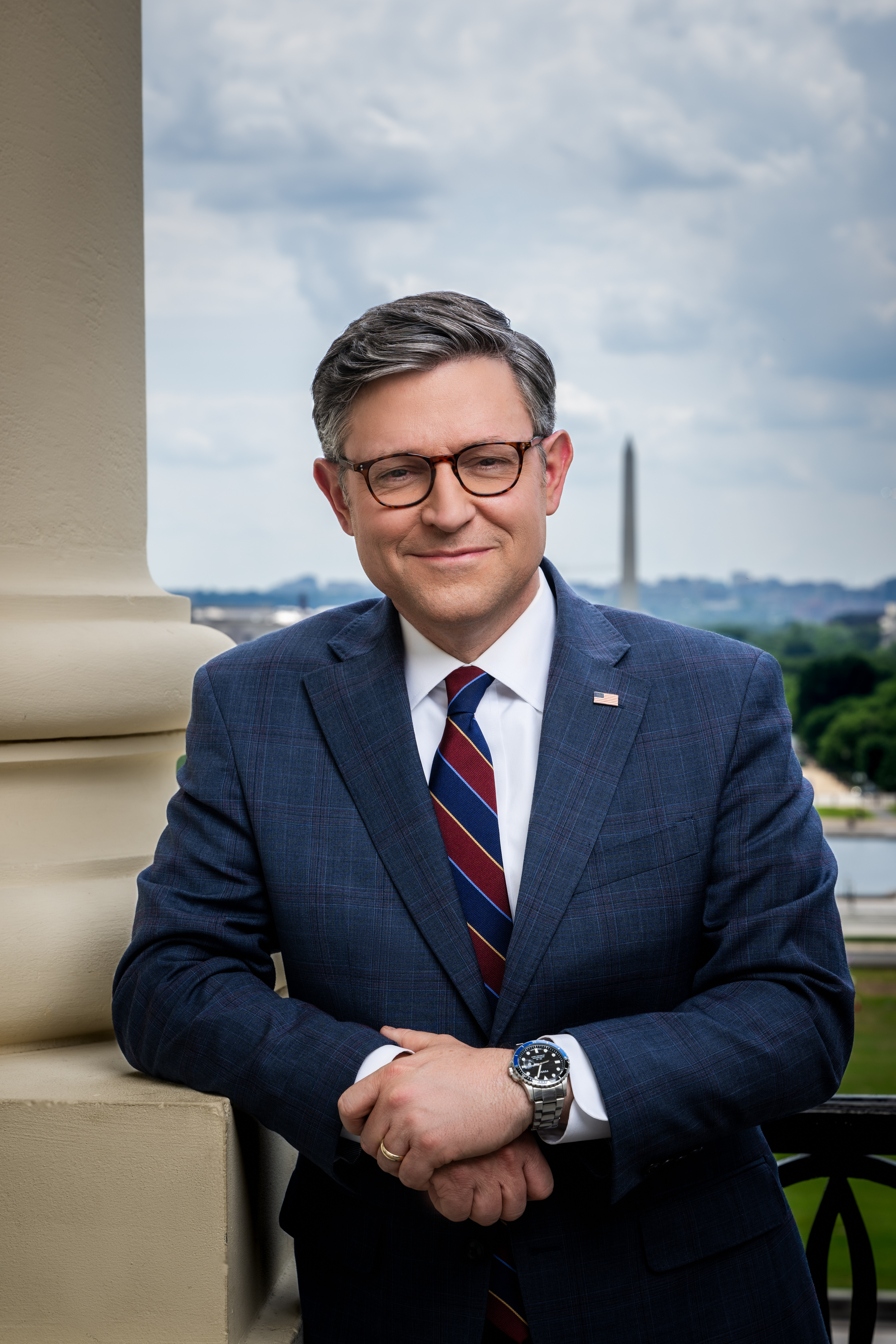
Mike Johnson

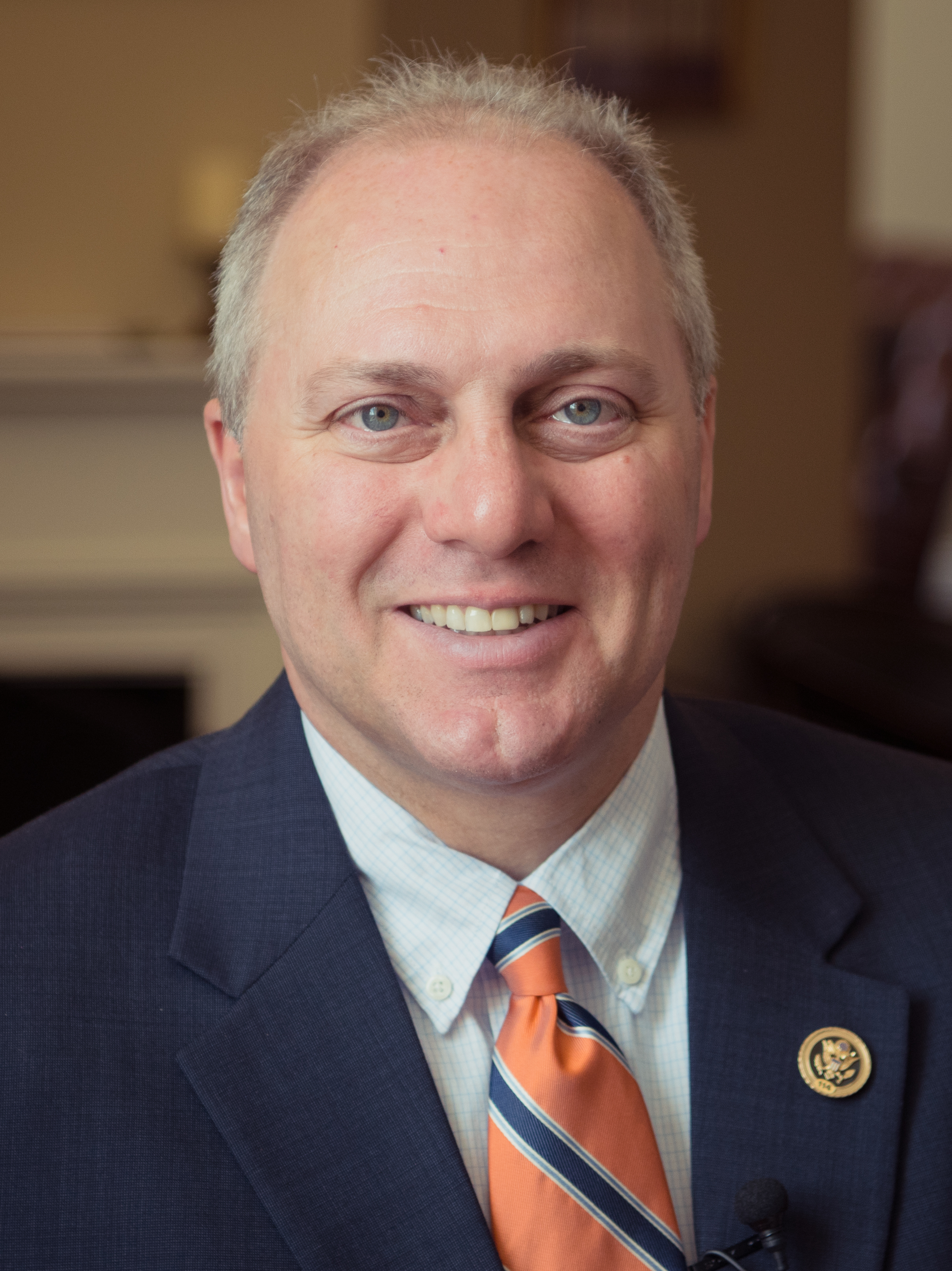
Steve Scalise

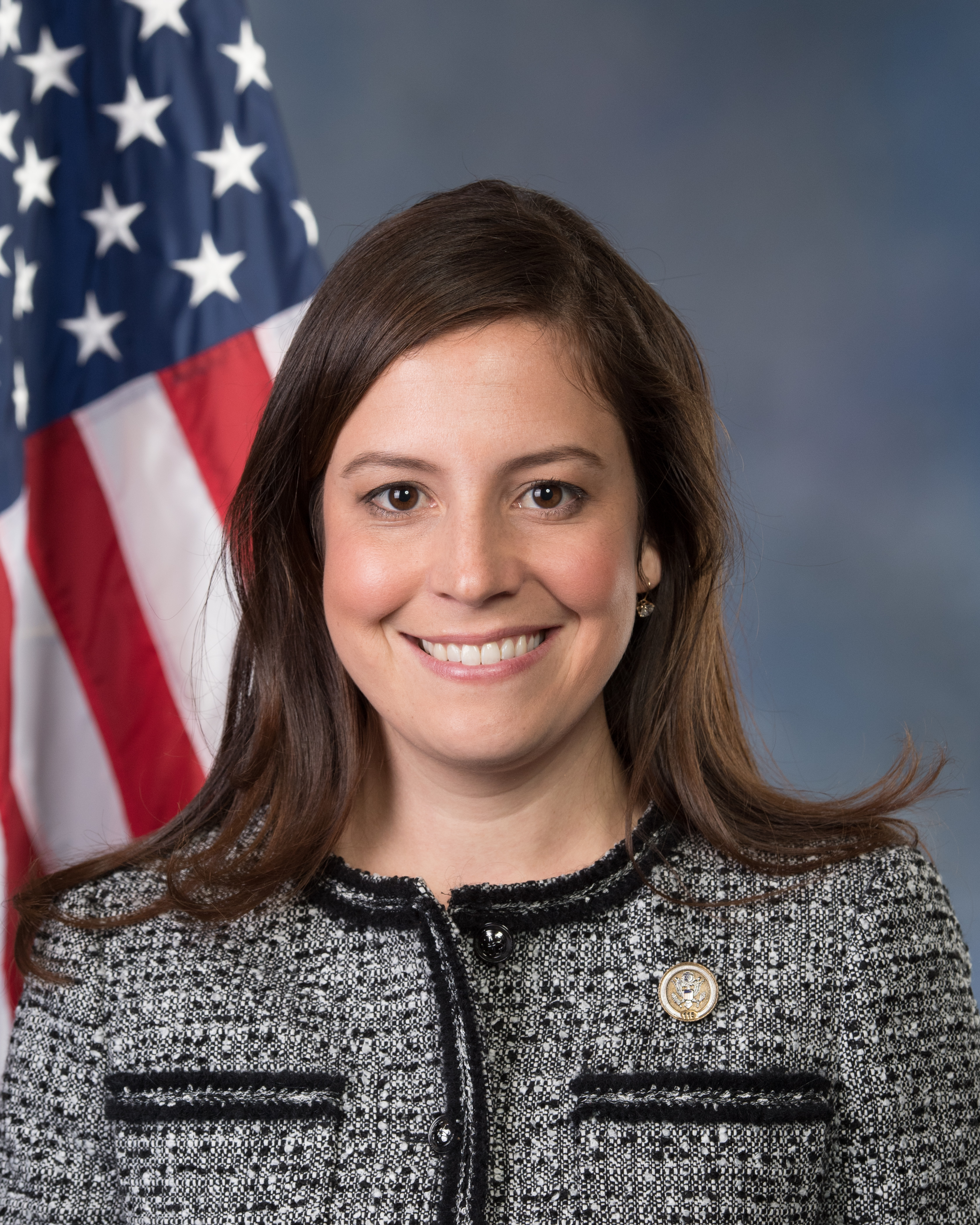
Elise Stefanik

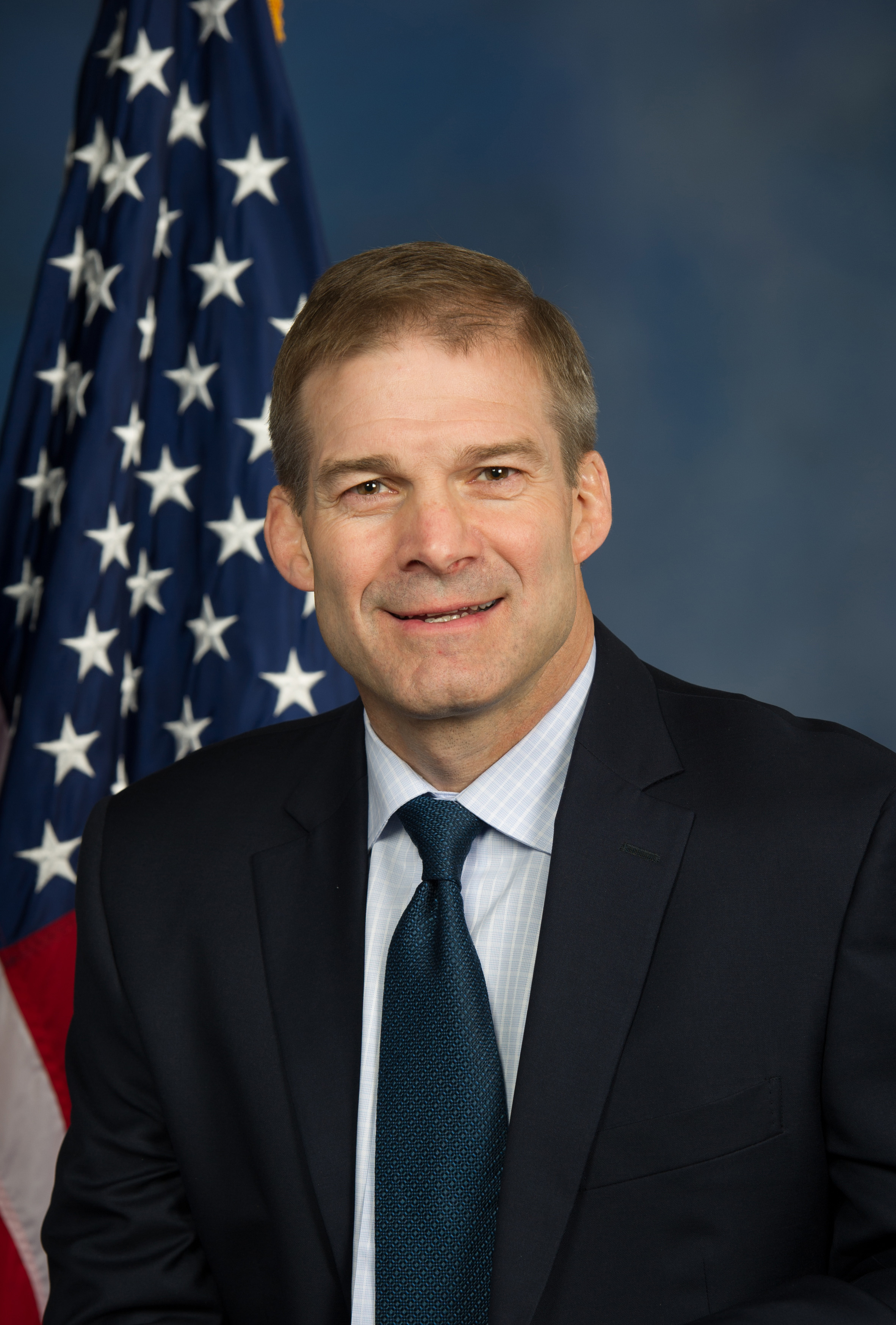
Jim Jordan

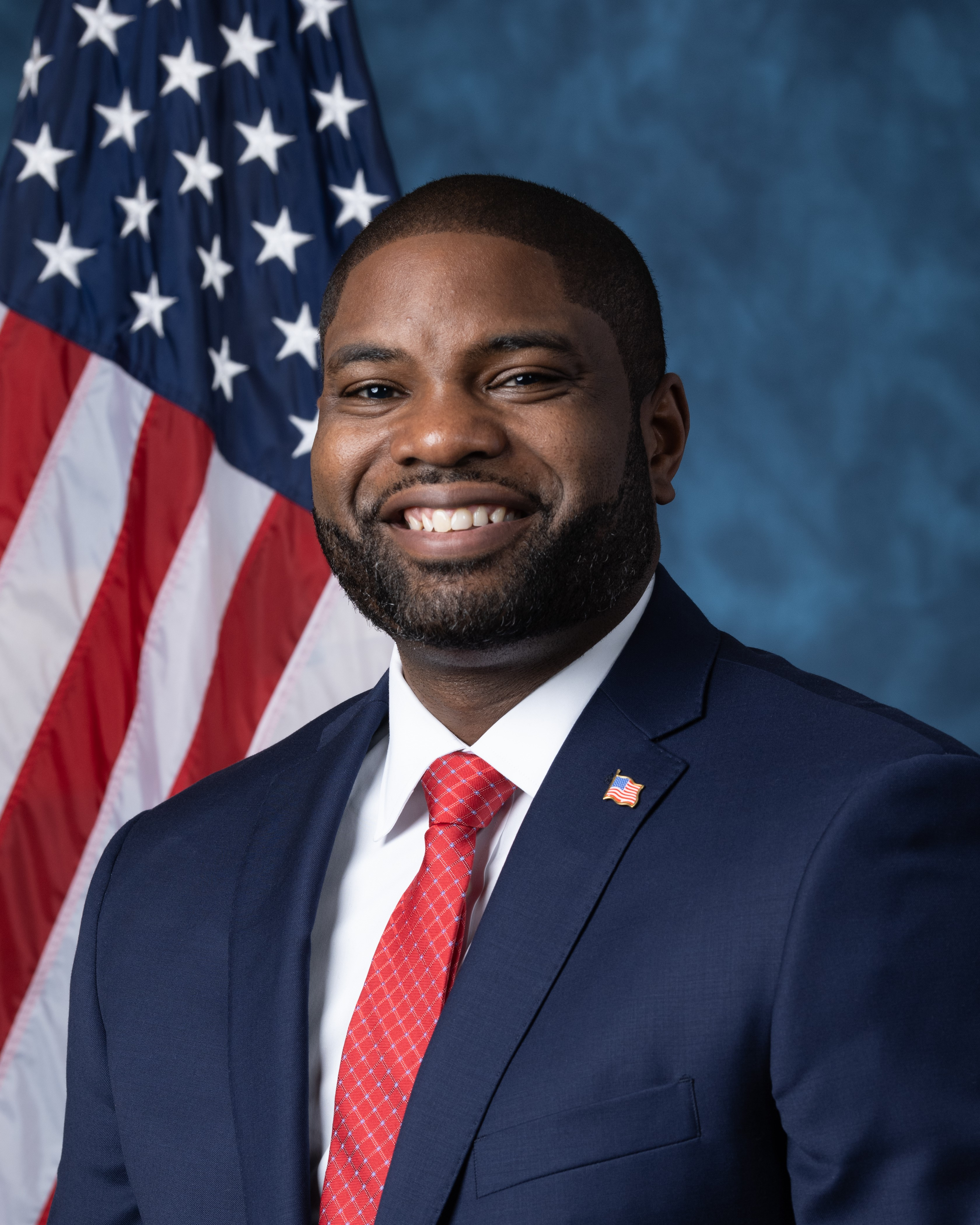
Byron Donalds

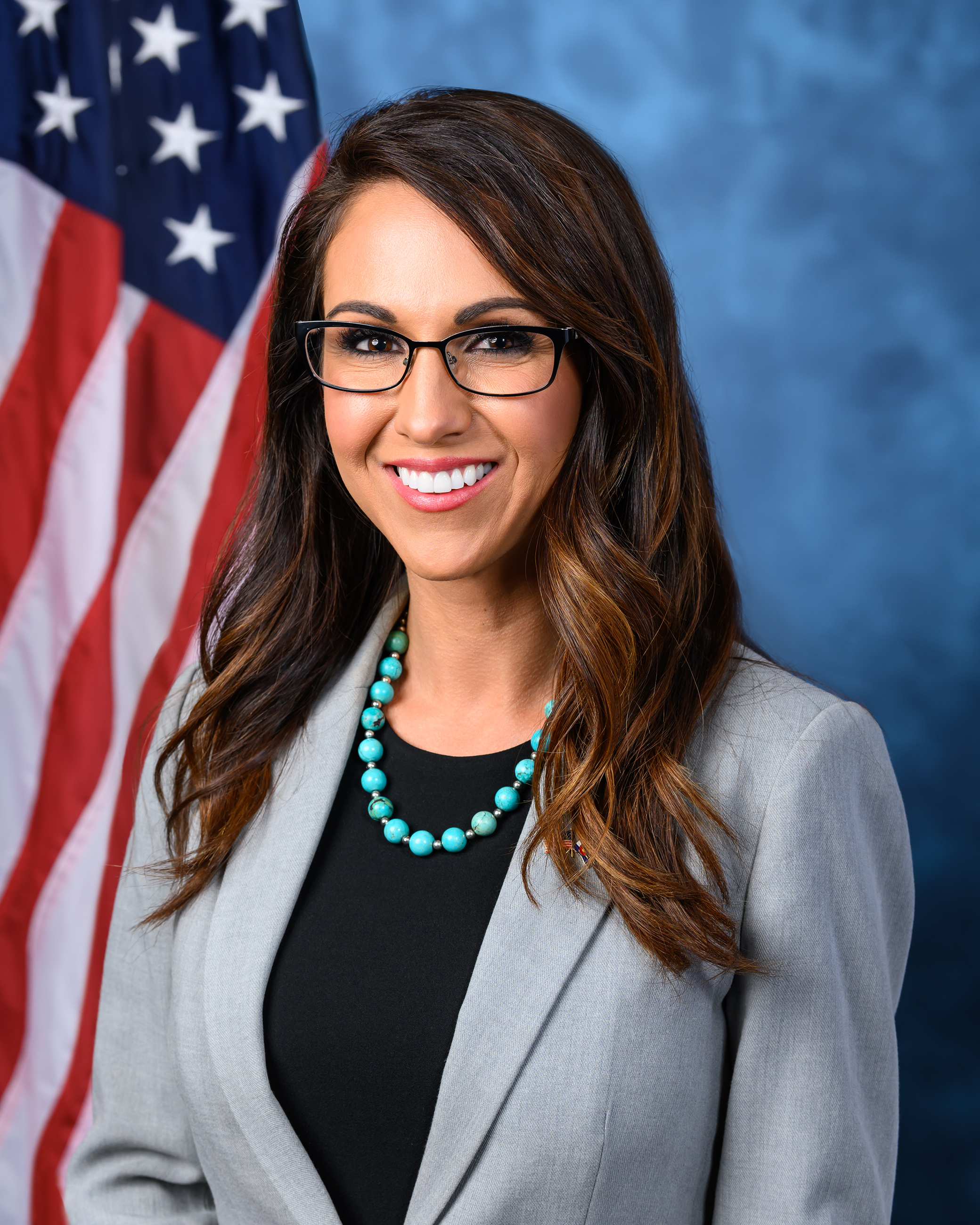
Lauren Boebert

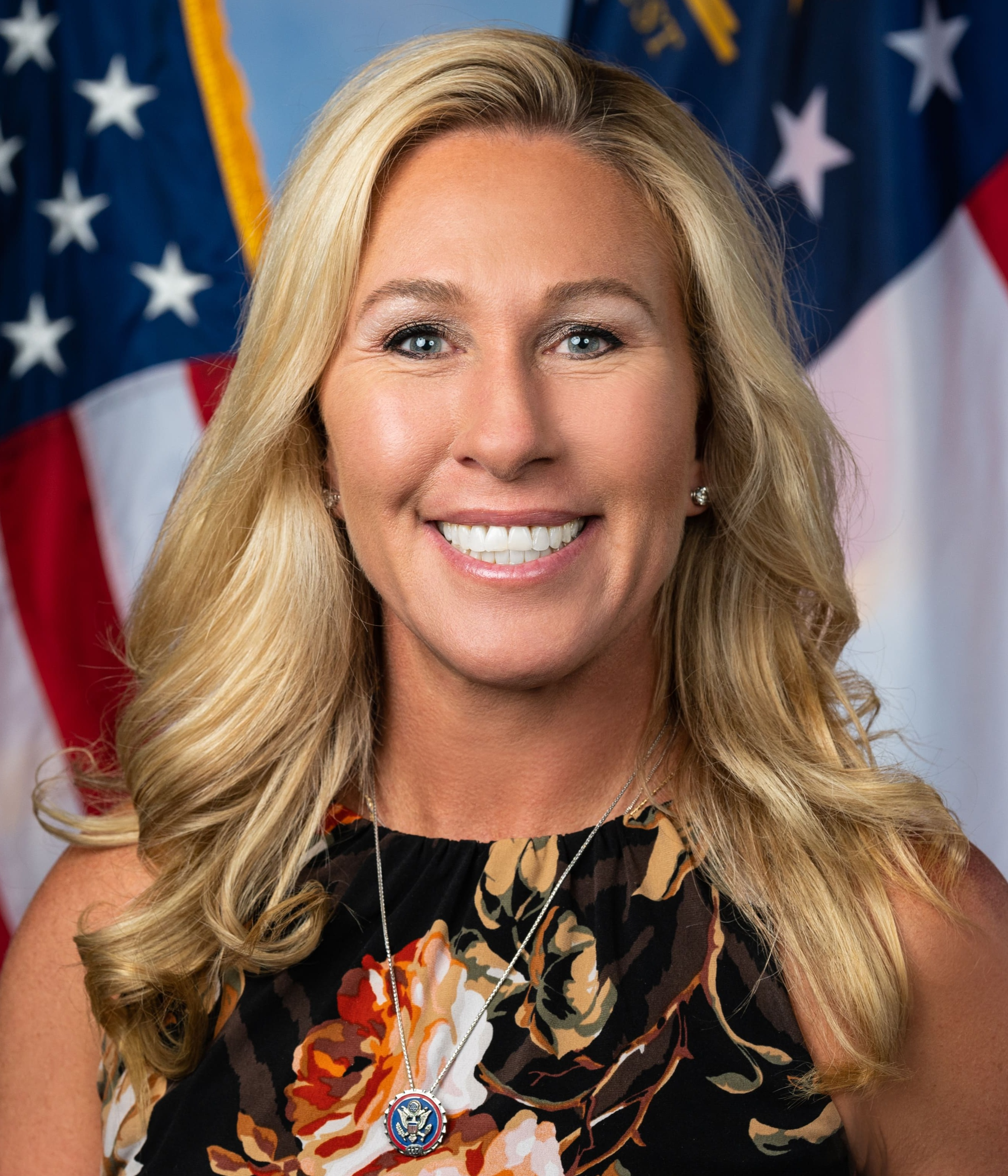
Marjorie Taylor Greene

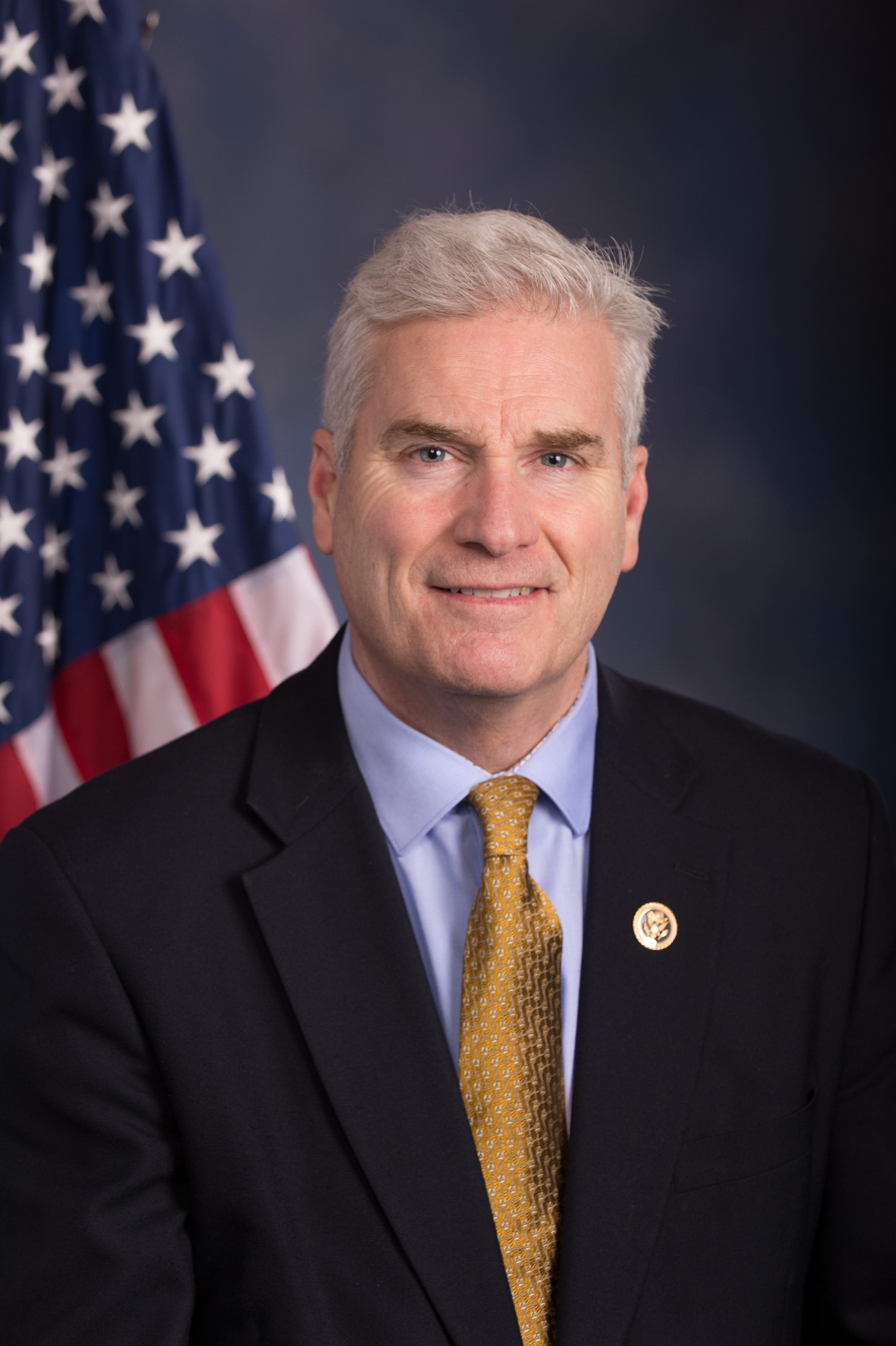
Tom Emmer

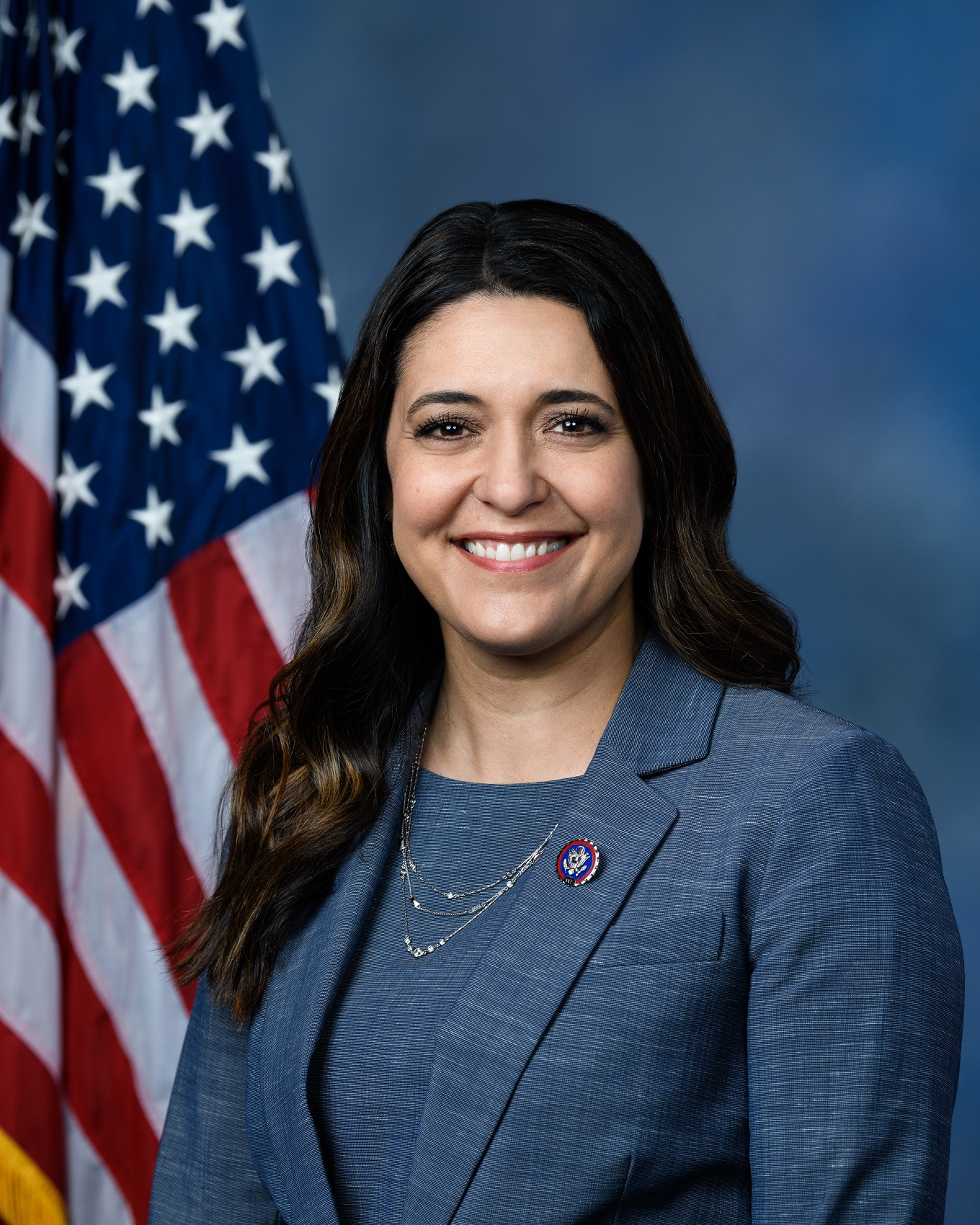
Stephanie Bice

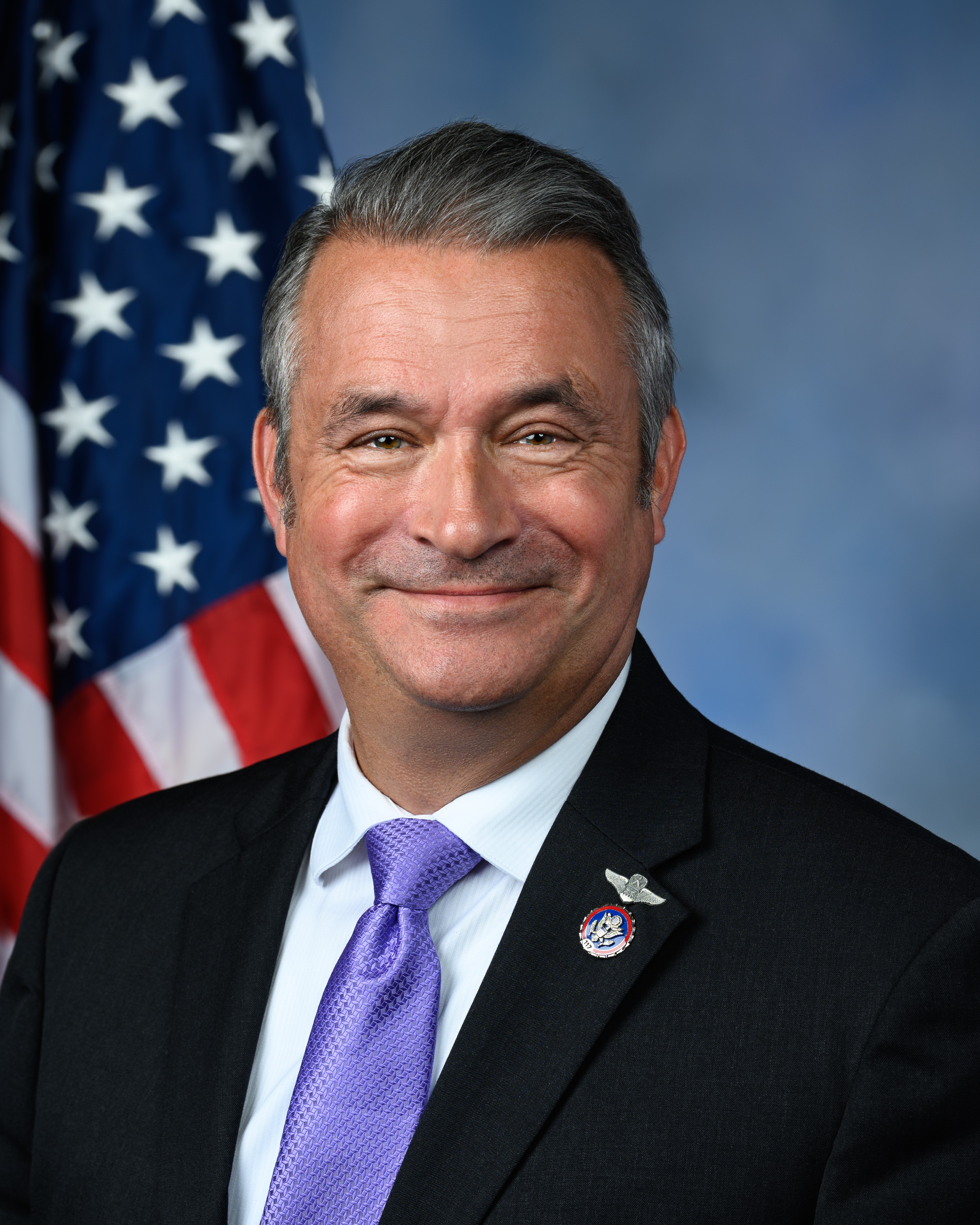
Don Bacon

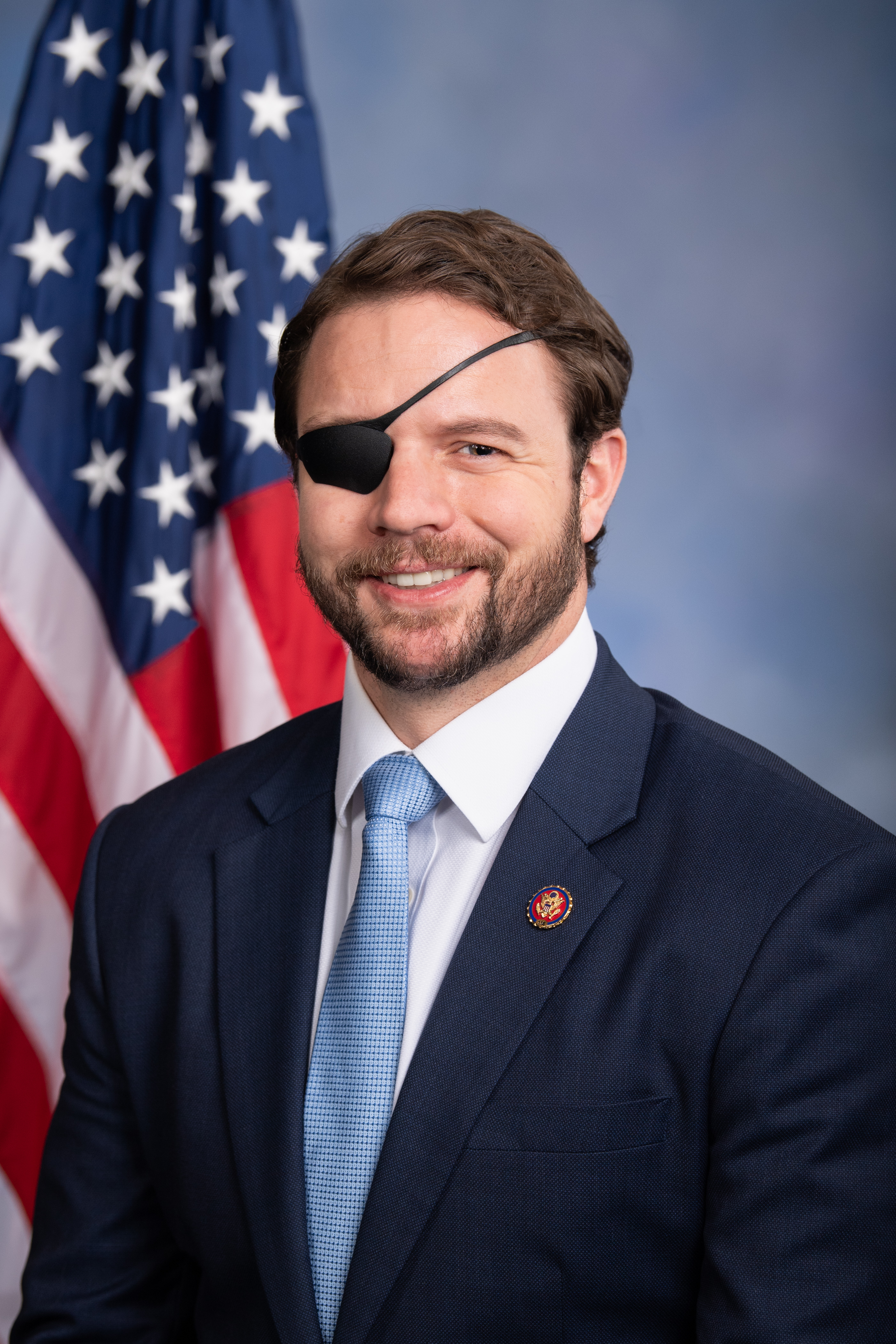
Dan Crenshaw

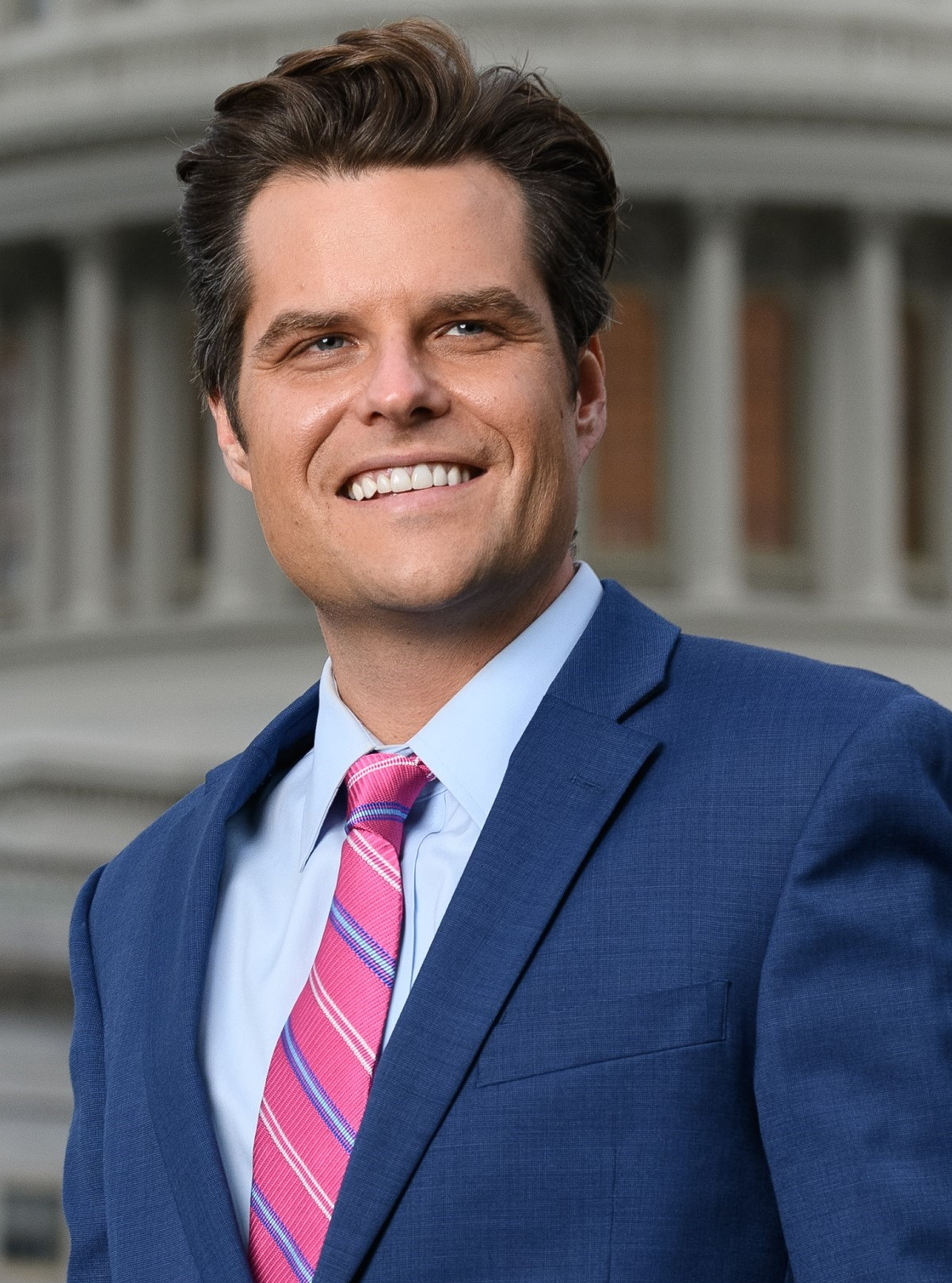
Matt Gaetz

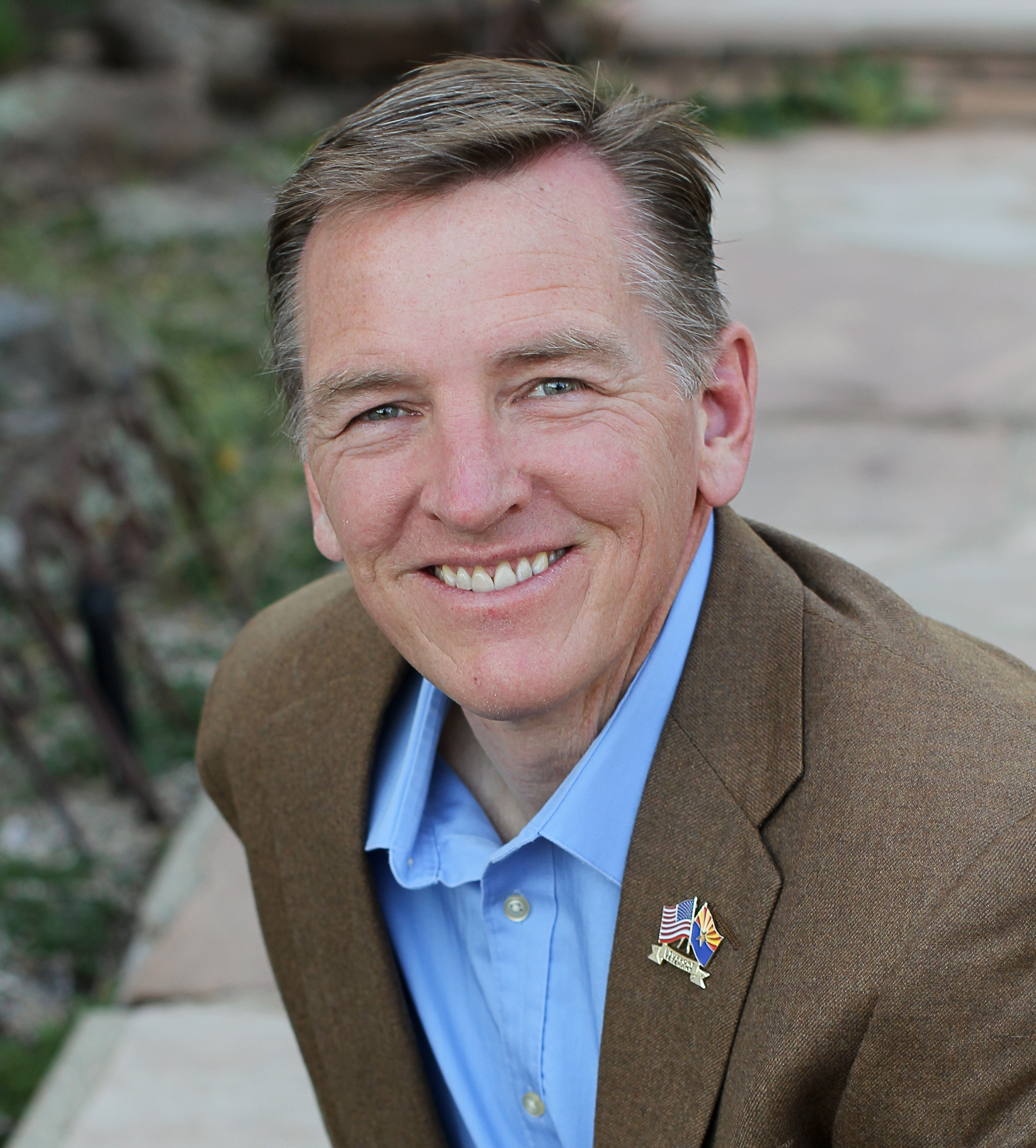
Paul Gosar

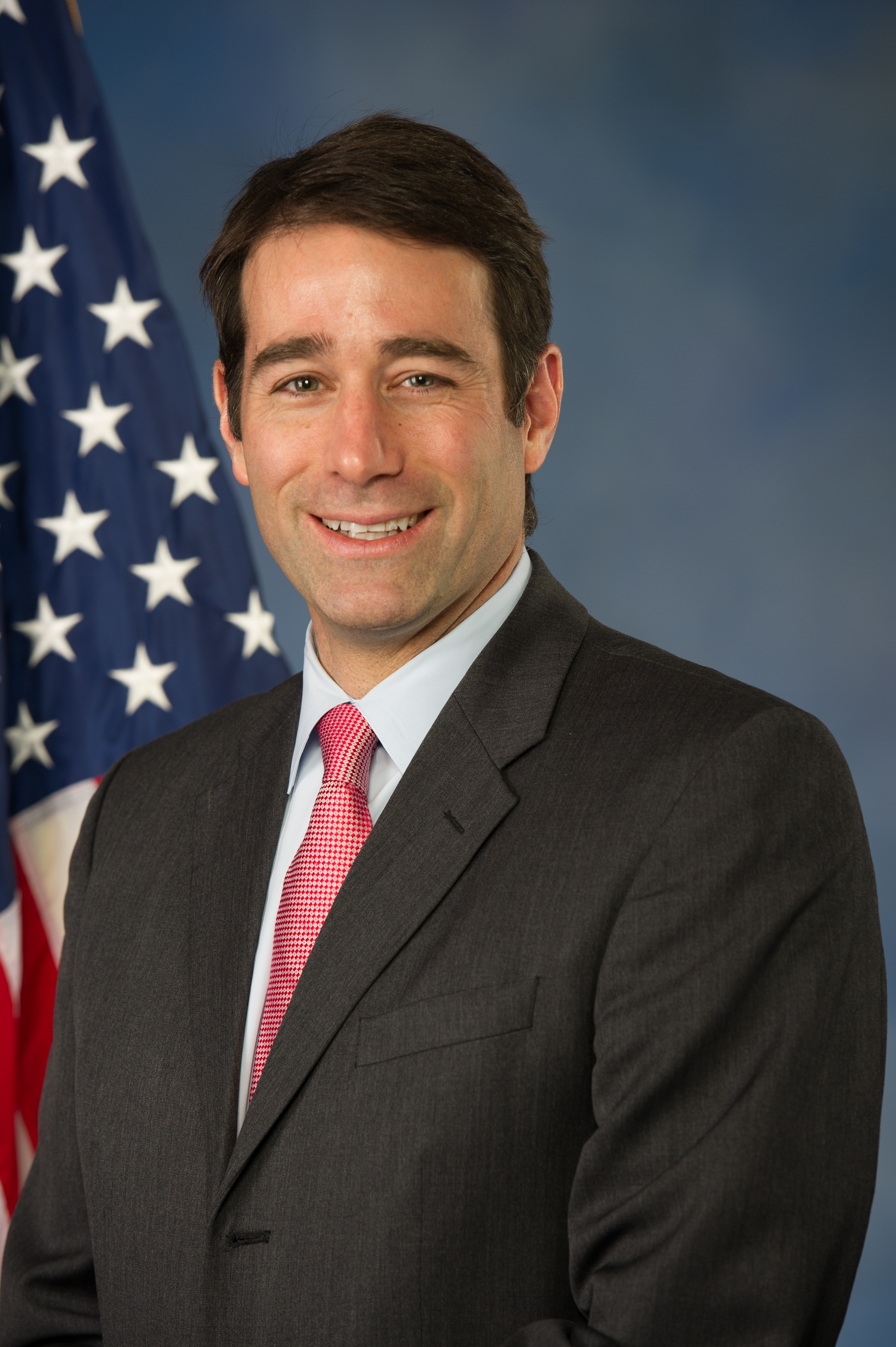
Garret Graves

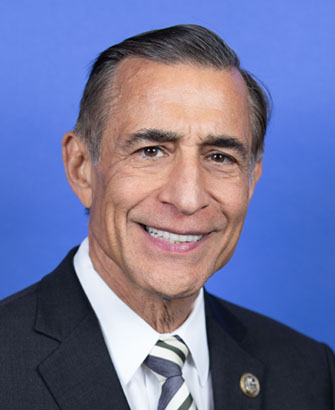
Darrell Issa

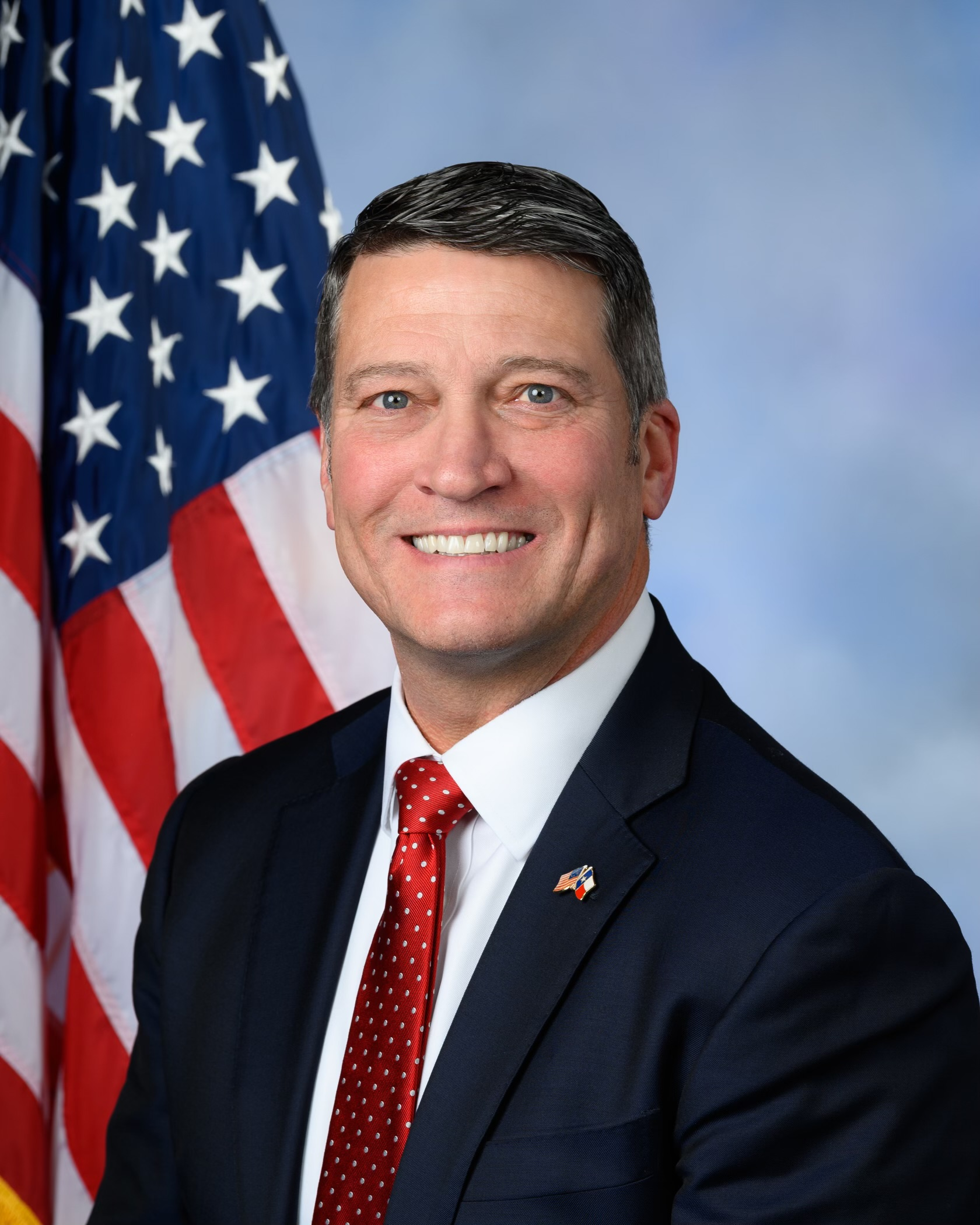
Ronny Jackson

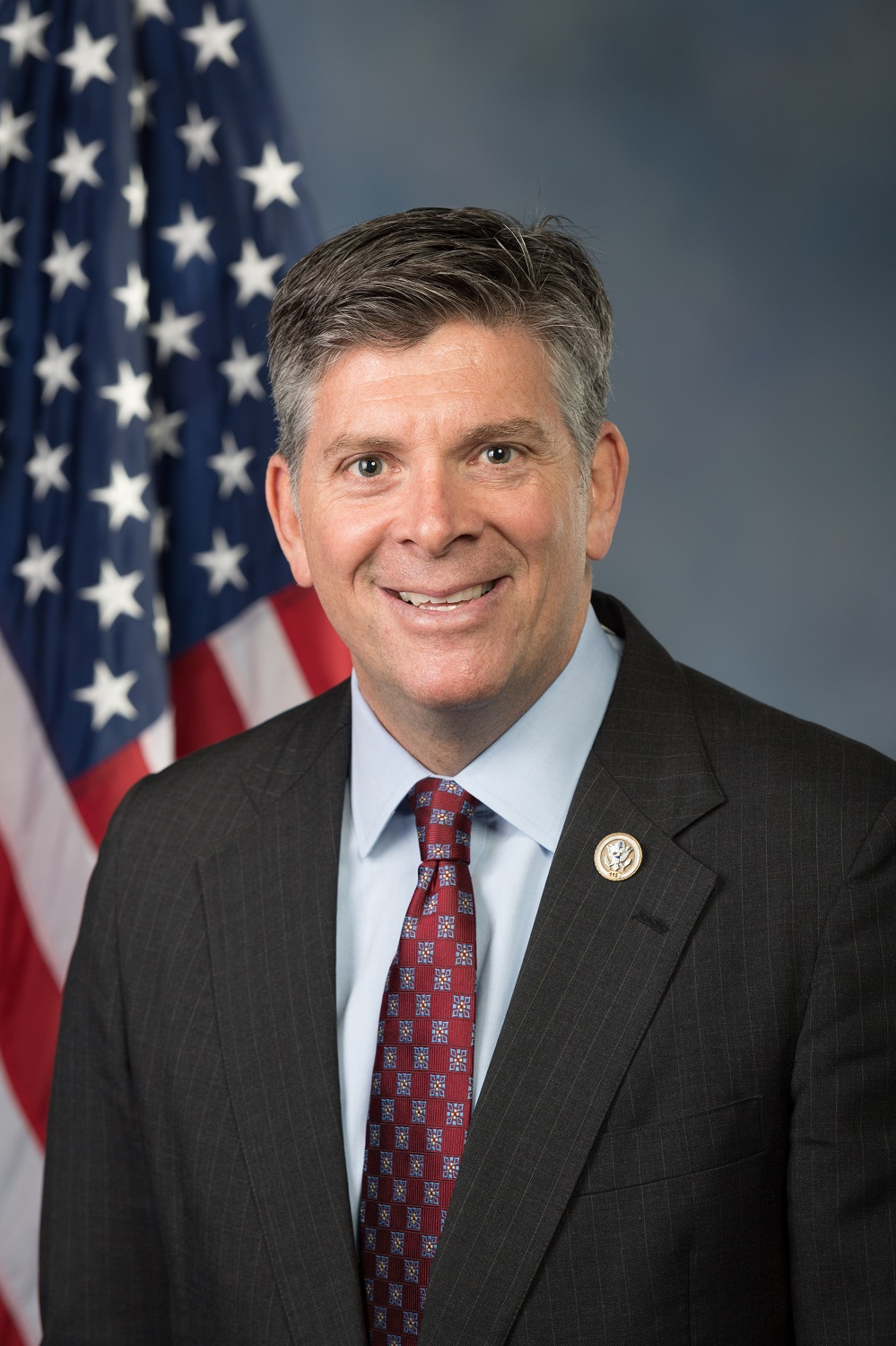
Darin LaHood

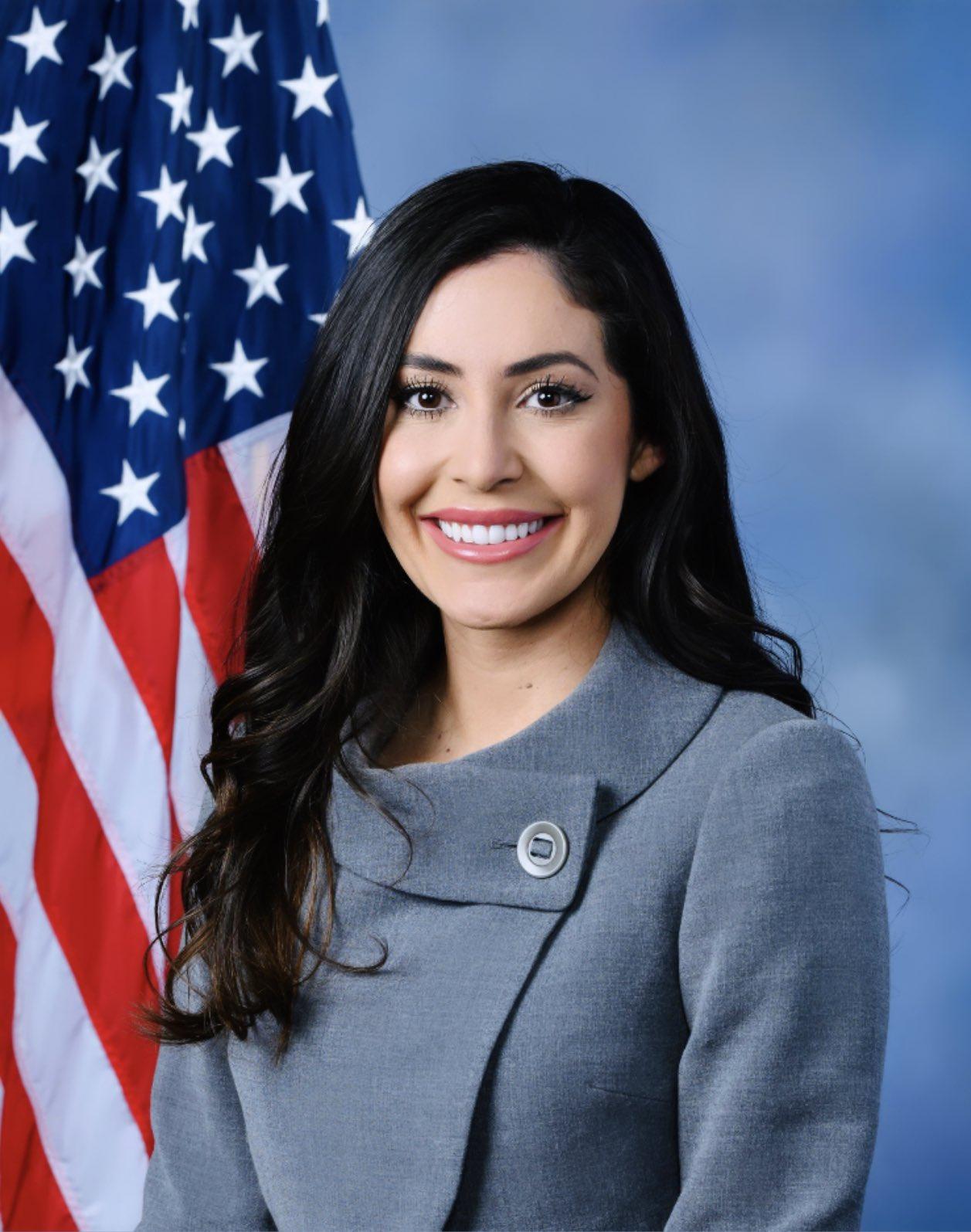
Anna Paulina Luna

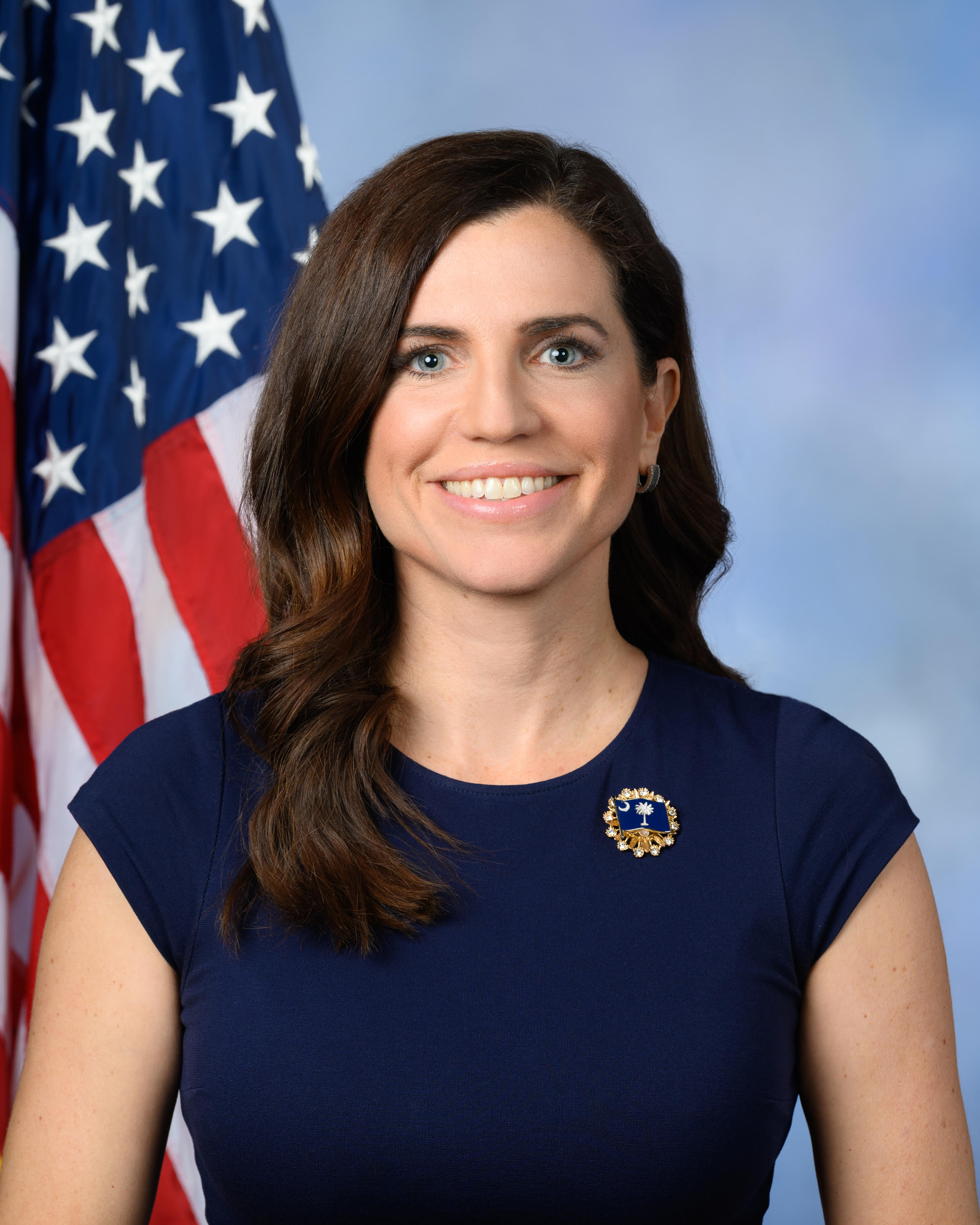
Nancy Mace

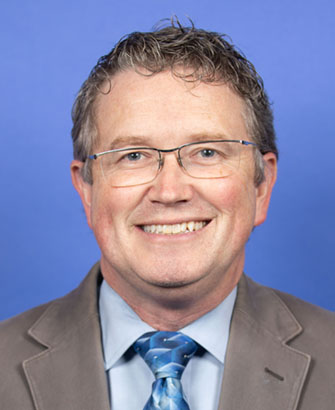
Thomas Massie

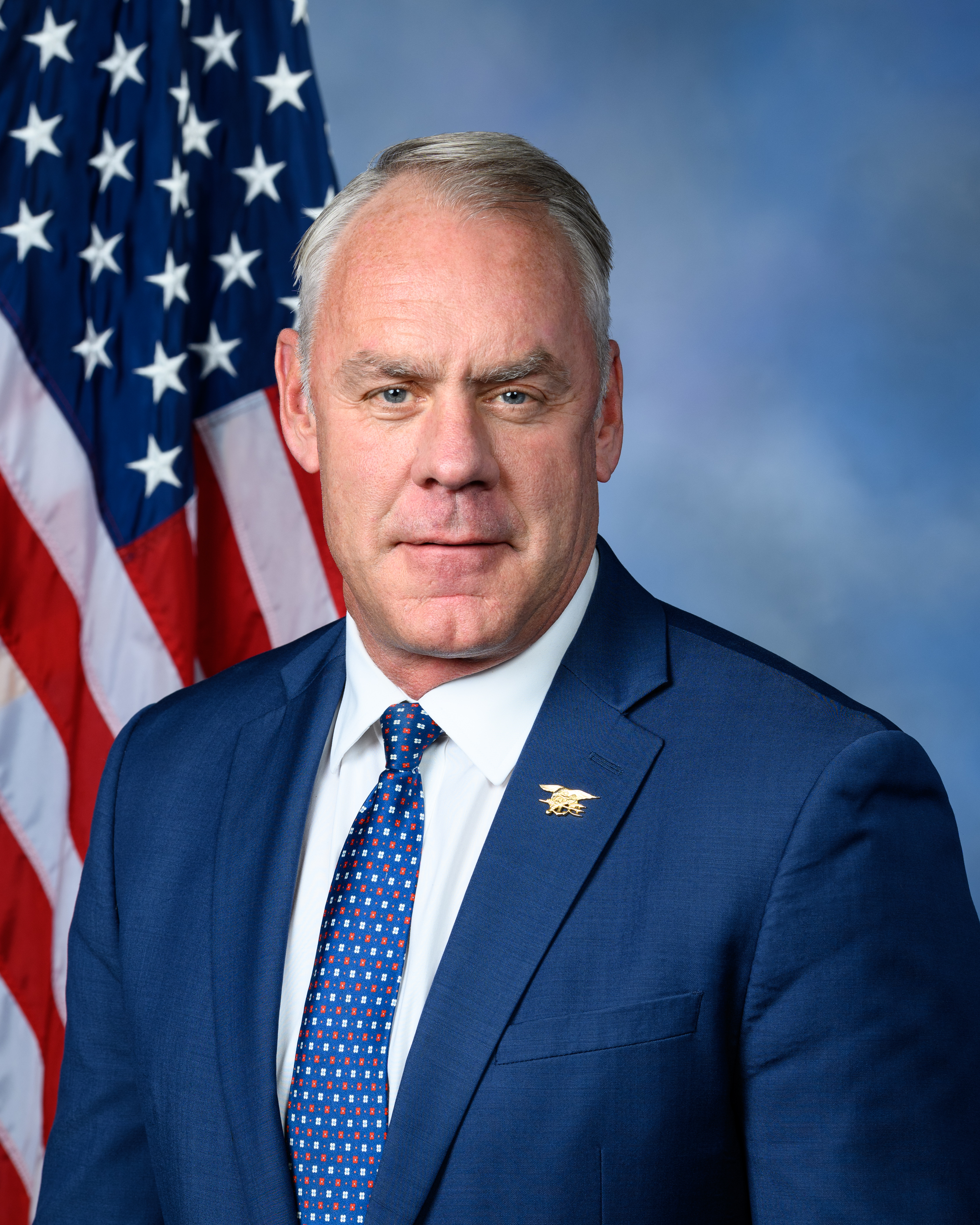
Ryan Zinke

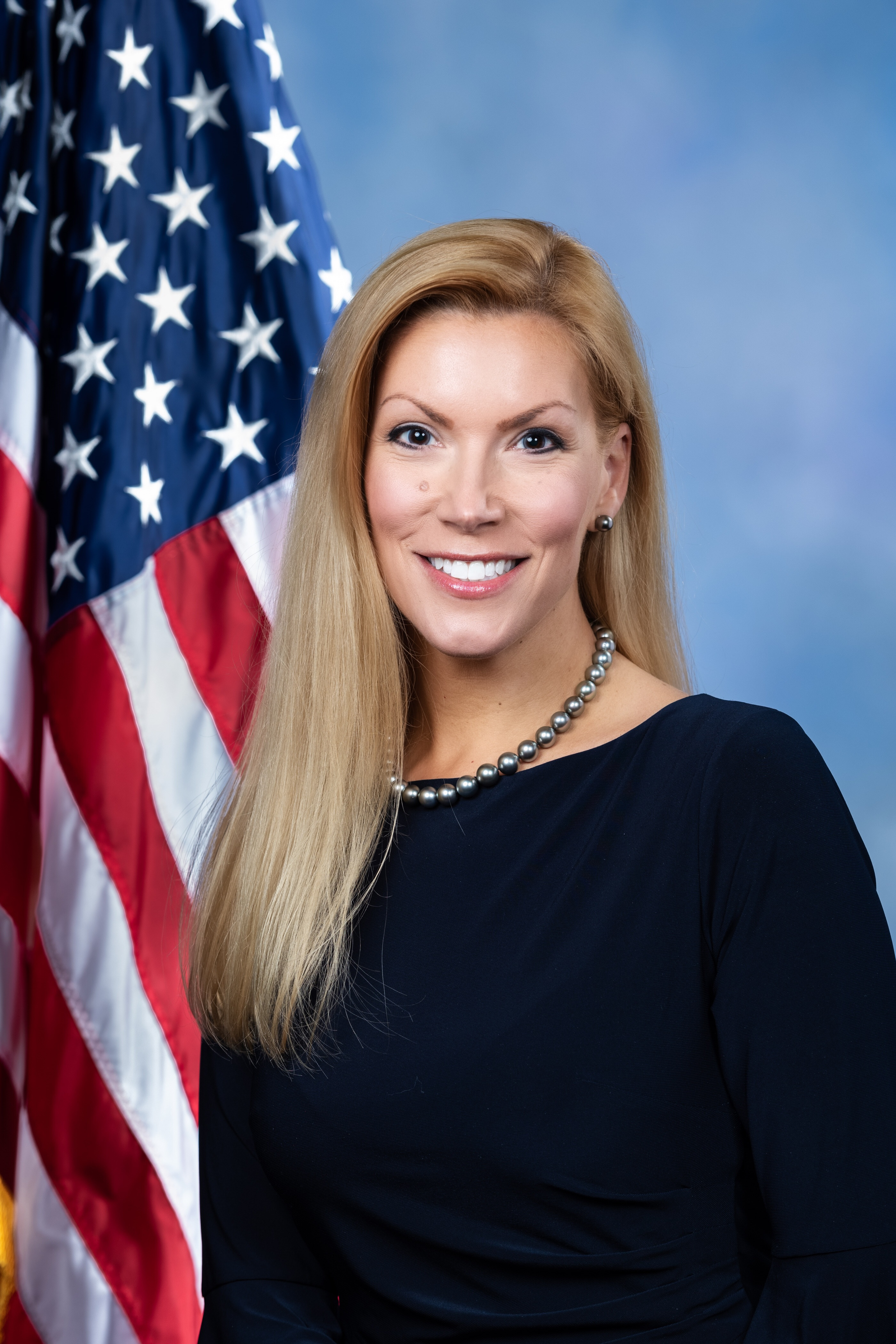
Beth Van Duyne

=== Current ===
As of October 2024, 203 out of the currently serving 220 Republican representatives endorsed Trump.

- Robert Aderholt, AL-04 (1997–present)
- Mark Alford, MO-04 (2023–present)
- Rick Allen, GA-12 (2015–present)
- Mark Amodei, NV-02 (2011–present)
- Kelly Armstrong, ND-AL (2019–2024), Republican nominee for Governor of North Dakota in 2024
- Jodey Arrington, TX-19 (2017–present)
- Brian Babin, TX-36 (2015–present)
- Don Bacon, NE-02 (2017–present)
- Jim Baird, IN-04 (2019–present)
- Troy Balderson, OH-12 (2018–present)
- Jim Banks, IN-03 (2017–2025), Republican nominee for U.S. Senate from Indiana in 2024
- Andy Barr, KY-06 (2013–present)
- Aaron Bean, FL-04 (2023–present)
- Cliff Bentz, OR-02 (2021–present)
- Jack Bergman, MI-01 (2017–present)
- Stephanie Bice, OK-05 (2021–present)
- Andy Biggs, AZ-05 (2017–present)
- Gus Bilirakis, FL-12 (2013–present), FL-09 (2007–2013)
- Dan Bishop, NC-08 (2023–2025), NC-09 (2019–2023), Republican nominee for Attorney General of North Carolina in 2024
- Lauren Boebert, CO-03 (2021–2025), Republican nominee for CO-04 in 2024
- Mike Bost, IL-12 (2015–present)
- Josh Brecheen, OK-02 (2023–present)
- Vern Buchanan, FL-16 (2013–present), FL-13 (2007–2013)
- Larry Bucshon, IN-08 (2011–2025)
- Michael Burgess, TX-26 (2003–2025)
- Eric Burlison, MO-07 (2023–present)
- Ken Calvert, CA-41 (2023–present), CA-42 (2013–2023), CA-44 (2003–2013), CA-43 (1993–2013)
- Kat Cammack, FL-03 (2021–present)
- Mike Carey, OH-15 (2021–present)
- Jerry Carl, AL-01 (2021–2025)
- Buddy Carter, GA-01 (2015–present)
- John Carter, TX-31 (2003–present)
- Lori Chavez-DeRemer, OR-05 (2023–2025)
- Juan Ciscomani, AZ-06 (2023–present)
- Ben Cline, VA-06 (2019–present)
- Andrew Clyde, GA-09 (2021–present)
- Tom Cole, OK-04 (2003–present)
- Mike Collins, GA-10 (2023–present)
- James Comer, KY-01 (2016–present)
- Eli Crane, AZ-02 (2023–present)
- Rick Crawford, AR-01 (2011–present)
- Dan Crenshaw, TX-02 (2019–present)
- John Curtis, UT-03 (2017–2025), Republican nominee for U.S. Senate from Utah in 2024
- Warren Davidson, OH-08 (2016–present)
- Monica De La Cruz, TX-15 (2023–present)
- Scott DesJarlais, TN-04 (2011–present)
- Anthony D'Esposito, NY-04 (2023–2025)
- Mario Díaz-Balart, FL-26 (2023–present), FL-25 (2013–2023, 2003–2011), FL-21 (2011–2013)
- Byron Donalds, FL-19 (2021–present)
- John Duarte, CA-13 (2023–2025)
- Jeff Duncan, SC-03 (2011–2025)
- Neal Dunn, FL-02 (2017–present)
- Chuck Edwards, NC-11 (2023–present)
- Jake Ellzey, TX-06 (2021–present)
- Tom Emmer, MN-06 (2015–present), House Majority Whip (2023–present)
- Ron Estes, KS-04 (2017–present)
- Mike Ezell, MS-04 (2023–present)
- Pat Fallon, TX-04 (2021–present)
- Randy Feenstra, IA-04 (2021–present)
- Brad Finstad, MN-01 (2022–present)
- Michelle Fischbach, MN-07 (2021–present)
- Scott Fitzgerald, WI-05 (2021–present)
- Chuck Fleischmann, TN-03 (2011–present)
- Mike Flood, NE-01 (2022–present)
- Vince Fong, CA-20 (2024–present)
- Virginia Foxx, NC-05 (2005–present)
- Scott Franklin, FL-18 (2023–present), FL-15 (2021–2023)
- Russell Fry, SC-07 (2023–present)
- Russ Fulcher, ID-01 (2019–present)
- Matt Gaetz, FL-01 (2017–2024)
- Andrew Garbarino, NY-02 (2021–present)
- Mike Garcia, CA-27 (2023–2025), CA-25 (2020–2023)
- Carlos Giménez, FL-28 (2023–present), FL-26 (2021–2023)
- Jenniffer González, U.S. Delegate from Puerto Rico (2017–2025)
- Tony Gonzales, TX-23 (2021–2026)
- Bob Good, VA-05 (2021–2025)
- Lance Gooden, TX-05 (2019–present)
- Paul Gosar, AZ-09 (2023–present), AZ-04 (2013–2023), AZ-01 (2011–2013)
- Garret Graves, LA-06 (2015–2025)
- Sam Graves, MO-06 (2001–present)
- Mark Green, TN-07 (2019–2025)
- Marjorie Taylor Greene, GA-14 (2021–2026)
- Morgan Griffith, VA-09 (2011–present)
- Glenn Grothman, WI-06 (2015–present)
- Michael Guest, MS-03 (2019–present)
- Brett Guthrie, KY-02 (2009–present)
- Harriet Hageman, WY-AL (2023–present)
- Andy Harris, MD-01 (2011–present)
- Diana Harshbarger, TN-01 (2021–present)
- Kevin Hern, OK-01 (2018–present)
- Clay Higgins, LA-03 (2017–present)
- French Hill, AR-02 (2015–present)
- Ashley Hinson, IA-02 (2023–present), IA-01 (2021–2023)
- Erin Houchin, IN-09 (2023–present)
- Richard Hudson, NC-09 (2023–present), NC-08 (2013–2023)
- Bill Huizenga, MI-04 (2023–present), MI-02 (2011–2023)
- Wesley Hunt, TX-38 (2023–present)
- Darrell Issa, CA-48 (2023–present, 2001–2003), CA-50 (2021–2023), CA-49 (2003–2019)
- Ronny Jackson, TX-13 (2021–present)
- John James, MI-10 (2023–present)
- Dusty Johnson, SD-AL (2019–present)
- Mike Johnson, LA-04 (2017–present), Speaker of the United States House of Representatives (2023–present)
- Jim Jordan, OH-04 (2007–present)
- John Joyce, PA-13 (2019–present)
- Thomas Kean Jr., NJ-07 (2023–present)
- Mike Kelly, PA-16 (2019–present), PA-03 (2011–2019)
- Trent Kelly, MS-01 (2015–present)
- Jen Kiggans, VA-02 (2023–present)
- Kevin Kiley, CA-03 (2023–present)
- David Kustoff, TN-08 (2017–present)
- Darin LaHood, IL-16 (2023–present), IL-18 (2015–2023)
- Nick LaLota, NY-01 (2023–present)
- Doug LaMalfa, CA-01 (2013–2026)
- Nick Langworthy, NY-23 (2023–present)
- Mike Lawler, NY-17 (2023–present)
- Laurel Lee, FL-15 (2023–present)
- Debbie Lesko, AZ-08 (2018–2025)
- Julia Letlow, LA-05 (2021–present)
- Greg Lopez, CO-04 (2024–2025)
- Barry Loudermilk, GA-11 (2015–present)
- Anna Paulina Luna, FL-13 (2023–present)
- Frank Lucas, OK-03 (2003–present), OK-06 (1994–2003)
- Nancy Mace, SC-01 (2021–present)
- Celeste Maloy, UT-02 (2023–present)
- Tracey Mann, KS-01 (2021–present)
- Nicole Malliotakis, NY-11 (2021–present)
- Thomas Massie, KY-4 (2012–present)
- Brian Mast, FL-21 (2023–present), FL-18 (2017–2023)
- Lisa McClain, MI-09 (2023–present), MI-10 (2021–2023)
- Rich McCormick, GA-06 (2023–present)
- Dan Meuser, PA-09 (2019–present)
- Carol Miller, WV-01 (2023–present), WV-03 (2019–2023)
- Mary Miller, IL-15 (2021–present)
- Max Miller, OH-07 (2023–present)
- Mariannette Miller-Meeks, IA-01 (2023–present), IA-02 (2021–2023)
- Cory Mills, FL-07 (2023–present)
- Marc Molinaro, NY-19 (2023–2025)
- John Moolenaar, MI-02 (2023–present), MI-04 (2015–2023)
- Alex Mooney, WV-02 (2015–2025), Republican candidate for U.S. Senate from West Virginia in 2024
- Barry Moore, AL-02 (2021–2025), Republican nominee for AL-01 in 2024
- Blake Moore, UT-01 (2021–present)
- Nathaniel Moran, TX-01 (2023–present)
- James Moylan, U.S. Delegate from GU-AL (2023–present)
- Troy Nehls, TX-22 (2021–present)
- Dan Newhouse, WA-04 (2015–present)
- Ralph Norman, SC-05 (2017–present)
- Zach Nunn, IA-03 (2023–present)
- Jay Obernolte, CA-23 (2023–present), CA-8 (2021–2023)
- Andy Ogles, TN-05 (2023–present)
- Burgess Owens, UT-04 (2021–present)
- Gary Palmer, AL-06 (2015–present)
- Scott Perry, PA-10 (2019–present)
- August Pfluger, TX-11 (2021–present)
- Bill Posey, FL-08 (2013–2025), FL-15 (2009–2013)
- Guy Reschenthaler, PA-14 (2019–present)
- Hal Rogers, KY-05 (1981–present), Dean of the United States House of Representatives (2022–present)
- Mike Rogers, AL-03 (2003–present)
- John Rose, TN-06 (2019–present)
- Matt Rosendale, MT-02 (2023–2025), MT-AL (2021–2023)
- David Rouzer, NC-07 (2015–present)
- Chip Roy, TX-21 (2019–present)
- Michael Rulli, OH-06 (2024–present)
- John Rutherford, FL-05 (2023–present), FL-04 (2017–2023)
- María Elvira Salazar, FL-27 (2021–present)
- Steve Scalise, LA-01 (2008–present), House Majority Leader (2023–present)
- David Schweikert, AZ-01 (2023–present), AZ-06 (2013–2023), AZ-05 (2011–2013)
- Austin Scott, GA-08 (2011–present)
- Keith Self, TX-03 (2023–present)
- Pete Sessions, TX-17 (2021–present), TX-32 (2003–2019), TX-05 (1997–2003)
- Mike Simpson, ID-02 (1999–present)
- Adrian Smith, NE-03 (2007–present)
- Chris Smith, NJ-04 (1981–present)
- Jason Smith, MO-08 (2013–present)
- Lloyd Smucker, PA-11 (2019–present), PA-16 (2017–2019)
- Victoria Spartz, IN-05 (2021–present)
- Pete Stauber, MN-08 (2019–present)
- Michelle Steel, CA-45 (2023–2025), CA-48 (2021–2023)
- Elise Stefanik, NY-21 (2015–present)
- Bryan Steil, WI-01 (2019–present)
- Greg Steube, FL-17 (2019–present)
- Dale Strong, AL-05 (2023–present)
- Claudia Tenney, NY-24 (2023–present), NY-22 (2021–2023, 2017–2019)
- Glenn Thompson, PA-15 (2019–present), PA-05 (2009–2019)
- Tom Tiffany, WI-07 (2020–present)
- William Timmons, SC-04 (2019–present)
- Mike Turner, OH-10 (2013–present), OH-03 (2003–2013)
- Jeff Van Drew, NJ-02 (2019–present)
- Beth Van Duyne, TX-24 (2021–present)
- Derrick Van Orden, WI-03 (2023–present)
- Ann Wagner, MO-02 (2013–present)
- Tim Walberg, MI-05 (2023–present), MI-07 (2007–2009, 2011–2023)
- Michael Waltz, FL-06 (2019–2025)
- Randy Weber, TX-14 (2013–present)
- Daniel Webster, FL-11 (2017–present), FL-10 (2013–2017), FL-08 (2011–2013)
- Brad Wenstrup, OH-02 (2013–2025)
- Bruce Westerman, AR-04 (2015–present)
- Brandon Williams, NY-22 (2023–2025)
- Roger Williams, TX-25 (2013–present)
- Joe Wilson, SC-02 (2001–present)
- Rob Wittman, VA-01 (2007–present)
- Steve Womack, AR-03 (2011–present)
- Rudy Yakym, IN-02 (2022–present)
- Ryan Zinke, MT-01 (2023–present), MT-AL (2015–2017), U.S. Secretary of the Interior (2017–2019)

== Statewide officials ==
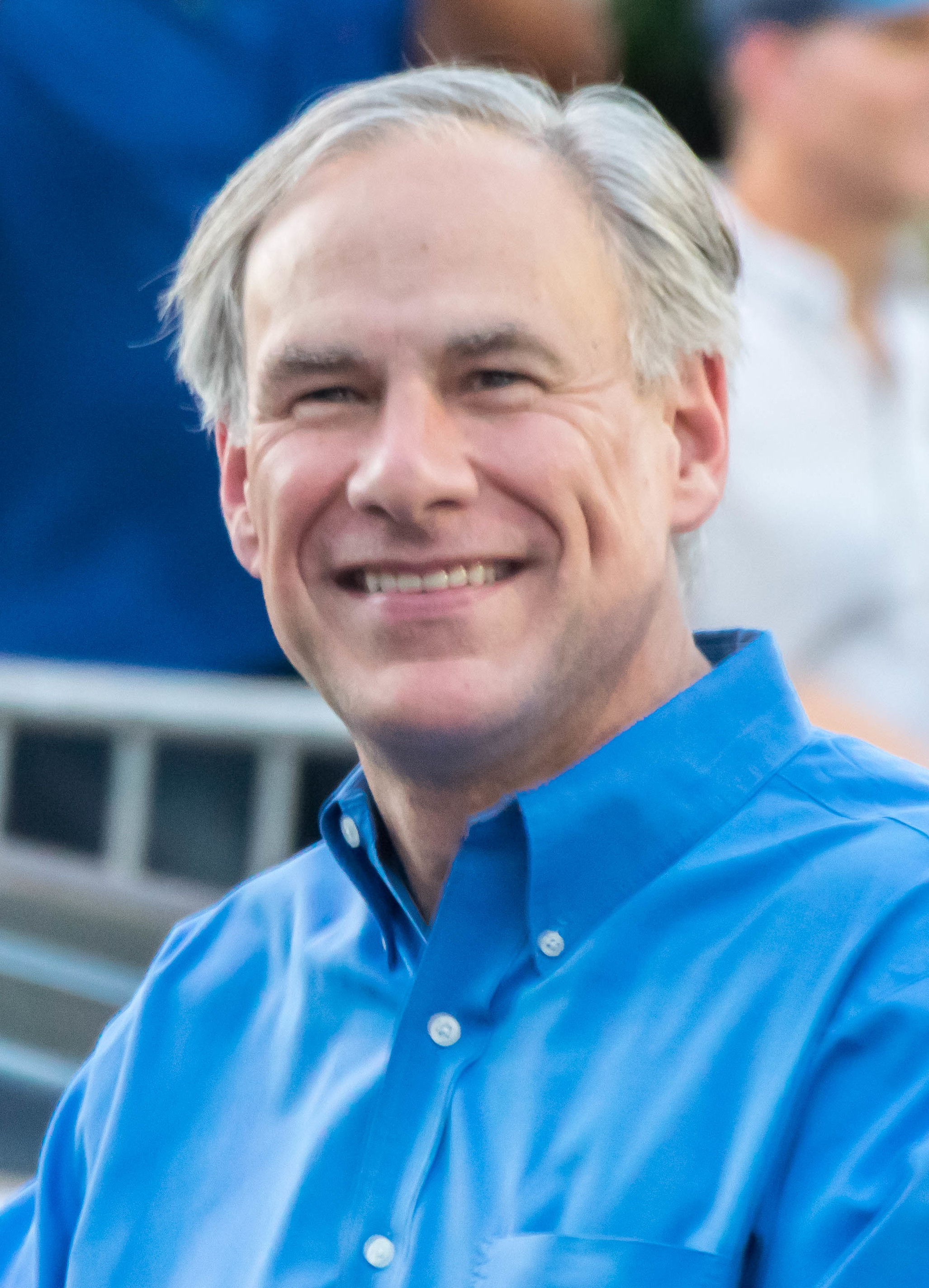
Greg Abbott

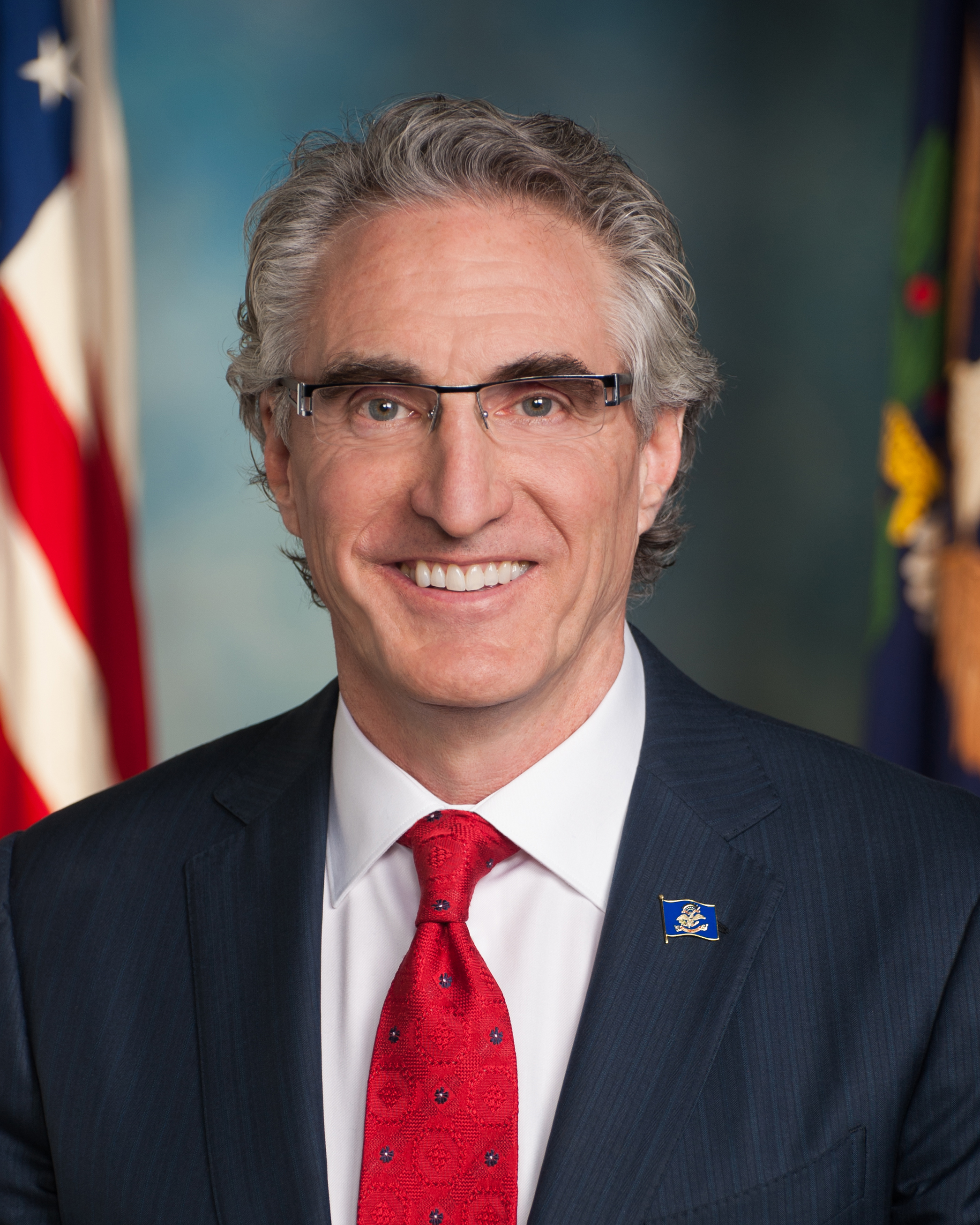
Doug Burgum

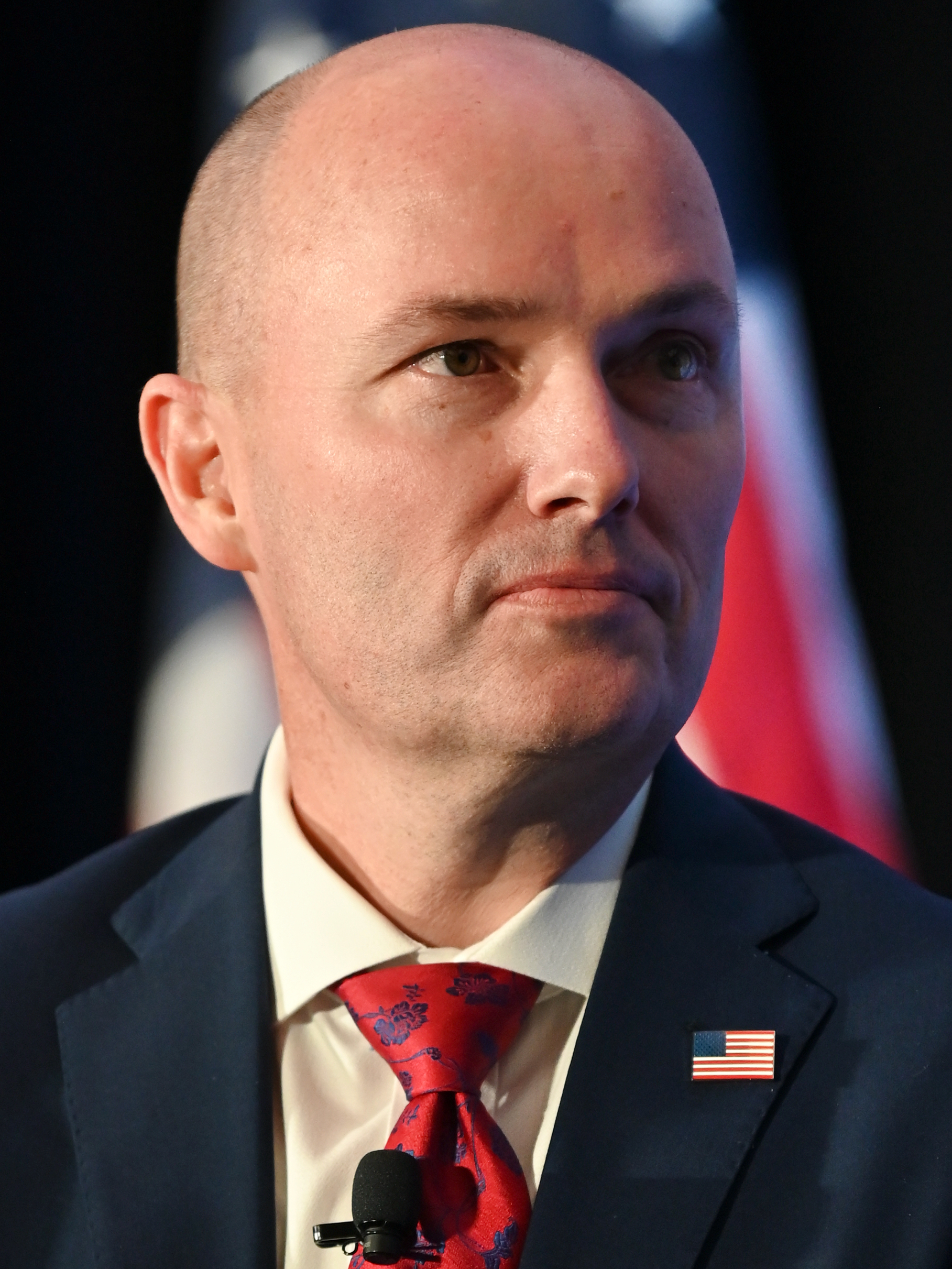
Spencer Cox

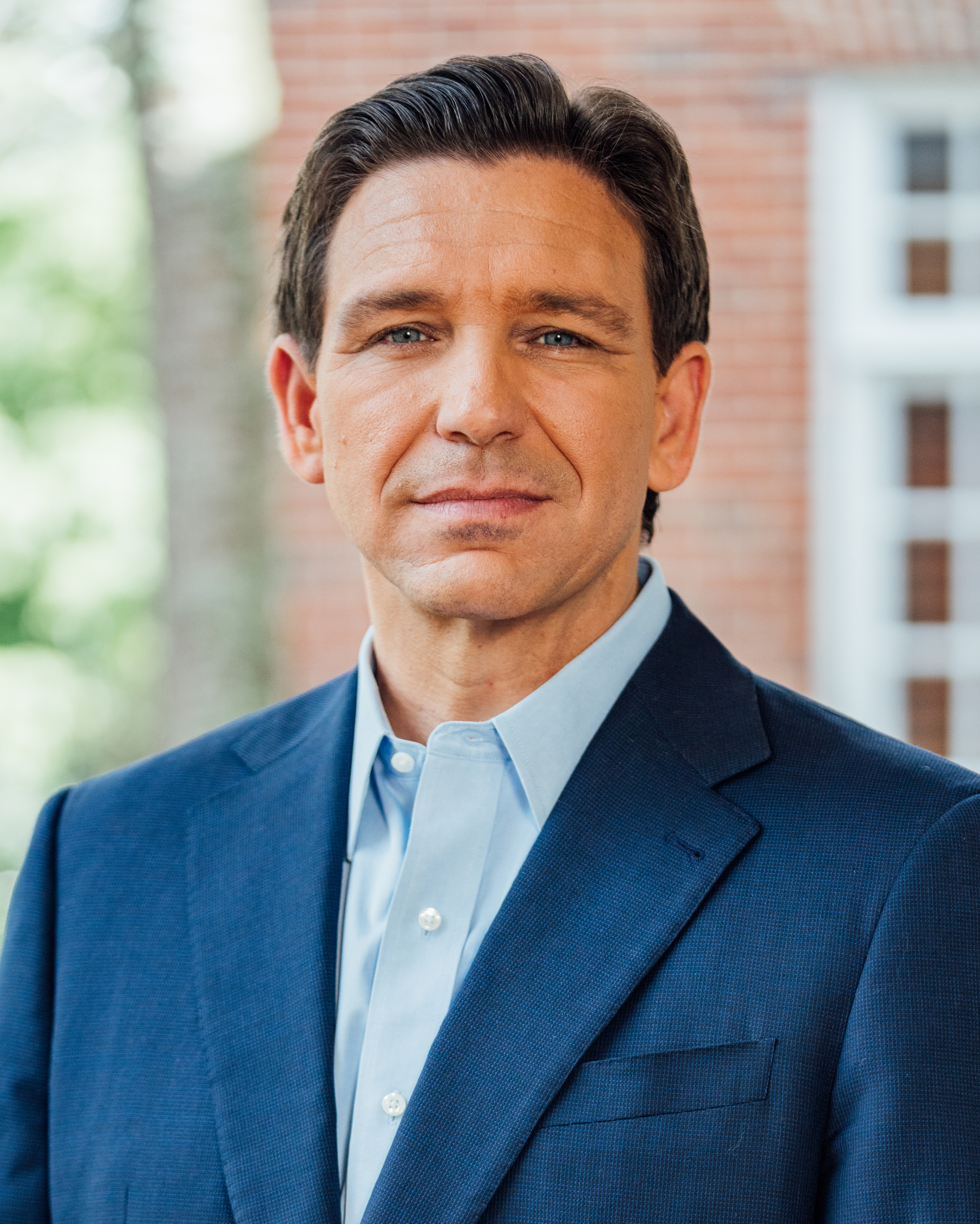
Ron DeSantis

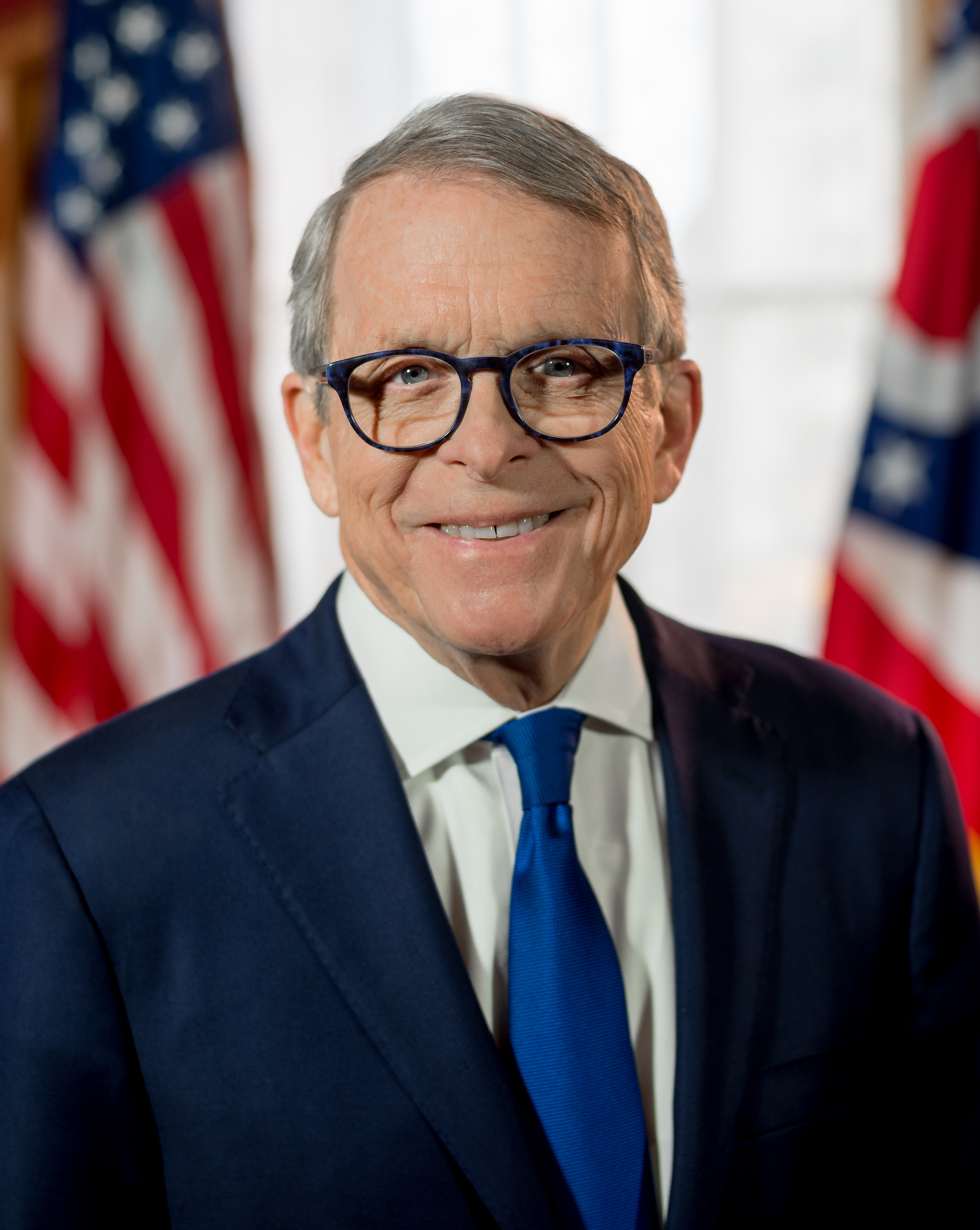
Mike DeWine

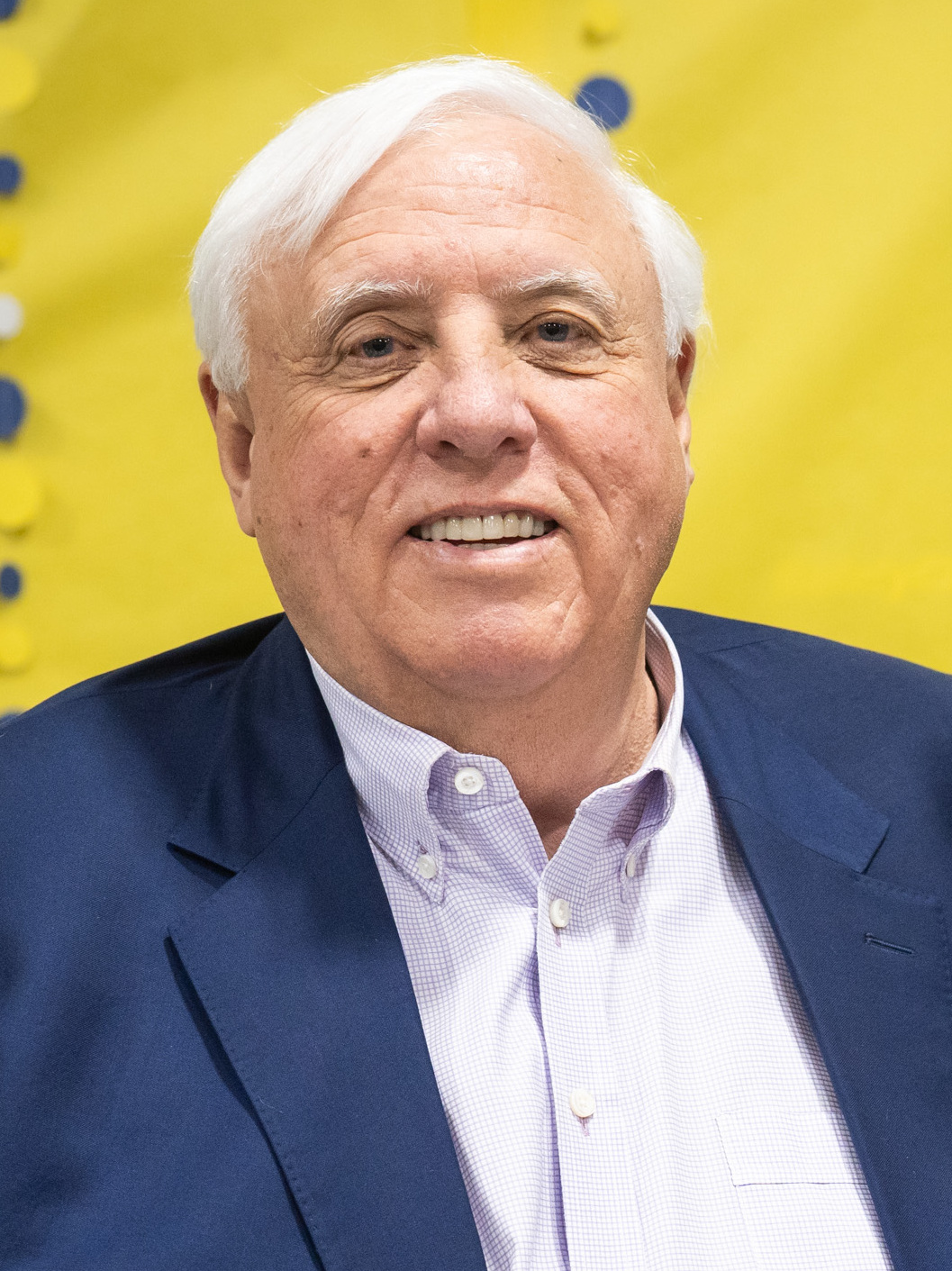
Jim Justice

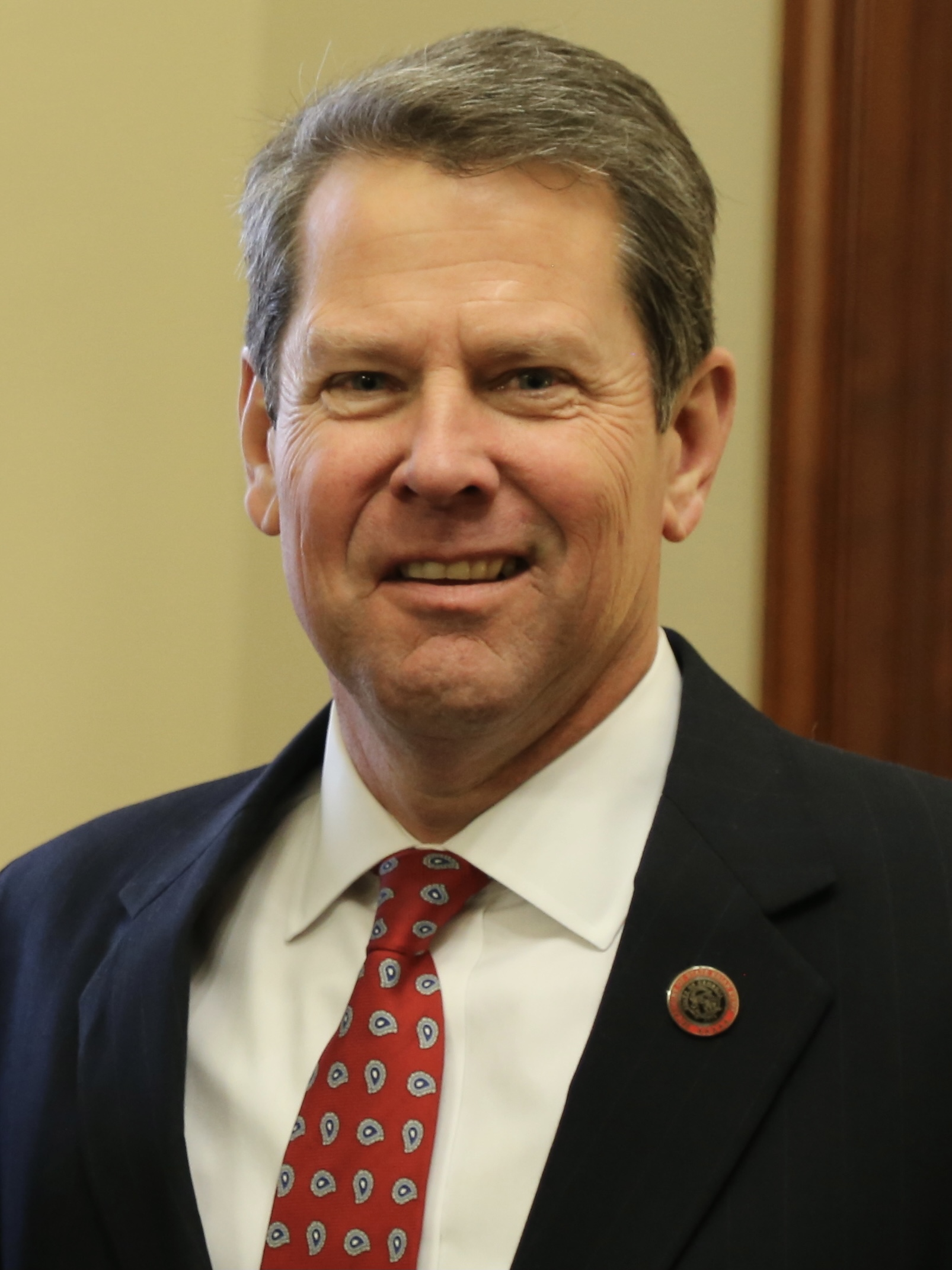
Brian Kemp

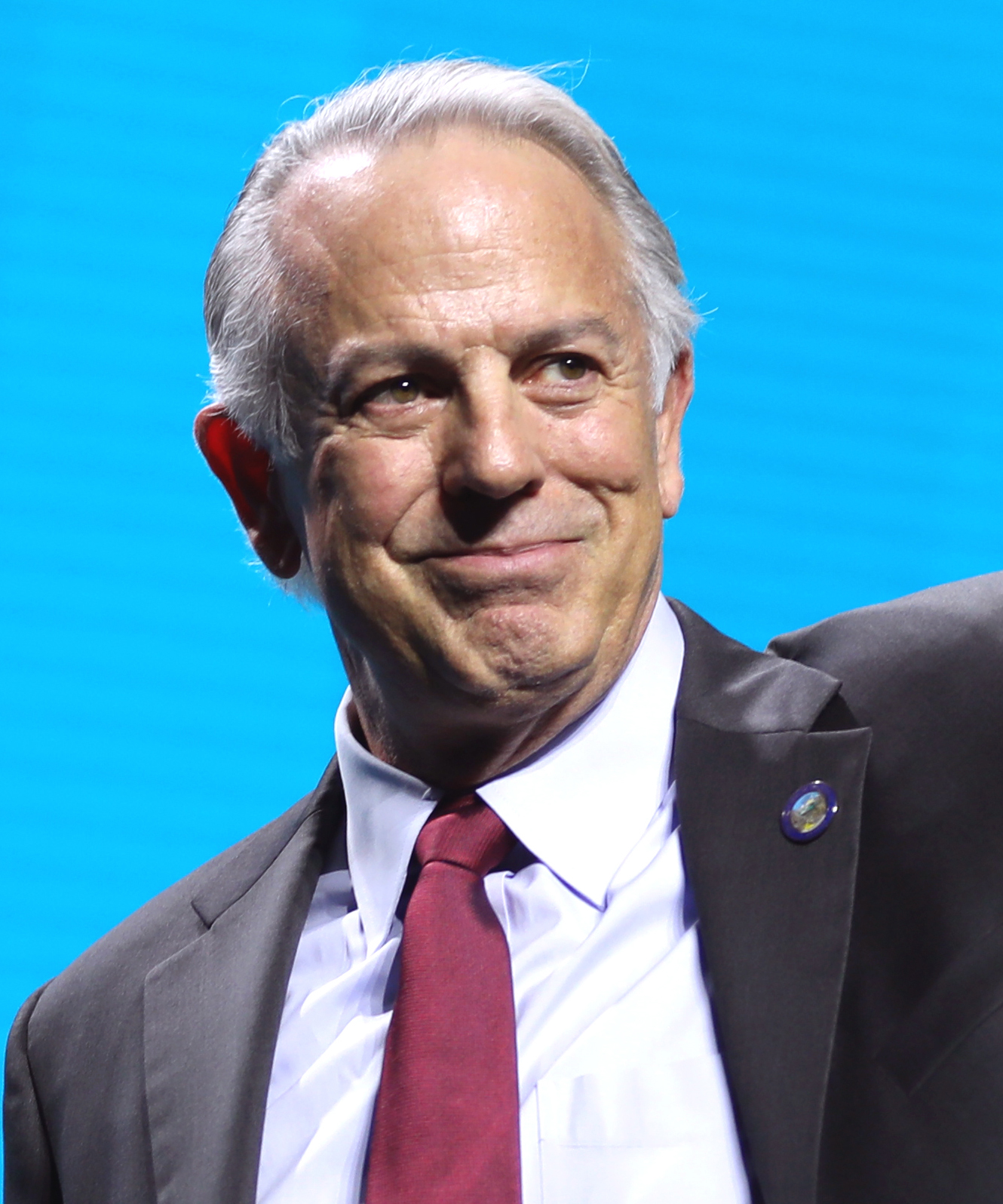
Joe Lombardo

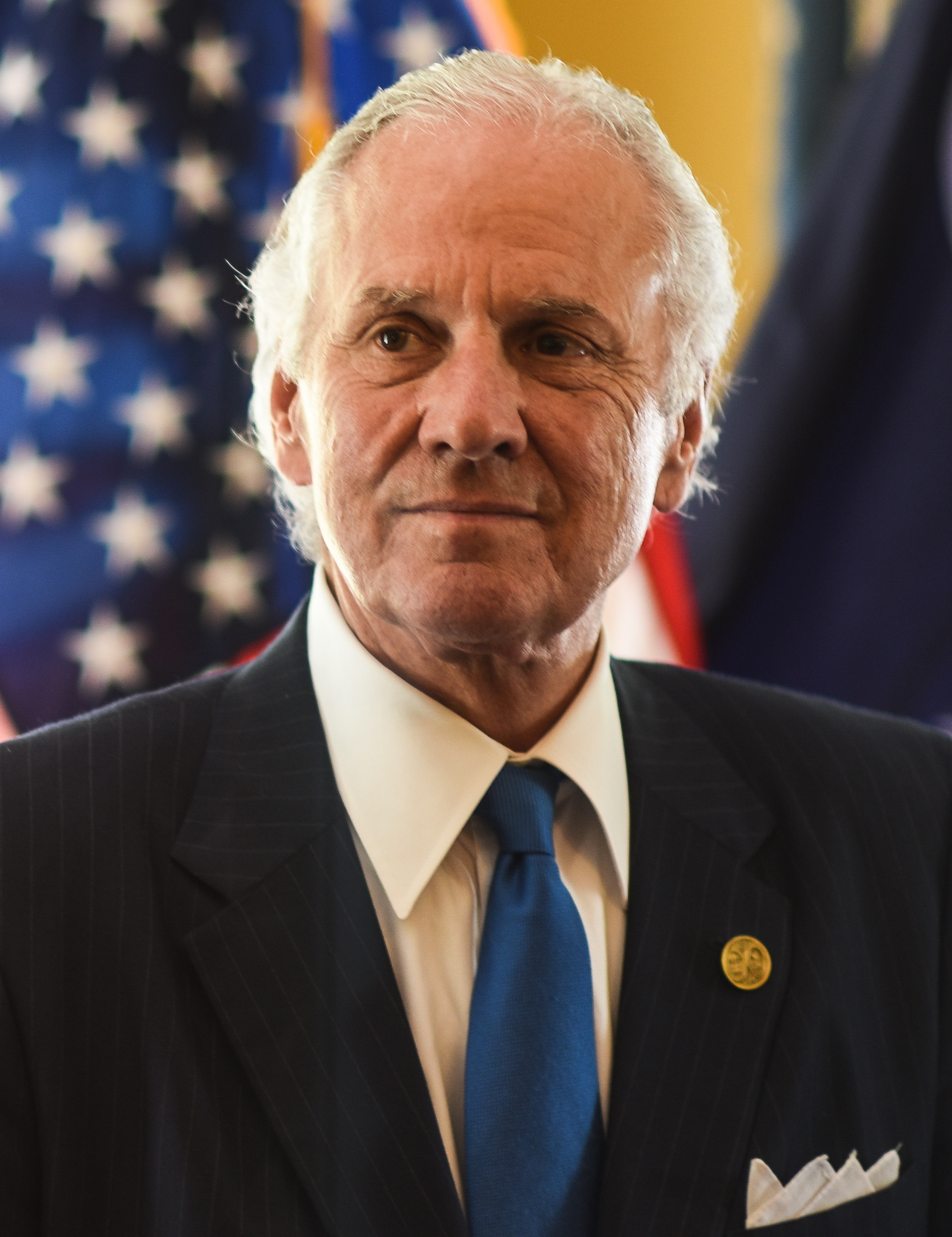
Henry McMaster

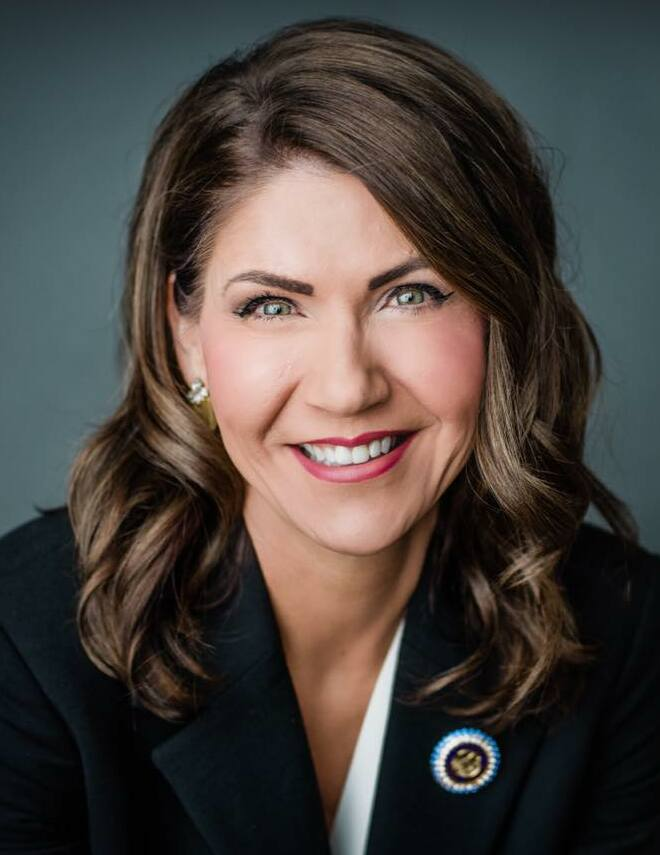
Kristi Noem

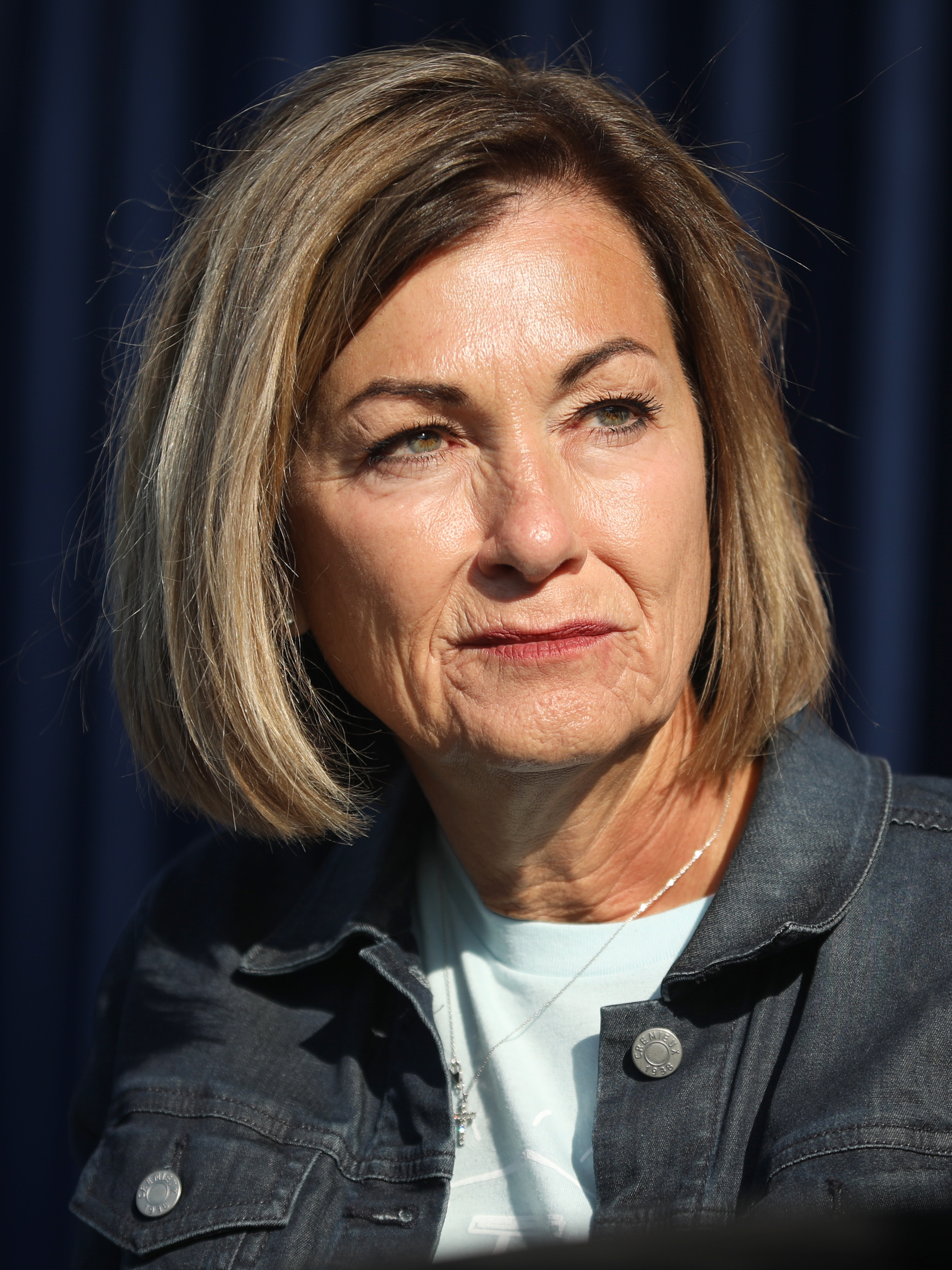
Kim Reynolds

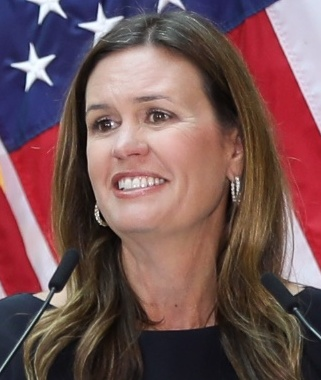
Sarah Huckabee Sanders

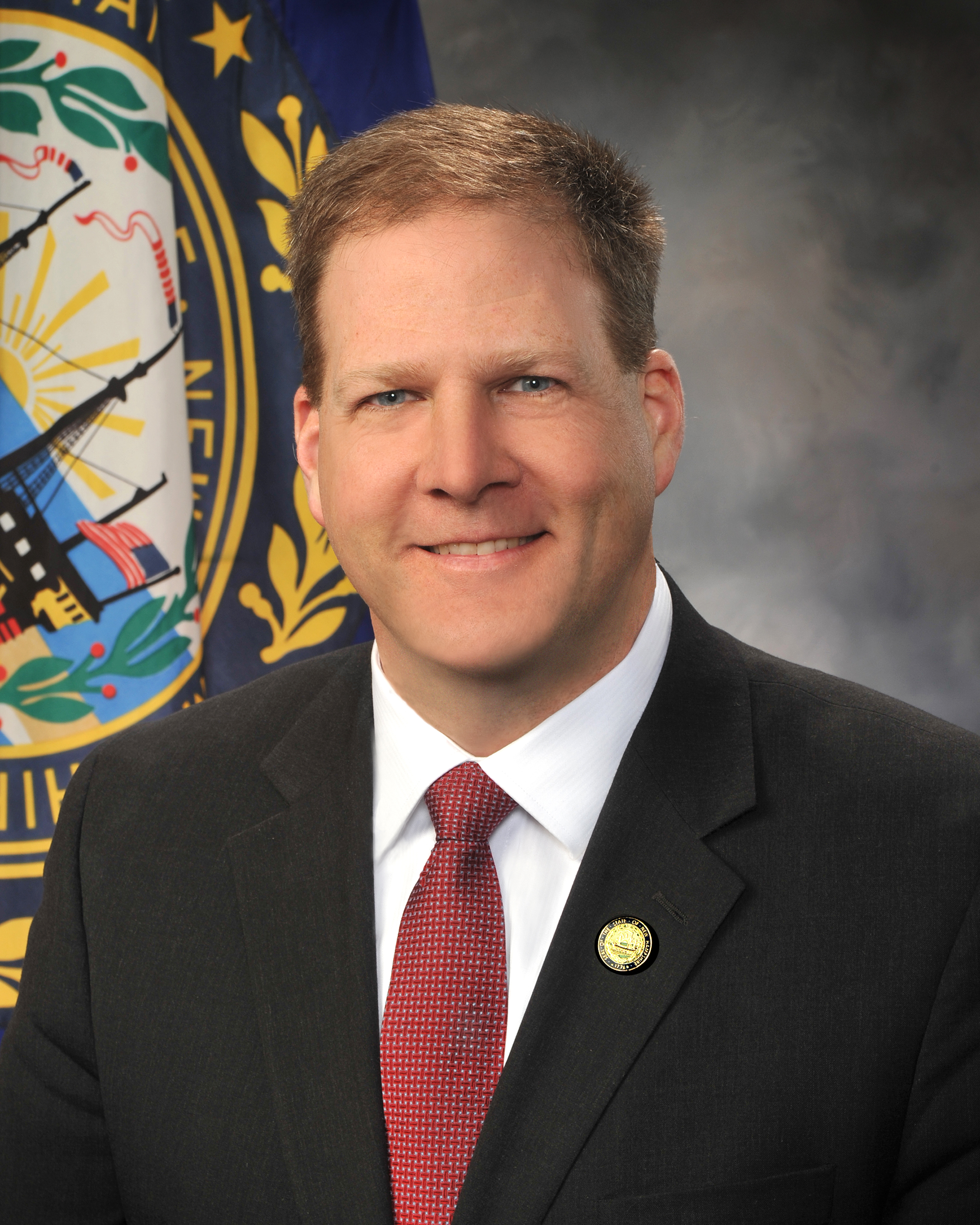
Chris Sununu

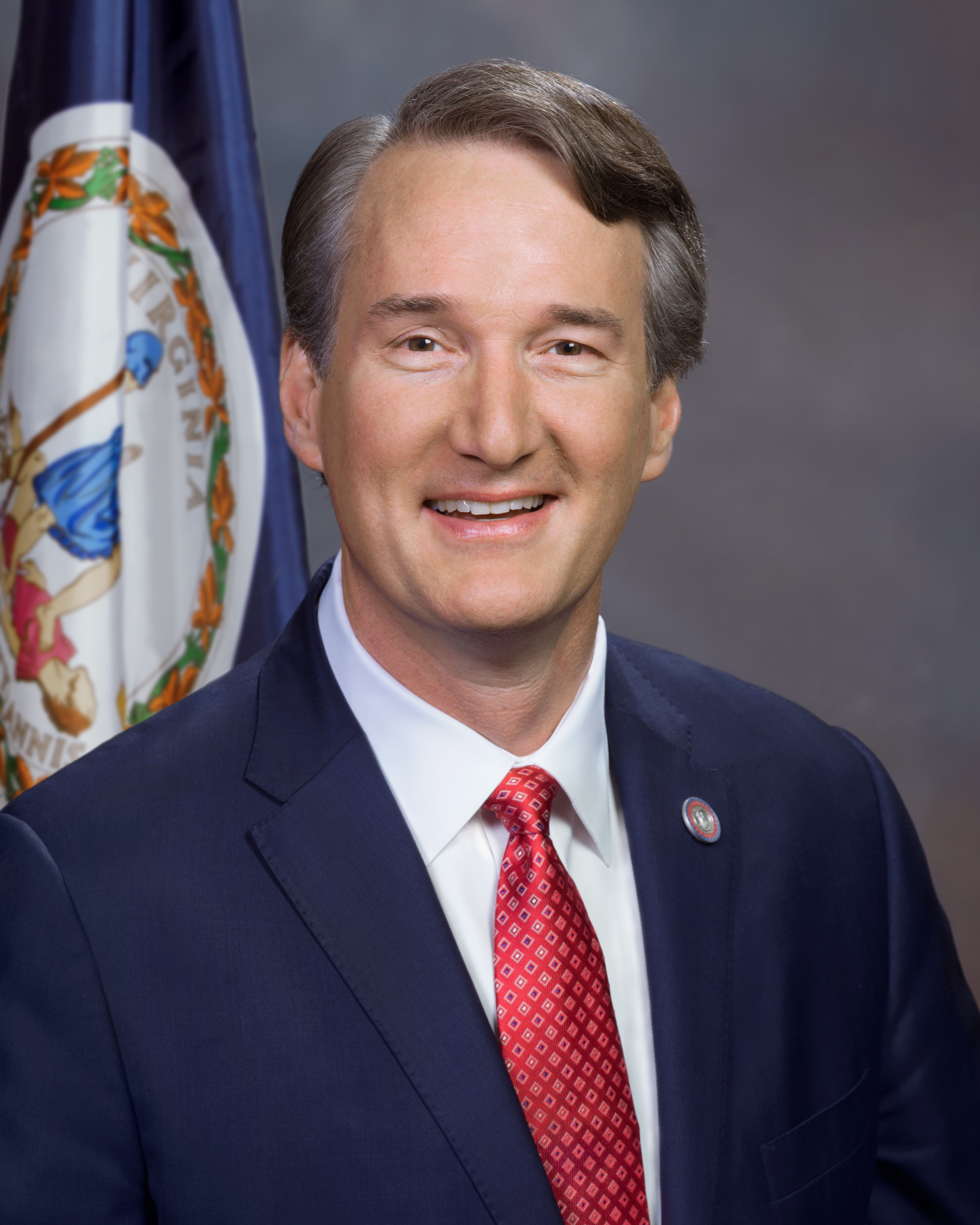
Glenn Youngkin

=== Governors ===
25 of the 27 incumbent Republican state governors endorsed Trump.

- Greg Abbott, Governor of Texas (2015–present)
- Doug Burgum, Governor of North Dakota (2016–2024) and former 2024 Republican presidential candidate
- Spencer Cox, Governor of Utah (2021–present)
- Ron DeSantis, Governor of Florida (2019–present) and former 2024 Republican presidential candidate
- Mike DeWine, Governor of Ohio (2019–present)
- Mike Dunleavy, Governor of Alaska (2018–present)
- Greg Gianforte, Governor of Montana (2021–present)
- Mark Gordon, Governor of Wyoming (2019–present)
- Sarah Huckabee Sanders, Governor of Arkansas (2023–present) and White House Press Secretary (2017–2019)
- Kay Ivey, Governor of Alabama (2017–present)
- Jim Justice, Governor of West Virginia (2017–2025) and Republican nominee for U.S. Senate from West Virginia in 2024
- Brian Kemp, Governor of Georgia (2019–present)
- Jeff Landry, Governor of Louisiana (2024–present)
- Bill Lee, Governor of Tennessee (2019–present)
- Brad Little, Governor of Idaho (2019–present)
- Joe Lombardo, Governor of Nevada (2023–present)
- Henry McMaster, Governor of South Carolina (2017–present)
- Kristi Noem, Governor of South Dakota (2019–2025) and U.S. Representative from SD-AL (2011–2019)
- Mike Parson, Governor of Missouri (2018–2025)
- Jim Pillen, Governor of Nebraska (2023–present)
- Tate Reeves, Governor of Mississippi (2020–present)
- Kim Reynolds, Governor of Iowa (2017–present)
- Kevin Stitt, Governor of Oklahoma (2019–present)
- Chris Sununu, Governor of New Hampshire (2017–2025)
- Glenn Youngkin, Governor of Virginia (2022–2026)

=== Lieutenant governors ===
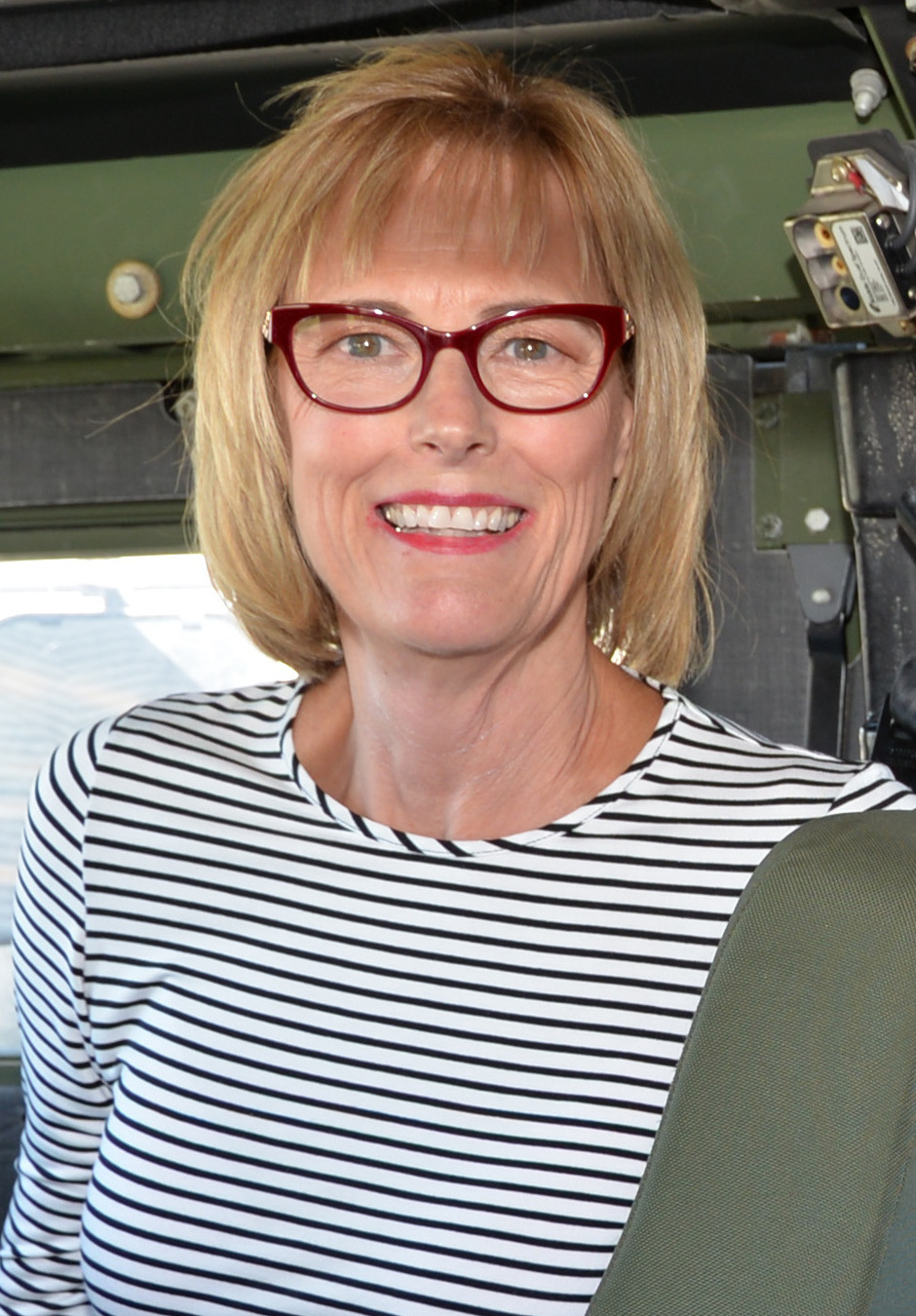
Suzanne Crouch

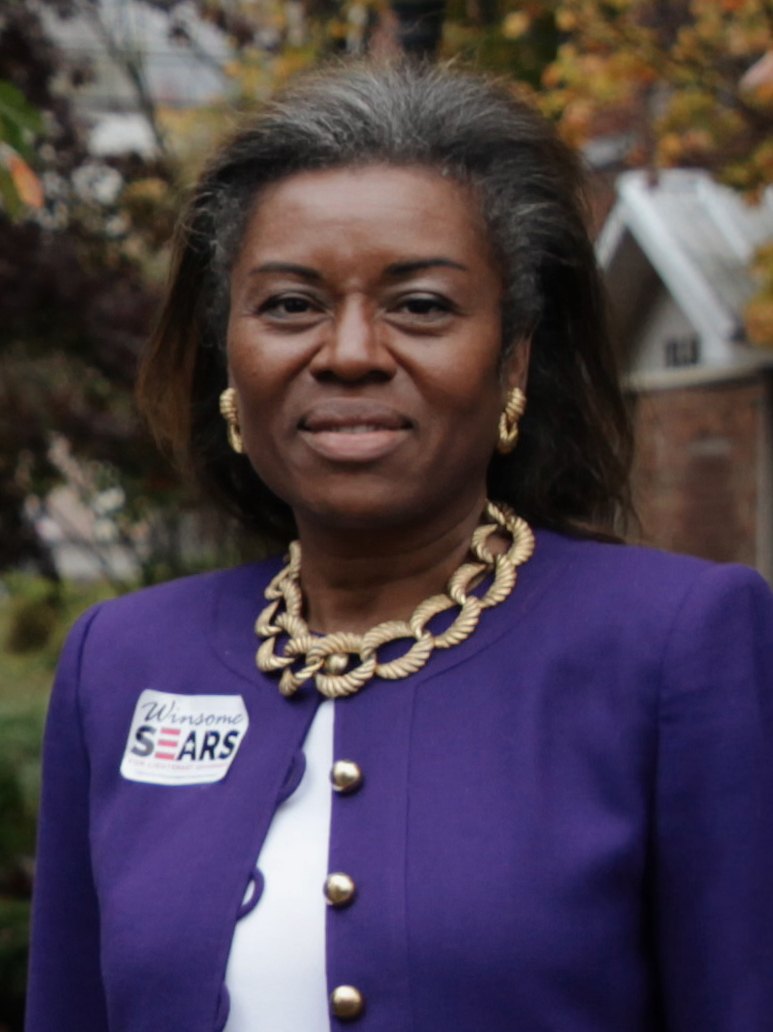
Winsome Earle-Sears

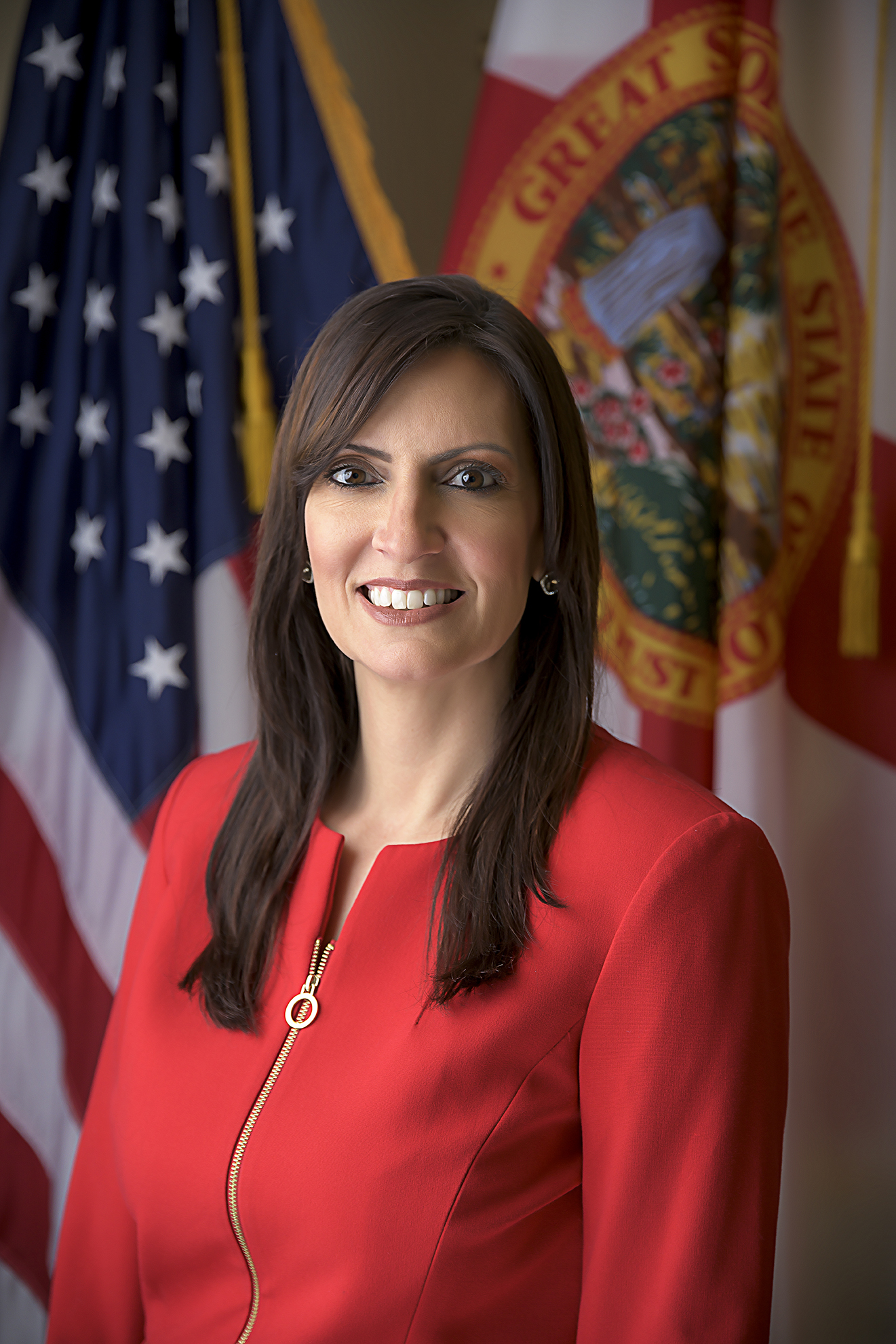
Jeanette Nuñez

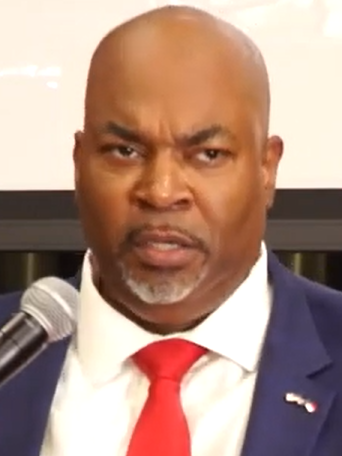
Mark Robinson

- Will Ainsworth, Lieutenant Governor of Alabama (2019–present)
- Stavros Anthony, Lieutenant Governor of Nevada (2023–present)
- Suzanne Crouch, Lieutenant Governor of Indiana (2017–2025)
- Nancy Dahlstrom, Lieutenant Governor of Alaska (2023–present) and former Republican candidate for U.S. Representative from AK-AL in 2024
- Pamela Evette, Lieutenant Governor of South Carolina (2019–present)
- Delbert Hosemann, Lieutenant Governor of Mississippi (2020–present)
- Jon Husted, Lieutenant Governor of Ohio (2019–2025)
- Burt Jones, Lieutenant Governor of Georgia (2023–present)
- Mike Kehoe, Lieutenant Governor of Missouri (2018–2025) and Republican nominee for Governor of Missouri in 2024
- Tammy Miller, Lieutenant Governor of North Dakota (2023–2024) and former Republican candidate for Governor of North Dakota in 2024
- Jeanette Nuñez, Lieutenant Governor of Florida (2019–2025)
- Dan Patrick, Lieutenant Governor of Texas (2015–present)
- Larry Rhoden, Lieutenant Governor of South Dakota (2019–2025)
- Mark Robinson, Lieutenant Governor of North Carolina (2021–2025) and Republican nominee for Governor of North Carolina in 2024
- Leslie Rutledge, Lieutenant Governor of Arkansas (2023–present)
- Winsome Sears, Lieutenant Governor of Virginia (2022–2026) and Republican candidate for Governor of Virginia in 2025

=== Attorneys general ===
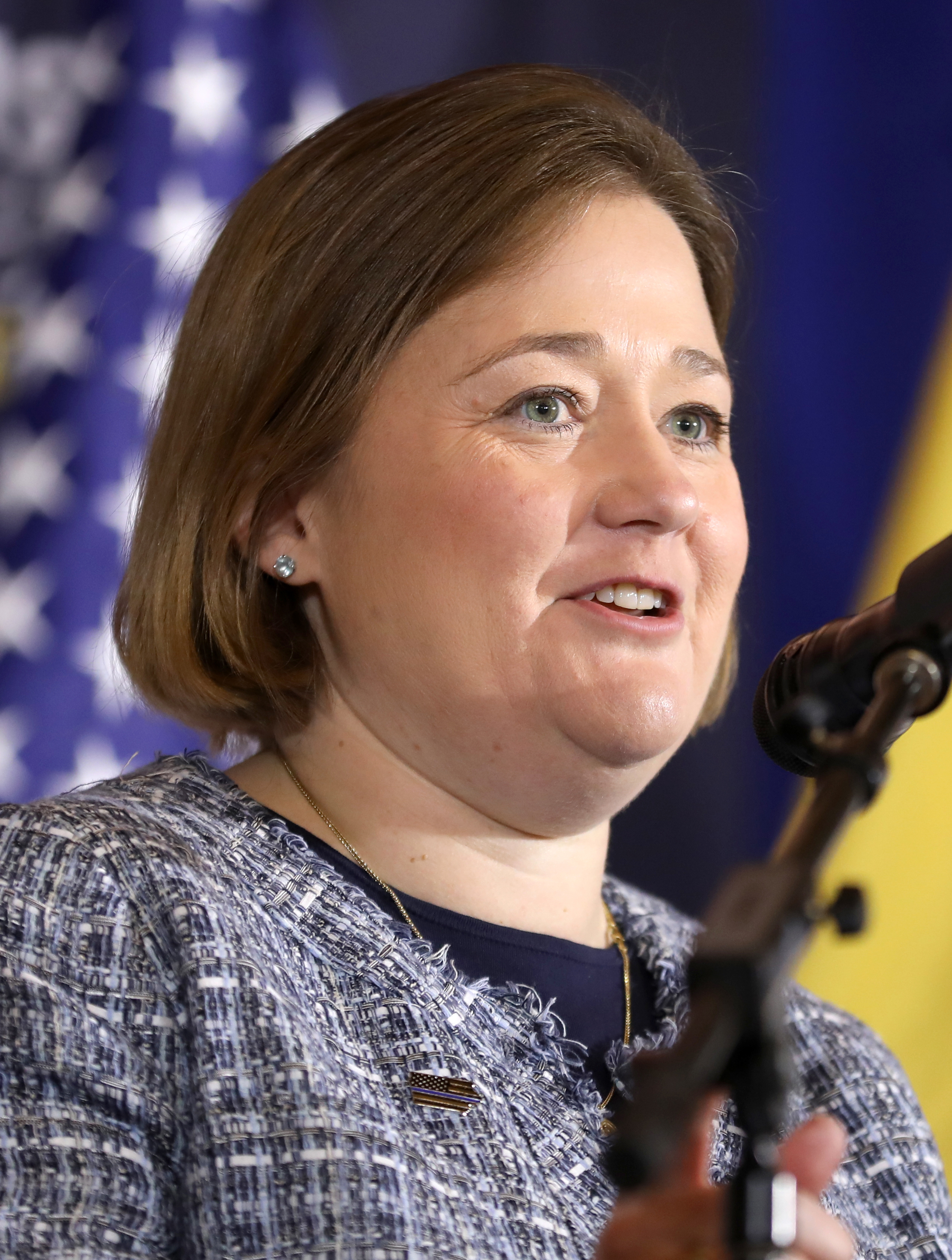
Brenna Bird

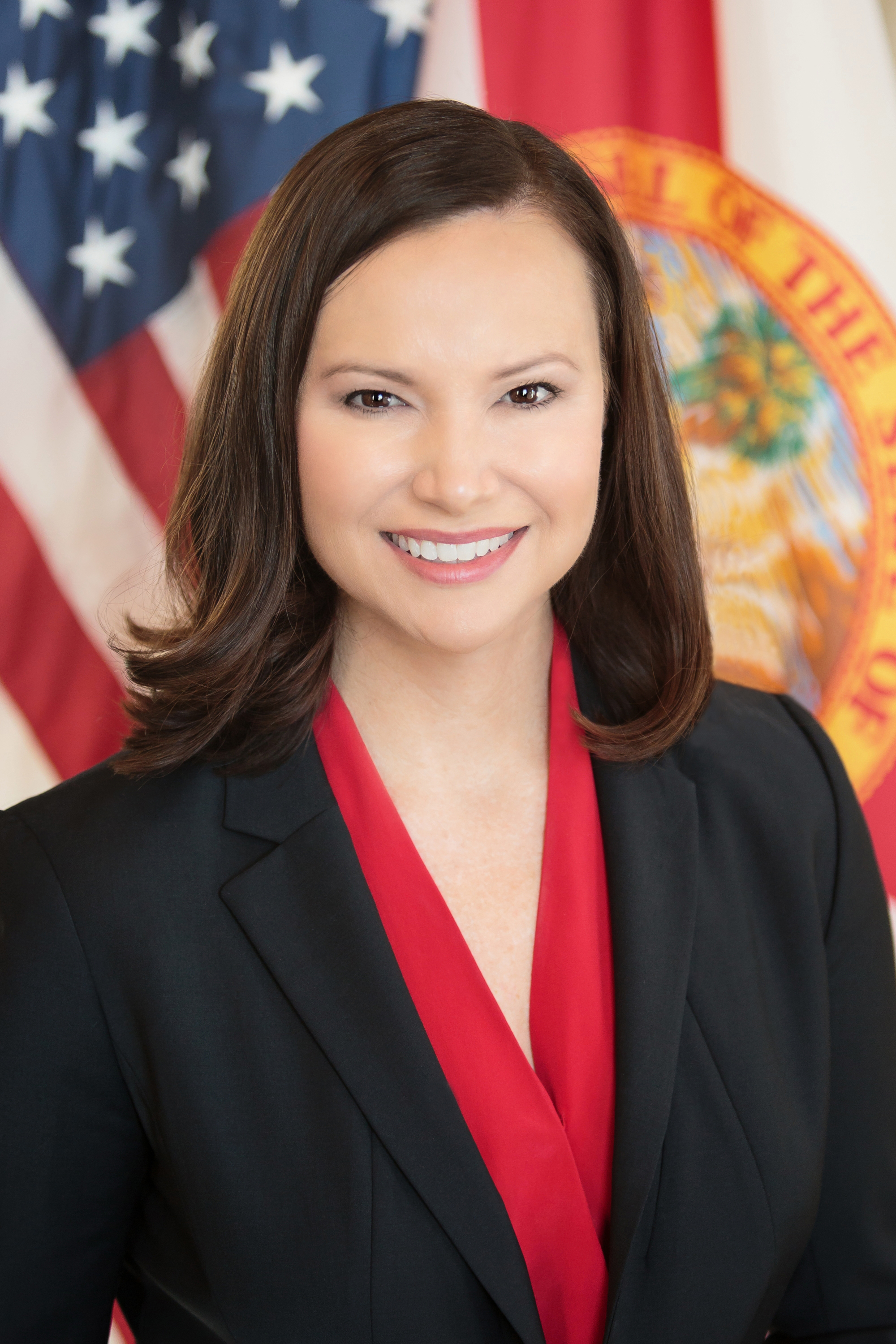
Ashley Moody

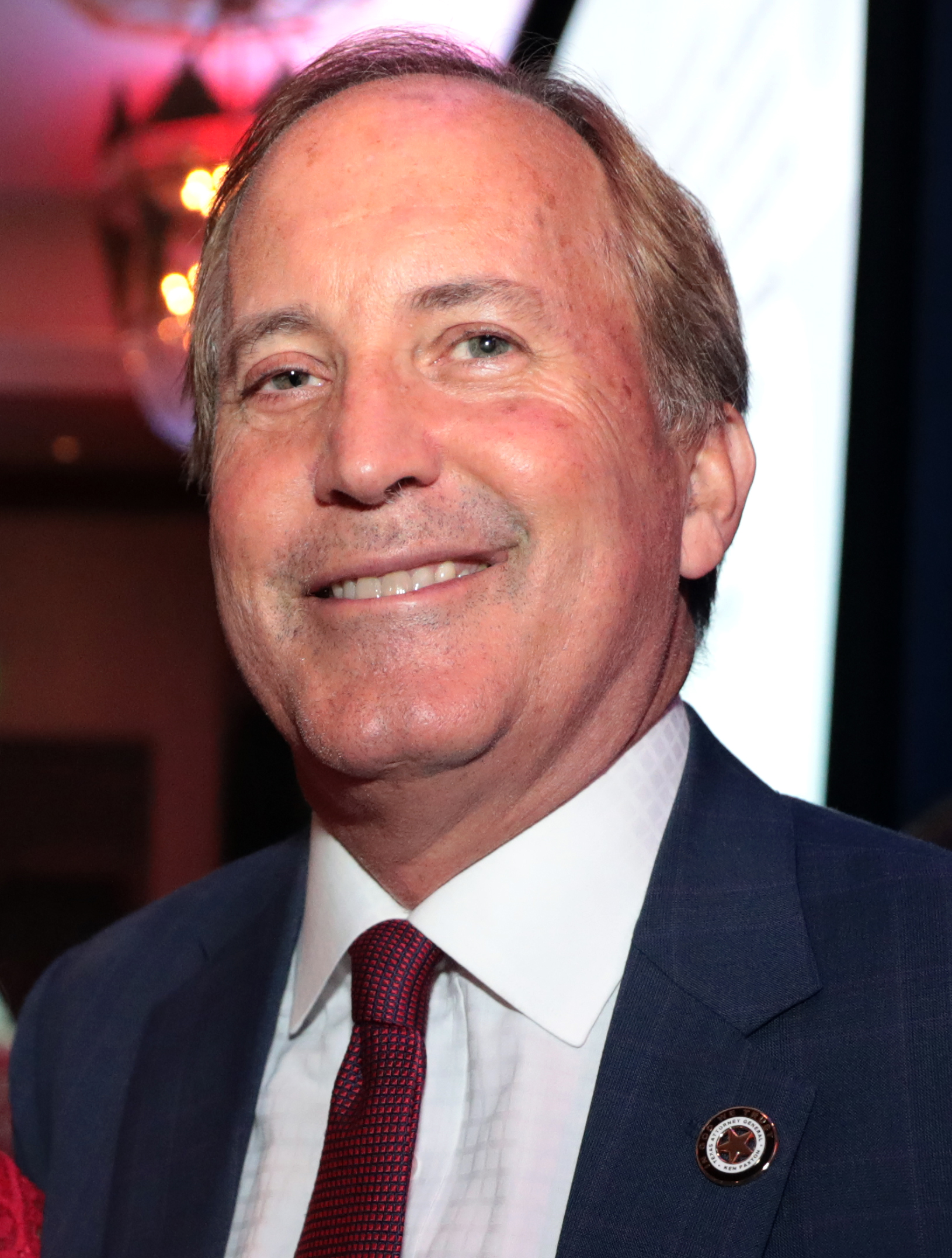
Ken Paxton

- Andrew Bailey, Attorney General of Missouri (2023–2025)
- Brenna Bird, Attorney General of Iowa (2023–present)
- Christopher M. Carr, Attorney General of Georgia (2016–present)
- Russell Coleman, Attorney General of Kentucky (2024–present) and U.S. Attorney for the Western District of Kentucky (2017–2021)
- Lynn Fitch, Attorney General of Mississippi (2020–present)
- Tim Griffin, Attorney General of Arkansas (2023–present)
- Marty Jackley, Attorney General of South Dakota (2023–present, 2009–2019) and U.S. Attorney for the District of South Dakota (2006–2009)
- Austin Knudsen, Attorney General of Montana (2021–present)
- Kris Kobach, Attorney General of Kansas (2023–present)
- Raúl Labrador, Attorney General of Idaho (2023–present)
- Jason Miyares, Attorney General of Virginia (2022–2026)
- Ashley Moody, Attorney General of Florida (2019–2025)
- Patrick Morrisey, Attorney General of West Virginia (2013–2025) and Republican nominee for Governor of West Virginia in 2024
- Liz Murrill, Attorney General of Louisiana (2024–present)
- Ken Paxton, Attorney General of Texas (2015–present)
- Sean Reyes, Attorney General of Utah (2013–2025)
- Todd Rokita, Attorney General of Indiana (2021–present) and U.S. Representative of IN-04 (2011–2019)
- Alan Wilson, Attorney General of South Carolina (2011–present)
- Drew Wrigley, Attorney General of North Dakota (2022–present) and U.S. Attorney for the District of North Dakota (2019–2021, 2001–2009)
- Dave Yost, Attorney General of Ohio (2019–2026)

=== Secretaries of state ===
- Michael Adams, Secretary of State of Kentucky (2020–present)
- Wes Allen, Secretary of State of Alabama (2023–present)
- Jay Ashcroft, Secretary of State of Missouri (2017–2025)
- Chuck Gray, Secretary of State of Wyoming (2023–present)
- Mark Hammond, Secretary of State of South Carolina (2003–present)
- Christi Jacobsen, Secretary of State of Montana (2021–present)
- Frank LaRose, Secretary of State of Ohio (2019–present) and Republican candidate for U.S. Senate from Ohio in 2024

=== Treasurers ===
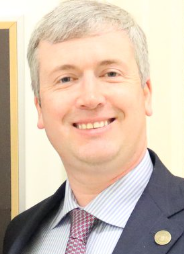
David McRae

- Daniel Elliot, Treasurer of Indiana (2023–present)
- John Fleming, Treasurer of Louisiana (2024–present) and U.S. Representative of LA-04 (2009–2017)
- Stacy Garrity, Treasurer of Pennsylvania (2021–present)
- John Leiber, Treasurer of Wisconsin (2023–present)
- Curtis Loftis, Treasurer of South Carolina (2011–present)
- Vivek Malek, Treasurer of Missouri (2023–present)
- David McRae, Treasurer of Mississippi (2020–present)
- Mark Metcalf, Treasurer of Kentucky (2024–present)
- Riley Moore, Treasurer of West Virginia (2021–2025) and Republican nominee for U.S. Representative from WV-02 in 2024
- Marlo Oaks, Treasurer of Utah (2021–present)
- Robert Sprague, Treasurer of Ohio (2019–present)

=== Auditors ===
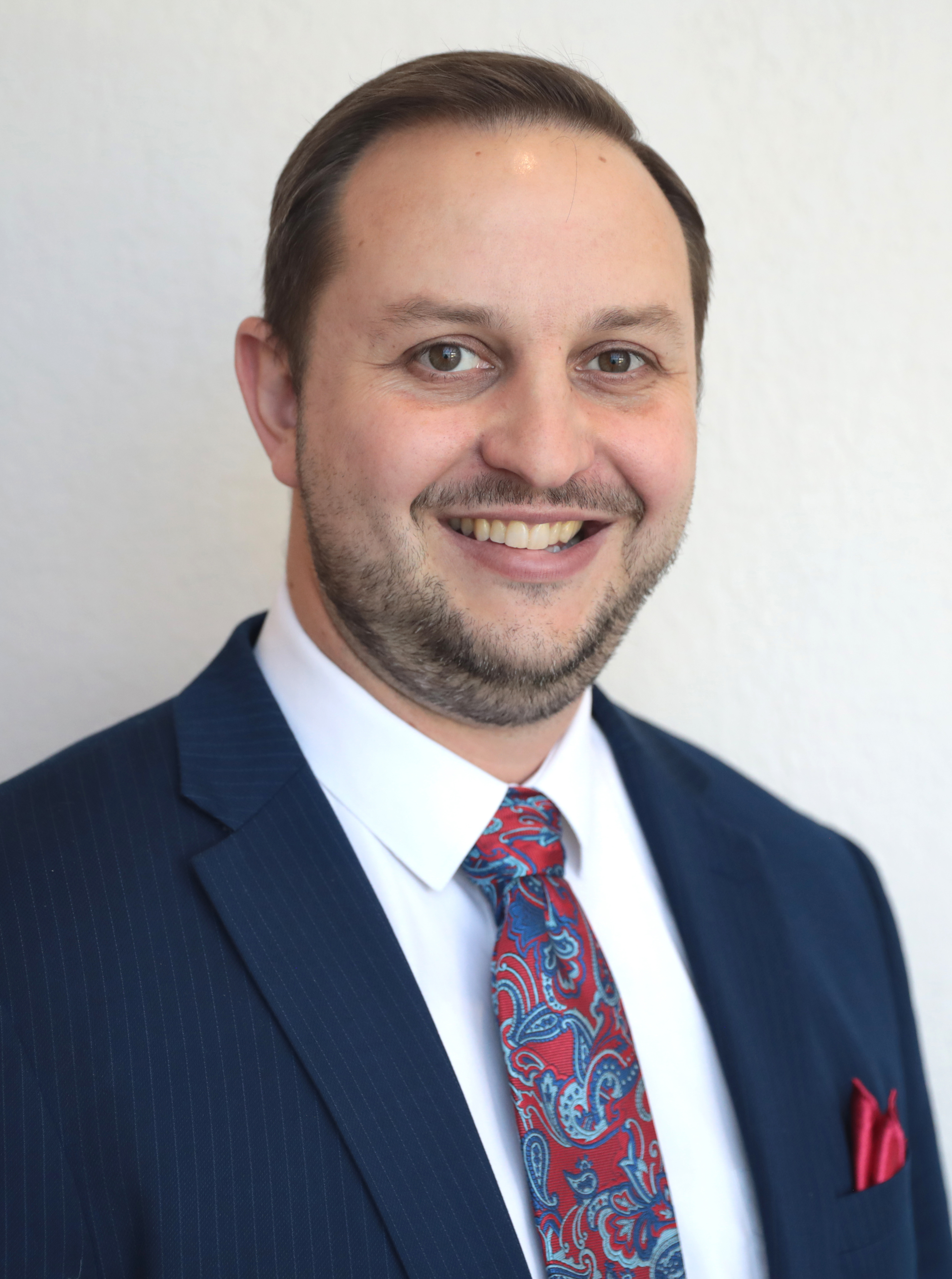
Andrew Sorrell

- Allison Ball, Auditor of Kentucky (2024–present)
- Cindy Byrd, Auditor and Inspector of Oklahoma (2019–present)
- Troy Downing, Auditor of Montana (2021–2025) and Republican nominee for U.S. Representative from MT-02 in 2024
- Keith Faber, Auditor of Ohio (2019–present)
- Scott Fitzpatrick, Auditor of Missouri (2023–present)
- Josh Gallion, Auditor of North Dakota (2017–present)
- JB McCuskey, Auditor of West Virginia (2017–2025) and Republican nominee for Attorney General of West Virginia in 2024
- Elise Nieshalla, Auditor of Indiana (2023–present)
- Andrew Sorrell, Auditor of Alabama (2023–present)
- Shad White, Auditor of Mississippi (2018–present)

=== Agriculture commissioners ===
- Andy Gipson, Agriculture and Commerce Commissioner of Mississippi (2018–present)
- Tyler Harper, Agriculture Commissioner of Georgia (2023–present)
- Sid Miller, Agriculture Commissioner of Texas (2015–present)
- Rick Pate, Agriculture Commissioner of Alabama (2019–present)
- Jonathan Shell, Agriculture Commissioner of Kentucky (2024–present)
- Wilton Simpson, Agriculture Commissioner of Florida (2023–present)
- Hugh Weathers, Agriculture Commissioner of South Carolina (2004–present)

=== Superintendents of public instruction ===
- Elsie Arntzen, Superintendent of Public Instruction of Montana (2017–2025)
- Ryan Walters, Superintendent of Public Instruction of Oklahoma (2023–2025)

=== Insurance commissioners ===
- Mike Chaney, Insurance Commissioner of Mississippi (2008–present)
- John F. King, Insurance Commissioner of Georgia (2019–present)

=== Public service commissioners ===
- Chris Beeker, Member of the Alabama Public Service Commission from Place 2 (2015–2024)
- Chris Brown, Member of the Mississippi Public Service Commission from the Northern District (2024–present)
- Twinkle Andress Cavanaugh, President of the Alabama Public Service Commission (2013–2025) and Member of the Alabama Public Service Commission (2011–2025)
- Julie Fedorchak, Member of the North Dakota Public Service Commission (2012–2025) and Republican nominee for U.S. Representative from ND-AL in 2024
- Bubba McDonald, Member of the Georgia Public Service Commission from the 4th district (2009–present, 1998–2003)
- Jeremy H. Oden, Member of the Alabama Public Service Commission from Place 1 (2013–present)
- Eric Skrmetta, Member of the Louisiana Public Service Commission from the 1st district (2009–present)
- Kevin Stocker, Member of the Nebraska Public Service Commission from the 5th district (2023–present)
- Doyle Webb, Chair of the Arkansas Public Service Commission (2023–present) and Member of the Arkansas Public Service Commission (2023–present)

==== Other ====
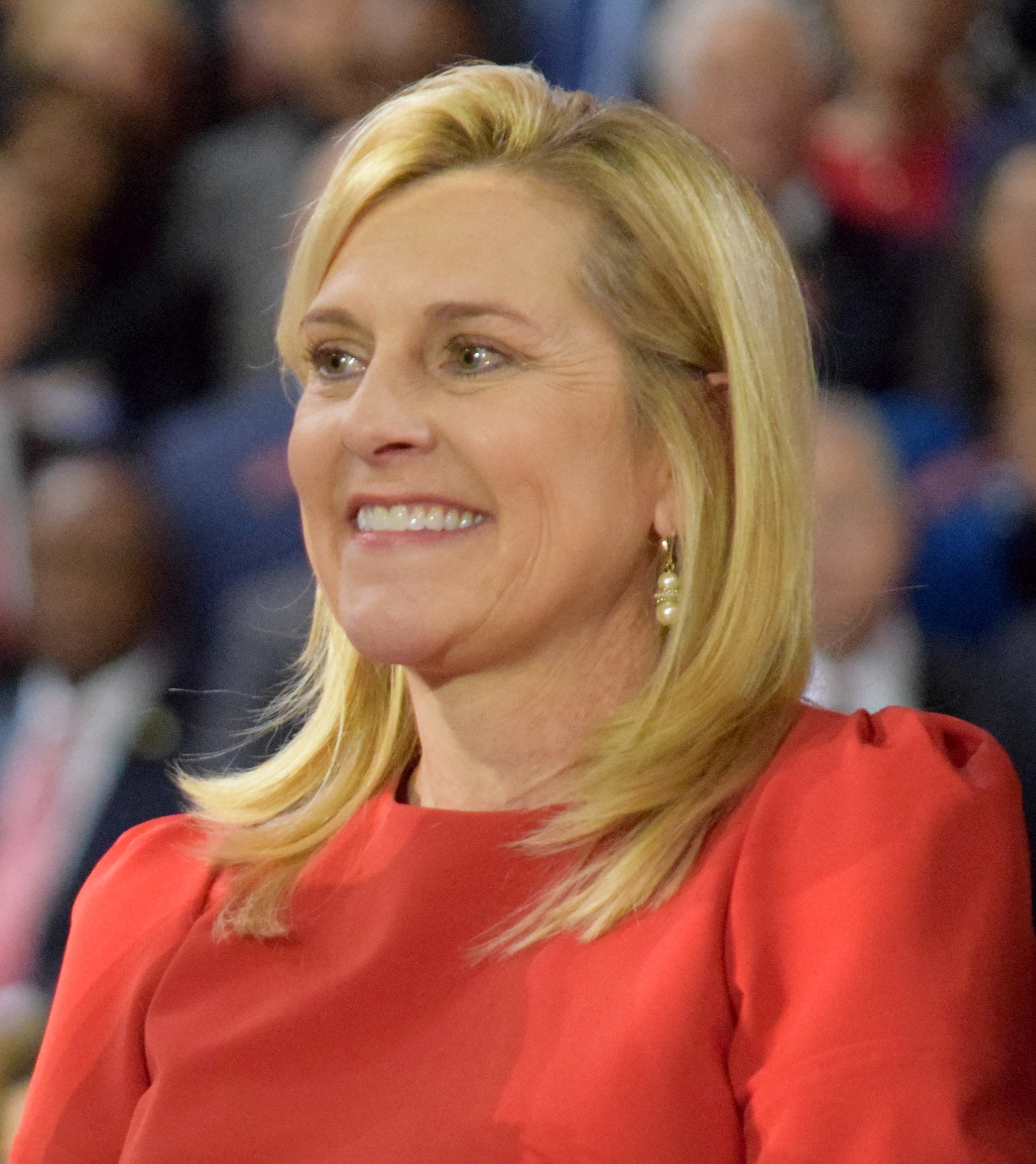
Marty Kemp

- Dawn Buckingham, Land Commissioner of Texas (2023–present)
- Robert M. Duncan Jr., Deputy Attorney General of Kentucky (2024–present) and U.S. Attorney for the Eastern District of Kentucky (2017–2021)
- Marty Kemp, First Lady of Georgia (2019–present)
- Wes Nofire, Oklahoma Native American Affairs Liaison (2023–present)
- Jimmy Patronis, Chief Financial Officer of Florida (2017–2025)
- Ryan Terrell, Member of the New Hampshire State Board of Education from the 5th district (2021–2025)
- Bruce Thompson, Labor Commissioner of Georgia (2023–2024)

== State legislators ==
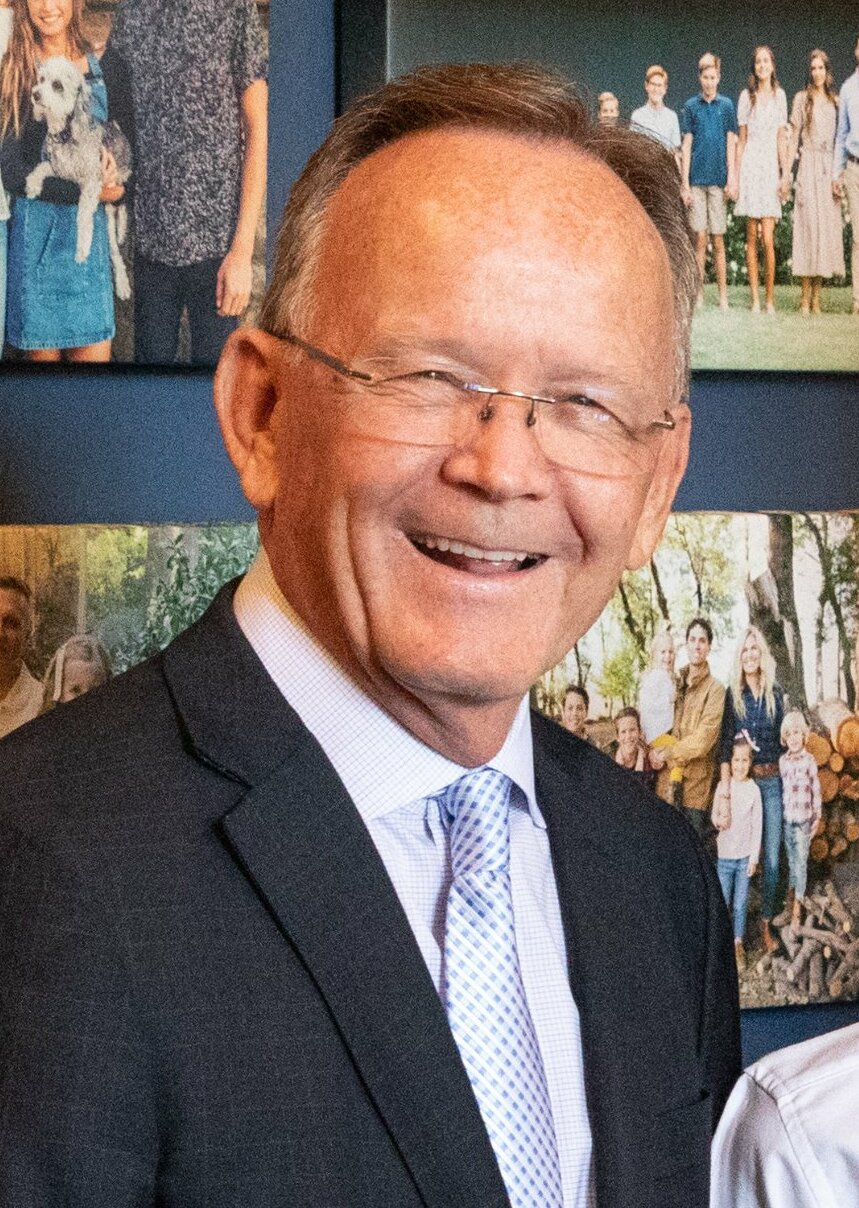
Stuart Adams

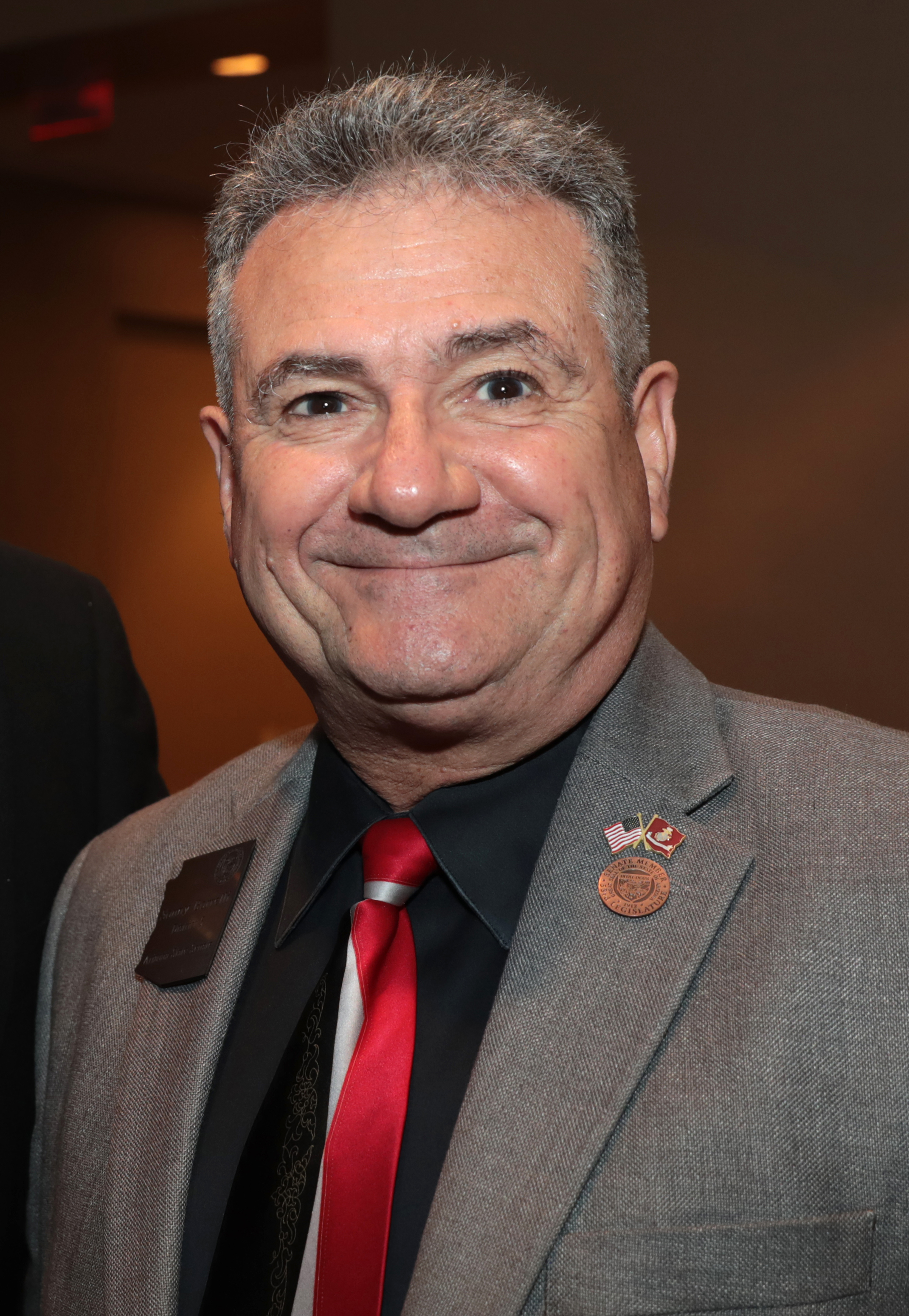
Sonny Borrelli

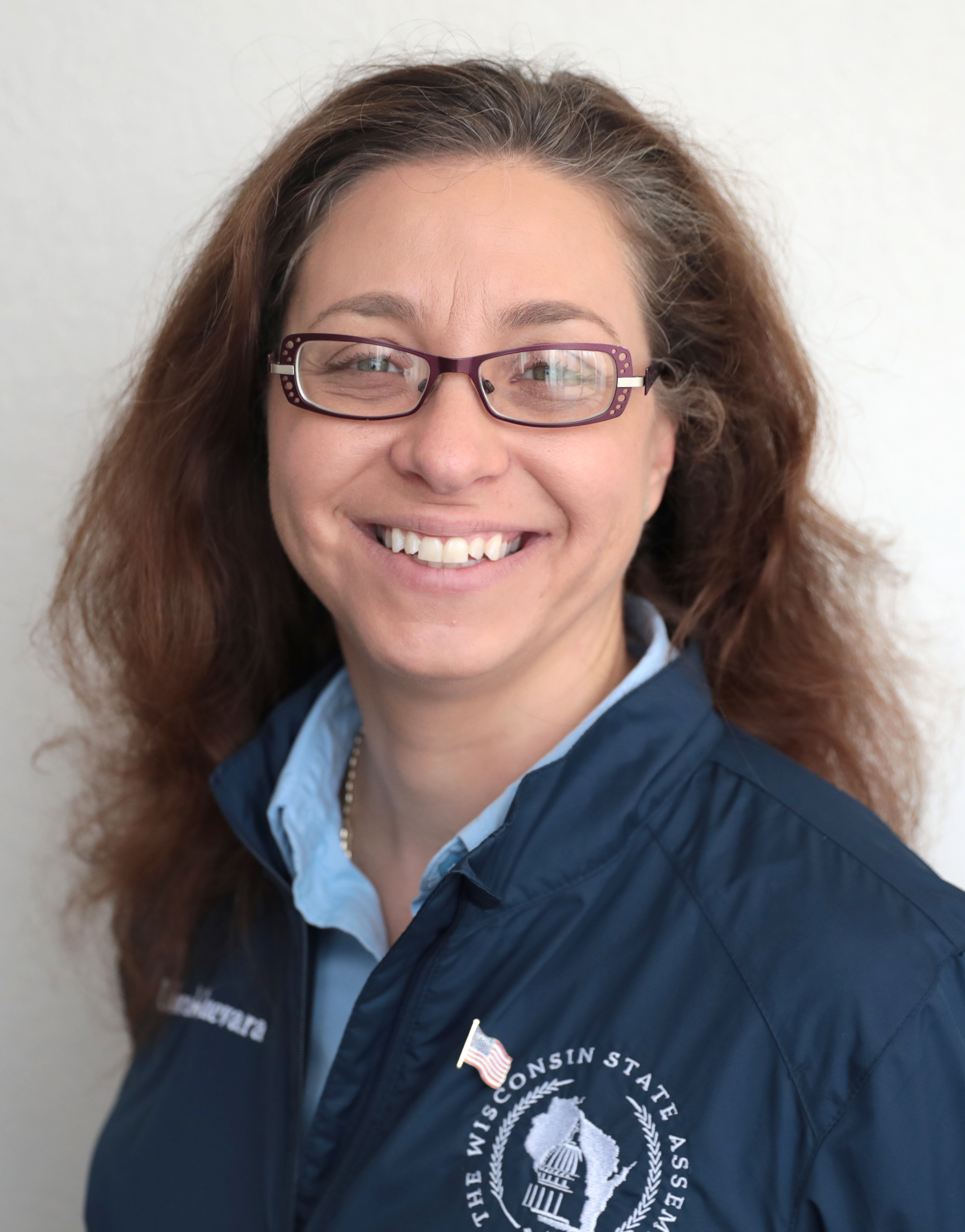
Rachael Cabral-Guevara

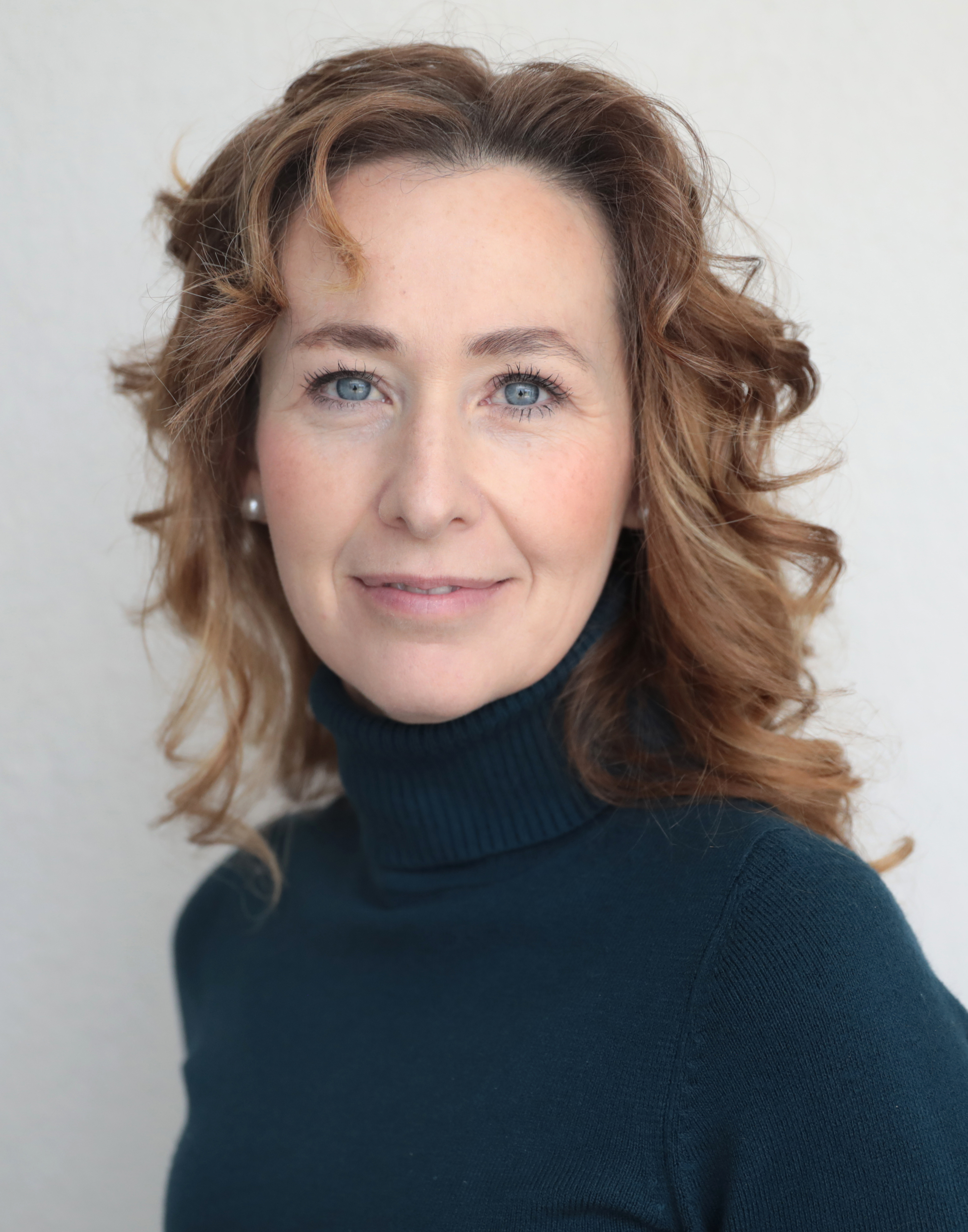
Jill Carter

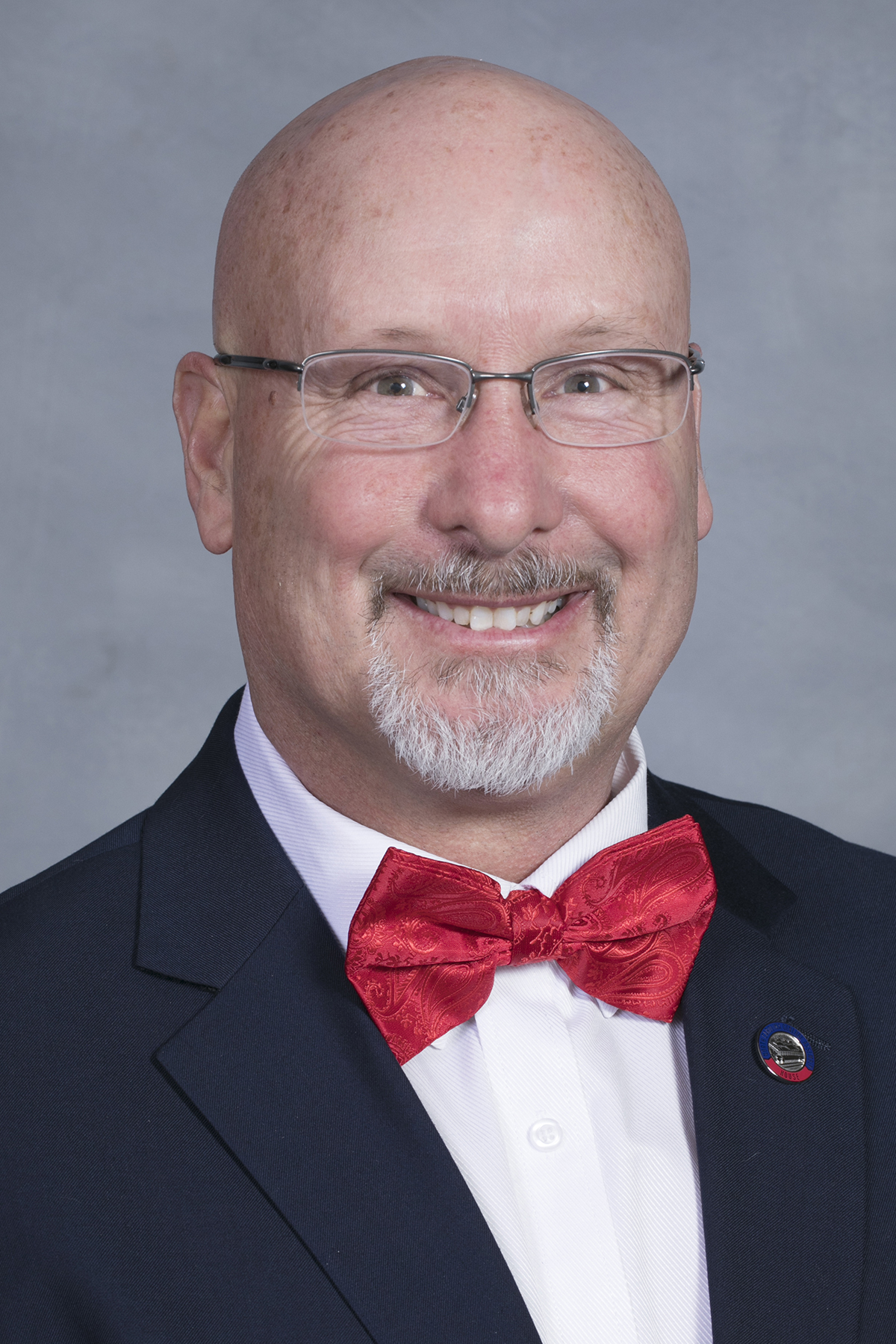
Bobby Hanig

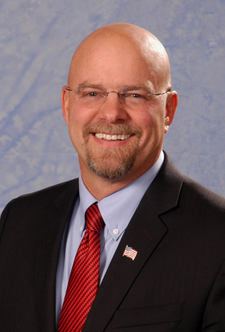
Ira Hansen

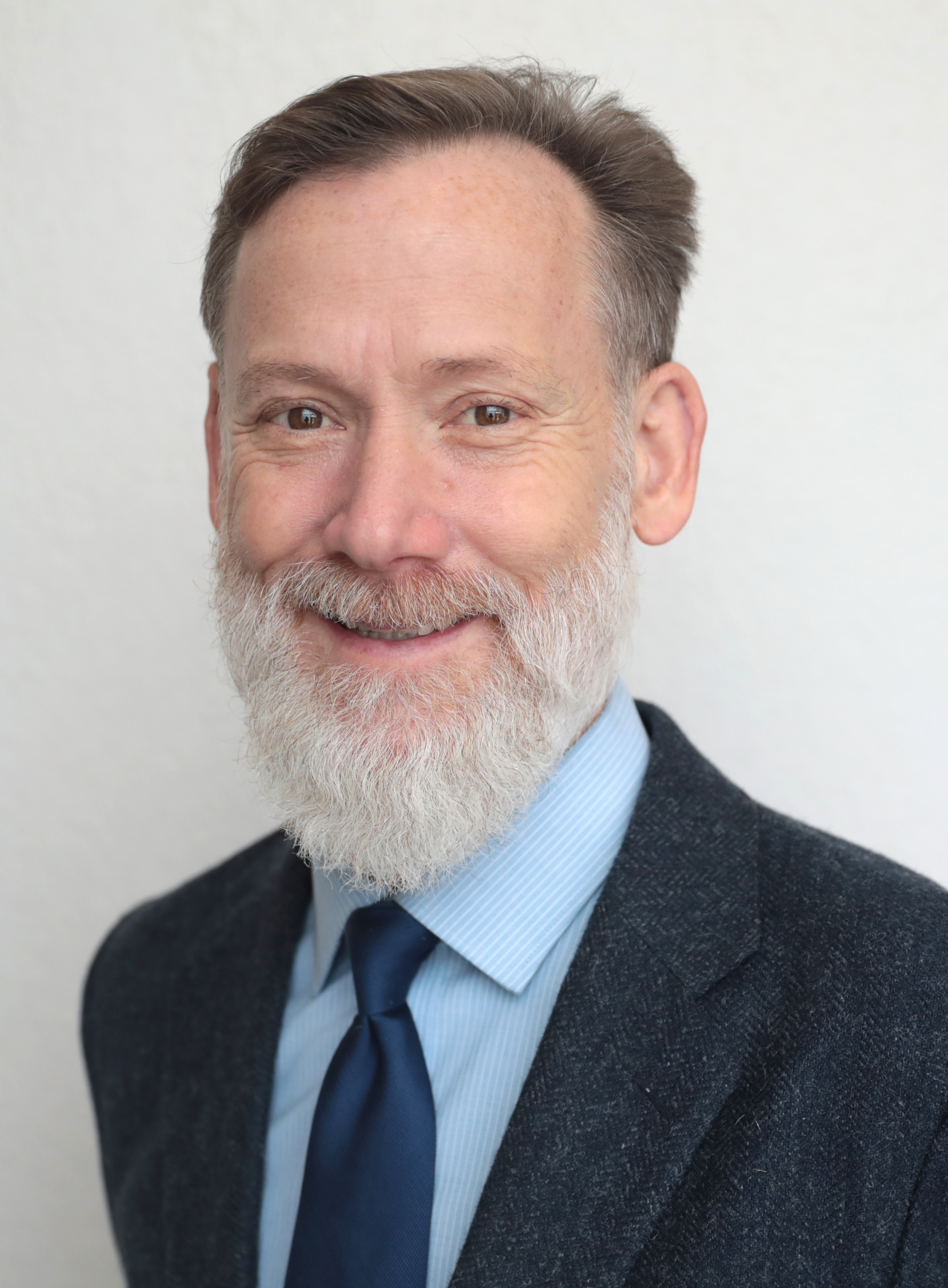
Scott Herndon

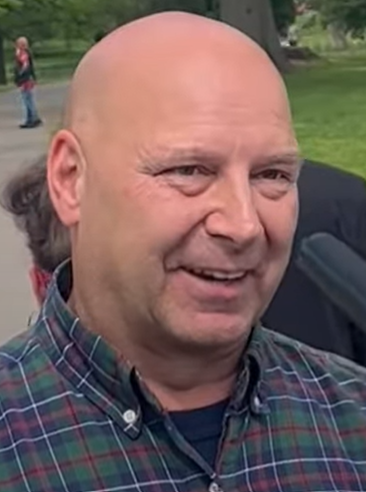
Doug Mastriano

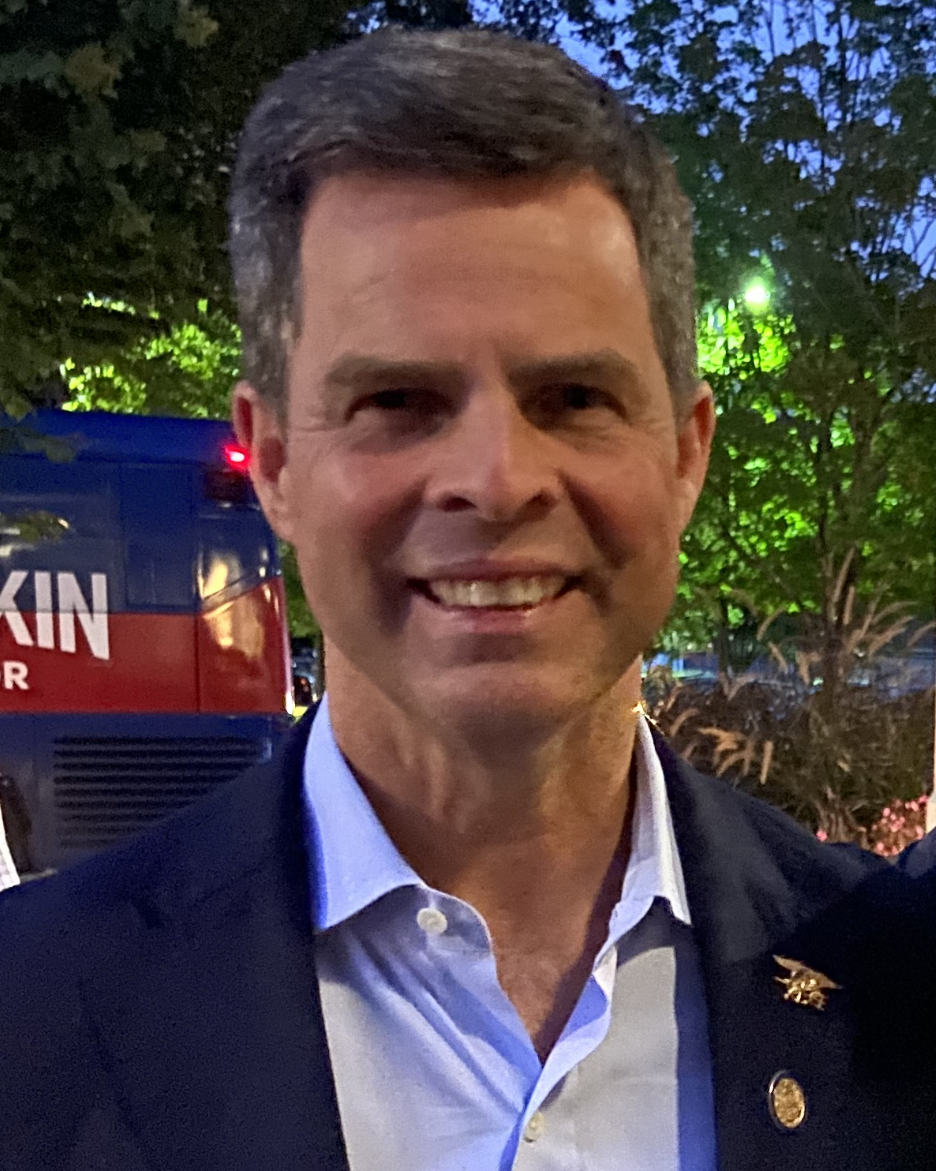
John McGuire

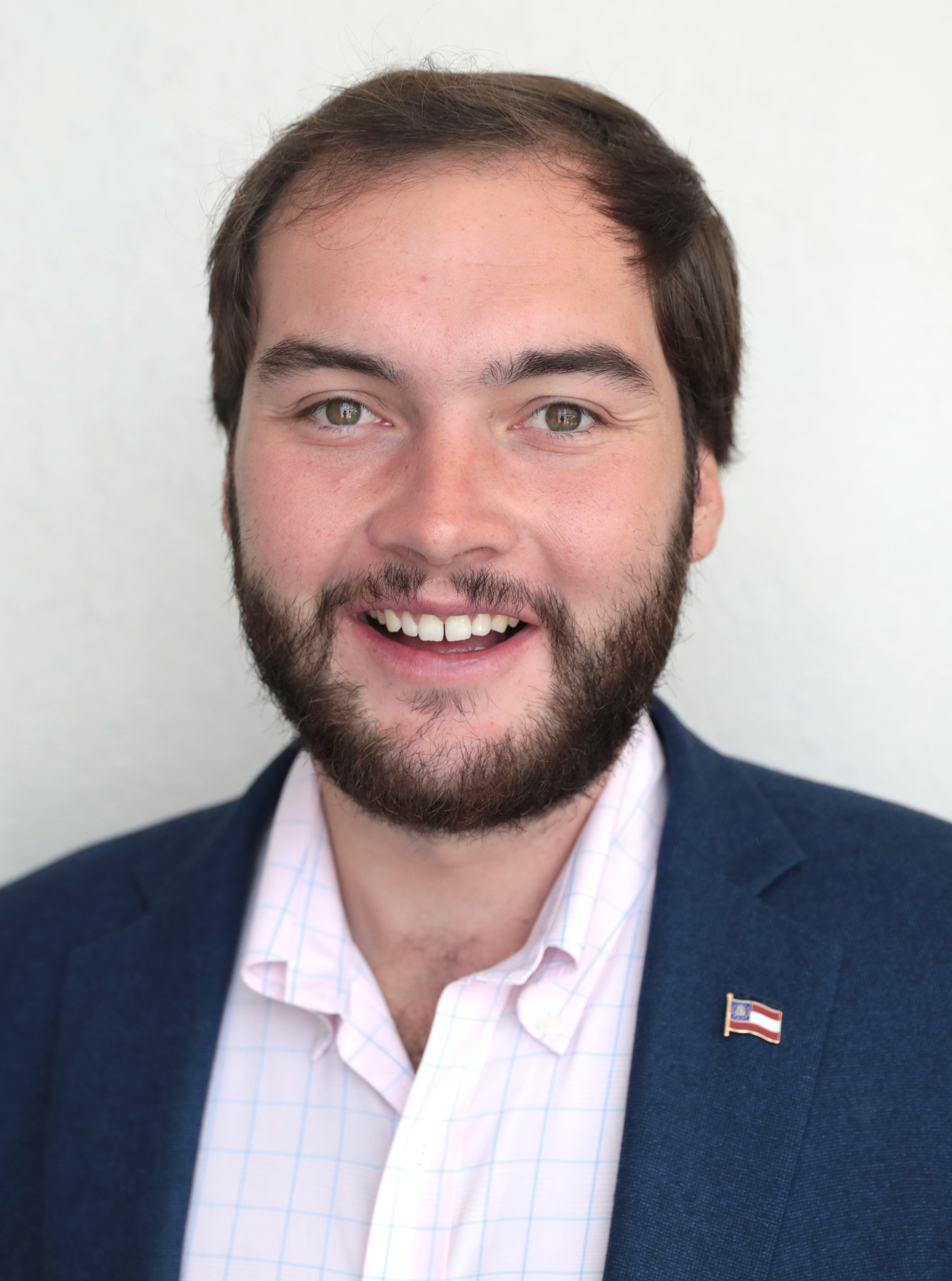
Colton Moore

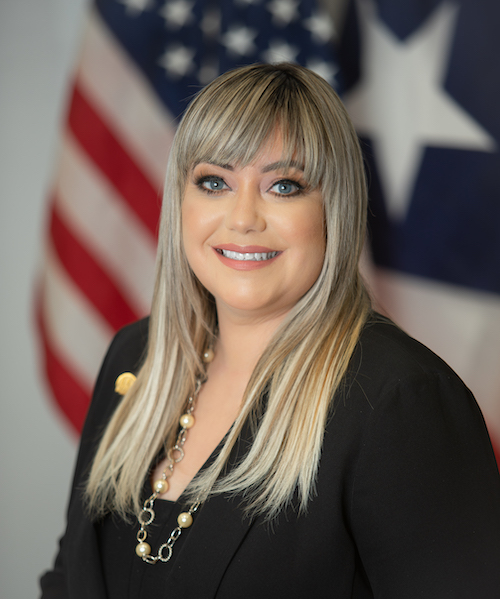
Keren Riquelme

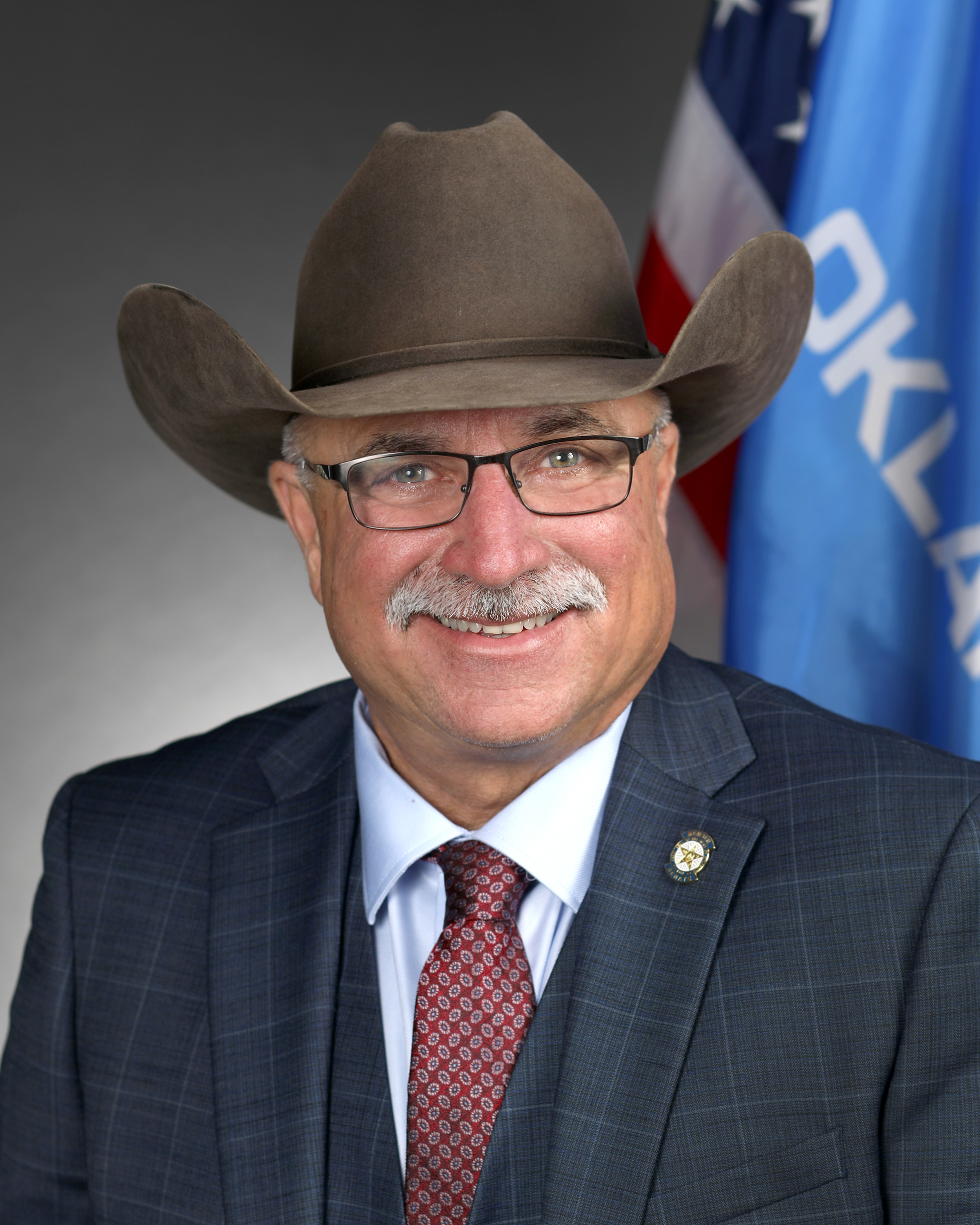
Blake Stephens

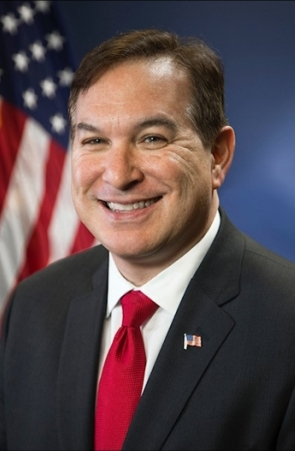
Michael B. Stuart

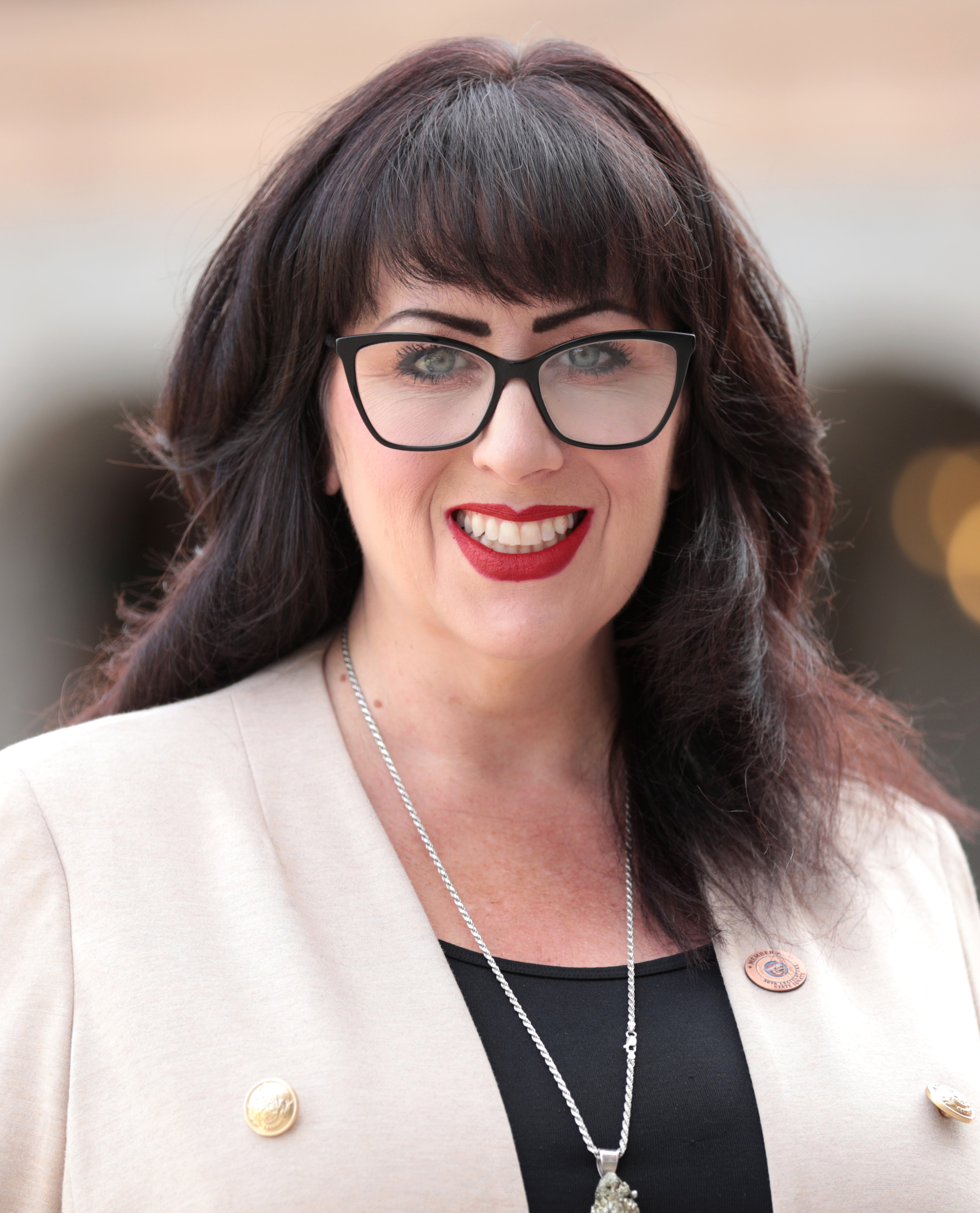
Justine Wadsack

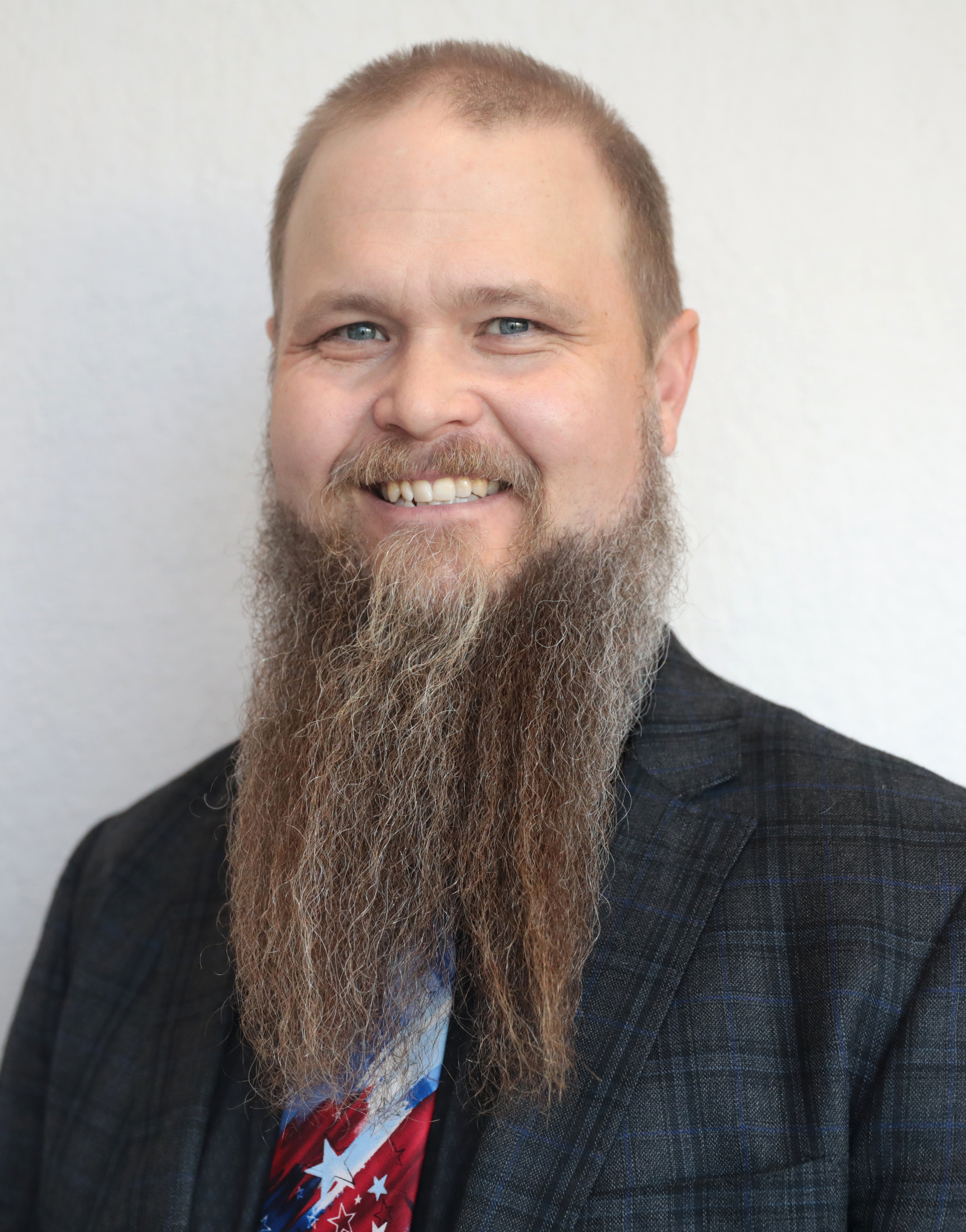
Nathan Wesenberg

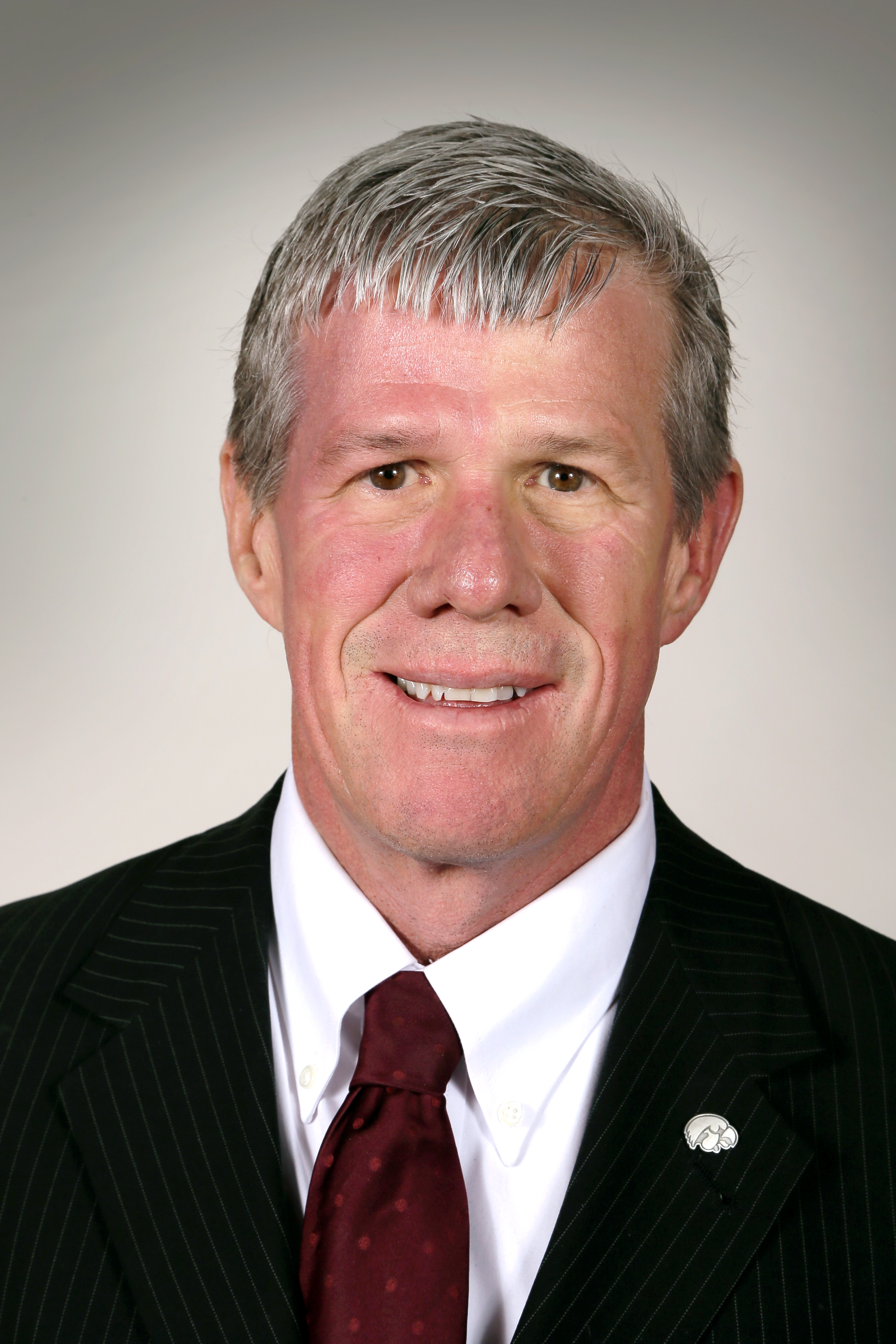
Brad Zaun

=== Senators ===
==== Alabama Senate ====
- Lance Bell, 11th district (2022–present)
- Chris Elliott, 32nd district (2018–present)
- Keith Kelley, 12th district (2022–present)
- Wes Kitchens, 9th district (2024–present)
- Greg Reed, 5th district (2010–2025), President pro tempore (2021–2025)
- J. T. Waggoner, 16th district (1990–present)
- April Weaver, 14th district (2021–present)

==== Arizona Senate ====
- Sonny Borrelli, 30th district (2023–2025), 5th district (2017–2023), Majority Leader (2023–2025)
- Frank Carroll, 28th district (2023–present)
- Dave Farnsworth, 10th district (2023–present), 16th district (2013–2021)
- David Gowan, 19th district (2023–present), 14th district (2019–2023)
- Jake Hoffman, 15th district (2023–present)
- Anthony Kern, 27th District (2023–2025)
- Sine Kerr, 25th district (2023–2025), 13th district (2013–2021), Majority Whip (2023–2025)
- Warren Petersen, 14th District (2023–present), 12th District (2021–2023, 2017–2019), President of the Senate (2023–present)
- Janae Shamp, 29th district (2023–present)
- T.J. Shope, 16th district (2023–present), 11th district (2021–2023), President pro tempore (2023–present)
- Wendy Rogers, 7th district (2023–present), 6th district (2021–2023)
- Justine Wadsack, 17th district (2023–2025)

==== Arkansas Senate ====
- Justin Boyd, 27th district (2023–present)
- Joshua P. Bryant, 32nd district (2023–present)
- Jim Dotson, 34th district (2023–present)
- Bart Hester, 33rd district (2023–present), 1st district (2013–2023), President pro tempore (2023–present)
- Mark Johnson, 17th district (2023–present), 15th district (2019–2023)

==== California Senate ====
- Shannon Grove, 12th district (2022–present), 16th district (2018–2022), Minority Leader (2019–2021)

==== Colorado Senate ====
- Janice Rich, 7th district (2023–present)

==== Connecticut Senate ====
- Stephen Harding, 30th district (2023–present), Minority Leader (2024–present)

==== Florida Senate ====
- Ben Albritton, 27th district (2018–present), Majority Leader (2022–present)
- Jason Brodeur, 10th district (2022–present)
- Alexis Calatayud, 38th district (2022–present)
- Jay Collins, 14th district (2022–present)
- Nick DiCeglie, 18th district (2022–present)
- Ileana Garcia, 36th district (2022–present), 37th district (2020–2022)
- Joe Gruters, 22nd district (2022–present), 23rd district (2018–2022); Chair of the Republican Party of Florida (2019–2023)
- Ed Hooper, 21st district (2022–present), 16th district (2018–2022)
- Blaise Ingoglia, 11th district (2022–present)
- Debbie Mayfield, 19th district (2022–present), 17th district (2016–2022)
- Kathleen Passidomo, 28th district (2016–present), President of the Senate (2022–present)
- Ana Maria Rodriguez, 40th district (2022–present), 39th district (2020–2022)
- Corey Simon, 3rd district (2022–present)
- Jay Trumbull, 2nd district (2022–present)

==== Georgia Senate ====
- Jason Anavitarte, 31st district (2021–present)
- Lee Anderson, 24th district (2017–present)
- Brandon Beach, 21st district (2013–present)
- Matt Brass, 28th district (2017–present)
- Clint Dixon, 45th district (2021–present)
- Greg Dolezal, 27th district (2019–present)
- Frank Ginn, 47th district (2011–present)
- Steve Gooch, 51st district (2011–present), Majority Leader (2023–present)
- Russ Goodman, 8th district (2021–present)
- Marty Harbin, 16th district (2015–present)
- Bo Hatchett, 50th district (2021–present)
- Billy Hickman, 4th district (2020–present)
- John F. Kennedy, 18th district (2015–present), President pro tempore (2023–present)
- Colton Moore, 53rd district (2023–present)
- Brian Strickland, 17th district (2018–present)
- Carden Summers, 13th district (2020–present)
- Blake Tillery, 19th district (2017–present)
- Sam Watson, 11th district (2023–present)

==== Idaho Senate ====
- Scott Herndon, 1st district (2022–present)
- Tammy Nichols, 10th district (2022–present)

==== Illinois Senate ====
- Andrew Chesney, 45th district (2023–present)
- Sue Rezin, 38th district (2010–present)

==== Indiana Senate ====
- Mark Messmer, 48th district (2014–present), Republican nominee for U.S. Representative from IN-08 in 2024
- Andy Zay, 17th district (2016–present)

==== Iowa Senate ====
- Kevin Alons, 7th district (2023–present)
- Lynn Evans, 3rd district (2023–present)
- Julian Garrett, 11th district (2023–present), 13th district (2013–2023)
- Tim Kraayenbrink, 4th district (2023–present), 5th district (2015–2023)
- Charlie McClintock, 42nd district (2023–present)
- Jeff Taylor, 2nd district (2021–present)
- Cherielynn Westrich, 13th district (2023–present)
- Brad Zaun, 22nd district (2023–present), 20th district (2013–2023), 32nd district (2005–2013), President pro tempore (2021–present)

==== Kentucky Senate ====
- Phillip Wheeler, 31st district (2019–present)

==== Louisiana Senate ====
- Rick Edmonds, 6th district (2024–present)
- Mike Fesi, 20th district (2020–present)

==== Maryland Senate ====
- Johnny Mautz, 37th district (2023–present)
- Johnny Ray Salling, 6th district (2015–present)

==== Michigan Senate ====
- Joe Bellino, 16th district (2023–present)
- Jon Bumstead, 32nd district (2023–present), 34th district (2019–2022)
- Kevin Daley, 26th district (2023–present), 31st district (2019–2022)
- Roger Hauck, 34th district (2023–present)
- Michele Hoitenga, 36th district (2023–present)
- Dan Lauwers, 25th district (2019–present)
- Jonathan Lindsey, 17th district (2023–present)
- Ed McBroom, 38th district (2019–present)
- Aric Nesbitt, 38th district (2023–present), 26th district (2019–2022), Minority Leader (2023–present)
- Rick Outman, 33rd district (2019–present)
- Jim Runestad, 23rd district (2023–present), 15th district (2019–2022)
- Roger Victory, 31st district (2023–present), 30th district (2019–2022)

==== Minnesota Senate ====
- Steve Drazkowski, 20th district (2023–present)
- Nathan Wesenberg, 10th district (2023–present)

==== Mississippi Senate ====
- Jason Barrett, 39th district (2020–present)
- Kevin Blackwell, 19th district (2016–present)
- Joel Carter, 49th district (2018–present)
- Lydia Chassaniol, 14th district (2008–present)
- Kathy Chism, 3rd district (2020–present)
- Dennis DeBar, 43rd district (2016–present)
- Jeremy England, 50th district (2020–present)
- Joey Fillingane, 41st district (2006–present)
- Angela Burks Hill, 40th district (2012–present)
- Michael McLendon, 1st district (2020–present)
- Brian Rhodes, 36th district (2024–present)
- Robin Robinson, 2nd district (2024–present)
- Mike Seymour, 47th district (2016–present)
- Benjamin Suber, 8th district (2020–present)
- Jeff Tate, 33rd district (2020–present)
- Neil Whaley, 10th district (2017–present)

==== Missouri Senate ====
- Rick Brattin, 31st district (2021–present)
- Jill Carter, 32nd district (2023–present)
- Mary Elizabeth Coleman, 22nd district (2023–present)
- Bill Eigel, 23rd district (2017–present)
- Denny Hoskins, 21st district (2017–present)
- Mike Moon, 29th district (2021–present)
- Nick Schroer, 2nd district (2023–present)
- Holly Thompson Rehder, 27th district (2021–present)
- Curtis Trent, 20th district (2023–present)

==== Montana Senate ====
- Kenneth Bogner, 19th district (2019–present), President pro tempore (2023–present)

==== Nevada Senate ====
- Ira Hansen, 14th district (2018–present)
- Lisa Krasner, 16th district (2022–present)

==== New Hampshire Senate ====
- Kevin Avard, 12th district (2020–present, 2014–2018)
- Bill Gannon, 23rd district (2020–present, 2014–2018)
- Timothy Lang Sr., 2nd district (2022–present)

==== New Jersey Senate ====
- Carmen Amato, 9th district (2024–present)
- Joseph Pennacchio, 26th district (2008–present), Minority Whip (2017–present)
- Parker Space, 24th district (2024–present)
- Doug Steinhardt, 23rd district (2022–present)
- Mike Testa, 1st district (2019–present)

==== New York Senate ====
- Rob Ortt, 62nd district (2015–present), Minority Leader (2020–present)
- Dan Stec, 45th district (2021–present)

==== North Carolina Senate ====
- Lisa Stone Barnes, 24th district (2021–present)
- Danny Britt, 24th district (2023–present), 13th district (2017–2023)
- Michael Lazzara, 6th district (2021–present)

==== North Dakota Senate ====
- Jeffrey Magrum, 8th district (2022–present)

==== Northern Mariana Islands Senate ====
- Dennis C. Mendiola, 1st district (2023–present)

==== Ohio Senate ====
- Niraj Antani, 6th district (2021–present)
- Matt Dolan, 24th district (2017–present)
- Theresa Gavarone, 2nd district (2019–present)
- George Lang, 4th district (2021–present)
- Sandra O'Brien, 32nd district (2021–present)
- Shane Wilkin, 17th district (2023–present)

==== Oklahoma Senate ====
- Jerry Alvord, 14th district (2022–present)
- George Burns, 5th district (2021–present)
- Nathan Dahm, 33rd district (2013–present)
- Warren Hamilton, 7th district (2021–present)
- Casey Murdock, 27th district (2018–present)
- Rob Standridge, 15th district (2012–present)
- Blake Stephens, 3rd district (2021–present)
- Jack Stewart, 18th district (2022–present)
- Tom Woods, 4th district (2022–present)

==== Pennsylvania Senate ====
- Jarrett Coleman, 16th district (2023–present)
- Cris Dush, 25th district (2021–present)
- Doug Mastriano, 33rd district (2019–present), Republican nominee for Governor of Pennsylvania in 2022
- Tracy Pennycuick, 24th district (2023–present)
- Greg Rothman, 34th district (2023–present)
- Kim Ward, 39th district (2009–present), President pro tempore (2022–present)

==== Puerto Rico Senate ====
- Keren Riquelme, at-large district (2020–present) (New Progressive)

==== South Carolina Senate ====
- Brian Adams, 44th district (2020–present)
- Ronnie Cromer, 18th district (2003–present)
- Billy Garrett, 10th district (2020–present)
- Penry Gustafson, 27th district (2020–present)
- Josh Kimbrell, 11th district (2020–present)
- Rex Rice, 2nd district (2016–present)
- Danny Verdin, 10th district (2020–present)

==== Tennessee Senate ====
- Janice Bowling, 16th district (2013–present)
- Dawn White, 13th district (2019–present)

==== Texas Senate ====
- Paul Bettencourt, 7th district (2015–present)
- Brandon Creighton, 4th district (2014–present)

==== Utah Senate ====
- Stuart Adams, 7th district (2023–present), 22nd district (2009–2023), President of the Senate (2019–present)
- Kirk Cullimore Jr., 19th district (2023–present), 19th district (2019–2023)
- Keith Grover, 23rd district (2023–present), 15th district (2018–2023)
- David Hinkins, 26th district (2023–present), 27th district (2009–2023)
- John D. Johnson, 3rd district (2023–present), 19th district (2021–2023)
- Mike Kennedy, 21st district (2023–present), 14th district (2021–2023), Republican nominee for U.S. Representative from UT-03 in 2024
- Derrin Owens, 27th district (2023–present), 24th district (2021–2023)

==== Virginia Senate ====
- Christie Craig, 19th district (2024–present)
- Bill DeSteph, 20th district (2024–present), 8th district (2016–2024)
- Danny Diggs, 24th district (2024–present)
- Tara Durant, 27th district (2024–present)
- Travis Hackworth, 5th district (2024–present), 38th district (2021–2024)
- Chris Head, 3rd district (2024–present)
- Emily Brewer, 17th district (2024–present)
- John McGuire, 10th district (2024–present), Republican nominee for U.S. Representative from VA-05 in 2024
- Tammy Brankley Mulchi, 9th district (2024–present)
- Mark Peake, 8th district (2024–present), 22nd district (2017–2024)
- Todd Pillion, 6th district (2024–present), 40th district (2020–2024)
- Bryce Reeves, 28th district (2024–present), 17th district (2012–2024)
- Bill Stanley, 7th district (2024–present), the 20th district (2012–2024), 19th district (2011–2012)
- Glen Sturtevant, 12th district (2024–present), 10th district (2016–2020)

==== Washington Senate ====
- Judy Warnick, 13th district (2015–present)

==== West Virginia Senate ====
- Mike Azinger, 3rd district (2017–present)
- Laura Wakim Chapman, 1st district (2022–present)
- Vince Deeds, 10th district (2022–present)
- Amy Grady, 4th district (2020–present)
- Mark Hunt, 8th district (2022–present), Republican nominee for Auditor of West Virginia in 2024
- Robert L. Karnes, 14th district (2020–present, 2015–2018)
- Rupie Phillips, 7th district (2020–present)
- Michael B. Stuart, 7th district (2022–present) and U.S. Attorney for the Southern District of West Virginia (2018–2021)
- Eric Tarr, 4th district (2019–present)
- Jack Woodrum, 10th district (2020–present)

==== Wisconsin Senate ====
- Julian Bradley, 28th district (2021–present)
- Rachael Cabral-Guevara, 19th district (2023–present)
- André Jacque, 1st district (2019–present)
- Cory Tomczyk, 29th district (2023–present)

==== Wyoming Senate ====
- James Lee Anderson, 28th district (2013–present)

=== Representatives ===
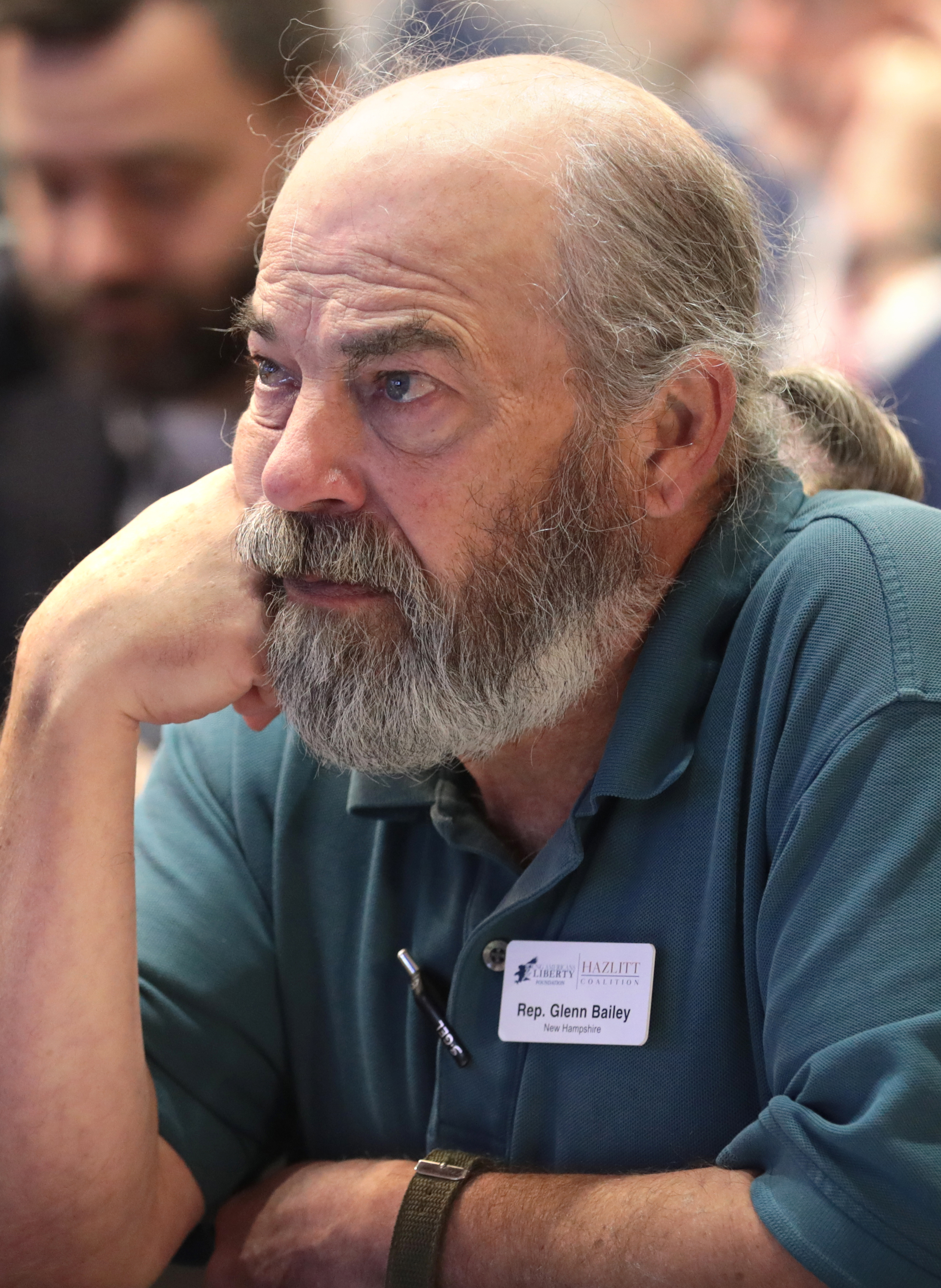
Glenn Bailey

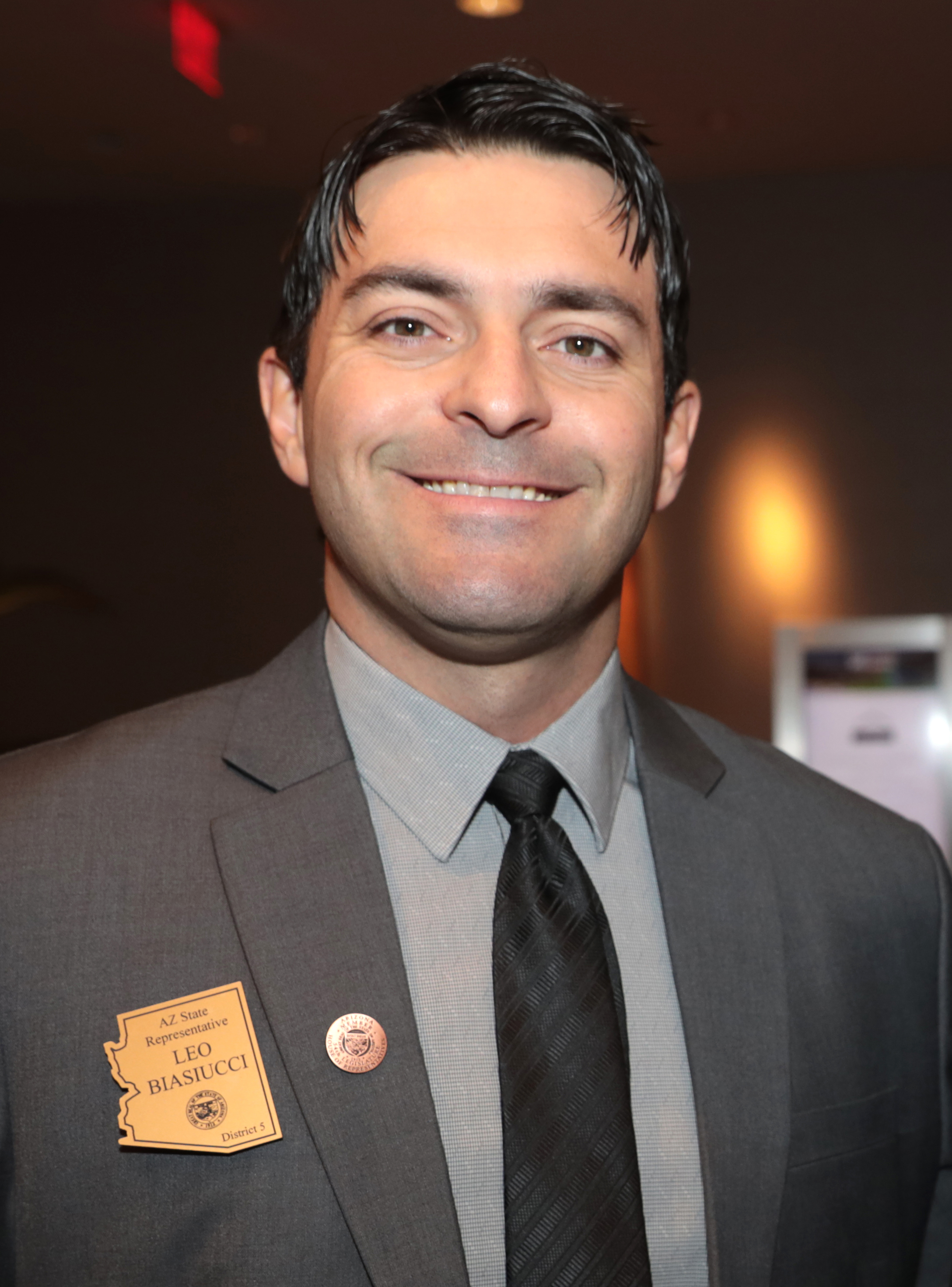
Leo Biasiucci

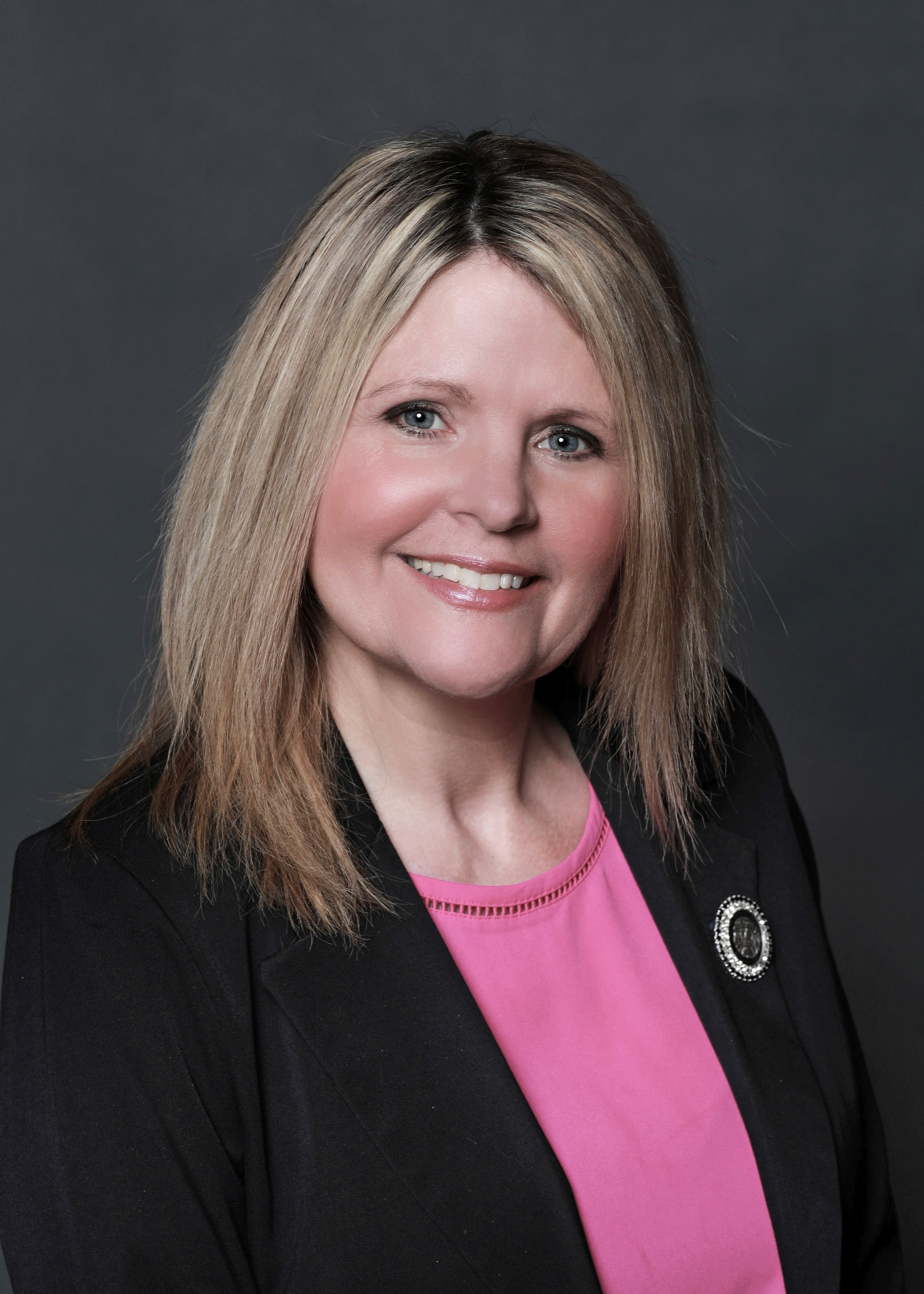
Brooke Boden

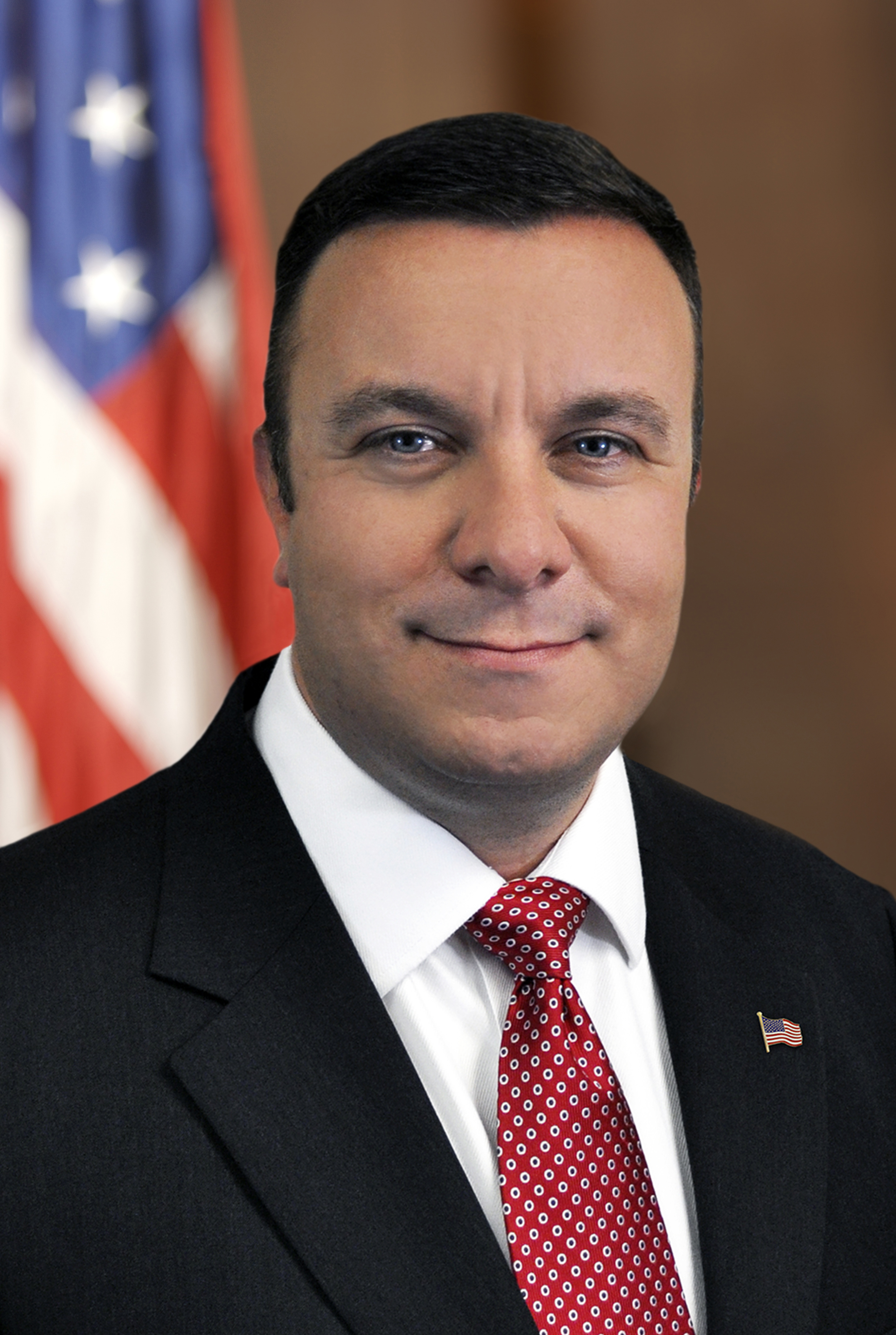
Karl A. Brabenec

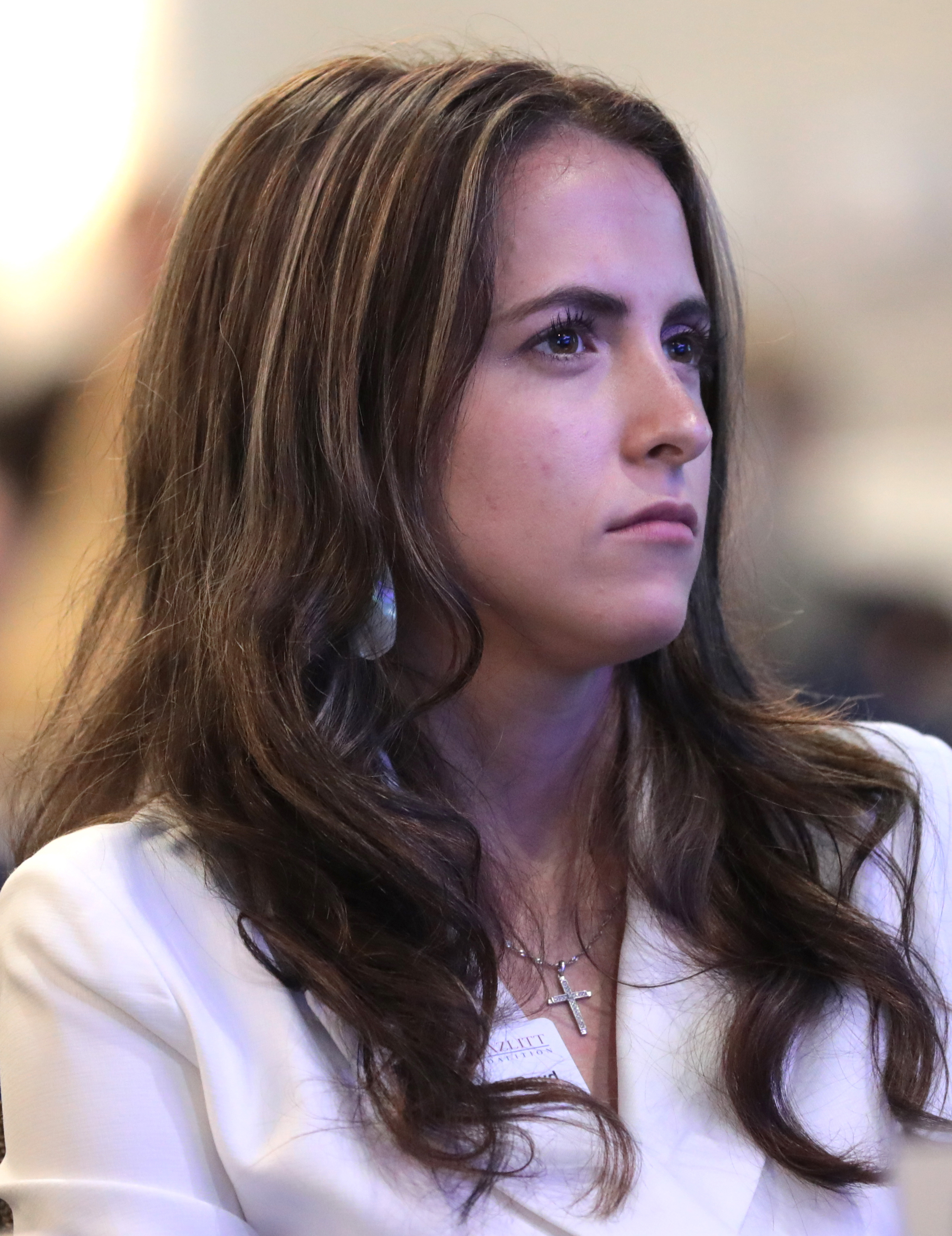
Mazzie Christensen

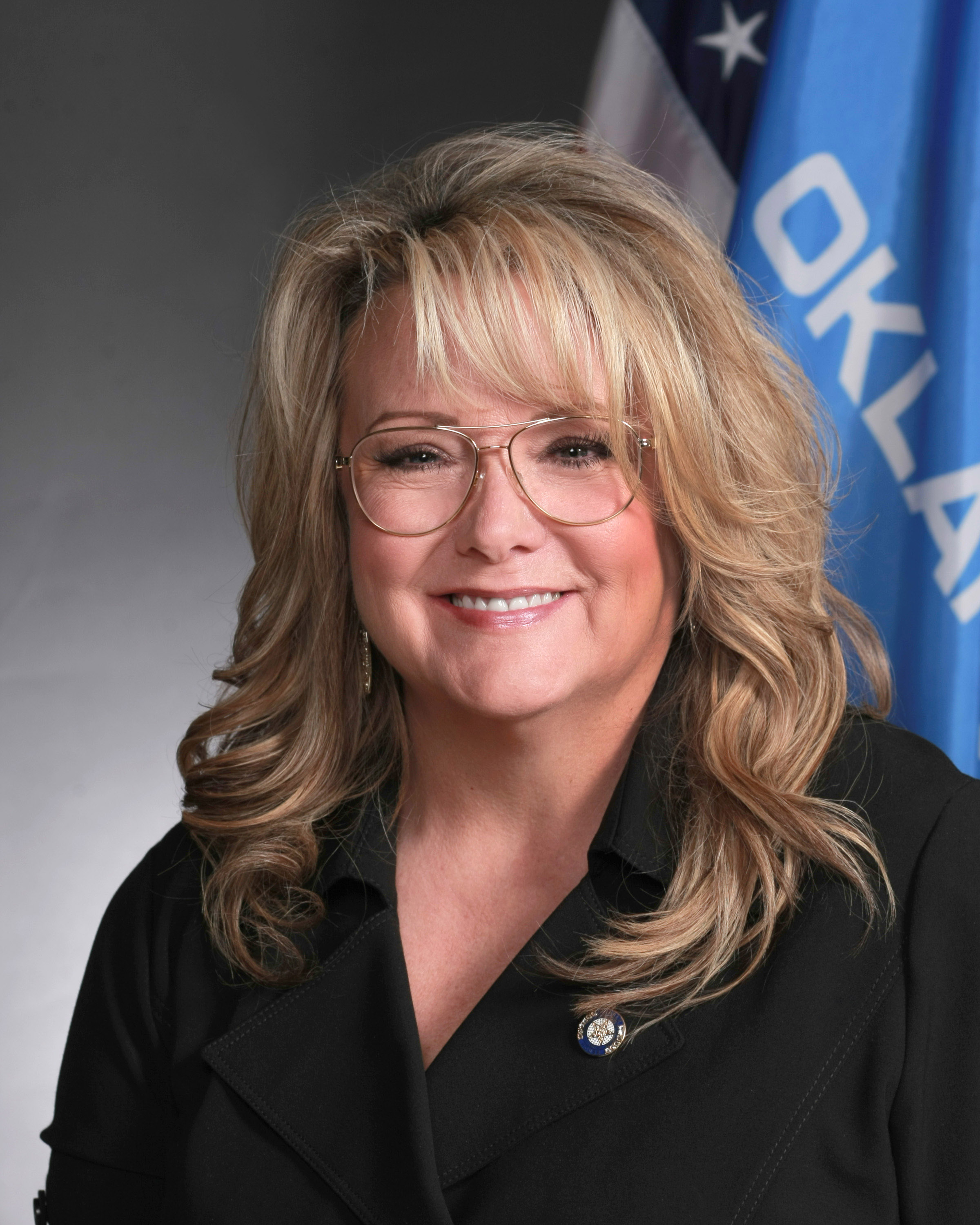
Sherrie Conley

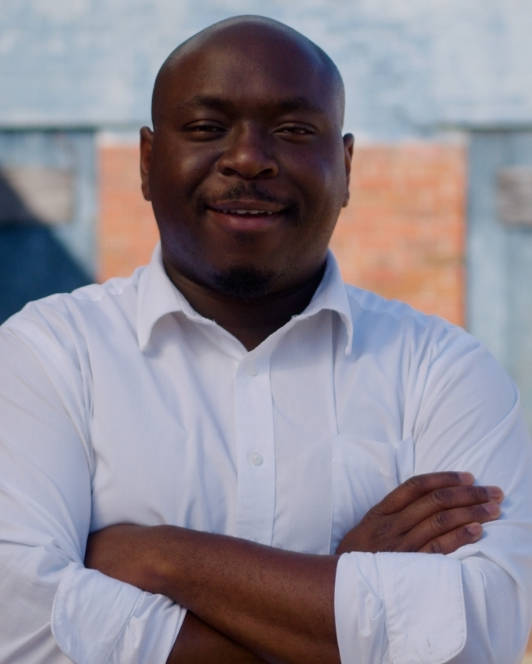
Aijalon Cordoza

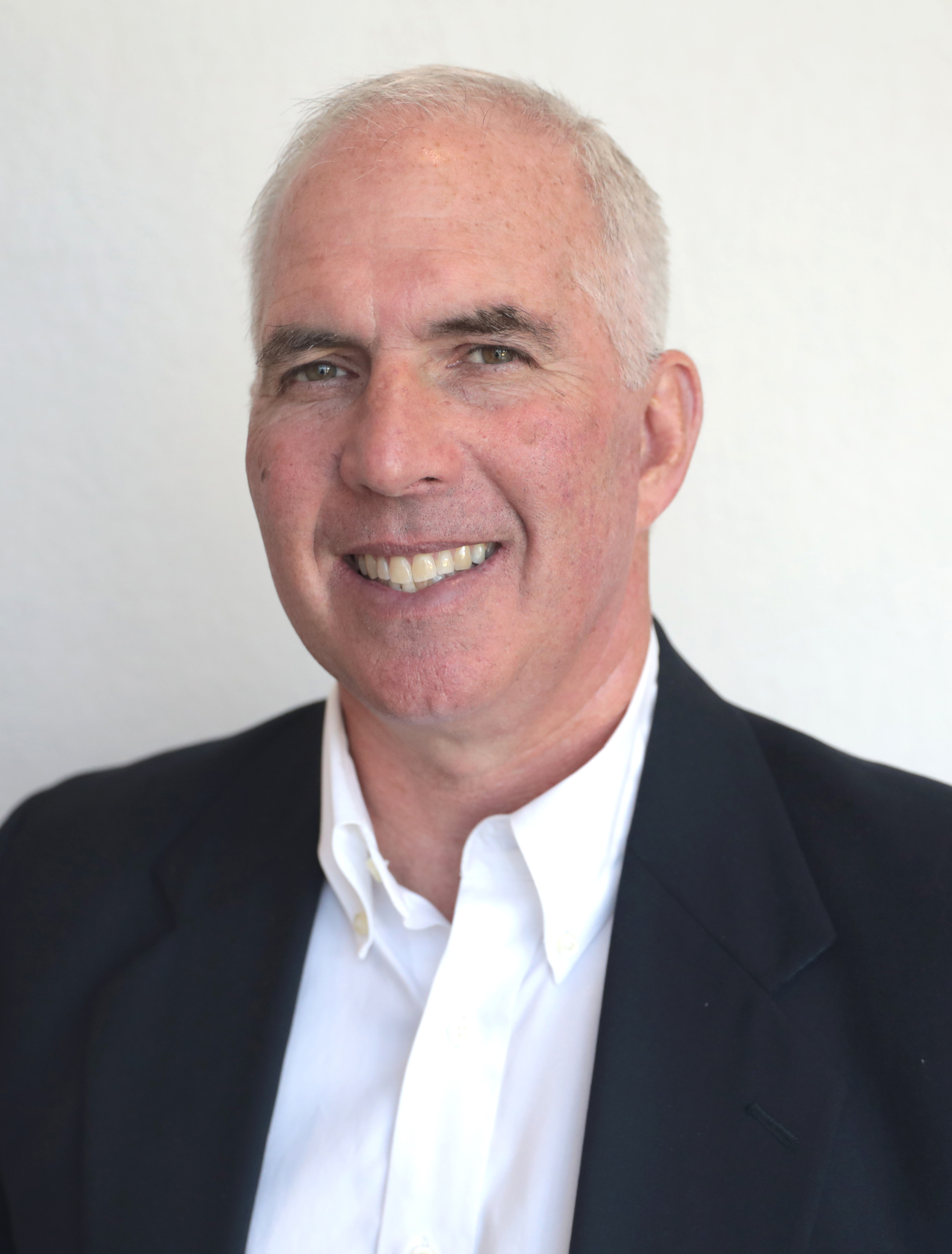
James DeSana

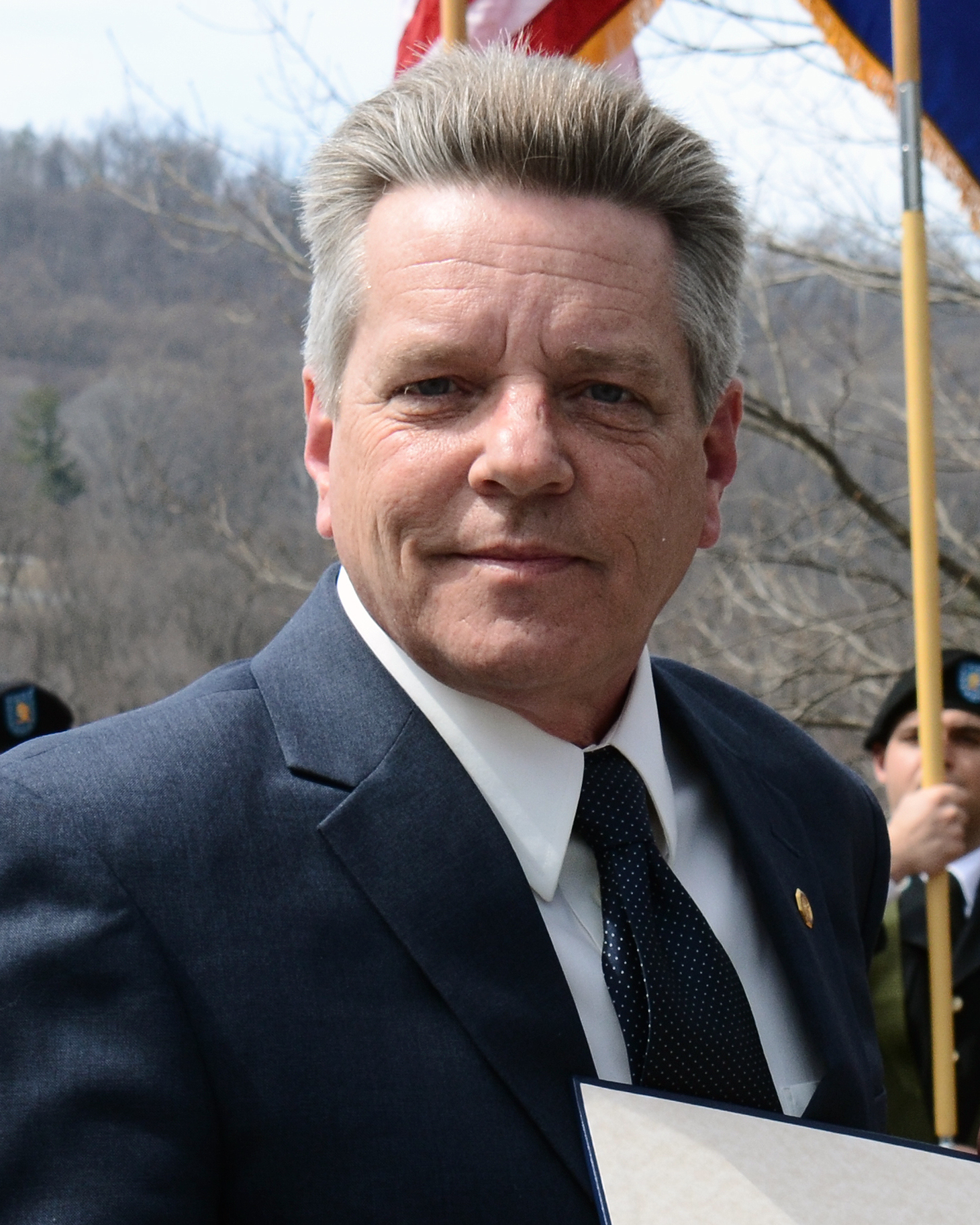
Russ Diamond

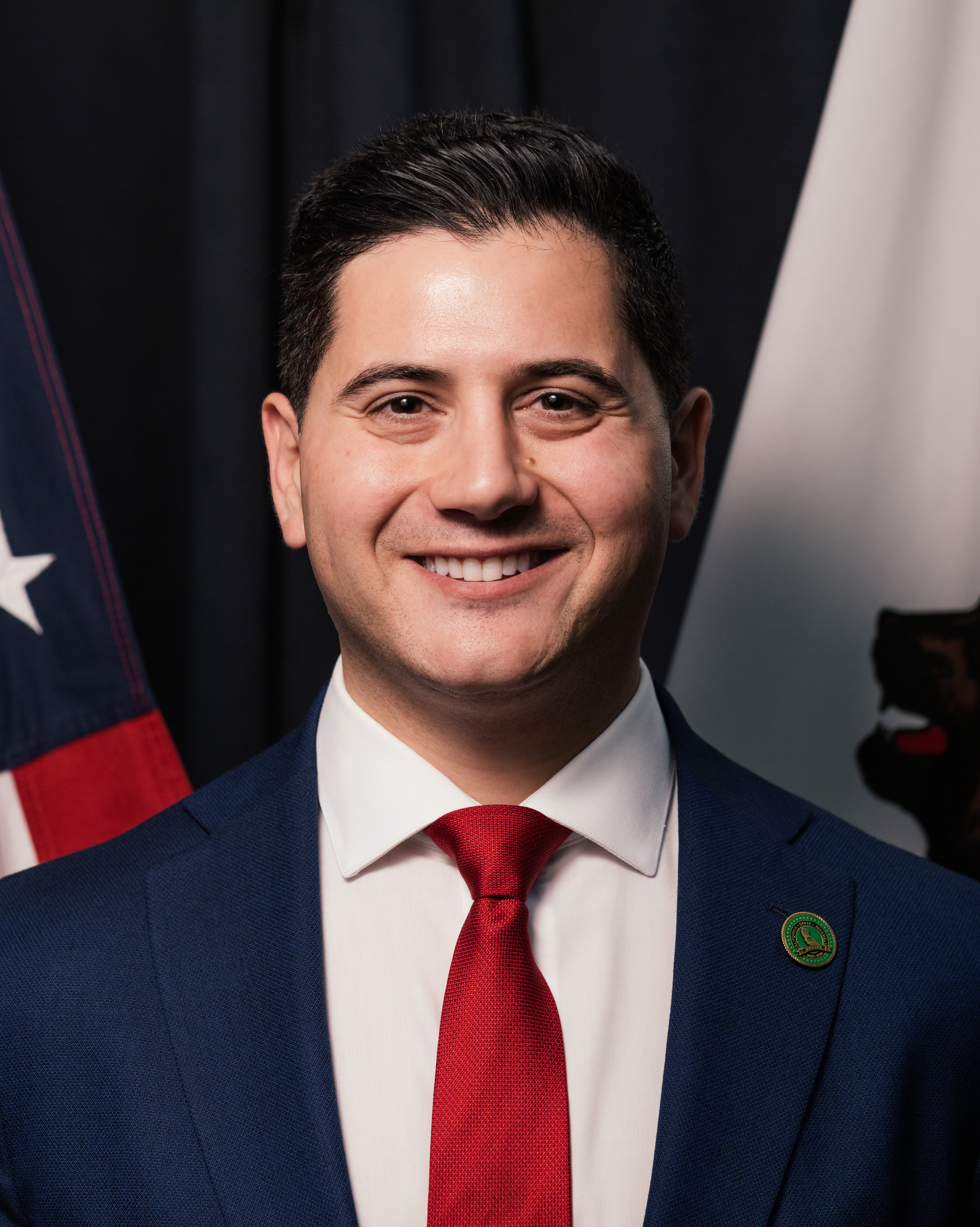
Bill Essayli

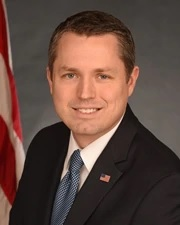
Brian Harrison

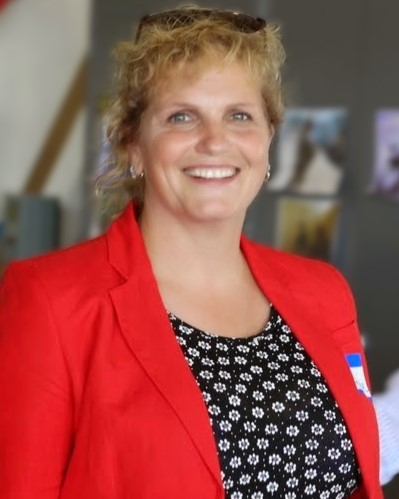
DeLena Johnson

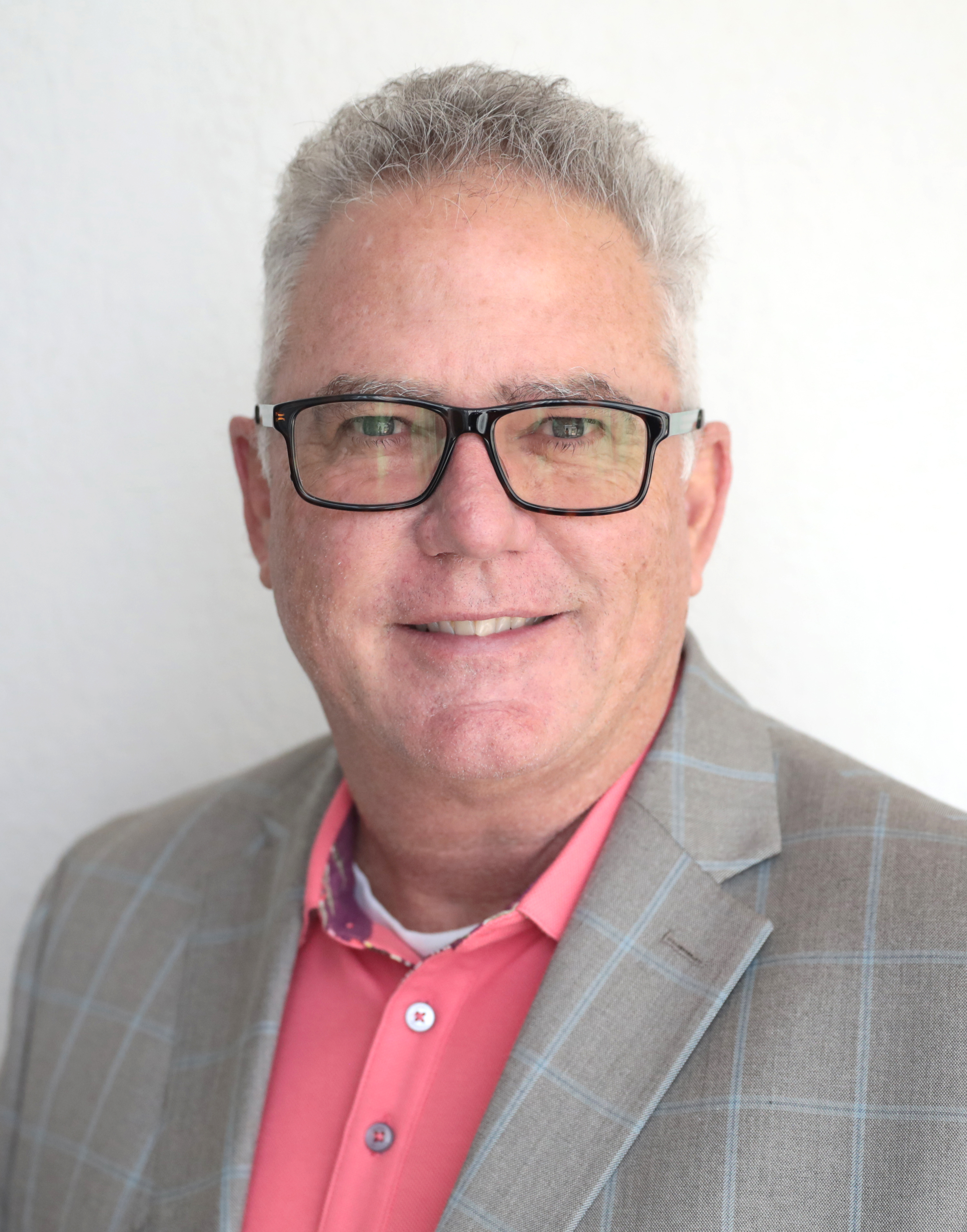
Jay Kilmartin

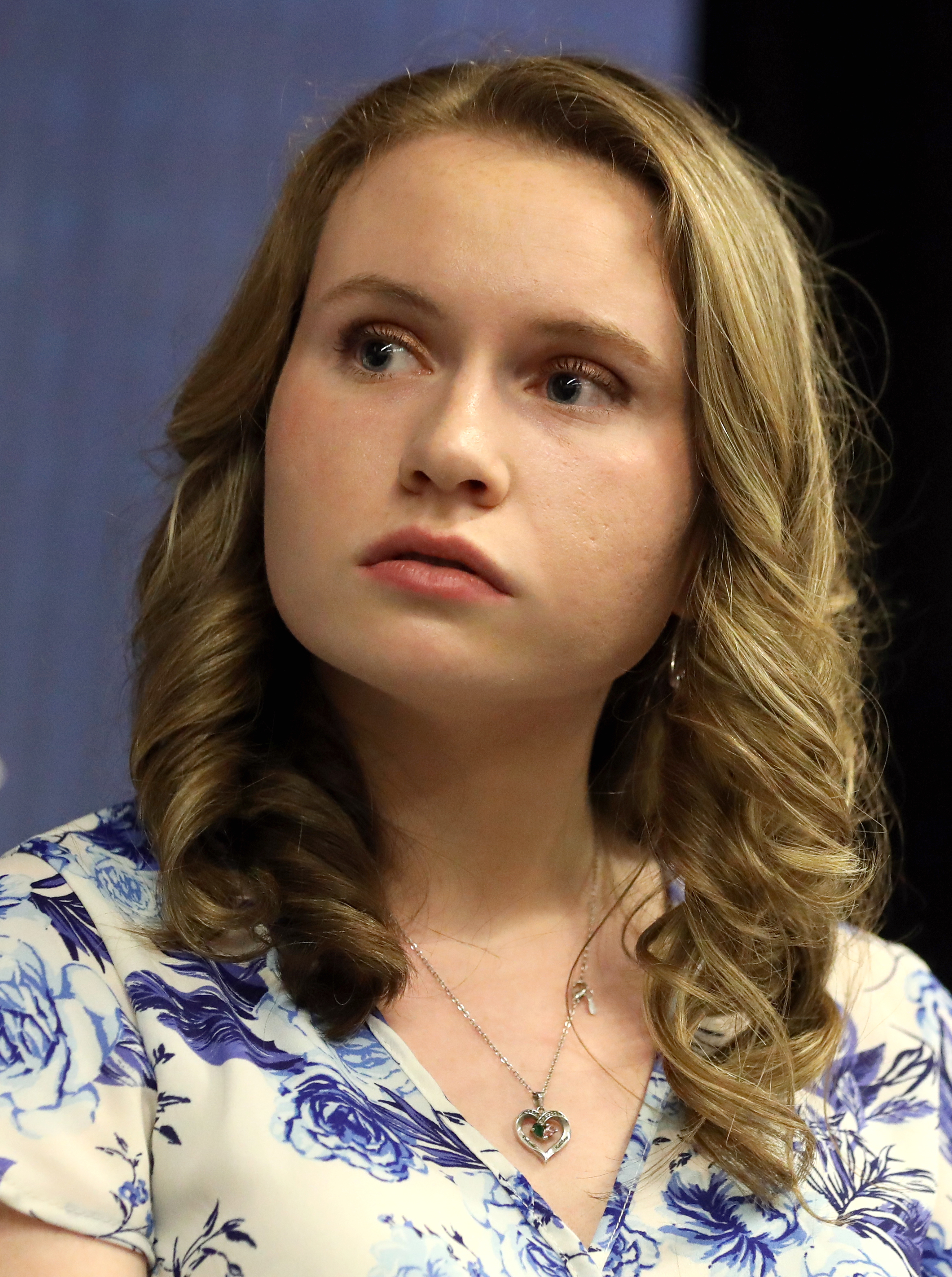
Valerie McDonnell

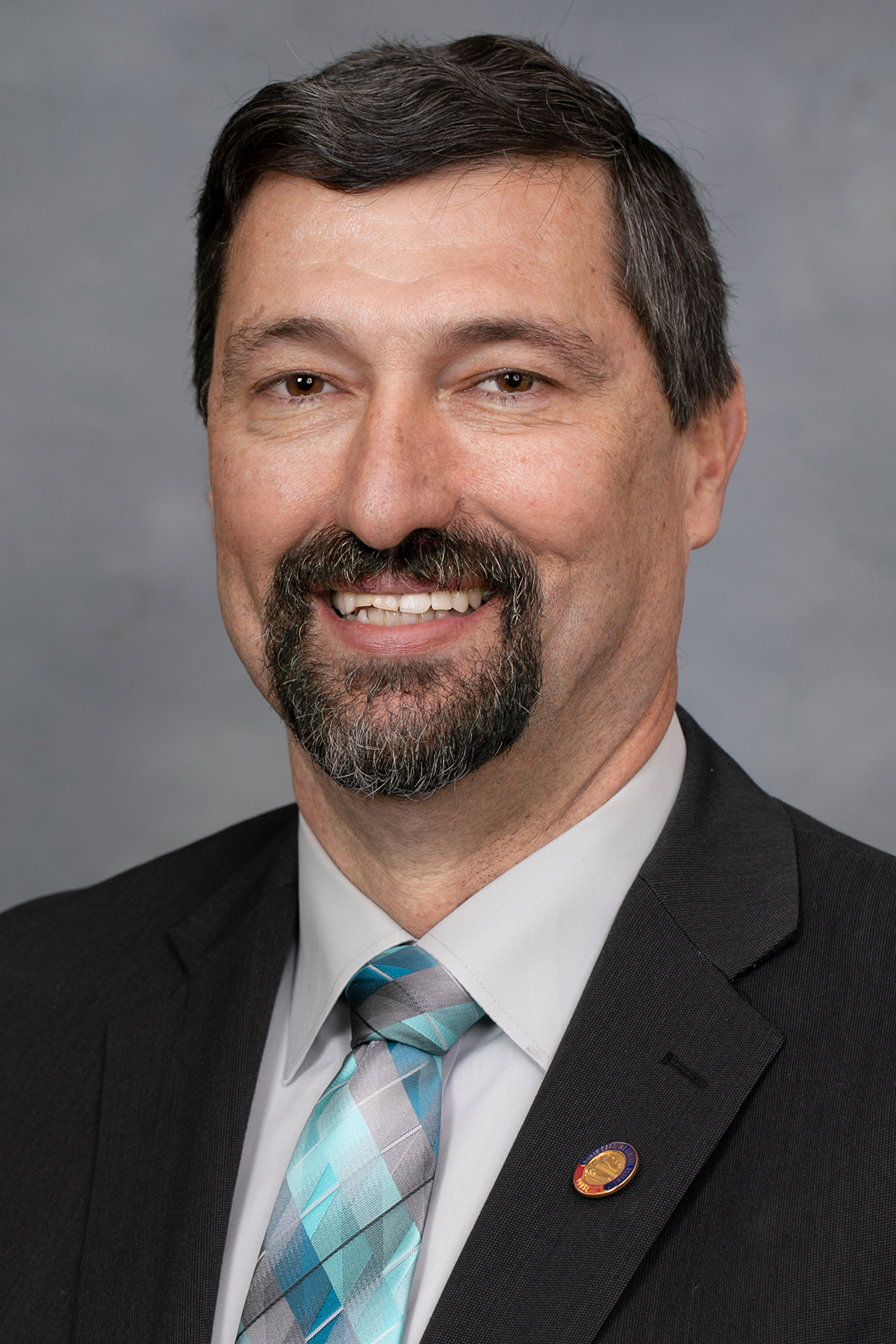
Mark Pless

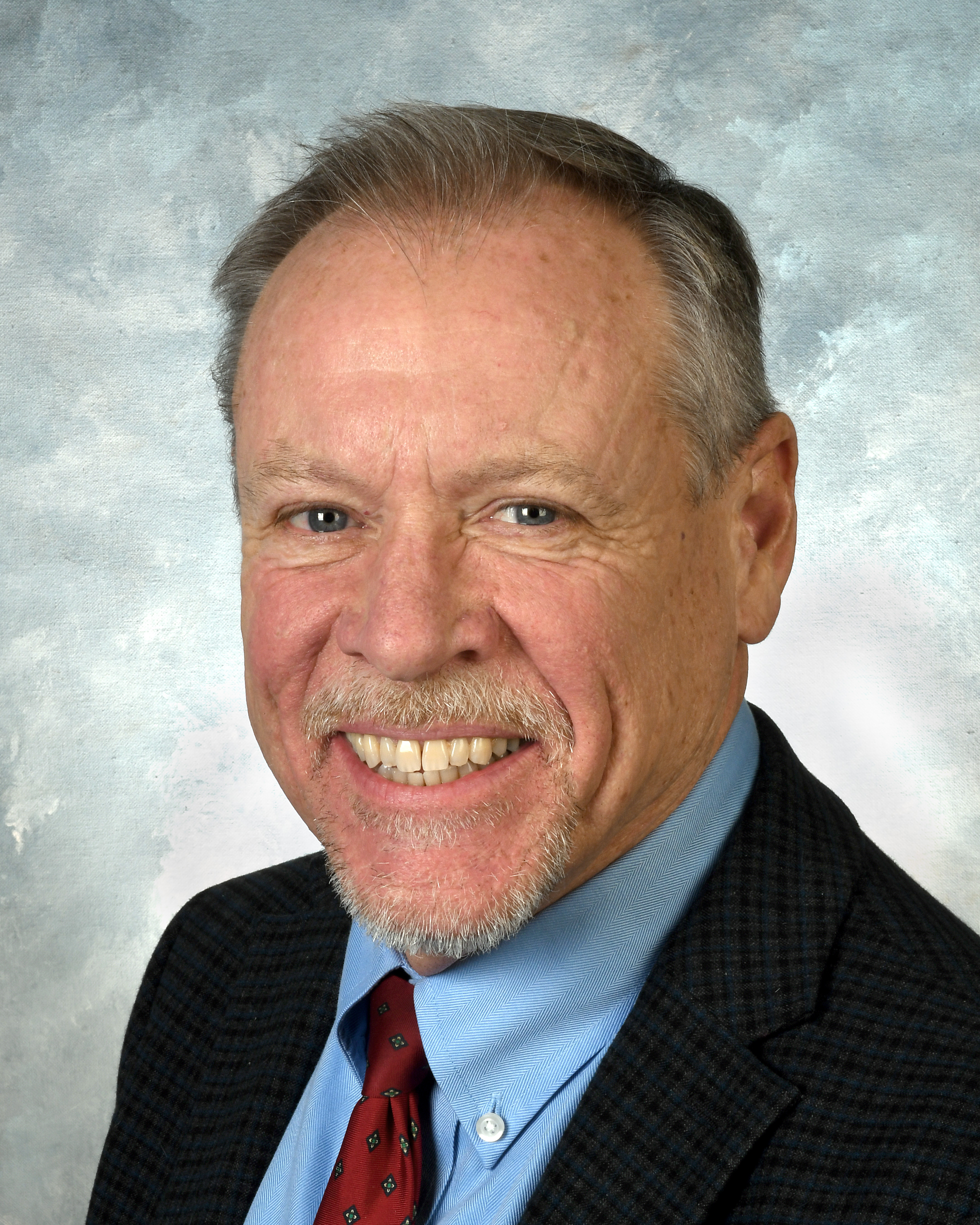
Steve Rawlings

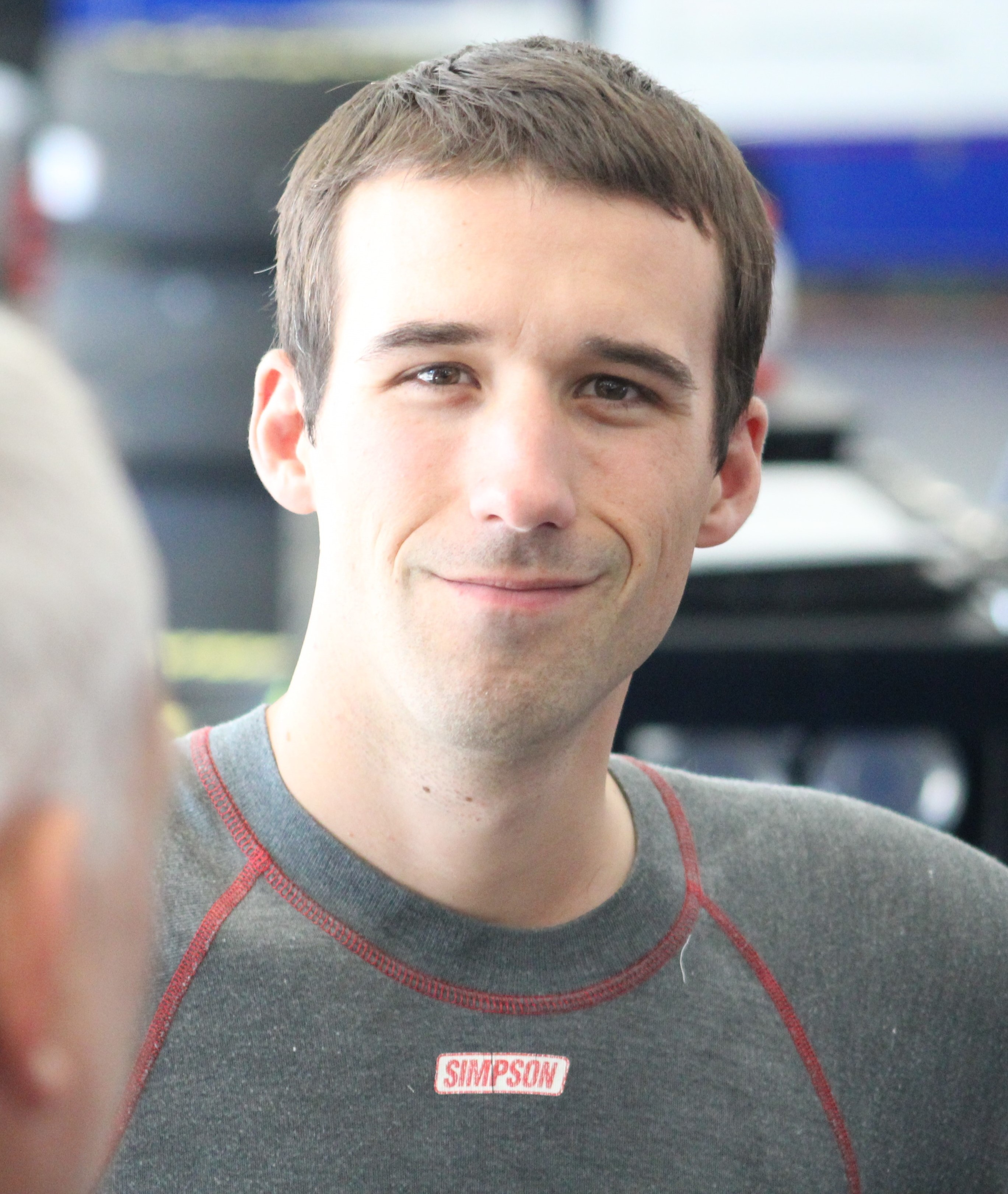
Austin Theriault

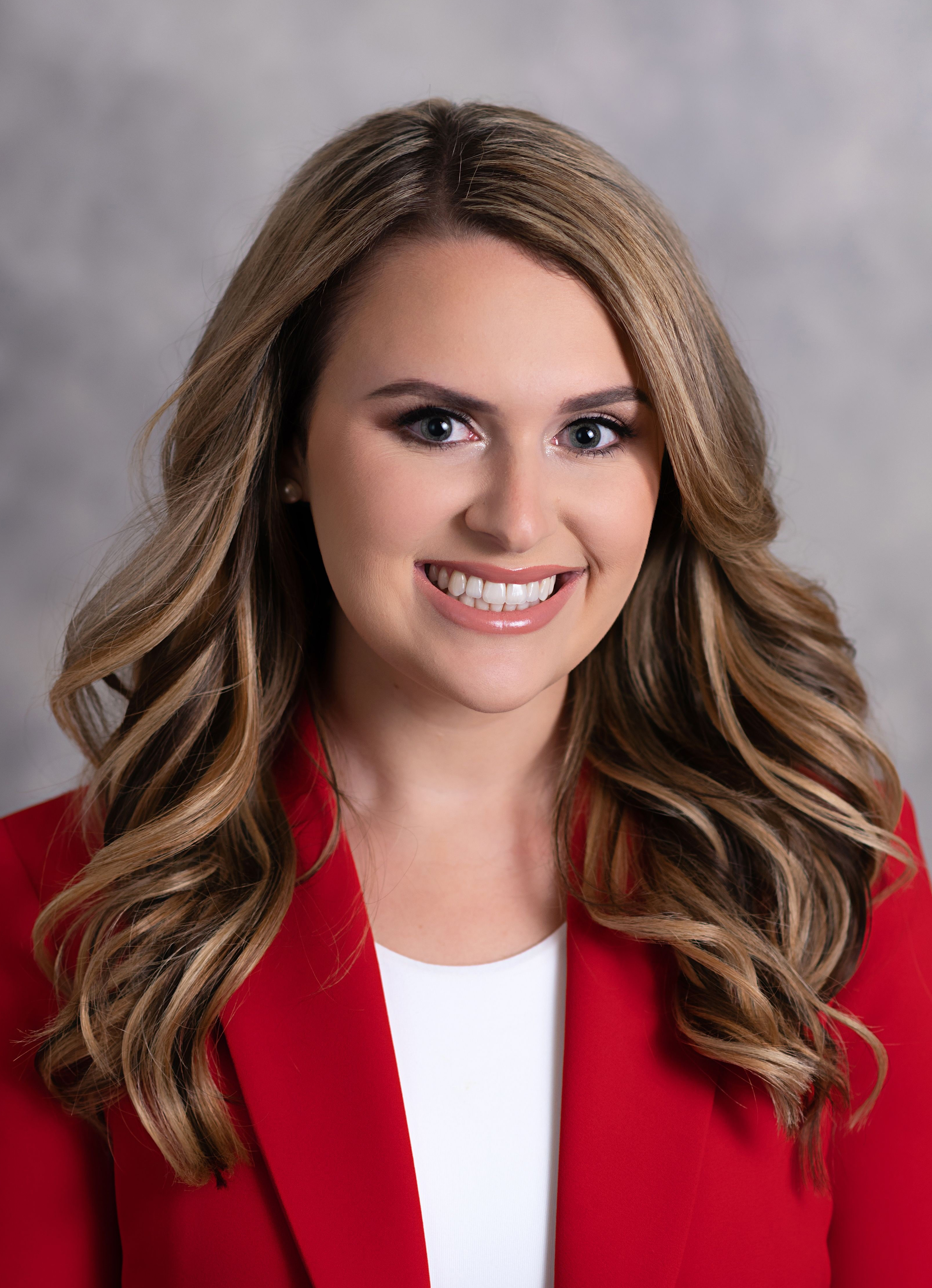
Josie Tomkow

==== Alabama House of Representatives ====
- Mack Butler, 28th district (2022–present), 30th district (2012–2018)

==== Alaska House of Representatives ====
- Jamie Allard, 23rd district (2023–present)
- Ben Carpenter, 8th district (2023–present), 29th district (2019–2023)
- DeLena Johnson, 25th district (2023–present), 11th district (2017–2023)
- George Rauscher, 29th district (2023–present), 9th district (2017–2023)
- Sarah Vance, 6th district (2023–present), 31st district (2019–2023)

==== Arizona House of Representatives ====
- Leo Biasiucci, 30th district (2023–present), 5th district (2019–2023), Majority Leader (2023–present)
- Joseph Chaplik, 3rd district (2023–present), 23rd district (2021–2023)
- John Gillette, 30th district (2023–present)
- Travis Grantham, 14th district (2023–present), 12th district (2017–2023), Speaker pro tempore (2021–present)
- Justin Heap, 10th district (2023–present)
- Rachel Jones, 17th district (2023–present)
- Alexander Kolodin, 3rd district (2023–present)
- David Marshall, 7th district (2023–present)
- Teresa Martinez, 16th district (2023–present), 11th district (2021–2023), Majority Whip (2023–present)
- Cory McGarr, 17th district (2023–present)
- Austin Smith, 29th district (2023–present)
- Ben Toma, 27th district (2023–present), 22nd district (2017–2023), Speaker of the House (2023–present)

==== Arkansas House of Representatives ====
- Steve Hollowell, 37th district (2023–present)
- Jack Ladyman, 32nd district (2023–present), 59th district (2015–2023)
- Robin Lundstrum, 18th district (2023–present), 87th district (2015–2023)
- Mindy McAlindon, 10th district (2023–present)
- Ryan Rose, 48th district (2023–present)
- Matthew Shepherd, 97th district (2023–present), 6th district (2011–2023), Speaker of the House (2018–present)

==== California State Assembly ====
- Bill Essayli, 63rd district (2022–present)
- James Gallagher, 3rd district (2014–present), Minority Leader (2022–present)
- Tri Ta, 70th district (2022–present)

==== Colorado House of Representatives ====
- Gabe Evans, 48th district (2023–present), Republican nominee for U.S. Representative from CO-08 in 2024
- Richard Holtorf, 63rd district (2023–present), 64th district (2019–2023)
- Mike Lynch, Member of the Colorado House of Representatives from the 65th district (2023–2025)
- Rose Pugliese, 14th district (2023–present), Minority Leader (2024–present)

==== Connecticut House of Representatives ====
- Greg Howard, 43rd district (2020–present)
- Joe Hoxha, 78th district (2022–present)
- Cara Pavalock-D'Amato, 77th district (2015–present)

==== Florida House of Representatives ====
- Carolina Amesty, 45th district (2022–present)
- Alex Andrade, 2nd district (2018–present)
- Jessica Baker, 17th district (2022–present)
- Webster Barnaby, 29th district (2022–present), 27th district (2020–2022)
- Fabián Basabe, 106th district (2022–present)
- Mike Beltran, 70th district (2022–present), 57th district (2018–2022)
- Dean Black, 15th district (2022–present)
- David Borrero, 111th district (2022–present), 105th district (2020–2022)
- James Buchanan, 74th district (2018–present)
- Mike Caruso, 87th district (2022–present), 89th district (2018–2022)
- Jennifer Canady, 50th district (2022–present)
- Tom Fabricio, 103rd district (2020–present)
- Randy Fine, 33rd district (2022–present), 53rd district (2016–2022)
- Alina Garcia, 115th district (2022–present)
- Sam Garrison, 18th district (2020–present)
- Jeff Holcomb, 53rd district (2022–present)
- Chip LaMarca, 100th district (2018–present)
- Tom Leek, 25th district (2016–present)
- Toby Overdorf, 85th district (2018–present)
- Daniel Perez, 116th district (2018–present)
- Juan Carlos Porras, 119th district (2022–present)
- Paul Renner, 19th district (2022–present), 24th district (2015–2022), Speaker of the House (2022–present)
- Alex Rizo, 110th district (2020–present)
- Rick Roth, 94th district (2022–present), 85th district (2016–2022)
- Joel Rudman, 3rd district (2022–present)
- Michelle Salzman, 1st district (2022–present)
- John Snyder, 82nd district (2020–present)
- Paula Stark, 47th district (2022–present)
- Kevin Steele, 55th district (2022–present)
- Josie Tomkow, 39th district (2018–present)
- Chase Tramont, 30th district (2022–present)
- Keith Truenow, 26th district (2022–present), 31st district (2018–2022)

==== Georgia House of Representatives ====
- Josh Bonner, 73rd district (2023–present), 72nd district (2017–2023)
- James Burchett, 176th district (2023–present), Majority Whip (2023–present)
- Jon G. Burns, 159th district (2013–present), 157th district (2005–2013), Speaker of the House (2023–present)
- Charlice Byrd, 20th district (2021–present, 2005–2013)
- Chuck Efstration, 104th district (2023–present), Majority Leader (2023–present)
- Ginny Ehrhart, 36th district (2019–present)
- Tim Fleming, 114th district (2023–present)
- Houston Gaines, 120th district (2023–present), 117th district (2019–2023)
- Jan Jones, 47th district (2013–present), 46th district (2005–2013), 38th district (2011–2013), Speaker pro tempore (2010–present)
- Reynaldo Martinez, 111th district (2023–present)
- Mark Newton, 127th district (2023–present), 123rd district (2017–2023)
- Carmen Rice, 139th district (2024–present)
- Gary Richardson, 125th district (2024–present)
- Bruce Williamson, 112th district (2023–present), 115th district (2013–2023), 111th district (2003–2005)

==== Idaho House of Representatives ====
- Judy Boyle, 9b district (2008–present)

==== Illinois House of Representatives ====
- John Cabello, 90th district (2023–present), 68th district (2012–2021)
- Paul Jacobs, 118th district (2023–present), 115th district (2021–2023)
- Charles Meier, 109th district (2023–present), 108th district (2013–2023)
- Chris Miller, 101st district (2023–present), 110th district (2019–2023)
- Adam Niemerg, 102nd district (2023–present), 109th district (2013–2023)
- Blaine Wilhour, 110th district (2023–present), 107th district (2019–2023)

==== Indiana House of Representatives ====
- Mike Speedy, 90th district (2010–present)
- Jake Teshka, 7th district (2020–present)

==== Iowa House of Representatives ====
- Brooke Boden, 21st district (2023–present), 26th district (2021–2023)
- Steve Bradley, 66th district (2023–present), 58th district (2021–2023)
- Mark Cisneros, 96th district (2023–present), 91st district (2021–2023)
- Cindy Golding, 83rd district (2023–present)
- Stan Gustafson, 22nd district (2023–present), 25th district (2014–2023)
- Austin Harris, 26th district (2023–present)
- Heather Hora, 92nd district (2023–present)
- Craig Johnson, 67th district (2023–present)
- Bobby Kaufmann, 82nd district (2023–present), 73rd district (2013–2023)
- Shannon Lundgren, 65th district (2023–present), 57th district (2017–2023)
- Anne Osmundson, 64th district (2023–present), 56th district (2019–2023)
- Mike Sexton, 7th district (2023–present), 10th district (2015–2023)
- Brad Sherman, 91st district (2023–present)
- Luana Stoltenberg, 81st district (2023–present)
- Charley Thomson, 58th district (2023–present)
- Derek Wulf, 76th district (2023–present)

==== Kansas House of Representatives ====
- Steven Howe, 71st district (2021–present)

==== Kentucky House of Representatives ====
- Steve Rawlings, 66th district (2023–present)

==== Louisiana House of Representatives ====
- Michael Bayham, 103rd district (2024–present)
- Beth Anne Billings, 56th district (2024–present)
- Kimberly Coates, 73rd district (2024–present)
- Jason Brian DeWitt, 25th district (2024–present)
- Kathy Edmonston, 88th district (2020–present)
- Julie Emerson, 39th district (2016–present)

==== Maine House of Representatives ====
- Mike Soboleski, 73rd district (2022–present)
- Austin Theriault, 1st district (2022–present), Republican nominee for U.S. Representative from ME-02 in 2024, former NASCAR driver

==== Maryland House of Delegates ====
- Lauren Arikan, district 7B (2023–present), 7th district (2019–2023)
- Christopher Eric Bouchat, 5th district (2023–present)
- Brian Chisholm, 31st district (2023–present), district 31B (2019–2023)
- Barrie Ciliberti, 4th district (2015–present)
- Mark Fisher, district 27C (2015–present), district 27B (2011–2015)
- Robin Grammer Jr., 6th district (2015–present)
- Jefferson L. Ghrist, 36th district (2015–present)
- Tom Hutchinson, district 37B (2023–present)
- Matt Morgan, district 29A (2015–present)
- Richard W. Metzgar, 6th district (2015–present)
- Ryan Nawrocki, district 7A (2023–present)
- Kathy Szeliga, district 7A (2023–present), 7th district (2011–2023), Republican nominee for U.S. Senate in 2016

==== Michigan House of Representatives ====
- Gregory Alexander, 98th district (2023–present)
- Joseph Aragona, 60th district (2023–present)
- Andrew Beeler, 64th district (2023–present), 83rd district (2021–2022)
- Brian BeGole, 71st district (2023–present)
- Bob Bezotte, 50th district (2023–present), 47th district (2021–2022)
- Matthew Bierlein, 97th district (2023–present)
- Ann Bollin, 49th district (2023–present), 42nd district (2021–2022)
- Ken Borton, 105th district (2021–present)
- William Bruck, 30th district (2023–present)
- Steve Carra, 36th district (2023–present), 59th district (2021–2022)
- Cam Cavitt, 106th district (2023–present)
- Jay DeBoyer, 63rd district (2023–present)
- James DeSana, 29th district (2023–present)
- Joseph Fox, 101st district (2023–present)
- Neil Friske, 107th district (2023–present)
- Phil Green, 67th district (2023–present), 84th district (2019–2022)
- Jaime Greene, 65th district (2023–present)
- Matt Hall, 49th district (2023–present), 63rd district (2019–2022), Minority Leader (2023–present)
- Mike Harris, 52nd district (2023–present), 43rd district (2022)
- Mike Hoadley, 99th district (2023–present)
- Gina Johnsen, 78th district (2023–present)
- Tom Kunse, 100th district (2023–present)
- Sarah Lightner, 45th district (2023–present), 65th district (2019–2022)
- Matt Maddock, 51st district (2023–present), 44th district (2019–2022)
- Gregory Markkanen, 110th district (2019–present)
- Luke Meerman, 89th district (2023–present), 88th district (2019–2022)
- Jerry Neyer, 92nd district (2023–present)
- Pat Outman, 91st district (2023–present), 70th district (2021–2022)
- Bryan Posthumus, 90th district (2023–present), 73rd district (2021–2022)
- David Prestin, 108th district (2023–present)
- Angela Rigas, 79th district (2023–present)
- John Roth, 104th district (2021–present)
- Josh Schriver, 66th district (2023–present)
- Bill G. Schuette, 95th district (2023–present)
- Rachelle Smit, 43rd district (2023–present)
- Alicia St. Germaine, 62nd district (2023–present)
- Mark Tisdel, 55th district (2023–present), 45th district (2021–2022)
- Jamie Thompson, 28th district (2023–present)
- Pauline Wendzel, 39th district (2023–present), 79th district (2019–2022)
- Doug Wozniak, 59th district (2023–present), 36th district (2019–2021)
- Dale Zorn, 34th district (2023–present), 56th district (2011–2015)

==== Minnesota House of Representatives ====
- Ben Davis, 6A district (2023–present)
- Lisa Demuth, 13A district (2019–present), Minority Leader (2023–present)
- Bernie Perryman, 14A district (2023–present)

==== Mississippi House of Representatives ====
- William Tracy Arnold, 3rd district (2012–present)
- Charles Blackwell, 88th district (2024–present)
- Andy Boyd, 37th district (2022–present)
- Randy Phillip Boyd, 19th district (2012–present)
- Billy Adam Calvert, 83rd district (2020–present)
- Lester Carpenter, 1st district (2008–present)
- Becky Currie, 92nd district (2008–present)
- Dan Eubanks, 25th district (2016–present)
- Jeff Hale, 24th district (2016–present)
- Rodney Hall, 20th district (2024–present)
- Stacey Hobgood-Wilkes, 108th district (2017–present)
- Stephen Horne, 81st district (2004–present)
- Timmy Ladner, 93rd district (2012–present)
- Vince Mangold, 53rd district (2016–present)
- Brad Mattox, 2nd district (2024–present)
- Jay McKnight, 95th district (2020–present)
- Bill Pigott, 99th district (2008–present)
- Kimberly Remak, 7th district (2024–present)
- Randy Rushing, 78th district (2012–present)
- Troy Smith, 84th district (2020–present)
- Mark Tullos, 79th district (2016–present)
- Lance Varner, 62nd district (2024–present)
- Price Wallace, 77th district (2018–present)

==== Missouri House of Representatives ====
- Ben Baker, 160th district (2019–present)
- Hardy Billington, 152nd district (2019–present)
- Mitch Boggs, 157th district (2021–present)
- Bob Bromley, 162nd district (2019–present)
- Jamie Burger, 148th district (2021–present)
- Danny Busick, 3rd district (2019–present)
- Tricia Byrnes, 63rd district (2019–present)
- David Casteel, 97th district (2023–present)
- Mazzie Christensen, 2nd district (2023–present)
- Phil Christofanelli, 104th district (2023–present), 105th district (2017–2023)
- Jeff Coleman, 32nd district (2019–present)
- Bennie Cook, 142nd district (2021–present)
- Scott Cupps, 158th district (2020–present)
- Dane Diehl, 125th district (2023–present)
- Chris Dinkins, 144th district (2018–present)
- Jeff Farnan, 1st district (2023–present)
- Jamie Gragg, 140th district (2023–present)
- Kurtis Gregory, 51st district (2021–present)
- Mike Haffner, 55th district (2019–present)
- Bill Hardwick, 121st district (2021–present)
- Wendy Hausman, 65th district (2023–present)
- Mike Henderson, 117th district (2017–present), Speaker pro tempore (2023–present)
- Justin Hicks, 108th district (2023–present)
- Barry Hovis, 146th district (2019–present)
- Brad Hudson, 138th district (2019–present)
- Holly Jones, 88th district (2023–present)
- Jim Kalberloh, 126th district (2021–present)
- Ann Kelley, 127th district (2019–present)
- Chris Lonsdale, 38th district (2023–present)
- Don Mayhew, 124th district (2019–present)
- Mike McGirl, 118th district (2019–present)
- Aaron McMullen, 20th district (2023–present)
- Jim Murphy, 94th district (2019–present)
- Jeff Myers, 42nd district (2021–present)
- Chad Perkins, 40th district (2021–present)
- Tara Peters, 122nd district (2023–present)
- Dean Plocher, 89th district (2016–present), Speaker of the House (2023–present)
- Brad Pollitt, 52nd district (2019–present)
- Sean Pouche, 13th district (2021–present)
- Roger Reedy, 57th district (2019–present)
- Doug Richey, 39th district (2023–present), 38th district (2019–2023)
- Chris Sander, 33rd district (2021–present)
- Bruce Sassmann, 61st district (2023–present), 62nd district (2021–2023)
- Adam Schnelting, 69th district (2023–present), 104th district (2019–2023)
- Jim Schulte, 49th district (2023–present)
- Adam Schwadron, 105th district (2021–present)
- Brian Seitz, 156th district (2023–present)
- Cody Smith, 163rd district (2017–present)
- Travis Smith, 155th district (2021–present)
- Justin Sparks, 110th district (2023–present)
- Dan Stacy, 31st district (2016–present)
- Lisa Thomas, 123rd district (2021–present)
- Bob Titus, 139th district (2023–present)
- Cheri Toalson Reisch, 44th district (2017–present)
- Ken Waller, 114th district (2023–present)
- Richard West, 102nd district (2023–present)

==== Montana House of Representatives ====
- William W. Mercer, 46th district (2021–present), Acting U.S. Associate Attorney General (2006–2007) and U.S. Attorney for the District of Montana (2001–2009)
- Braxton Mitchell, 3rd district (2021–present)

==== Nevada Assembly ====
- Ken Gray, 39th district (2022–present)
- Alexis Hansen, 32nd district (2018–present)
- Toby Yurek, 19th district (2022–present)

==== New Hampshire House of Representatives ====
- Kimberly Abare, Hillsborough 1st district (2022–present)
- Louise Andrus, Merrimack 5th district (2022–present), Merrimack 1st district (2020–2022)
- Glenn Bailey, Strafford 2nd district (2022–present), Strafford 1st district (2020–2022)
- Harry Bean, Belknap 6th district (2022–present), Belknap 2nd district (2018–2022)
- Jacob Brouillard, Rockingham 2nd district (2022–present)
- Claudine Burnham, Strafford 2nd district (2022–present)
- Tim Cahill, Rockingham 4th district (2022–present)
- Jose Cambrils, Merrimack 4th district (2022–present), Merrimack 9th district (2020–2022)
- Fred Doucette, Rockingham 25th district (2022–present), Rockingham 8th district (2014–2022)
- Ron Dunn, Rockingham 16th district (2022–present)
- Tracy Emerick, Rockingham 29th district (2022–present), Rockingham 21st district (2020–2022, 2012–2018)
- Keith Erf, Hillsborough 28th district (2022–present), Hillsborough 2nd district (2018–2022)
- Larry Gagne, Hillsborough 16th district (2022–present), Hillsborough 13th district (2008–2022)
- Ted Gorski, Hillsborough 2nd district (2022–present), Hillsborough 7th district (2020–2022)
- Gerald Griffin, Hillsborough 42nd district (2022–present), Hillsborough 5th district (2020–2022, 2016–2018)
- Juliet Harvey-Bolia, Belknap 3rd district (2022–present), Belknap 4th district (2020–2022)
- Gregory Hill, Merrimack 2nd district (2022–present), Merrimack 3rd district (2014–2022), Merrimack 6th district (2010–2012)
- Thomas Kaczynski Jr., Strafford 5th district (2022–present), Strafford 22nd district (2020–2022, 2014–2018)
- Phyllis Katsakiores, Rockingham 13th district (2022–present, 1992–2002), Rockingham 6th district (2014–2022), Rockingham 5th district (2002–2012), Rockingham 7th district (1982–1992)
- Diane Kelley, Hillsborough 32nd district (2022–present), Hillsborough 25th district (2020–2022)
- Stephen Kennedy, Hillsborough 13th district (2022–present)
- Aboul Khan, Rockingham 30th district (2022–present), Rockingham 20th district (2016–2022, 2014–2016)
- Jim Kofalt, Hillsborough 32nd district (2022–present), Hillsborough 4th district (2020–2022)
- John Leavitt, Merrimack 10th district (2022–present), Merrimack 24th district (2016–2022)
- Valerie McDonnell, Rockingham 25th district (2022–present)
- Nikki McCarter, Belknap 8th district (2022–present)
- Charles Melvin, Rockingham 20th district (2022–present), Rockingham 15th district (2018–2022)
- Sandra Panek, Hillsborough 1st district (2022–present)
- Joseph Pitre, Strafford 1st district (2022–present), Strafford 2nd district (2012–2022)
- Tom Ploszaj, Belknap 1st district (2020–present)
- John Potucek, Rockingham 13th district (2022–present), Rockingham 6th district (2018–2022, 2014–2016)
- Kevin Pratt, Rockingham 4th district (2022–present), Rockingham 3rd district (2018–2022)
- Arlene Quaratiello, Rockingham 18th district (2022–present)
- Andrew Renzullo, Hillsborough 13th district (2022–present), Hillsborough 37th district (2016–2022, 2012–2014), Hillsborough 27th district (2004–2012)
- Terry Roy, Rockingham 31st district (2022–present), Rockingham 32nd district (2018–2022)
- John Sellers, Grafton 18th district (2022–present)
- Vanessa Sheehan, Hillsborough 43rd district (2022–present), Hillsborough 23rd district (2020–2022)
- Lisa Smart, Belknap 2nd district (2022–present)
- James Spillane, Rockingham 2nd district (2014–present)
- Jonathan Stone, Sullivan 8th district (2022–present)
- James Summers, Rockingham 20th district (2022–present), Hillsborough 26th district (2010–2012)
- Jeffrey Tenczar, Hillsborough 1st district (2022–present)
- Paul Terry, Belknap 7th district (2022–present), Belknap 5th district (2020–2022)
- Dick Thackston, Cheshire 12th district (2022–present)
- Scott Wallace, Rockingham 8th district (2022–present), Rockingham 12th district (2018–2022), Rockingham 33rd district (2016–2018)
- Lilli Walsh, Rockingham 15th district (2022–present)
- Kenneth Weyler, Rockingham 14th district (2022–present), Rockingham 13th district (2012–2022), Rockingham 8th district (2010–2012, 2004–2008), Rockingham 79th district (2002–2004), Rockingham 18th district (1992–2002), Rockingham 10th district (1990–1992)
- Robert Wherry, Hillsborough 13th district (2022–present)
- Clayton Wood, Merrimack 13th district (2022–present)

==== New Jersey General Assembly ====
- Robert Auth, 39th district (2014–present)
- Dawn Fantasia, 24th district (2024–present)
- Mike Inganamort, 24th district (2024–present)
- Paul Kanitra, 10th district (2024–present)

==== New Mexico House of Representatives ====
- James G. Townsend, 54th district (2015–present), Minority Leader (2024, 2019–2023)

==== New York State Assembly ====
- William A. Barclay, 120th district (2003–present), Minority Leader (2020–present)
- Jake Blumencranz, 15th district (2023–present)
- Karl A. Brabenec, 98th district (2014–present), Minority Whip (2023–present)
- Alec Brook-Krasny, 46th district (2023–present, 2006–2015)
- Michael Norris, 144th district (2017–present)
- Michael Novakhov, 45th district (2023–present)
- Sam Pirozzolo, 63rd district (2023–present)
- Christopher Tague, 102nd district (2018–present)
- Michael Tannousis, 64th district (2021–present)

==== North Carolina House of Representatives ====
- Allen Chesser, 25th district (2023–present)
- Mike Clampitt, 119th district (2021–present, 2017–2019)
- Karl Gillespie, 120th district (2021–present)
- Neal Jackson, 78th district (2023–present)
- Jarrod Lowery, 47th district (2023–present)
- Tim Moore, 111th district (2003–present), Speaker of the House (2015–present), Republican nominee for U.S. Representative from NC-14 in 2024
- Mark Pless, 118th district (2021–present)

==== North Dakota House of Representatives ====
- Claire Cory, 42nd district (2019–present)
- Matthew Heilman, 7th district (2022–present)
- Emily O'Brien, 42nd district (2016–present)
- Brandon Prichard, 8th district (2022–present)
- Steve Vetter, 18th district (2016–present)

==== Ohio House of Representatives ====
- Cindy Abrams, 29th district (2019–present)
- Gary Click, 88th district (2021–present)
- Jon Cross, 83rd district (2019–present)
- Jay Edwards, 94th district (2017–present)
- Ron Ferguson, 96th district (2021–present)
- Jennifer Gross, 45th district (2021–present)
- Thomas Hall, 46th district (2023–present), 53rd district (2021–2022)
- Derek Merrin, 42nd district (2023–present), 47th district (2016–2022)
- Melanie Miller, 67th district (2023–present)
- Monica Robb Blasdel, 79th district (2023–present)
- Jason Stephens, 93rd district (2019–present), Speaker of the House (2023–present)
- Brian Stewart, 12th district (2023–present), 78th district (2021–2022)
- D. J. Swearingen, 89th district (2019–present)
- Josh Williams, 41st district (2023–present)

==== Oklahoma House of Representatives ====
- Chris Banning, 24th district (2022–present)
- Sherrie Conley, 20th district (2018–present)
- Jon Echols, 90th district (2012–present), Majority Leader (2017–present)
- Tom Gann, 8th district (2016–present)
- Jim Grego, 17th district (2018–present)
- David Hardin, 86th district (2018–present)
- Neil Hays, 13th district (2022–present)
- Brian Hill, 47th district (2019–present)
- Justin Humphrey, 19th district (2017–present)
- Cody Maynard, 21st district (2022–present)
- Kevin McDugle, 12th district (2016–present)
- Terry O'Donnell, 23rd district (2013–present), Speaker pro tempore (2021–2022)
- David Smith, 18th district (2018–present)
- Clay Staires, 66th district (2022–present)
- Jay Steagall, 43rd district (2018–present)
- Danny Williams, 28th district (2020–present)

==== Oregon House of Representatives ====
- Court Boice, 1st district (2023–present)
- Christine Goodwin, 4th district (2023–present), 2nd district (2021–2023)
- Jeff Helfrich, 52nd district (2023–present, 2017–2019), Minority Leader (2023–present)
- Virgle Osborne, 2nd district (2023–present)

==== Rhode Island House of Representatives ====
- Sherry Roberts, 29th district (2015–present)

==== Pennsylvania House of Representatives ====
- Jake Banta, 4th district (2023–present)
- Timothy R. Bonner, 17th district (2023–present), 8th district (2020–2023)
- Mike Cabell, 117th district (2022–present)
- Bryan Cutler, 100th district (2007–present), Minority Leader (2023–present)
- Eric Davanzo, 58th district (2020–present)
- Russ Diamond, 102nd district (2015–present)
- Josh Kail, 15th district (2019–present)
- Milou Mackenzie, 131st district (2021–present)
- Ryan Mackenzie, 187th district (2012–present), Republican nominee for U.S. Representative from PA-07 in 2024
- Zach Mako, 183rd district (2017–present)
- Rob Mercuri, 28th district (2021–present), Republican nominee for U.S. Representative from PA-17 in 2024
- Marci Mustello, 11th district (2019–present)
- Leslie Rossi, 59th district (2021–present)

==== House of Representatives of Puerto Rico ====
- Carlos Johnny Méndez, 36th district (2005–present), Minority Leader (2021–present), Speaker of the House (2017–2021) (New Progressive)

==== South Carolina House of Representatives ====
- William Bailey, 104th district (2018–present)
- Bruce Bannister, 24th district (2006–present)
- Thomas Beach, 10th district (2022–present)
- Gary Brewer, 114th district (2022–present)
- Case Brittain, 107th district (2020–present)
- Mike Burns, 17th district (2013–present)
- Don Chapman, 8th district (2022–present)
- Bill Chumley, 35th district (2011–present)
- Bobby Cox, 21st district (2018–present)
- Brandon Cox, 92nd district (2022–present)
- Heather Ammons Crawford, 68th district (2012–present)
- Sylleste Davis, 100th district (2016–present)
- Jason Elliot, 22nd district (2016–present)
- Shannon Erickson, 124th district (2006–present)
- Cal Forrest, 39th district (2016–present)
- Daniel Gibson, 12th district (2022–present)
- Doug Gilliam, 42nd district (2018–present)
- Thomas Val Guest, 106th district (2022–present)
- Brandon Guffey, 48th district (2023–present)
- Patrick Haddon, 19th district (2019–present)
- Bill Hager, 122nd district (2022–present)
- Kevin Hardee, 105th district (2012–present)
- Rob Harris, 36th district (2022–present)
- Bill Herbkersman, 118th district (2002–present)
- Lee Hewitt, 108th district (2016–present)
- Davey Hiott, 4th district (2005–present), Majority Leader (2022–present)
- Bill Hixon, 83rd district (2010–present)
- Jeff Johnson, 58th district (2014–present)
- Stewart Jones, 14th district (2019–present)
- Jay Jordan, 63rd district (2015–present)
- Jay Kilmartin, 85th district (2022–present)
- Brian Lawson, 30th district (2022–present)
- Matt Leber, 116th district (2022–present)
- Randy Ligon, 43rd district (2018–present)
- Steven Wayne Long, 37th district (2016–present)
- Phillip Lowe, 60th district (2006–present)
- Josiah Magnuson, 38th district (2016–present)
- RJ May, 88th district (2020–present)
- Ryan McCabe, 96th district (2020–present)
- John R. McCravy III, 13th district (2016–present)
- Tim McGinnis, 56th district (2018–present)
- Cody Mitchell, 65th district (2022–present)
- Travis Moore, 33rd district (2020–present)
- Adam Morgan, 20th district (2018–present)
- Alan Morgan, 18th district (2022–present)
- Chris Murphy, 98th district (2010–present)
- Brandon Newton, 45th district (2016–present)
- Weston J. Newton, 120th district (2013–present)
- David O'Neal, 66th district (2022–present)
- Roger Nutt, 34th district (2020–present)
- Melissa Lackey Oremus, 84th district (2019–present)
- Jordan Pace, 117th district (2022–present)
- Fawn Pedalino, 64th district (2022–present)
- Robby Robbins, 97th district (2022–present)
- Bill Sandifer III, 2nd district (1995–present)
- Mark Smith, 99th district (2020–present)
- Murrell Smith Jr., 67th district (2001–present), Speaker of the House (2022–present)
- Bill Taylor, 86th district (2010–present)
- David Vaughan, 27th district (2022–present)
- Jay West, 7th district (2016–present)
- Bill Whitmire, 1st district (2002–present)

==== Tennessee House of Representatives ====
- Kip Capley, 71st district (2023–present)
- Michele Carringer, 16th district (2021–present)
- Clay Doggett, 70th district (2019–present)
- Jeremy Faison, 11th district (2011–present)
- Ron Gant, 94th district (2017–present)
- Johnny Garrett, 45th district (2019–present), Majority Whip (2021–present)
- Michael Hale, 40th district (2023–present)
- Kelly Keisling, 38th district (2011–present)
- William Lamberth, 44th district (2013–present), Majority Leader (2019–present)
- Mary Littleton, 78th district (2013–present)
- Cameron Sexton, 25th district (2011–present), Speaker of the House (2019–present)
- Todd Warner, 92nd district (2020–present)
- Jason Zachary, 14th district (2015–present)

==== Texas House of Representatives ====
- Dustin Burrows, 83rd district (2015–present)
- Gary Gates, 28th district (2020–present)
- Stan Gerdes, 17th district (2023–present)
- Craig Goldman, 97th district (2013–present), Majority Leader (2023–present), Republican nominee for U.S. Representative from TX-12 in 2024
- Brian Harrison, 10th district (2021–present)
- Brooks Landgraf, 81st district (2015–present)
- Dade Phelan, 21st district (2015–present), Speaker of the House (2021–present)
- Nate Schatzline, 93rd district (2023–present)
- Matt Shaheen, 66th district (2015–present)
- John T. Smithee, 86th district (1985–present)
- Shawn Thierry, 146th district (2017–present) (Democratic until 2024)

==== Utah House of Representatives ====
- Carl Albrecht, 70th district (2017–present)
- Melissa Garff Ballard, 20th district (2019–present)
- Kera Birkeland, 4th district (2023–present), 53rd district (2020–2023)
- Bridger Bolinder, 29th district (2023–present)
- Walt Brooks, 75th district (2016–present)
- Jefferson S. Burton, 64th district (2023–present), 66th district (2021–2023)
- Scott Chew, 68th district (2023–present), 55th district (2015–2023)
- Tyler Clancy, 60th district (2023–present)
- Joseph Elison, 72nd district (2023–present)
- Stephanie Gricius, 50th district (2023–present)
- Matthew Gwyn, 6th district (2023–present), 29th district (2021–2023)
- Jon Hawkins, 55th district (2023–present), 57th district (2019–2023)
- Colin Jack, 73rd district (2023–present)
- Tim Jimenez, 28th district (2023–present)
- Trevor Lee, 16th district (2023–present)
- Karianne Lisonbee, 14th district (2017–present)
- Steven J. Lund, 66th district (2023–present), 58th district (2021–2023)
- Phil Lyman, 69th district (2023–present), 73rd district (2019–2023)
- Matt MacPherson, 26th district (2023–present)
- Cory Maloy, 52nd district (2023–present), 6th district (2017–2023)
- Jefferson Moss, 51st district (2023–present), 2nd district (2017–2023), Majority Leader (2023–present)
- Mike Petersen, 2nd district (2023–present), 3rd district (2021–2023)
- Thomas Peterson, 1st district (2022–present)
- Mike Schultz, 12th district (2015–present), Speaker of the House (2023–present)
- Rex Shipp, 71st district (2023–present), 72nd district (2019–2023)
- Christine Watkins, 67th district (2023–present), 69th district (2017–2023)
- Ryan Wilcox, 7th district (2021–present, 2009–2014)

==== Virginia House of Delegates ====
- Jed Arnold, 46th district (2024–present), 6th district (2023–2024)
- Ellen Campbell, 36th district (2024–present), 24th district (2023–2024)
- Aijalon Cordoza, 86th district (2024–present), 91st district (2022–2024)
- Will Davis, 39th district (2024–present)
- Mark Earley Jr., 73rd district (2024–present)
- Baxter Ennis, 89th district (2024–present)
- Buddy Fowler, 59th district (2024–present), 55th district (2014–2024)
- Tom Garrett, 56th district (2024–present), U.S. Representative from VA-05 (2017–2019)
- Todd Gilbert, 33rd district (2024–present), 15th district (2006–2024), Minority Leader (2024–present, 2020–2022)
- Chad Green, 69th district (2024–present)
- Tim Griffin, 53rd district (2024–present)
- Terry Kilgore, 45th district (2024–present), 1st district (1994–2024), Majority Leader (2022–2024)
- Will Morefield, 43rd district (2024–present), 3rd district (2010–2024)
- Delores Riley Oates, 31st district (2024–present)
- Eric Phillips, 48th district (2024–present)
- Phillip Scott, 63rd district (2024–present), 88th district (2022–2024)
- Chris Runion, 35th district (2024–present), 25th district (2020–2024)
- Wendell Walker, 52nd district (2024–present), 23rd district (2020–2024)
- Bill Wiley, 32nd district (2024–present), 29th district (2020–2024)
- Wren Williams, 47th district (2024–present), 9th district (2022–2024)
- Tony Wilt, 34th district (2024–present), 26th district (2010–2024)
- Thomas C. Wright, 50th district (2024–present), 61st district (2001–2024)
- Scott Wyatt, 60th district (2024–present), 97th district (2020–2024)
- Eric Zehr, 51st district (2024–present)

==== Washington House of Representatives ====
- Cyndy Jacobsen, 25th district (2021–present)

==== West Virginia House of Delegates ====
- David Adkins, 30th district (2022–present)
- Trenton Barnhart, 9th district (2022–present), 7th district (2019–2022)
- Jordan Bridges, 33rd district (2022–present), 24th district (2020–2022)
- Eric Brooks, 45th district (2022–present)
- Jarred Cannon, 21st district (2022–present), 22nd district (2022)
- Geno Chiarelli, 78th district (2022–present)
- Wayne Clark, 99th district (2022–present)
- Elias Coop-Gonzalez, 67th district (2022–present)
- Mark Dean, 34th district (2022–present), 21st district (2016–2022)
- Mike DeVault, 74th district (2022–present)
- Henry Dillon, 29th district (2022–present)
- Dave Foggin, 14th district (2022–present)
- Don Forsht, 91st district (2022–present)
- Geoff Foster, 20th district (2022–present), 15th district (2014–2022)
- Marty Gearheart, 37th district (2022–present), 27th district (2020–2022, 2012–2018), 24th district (2010–2012)
- Anita Hall, 36th district (2022–present)
- Josh Holstein, 32nd district (2022–present), 23rd district (2020–2022)
- Michael Honaker, 46th district (2022–present), 42nd district (2022)
- Michael Hornby, 93rd district (2022–present)
- Eric Householder, 96th district (2022–present), 64th district (2012–2022), 56th district (2010–2012), Majority Leader (2023–present)
- Gary Howell, 87th district (2022–present), 56th district (2012–2022), 49th district (2010–2012), Speaker pro tempore (2021–2023)
- D. Rolland Jennings, 84th district (2022–present), 53rd district (2016–2022)
- David Kelly, 8th district (2022–present), 6th district (2018–2022)
- Daniel Linville, 22nd district (2022–present), 16th district (2018–2022)
- Phil Mallow, 75th district (2022–present), 50th district (2020–2022)
- Carl Martin, 65th district (2022–present), 45th district (2018–2022)
- Margitta Mazzocchi, 31st district (2022–present), 24th district (2020–2022)
- Pat McGeehan, 1st district (2014–present, 2008–2010)
- George Miller, 90th district (2022–present), 58th district (2020–2022)
- Ty Nestor, 66th district (2022–present), 43rd district (2020–2022)
- Chris Phillips, 68th district (2022–present), 47th district (2018–2022)
- Chris Pritt, 53rd district (2022–present), 36th district (2020–2022)
- Charlie Reynolds, 6th district (2022–present), 4th district (2020–2022)
- Doug Smith, 39th district (2022–present), 27th district (2020–2022)
- Brandon Steele, 42nd district (2022–present), 29th district (2018–2022)
- Darren Thorne, 89th district (2022–present)
- Adam Vance, 35th district (2022–present)
- Bryan Ward, 86th district (2022–present), 55th district (2020–2022)
- Jimmy Willis, 3rd district (2022–present)

==== Wisconsin State Assembly ====
- Tyler August, 32nd district (2011–present), Majority Leader (2023–present)
- Ty Bodden, 59th district (2023–present)
- Nik Rettinger, 83rd district (2023–present)
- Travis Tranel, 49th district (2011–present)
- Robin Vos, 63rd district (2005–present), Speaker of the House (2013–present)

==== Wyoming House of Representatives ====
- John Bear, 31st district (2021–present)
- Landon Brown, 9th district (2017–present)
- Rachel Rodriguez-Williams, 50th district (2021–present)
- Clark Stith, 48th district (2017–present), Speaker pro tempore (2023–present)

== Local and county officials ==
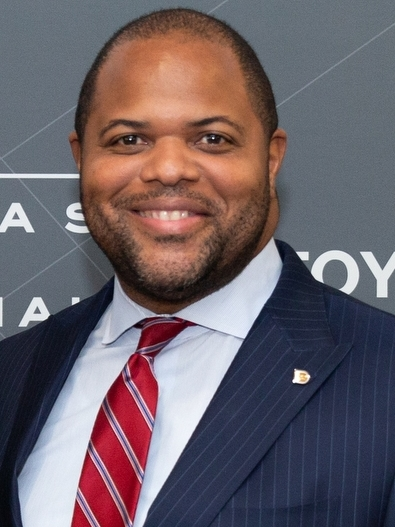
Eric Johnson

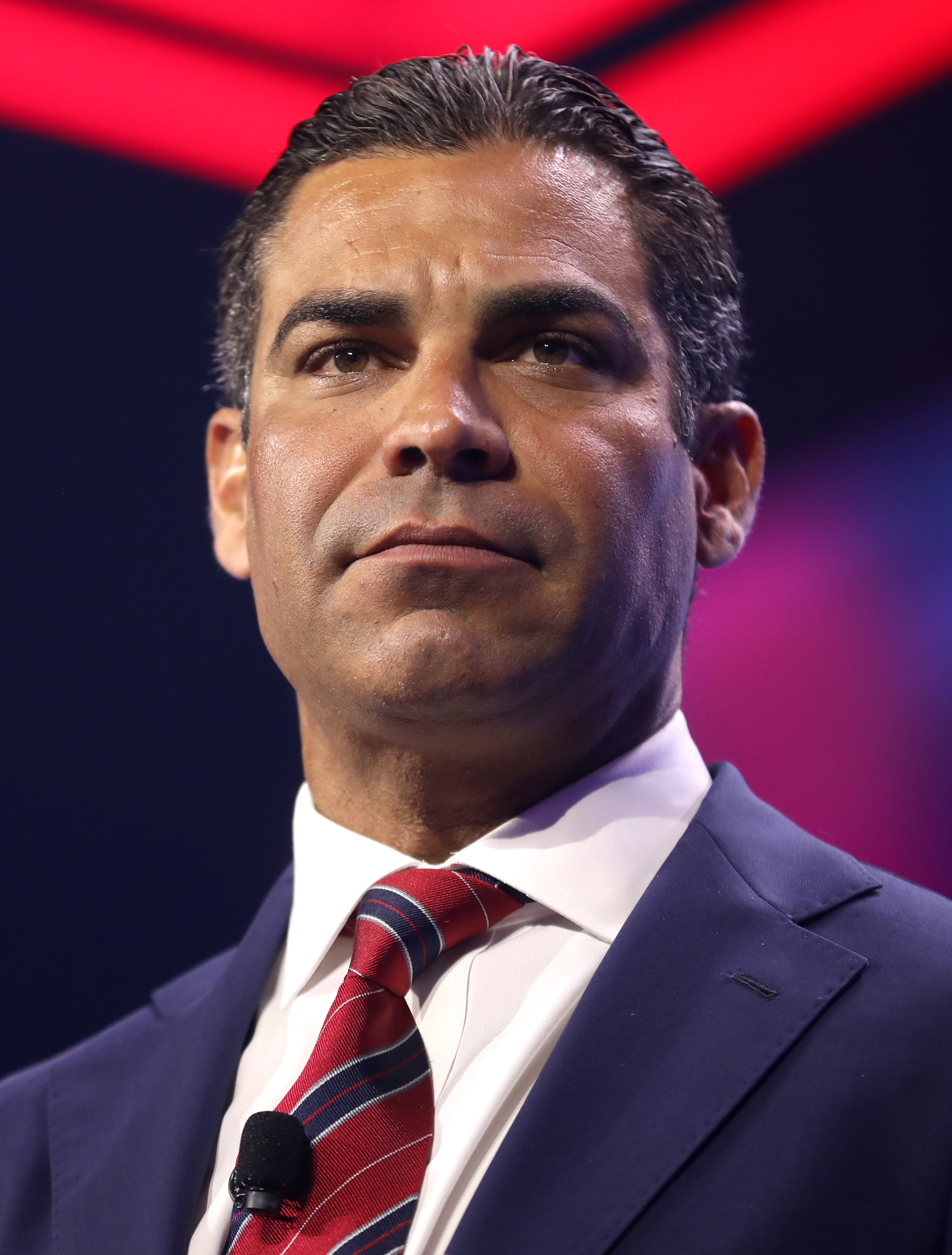
Francis Suarez

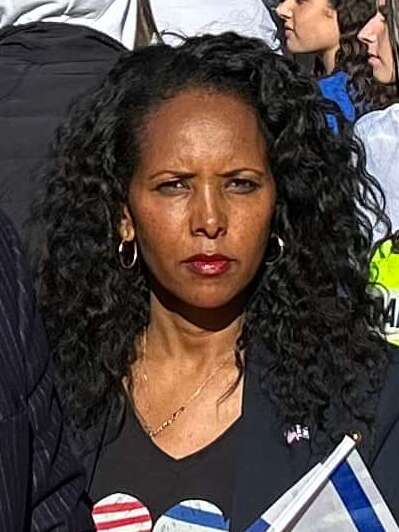
Mazi Melesa Pilip

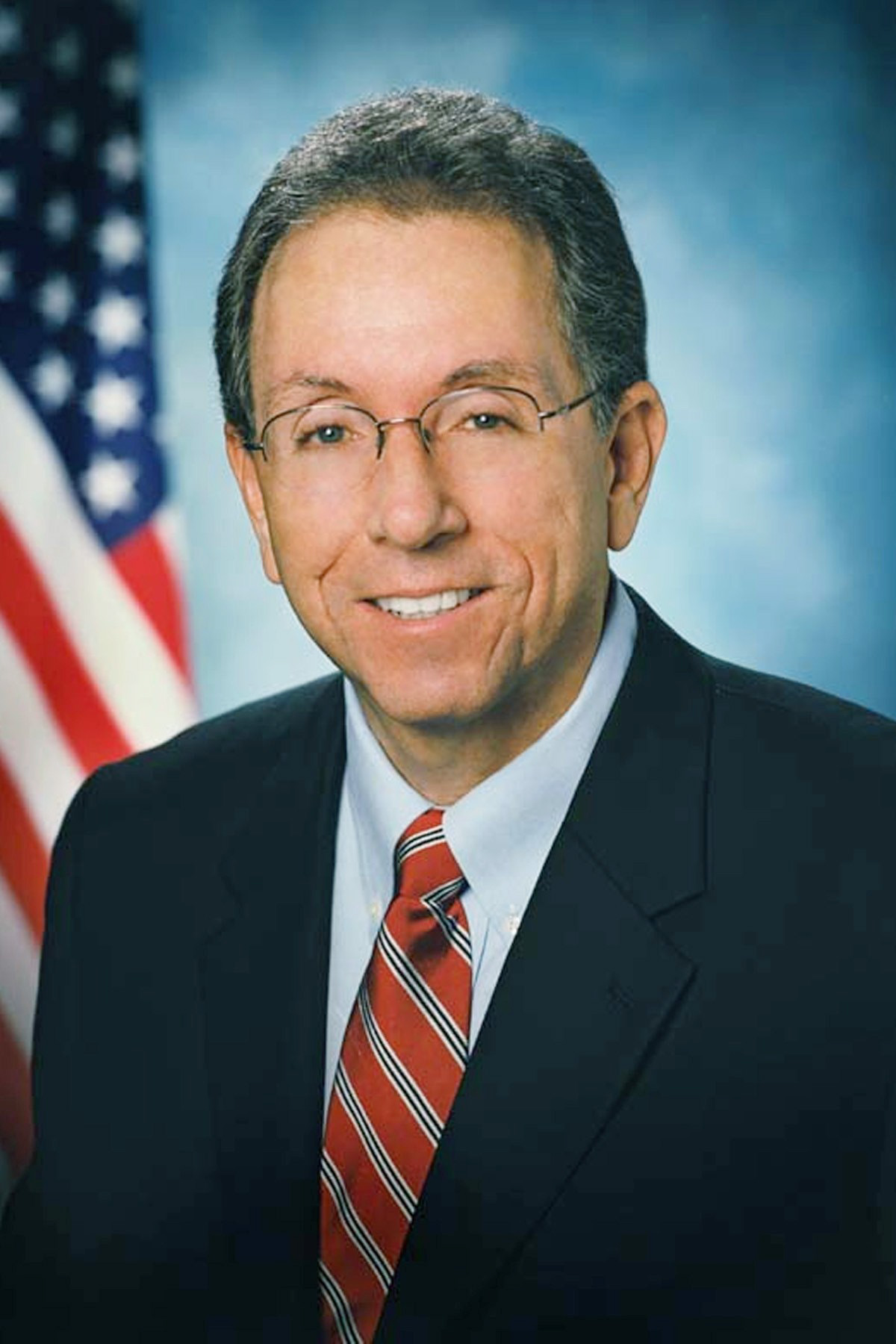
William Snyder

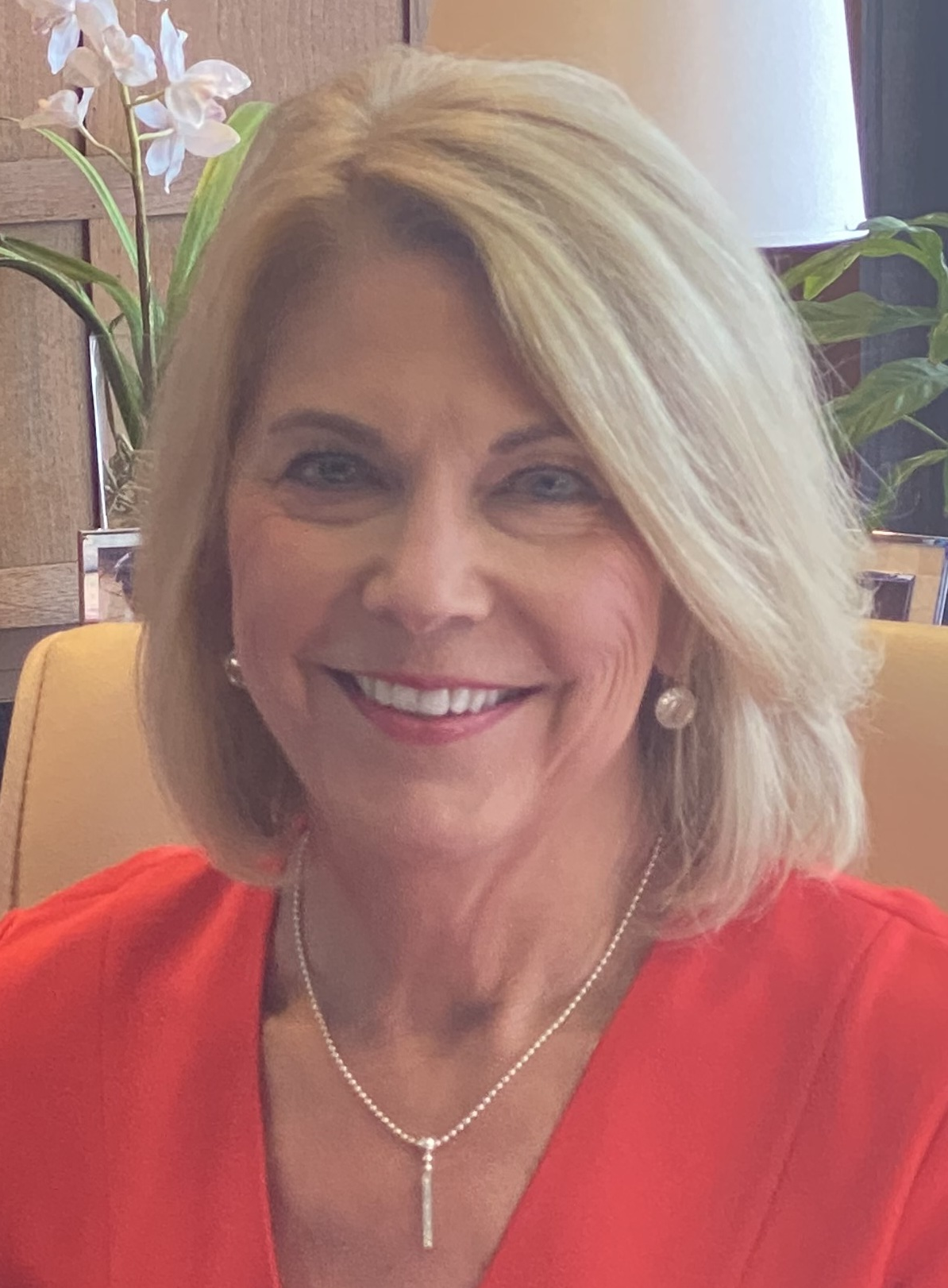
Jean Stothert

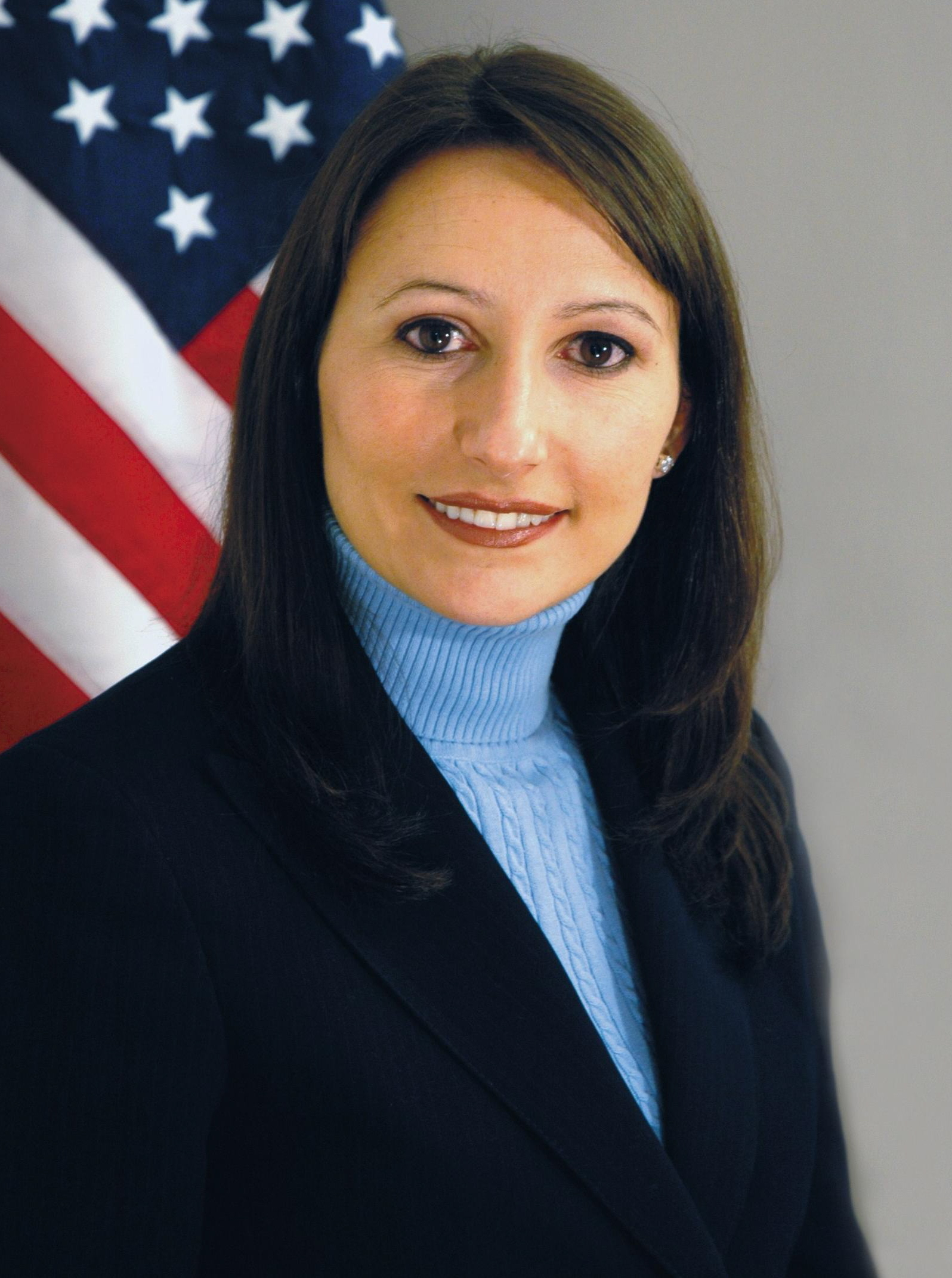
Rosa Rebimbas

=== Mayors and county executives ===
- Bill Bazzi, Mayor of Dearborn Heights (2021–2025)
- Bruce Blakeman, County Executive of Nassau County (2022–present)
- Esteban Bovo, Mayor of Hialeah (2021–2025)
- Robert Cassilly, County Executive of Harford County (2022–present) and state senator from the 34th district (2015–2022)
- Paul Farrow, County Executive of Waukesha County (2015–2026)
- Vito Fossella, Borough President of Staten Island (2022–present) and U.S. Representative from NY-13 (1997–2009)
- Amer Ghalib, Mayor of Hamtramck (2021–2026) (Democratic)
- Richard Irvin, Mayor of Aurora (2017–2025)
- Glenn Jacobs, Mayor of Knox County (2018–2026) and former professional wrestler known as Kane
- Javier Jiménez, Mayor of San Sebastián, Puerto Rico (2005–2025) and candidate for Governor of Puerto Rico in 2024 (Proyecto Dignidad)
- Eric Johnson, Mayor of Dallas (2019–present)
- Steven McLaughlin, County Executive of Rensselaer County (2018–present)
- Trent Staggs, Mayor of Riverton (2018–2026) and Republican candidate for U.S. Senator from Utah in 2024
- Jean Stothert, Mayor of Omaha (2013–2025)
- Francis Suarez, Mayor of Miami (2017–2025) and former 2024 Republican presidential candidate
- Jerry Weiers, Mayor of Glendale (2013–present)

=== Local and county executive officials ===
- Chad Bianco, Sheriff of Riverside County (2019–present)
- Chad Chronister, Sheriff of Hillsborough County (2017–present)
- Bob Gualtieri, Sheriff of Pinellas County (2011–present)
- Mark Lamb, Sheriff of Pinal County (2017–2024)
- Rachel Mitchell, County Attorney of Maricopa County (2022–present, 2019)
- William Snyder, Sheriff of Martin County (2013–2025)

=== Local and county judicial officials ===
- Bobby Christine, District Attorney of the Columbia County Judicial Circuit (2021–2025), U.S. Attorney for the Northern District of Georgia (2021), and U.S. Attorney for the Southern District of Georgia (2017–2021)
- Peter Lucido, Prosecutor of Macomb County (2021–present)
- Rosa Rebimbas, Judge of Probate for Naugatuck (2023–present)

=== Local and county legislative officials ===
- Erik Arroyo, Mayor of Sarasota
- Joe Borelli, Minority Leader of the New York City Council (2021–2025) and Member of the New York City Council from the 51st district (2015–2025)
- David Carr, Member of the New York City Council from the 50th district (2021–present)
- Derek Harvey, County Commissioner (Washington County, Maryland)
- Jared Kushner, Member of the Indian Creek Village Council (2024–present) (Trump's son-in-law)
- Kristy Marmorato, Member of the New York City Council for the 13th district (2024–2025)
- Bob Pacheco, Member of the Walnut City Council (1996–1998, 2013–present)
- Vickie Paladino, Member of the New York City Council from the 19th district (2022–present)
- Mazi Melesa Pilip, Member of the Nassau County Legislature from the 10th district (2022–present)
- Anthony Rodriguez, Miami-Dade County Vice Chairman of County Commissioners (2022–present), Miami-Dade County Commission District 10 (2022–present)
- Peter Spanos, Member of the Belknap County Commission from the 1st district (2021–present)
- Tony Strickland, Member of the Huntington Beach City Council for the at-large district (2022–2025)
- Van Tran, Orange County Water District Board of Directors, Division 2 (2024–present)
- Inna Vernikov, Member of the New York City Council from the 48th district (2021–present) and Minority Whip of the New York City Council (2022–2025)
- Albert C. Zapanta, Member of the Irving City Council from the 6th place (2018–present)

== Other ==
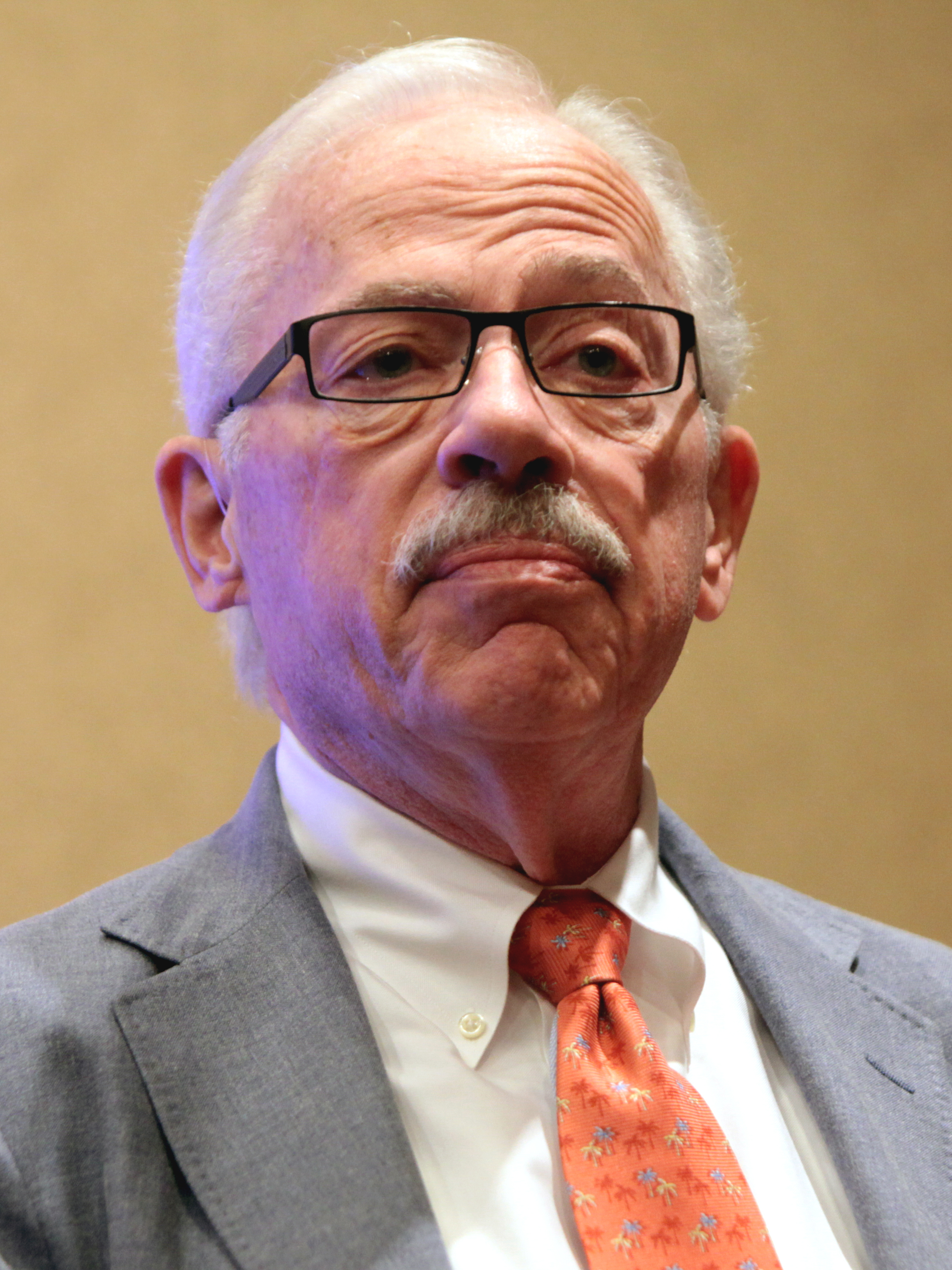
Bob Barr

- Bob Barr, 68th President of the National Rifle Association (2024–2025)
- Bill Johnson, 10th President of Youngstown State University (2024–present)
- Tony Perkins, 4th President of the Family Research Council (2003–present)
- Kevin Roberts, President of The Heritage Foundation and Heritage Action (2021–present)
- Louis E. Sola, Commissioner of the Federal Maritime Commission (2019–2025)

== See also ==
- List of Kamala Harris 2024 presidential campaign congressional legislators endorsements
- List of Donald Trump 2024 presidential campaign endorsements
