= 2022 South Carolina House of Representatives election =

- November 8, 2022

All 124 seats in the South Carolina House of Representatives 62 seats needed for a majority
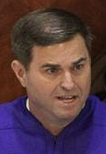

	Majority party	Minority party
Leader	Murrell Smith	Todd Rutherford
Party	Republican	Democratic
Leader since	May 12, 2022	January 8, 2013
Leader's seat	67th	74th
Last election	81	43
Seats won	88	36
Seat change	▲7	▼7
Popular vote	1,027,276	436,566
Percentage	68.96%	29.31%
Swing	▲6.34%	▼5.49%
- Republican hold Republican gain Democratic hold Democratic gain 50–60% 60–70% 70–80% 80–90% >90% 40–50% 50–60% 60–70% 70–80% >90%
Speaker before election
Murrell Smith
Republican
Elected Speaker
Murrell Smith
Republican

The 2022 South Carolina House of Representatives election took place on November 8, 2022, as part of the biennial United States elections. South Carolina voters elected state representatives in all 124 of the state's house districts. Republicans flipped eight seats held by Democrats, while Democrats flipped one seat held by a Republican; with their majority expanded by a net gain of seven seats, Republicans achieved a supermajority in the chamber.

== Results summary ==
The 2022 election results are compared below to the 2020 election.

Parties	Popular vote			Seats			
Parties	Vote	%	Change	2020	2022	+/−	Strength
South Carolina Republican Party	1,027,276	68.96%	+6.34%	81	88	▲7	70.97%
South Carolina Democratic Party	436,566	29.31%	−5.49%	43	36	▼7	29.03%
Write-in	18,402	1.24%	−0.05%	—	—	—	—
Libertarian Party of South Carolina	5,375	0.36%	−0.42%	—	—	—	—
Independent	1,080	0.07%	+0.04%	—	—	—	—
Alliance Party of South Carolina	564	0.04%	−0.28%	—	—	—	—
South Carolina Green Party	456	0.03%	+0.02%	—	—	—	—
Totals	1,489,719	100.0%	—	124	124	Steady	100.0%
Source: South Carolina Election Commission

Popular vote
Republican	68.96%
Democratic	29.31%
Other	1.74%

House seats
Republican	70.97%
Democratic	29.03%

== Retirements ==
In total, 13 representatives (two Democrats and 11 Republicans) retired, one of whom (a Republican) sought another office.

=== Democrats ===
1. District 25: Leola C. Robinson-Simpson retired.
2. District 95: Jerry Govan Jr. retired.

=== Republicans ===
1. District 8: Jonathon D. Hill retired.
2. District 27: Garry R. Smith retired.
3. District 30: Steve Moss retired.
4. District 44: Sandy McGarry retired.
5. District 46: Gary Simrill retired.
6. District 48: Bruce M. Bryant retired.
7. District 65: Jay Lucas retired.
8. District 85: Chip Huggins retired.
9. District 92: Joseph Daning retired.
10. District 106: Russell Fry retired to run for U.S. representative for South Carolina's 7th congressional district.
11. District 110: William S. Cogswell Jr. retired.

== Resignations ==
=== Republicans ===
Two Republicans resigned before the end of their terms.

1. District 97: Mandy Kimmons resigned December 21, 2021, to focus on her legal practice.
2. District 18: Tommy Stringer resigned January 7, 2022, due to family and health concerns.

== Incumbents defeated ==
=== In primary elections ===
==== Democrats ====
Two Democrats lost renomination.

1. District 70: Wendy Brawley lost renomination to fellow incumbent Jermaine Johnson in a redistricting race.
2. District 101: Cezar McKnight lost renomination to fellow incumbent Roger K. Kirby in a redistricting race.

==== Republicans ====
Six Republicans lost renomination.

1. District 6: W. Brian White lost renomination to April Cromer.
2. District 10: West Cox lost renomination to Thomas Beach.
3. District 36: Rita Allison lost renomination to Rob Harris.
4. District 40: Rick Martin lost renomination to Joe White.
5. District 52: Vic Dabney lost renomination to Ben Connell.
6. District 114: Lin Bennett lost renomination to Gary Brewer.

=== In general elections ===
==== Democrats ====
Five Democrats lost re-election to Republicans.

1. District 12: J. Anne Parks lost election to Daniel Gibson.
2. District 64: Kimberly Johnson lost election to Fawn Pedalino.
3. District 116: Chardale Murray lost election to Matt Leber.
4. District 117: Krystle Matthews lost election to Jordan Pace.
5. District 122: Shedron D. Williams lost election to Bill Hager.

==== Republicans ====
One Republican lost re-election to a Democrat.

1. District 75: Kirkman Finlay III lost election to Heather Bauer.

== Closest races ==
Nine races were decided by 10% or lower.

District	Winner	Margin
75	Democratic (flip)	1.59%
102	Democratic	2.24%
55	Democratic	3.30%
116	Republican (flip)	3.42%
54	Democratic	4.66%
12	Republican (flip)	5.83%
115	Democratic	7.61%
122	Republican (flip)	7.98%
110	Republican	8.27%

== Predictions ==
Source	Ranking	As of
Sabato's Crystal Ball	Safe R	May 19, 2022
CNalysis	Solid R	November 7, 2022

== Special elections ==
There were two special elections in 2022 to the South Carolina House of Representatives which preceded the general election.

=== District 97 (special) ===
This election took place on May 17, 2022.

District 97 special election, 2022
Party	Candidate	Votes	%
Republican	Robby Robbins	1,511	63.41
Democratic	ReZsaun Lewis	862	36.17
Write-in		10	0.42
Total votes		2,383	100%
Republican hold			

=== District 18 (special) ===
This election took place on May 24, 2022.

District 18 special election, 2022
Party	Candidate	Votes	%
Republican	Alan Morgan	273	86.39
Write-in		43	13.61
Total votes		316	100%
Republican hold			

== Results by district ==
=== District 1 ===
District 1 general election, 2022
Party	Candidate	Votes	%
Republican	Bill Whitmire (incumbent)	14,049	96.74
Write-in		474	3.26
Total votes		14,523	100.0
Republican hold			

=== District 2 ===
District 2 general election, 2022
Party	Candidate	Votes	%
Republican	Bill Sandifer (incumbent)	10,840	88.35
Write-in		1,430	11.65
Total votes		12,270	100.0
Republican hold			

=== District 3 ===
District 3 general election, 2022
Party	Candidate	Votes	%
Republican	Jerry Carter (incumbent)	7,031	95.39
Write-in		340	4.61
Total votes		7,371	100.0
Republican hold			

=== District 4 ===
District 4 general election, 2022
Party	Candidate	Votes	%
Republican	David Davey Hiott (incumbent)	13,295	98.88
Write-in		150	1.12
Total votes		13,445	100.0
Republican hold			

=== District 5 ===
District 5 general election, 2022
Party	Candidate	Votes	%
Republican	Neal Collins (incumbent)	10,854	97.06
Write-in		329	2.94
Total votes		11,183	100.0
Republican hold			

=== District 6 ===
District 6 general election, 2022
Party	Candidate	Votes	%
Republican	April Cromer	12,137	97.06
Write-in		329	2.80
Total votes		12,486	100.0
Republican hold			

=== District 7 ===
District 7 general election, 2022
Party	Candidate	Votes	%
Republican	Jay West (incumbent)	8,565	77.36
Democratic	Chris Salley	2,489	22.48
Write-in		17	0.15
Total votes		11,071	100.0
Republican hold			

=== District 8 ===
District 8 general election, 2022
Party	Candidate	Votes	%
Republican	Don Chapman	9,267	73.12
Democratic	Ernest E Mackins	3,115	24.58
Alliance	Jackie Todd	260	2.05
Write-in		31	0.24
Total votes		12,673	100.0
Republican hold			

=== District 9 ===
District 9 general election, 2022
Party	Candidate	Votes	%
Republican	Anne Thayer (incumbent)	8,794	74.07
Democratic	Judith Polson	3,071	25.87
Write-in		7	0.06
Total votes		11,872	100.0
Republican hold			

=== District 10 ===
District 10 general election, 2022
Party	Candidate	Votes	%
Republican	Thomas Beach	10,852	98.13
Write-in		207	1.87
Total votes		11,059	100.0
Republican hold			

=== District 11 ===
District 11 general election, 2022
Party	Candidate	Votes	%
Republican	Craig A. Gagnon (incumbent)	10,545	99.23
Write-in		82	0.77
Total votes		10,627	100.0
Republican hold			

=== District 12 ===
District 12 general election, 2022
Party	Candidate	Votes	%
Republican	Daniel Gibson	6,008	52.88
Democratic	Anne Parks (incumbent)	5,345	47.05
Write-in		8	0.07
Total votes		11,361	100.0
Republican gain from Democratic			

=== District 13 ===
District 13 general election, 2022
Party	Candidate	Votes	%
Republican	John McCravy (incumbent)	11,489	74.59
Democratic	Bill Kimler	3,905	25.35
Write-in		9	0.06
Total votes		15,403	100.0
Republican hold			

=== District 14 ===
District 14 general election, 2022
Party	Candidate	Votes	%
Republican	Stewart O Jones (incumbent)	8,960	70.38
Democratic	Daniel A Duncan	3,728	29.29
Write-in		42	0.33
Total votes		12,730	100.0
Republican hold			

=== District 15 ===
District 15 general election, 2022
Party	Candidate	Votes	%
Democratic	J.A. Moore (incumbent)	4,326	56.83
Republican	Latrecia Pond	3,276	43.04
Write-in		10	0.13
Total votes		7,612	100.0
Democratic hold			

=== District 16 ===
District 16 general election, 2022
Party	Candidate	Votes	%
Republican	Mark N Willis (incumbent)	11,081	98.02
Write-in		224	1.98
Total votes		11,305	100.0
Republican hold			

=== District 17 ===
District 17 general election, 2022
Party	Candidate	Votes	%
Republican	Mike Burns (incumbent)	14,127	98.37
Write-in		234	1.63
Total votes		14,361	100.0
Republican hold			

=== District 18 ===
District 18 general election, 2022
Party	Candidate	Votes	%
Republican	Alan Morgan	11,431	76.53
Democratic	Michael Reitz	3,462	23.18
Write-in		44	0.29
Total votes		14,937	100.0
Republican hold			

=== District 19 ===
District 19 general election, 2022
Party	Candidate	Votes	%
Republican	Patrick B Haddon (incumbent)	7,851	96.82
Write-in		258	3.18
Total votes		8,109	100.0
Republican hold			

=== District 20 ===
District 20 general election, 2022
Party	Candidate	Votes	%
Republican	Adam Morgan (incumbent)	11,358	97.78
Write-in		258	2.22
Total votes		11,616	100.0
Republican hold			

=== District 21 ===
District 21 general election, 2022
Party	Candidate	Votes	%
Republican	Bobby Cox (incumbent)	13,109	97.80
Write-in		295	2.20
Total votes		13,404	100.0
Republican hold			

=== District 22 ===
District 22 general election, 2022
Party	Candidate	Votes	%
Republican	Jason Elliott (incumbent)	12,006	96.33
Write-in		457	3.67
Total votes		12,463	100.0
Republican hold			

=== District 23 ===
District 23 general election, 2022
Party	Candidate	Votes	%
Democratic	Chandra Dillard (incumbent)	6,054	97.16
Write-in		177	2.84
Total votes		6,231	100.0
Democratic hold			

=== District 24 ===
District 24 general election, 2022
Party	Candidate	Votes	%
Republican	Bruce W Bannister (incumbent)	12,049	96.77
Write-in		402	3.23
Total votes		12,451	100.0
Republican hold			

=== District 25 ===
District 25 general election, 2022
Party	Candidate	Votes	%
Democratic	Wendell Jones	5,558	61.73
Republican	Yvonne Julian	3,040	33.76
Independent	Tony Boyce	391	4.34
Write-in		15	0.17
Total votes		9,004	100.0
Democratic hold			

=== District 26 ===
District 26 general election, 2022
Party	Candidate	Votes	%
Republican	Raye Felder (incumbent)	9,354	63.32
Democratic	Matt Vilardebo	5,407	36.60
Write-in		11	0.07
Total votes		14,772	100.0
Republican hold			

=== District 27 ===
District 27 general election, 2022
Party	Candidate	Votes	%
Republican	David Vaughan	10,890	97.40
Write-in		291	2.60
Total votes		11,181	100.0
Republican hold			

=== District 28 ===
District 28 general election, 2022
Party	Candidate	Votes	%
Republican	Ashley Trantham (incumbent)	10,162	67.80
Democratic	Fritz	4,804	32.05
Write-in		22	0.15
Total votes		14,988	100.0
Republican hold			

=== District 29 ===
District 29 general election, 2022
Party	Candidate	Votes	%
Republican	Dennis Moss (incumbent)	10,668	98.92
Write-in		117	1.08
Total votes		10,785	100.0
Republican hold			

=== District 30 ===
District 30 general election, 2022
Party	Candidate	Votes	%
Republican	Brian Lawson	9,971	99.10
Write-in		91	0.90
Total votes		10,062	100.0
Republican hold			

=== District 31 ===
District 31 general election, 2022
Party	Candidate	Votes	%
Democratic	Rosalyn Henderson-Myers (incumbent)	5,536	97.90
Write-in		119	2.10
Total votes		5,655	100.0
Democratic hold			

=== District 32 ===
District 32 general election, 2022
Party	Candidate	Votes	%
Republican	Max Hyde (incumbent)	8,682	96.93
Write-in		275	3.07
Total votes		8,957	100.0
Republican hold			

=== District 33 ===
District 33 general election, 2022
Party	Candidate	Votes	%
Republican	Travis A Moore (incumbent)	11,203	98.44
Write-in		177	1.56
Total votes		11,380	100.0
Republican hold			

=== District 34 ===
District 34 general election, 2022
Party	Candidate	Votes	%
Republican	Roger A Nut t(incumbent)	10,732	98.03
Write-in		216	1.97
Total votes		10,948	100.0
Republican hold			

=== District 35 ===
District 35 general election, 2022
Party	Candidate	Votes	%
Republican	Bill Chumley (incumbent)	12,269	98.01
Write-in		249	1.99
Total votes		12,518	100.0
Republican hold			

=== District 36 ===
District 36 general election, 2022
Party	Candidate	Votes	%
Republican	Rob Harris	8,607	97.97
Write-in		178	2.03
Total votes		8,785	100.0
Republican hold			

=== District 37 ===
District 37 general election, 2022
Party	Candidate	Votes	%
Republican	Steven W Long (incumbent)	9,379	97.84
Write-in		207	2.16
Total votes		9,586	100.0
Republican hold			

=== District 38 ===
District 38 general election, 2022
Party	Candidate	Votes	%
Republican	Josiah Magnuson (incumbent)	12,875	98.36
Write-in		215	1.64
Total votes		13,090	100.0
Republican hold			

=== District 39 ===
District 39 general election, 2022
Party	Candidate	Votes	%
Republican	Cal Forrest (incumbent)	12,385	99.06
Write-in		118	0.94
Total votes		12,503	100.0
Republican hold			

=== District 40 ===
District 40 general election, 2022
Party	Candidate	Votes	%
Republican	Joe White	10,821	98.16
Write-in		203	1.84
Total votes		11,024	100.0
Republican hold			

=== District 41 ===
District 41 general election, 2022
Party	Candidate	Votes	%
Democratic	Annie E McDaniel (incumbent)	8,075	57.28
Republican	Jennifer Brecheisen	6,005	42.59
Write-in		18	0.13
Total votes		14,098	100.0
Democratic hold			

=== District 42 ===
District 42 general election, 2022
Party	Candidate	Votes	%
Republican	Doug Gilliam (incumbent)	8,905	94.57
Write-in		511	5.43
Total votes		9,416	100.0
Republican hold			

=== District 43 ===
District 43 general election, 2022
Party	Candidate	Votes	%
Republican	Randy Ligon (incumbent)	10,334	98.64
Write-in		142	1.36
Total votes		10,476	100.0
Republican hold			

=== District 44 ===
District 44 general election, 2022
Party	Candidate	Votes	%
Republican	Mike Neese	11,725	62.71
Democratic	Katie Crosby	6,647	35.55
Independent	Aaron McKinney	306	1.64
Write-in		20	0.11
Total votes		18,698	100.0
Republican hold			

=== District 45 ===
District 45 general election, 2022
Party	Candidate	Votes	%
Republican	Brandon Newton (incumbent)	8,124	67.26
Democratic	Keith T Grey Sr	3,939	32.61
Write-in		16	0.13
Total votes		12,079	100.0
Republican hold			

=== District 46 ===
District 46 general election, 2022
Party	Candidate	Votes	%
Republican	Heath Sessions	10,373	97.55
Write-in		261	2.45
Total votes		10,634	100.0
Republican hold			

=== District 47 ===
District 47 general election, 2022
Party	Candidate	Votes	%
Republican	Tommy Pope (incumbent)	12,501	98.54
Write-in		185	1.46
Total votes		12,686	100.0
Republican hold			

=== District 48 ===
District 48 general election, 2022
Party	Candidate	Votes	%
Republican	Brandon Guffey	10,938	67.35
Democratic	Andrew Russell	5,279	32.50
Write-in		24	0.15
Total votes		16,241	100.0
Republican hold			

=== District 49 ===
District 49 general election, 2022
Party	Candidate	Votes	%
Democratic	John R King (incumbent)	6,346	64.84
Republican	Thomas Hardin	3,436	35.11
Write-in		5	0.05
Total votes		9,787	100.0
Democratic hold			

=== District 50 ===
District 50 general election, 2022
Party	Candidate	Votes	%
Democratic	Will Wheeler	7,815	59.98
Republican	Marvin Jones	5,201	39.92
Write-in		13	0.10
Total votes		13,029	100.0
Democratic hold			

=== District 51 ===
District 51 general election, 2022
Party	Candidate	Votes	%
Democratic	David Weeks (incumbent)	7,895	98.42
Write-in		127	1.58
Total votes		8,022	100.0
Democratic hold			

=== District 52 ===
District 52 general election, 2022
Party	Candidate	Votes	%
Republican	Ben Connell	9,356	64.79
Democratic	Eve Carlin	5,036	34.88
Write-in		48	0.33
Total votes		14,440	100.0
Republican hold			

=== District 53 ===
District 53 general election, 2022
Party	Candidate	Votes	%
Republican	Richard L Richie Yow (incumbent)	9,777	99.32
Write-in		67	0.68
Total votes		11,249	100.0
Republican hold			

=== District 54 ===
District 54 general election, 2022
Party	Candidate	Votes	%
Democratic	Patricia Moore Pat Henegan (incumbent)	5,804	52.30
Republican	Sterling McDiarmid	5,287	47.64
Write-in		7	0.06
Total votes		11,098	100.0
Democratic hold			

=== District 55 ===
District 55 general election, 2022
Party	Candidate	Votes	%
Democratic	Jackie E Hayes (incumbent)	5,577	49.85
Republican	Robert Norton	5,208	46.55
Independent	Michael Copland	383	3.42
Write-in		20	0.18
Total votes		11,188	100.0
Democratic hold			

=== District 56 ===
District 56 general election, 2022
Party	Candidate	Votes	%
Republican	Tim McGinnis (incumbent)	13,242	98.81
Write-in		159	1.19
Total votes		13,401	100.0
Republican hold			

=== District 57 ===
District 57 general election, 2022
Party	Candidate	Votes	%
Democratic	Lucas Atkinson (incumbent)	8,500	98.53
Write-in		127	1.47
Total votes		8,627	100.0
Democratic hold			

=== District 58 ===
District 58 general election, 2022
Party	Candidate	Votes	%
Republican	Jeff Johnson (incumbent)	10,115	98.97
Write-in		105	1.03
Total votes		10,220	100.0
Republican hold			

=== District 59 ===
District 59 general election, 2022
Party	Candidate	Votes	%
Democratic	Terry Alexander (incumbent)	7,483	97.96
Write-in		156	2.04
Total votes		7,639	100.0
Democratic hold			

=== District 60 ===
District 60 general election, 2022
Party	Candidate	Votes	%
Republican	Phillip Lowe (incumbent)	9,550	98.51
Write-in		144	1.49
Total votes		9,694	100.0
Republican hold			

=== District 61 ===
District 61 general election, 2022
Party	Candidate	Votes	%
Republican	Carla Schuessler	8,365	69.23
Democratic	Ashlyn Preaux	3,703	30.65
Write-in		15	0.12
Total votes		12,083	100.0
Republican gain from Democratic			

=== District 62 ===
District 62 general election, 2022
Party	Candidate	Votes	%
Democratic	Robert Williams (incumbent)	6,974	96.74
Write-in		235	3.26
Total votes		7,209	100.0
Democratic hold			

=== District 63 ===
District 63 general election, 2022
Party	Candidate	Votes	%
Republican	Jay Jordan (incumbent)	9,432	68.73
Democratic	Vincent Coe	4,276	31.16
Write-in		16	0.12
Total votes		13,724	100.0
Republican hold			

=== District 64 ===
District 64 general election, 2022
Party	Candidate	Votes	%
Republican	Fawn Pedalino	7,796	55.19
Democratic	Kimberly O Johnson (incumbent)	6,315	44.71
Write-in		14	0.10
Total votes		14,125	100.0
Republican gain from Democratic			

=== District 65 ===
District 65 general election, 2022
Party	Candidate	Votes	%
Republican	Cody T Mitchell	10,760	98.94
Write-in		115	1.06
Total votes		10,875	100.0
Republican hold			

=== District 66 ===
District 66 general election, 2022
Party	Candidate	Votes	%
Republican	David L O'Neal	8,615	57.72
Democratic	Carla Litrenta	6,297	42.19
Write-in		13	0.09
Total votes		14,925	100.0
Republican gain from Democratic			

=== District 67 ===
District 67 general election, 2022
Party	Candidate	Votes	%
Republican	Murrell Smith (incumbent)	9,705	98.43
Write-in		155	1.57
Total votes		9,860	100.0
Republican hold			

=== District 68 ===
District 68 general election, 2022
Party	Candidate	Votes	%
Republican	Heather Ammons Crawford (incumbent)	10,910	71.95
Democratic	Ernest Carson	4,243	27.98
Write-in		11	0.07
Total votes		15,164	100.0
Republican hold			

=== District 69 ===
District 69 general election, 2022
Party	Candidate	Votes	%
Republican	Chris Wooten (incumbent)	11,836	97.69
Write-in		280	2.31
Total votes		12,116	100.0
Republican hold			

=== District 70 ===
District 70 general election, 2022
Party	Candidate	Votes	%
Democratic	Jermaine Johnson	10,052	76.45
Republican	Vincent E Wilson	2,623	19.95
Green	Charla Henson-Simons	456	3.47
Write-in		18	0.14
Total votes		13,149	100.0
Democratic hold			

=== District 71 ===
District 71 general election, 2022
Party	Candidate	Votes	%
Republican	Nathan Ballentine (incumbent)	13,712	97.78
Write-in		311	2.22
Total votes		14,023	100.0
Republican hold			

=== District 72 ===
District 72 general election, 2022
Party	Candidate	Votes	%
Democratic	Seth Rose (incumbent)	5,730	98.49
Write-in		88	1.51
Total votes		5,818	100.0
Democratic hold			

=== District 73 ===
District 73 general election, 2022
Party	Candidate	Votes	%
Democratic	Chris Hart (incumbent)	8,305	98.58
Write-in		120	1.42
Total votes		8,425	100.0
Democratic hold			

=== District 74 ===
District 74 general election, 2022
Party	Candidate	Votes	%
Democratic	Todd Rutherford (incumbent)	9,089	98.60
Write-in		129	1.40
Total votes		9,218	100.0
Democratic hold			

=== District 75 ===
2022 South Carolina's 75th State House district election
Nominee	Heather Bauer	Kirkman Finlay III
Party	Democratic	Republican
Popular vote	7,505	7,270
Percentage	50.7%	49.2%
- Precinct results Bauer: 50–60% 60–70% 70–80% 80–90% Finlay III: 50–60% 60–70%
State representative before election
Kirkman Finlay III
Republican
Elected State representative
Heather Bauer
Democratic

The 75th district, which is nestled in the heart of Richland County, contains some of Columbia's more affluent neighborhoods, including Forest Acres, Shandon, and Rosewood. The incumbent was Republican Kirkman Finlay III, who was re-elected with 50.7% of the vote in 2020.

=== Republican primary ===
==== Candidates ====
===== Nominee =====
- Kirkman Finlay III, incumbent state representative

=== Democratic primary ===
==== Candidates ====
===== Nominee =====
- Heather Bauer, entrepreneur and candidate for this district in 2020

=== General election ===
==== Predictions ====
Source	Ranking	As of
CNalysis	Likely R	November 7, 2022

==== Endorsements ====
Kirkman Finlay III

State officials

- Leon Howard, state representative for the 76th district (1995–present) (Democratic)

Local officials

- Leon Lott, sheriff of Richland County (1997–present) and commander of the South Carolina State Guard (2018–present) (Democratic)
Heather Bauer

Organizations

- Emerge America
- Everytown for Gun Safety
- Planned Parenthood
- Progressive Turnout Project
- Run for Something
- Working Families

==== Fundraising ====
Campaign finance reports as of December 31, 2022
Candidate (party)	Total receipts	Total disbursements	Cash on hand
Kirkman Finlay III (R)	$340,078	$326,928	$5,614
Heather Bauer (D)	$65,968	$64,534	$1,434
Source: South Carolina Ethics Commission

==== Results ====
District 75 general election, 2022
Party	Candidate	Votes	%
Democratic	Heather Bauer	7,505	50.74
Republican	Kirkman Finlay III (incumbent)	7,270	49.15
Write-in		17	0.11
Total votes		14,792	100.0
Democratic gain from Republican			

=== District 76 ===
District 76 general election, 2022
Party	Candidate	Votes	%
Democratic	Leon Howard (incumbent)	9,186	99.04
Write-in		89	0.96
Total votes		9,275	100.0
Democratic hold			

=== District 77 ===
District 77 general election, 2022
Party	Candidate	Votes	%
Democratic	Kambrell Garvin (incumbent)	10,183	70.88
Republican	Kizzie Smalls	4,179	29.09
Write-in		5	0.03
Total votes		14,367	100.0
Democratic hold			

=== District 78 ===
District 78 general election, 2022
Party	Candidate	Votes	%
Democratic	Beth Bernstein (incumbent)	9,770	97.91
Write-in		209	2.09
Total votes		9,979	100.0
Democratic hold			

=== District 79 ===
District 79 general election, 2022
Party	Candidate	Votes	%
Democratic	Ivory T Thigpen (incumbent)	10,105	74.53
Republican	Melissa McFadden	3,440	25.37
Write-in		13	0.10
Total votes		13,558	100.0
Democratic hold			

=== District 80 ===
District 80 general election, 2022
Party	Candidate	Votes	%
Republican	Kathy Landing	11,766	62.88
Democratic	Donna Brown Newton	6,926	37.01
Write-in		20	0.11
Total votes		18,712	100.0
Republican gain from Democratic			

=== District 81 ===
District 81 general election, 2022
Party	Candidate	Votes	%
Republican	Bart T Blackwell (incumbent)	13,180	97.41
Write-in		351	2.59
Total votes		13,531	100.0
Republican hold			

=== District 82 ===
District 82 general election, 2022
Party	Candidate	Votes	%
Democratic	William Bill Clyburn (incumbent)	6,510	94.03
Write-in		413	5.97
Total votes		6,923	100.0
Democratic hold			

=== District 83 ===
District 83 general election, 2022
Party	Candidate	Votes	%
Republican	Bill Hixon (incumbent)	10,430	75.94
Democratic	Jerico McCoy	3,287	23.93
Write-in		17	0.12
Total votes		11,188	100.0
Republican hold			

=== District 84 ===
District 84 general election, 2022
Party	Candidate	Votes	%
Republican	Melissa Oremus (incumbent)	8,934	97.92
Write-in		190	2.08
Total votes		9,124	100.0
Republican hold			

=== District 85 ===
District 85 general election, 2022
Party	Candidate	Votes	%
Republican	Jay Kilmartin	11,450	75.53
Libertarian	John Davis	3,611	23.82
Write-in		99	0.65
Total votes		15,160	100.0
Republican hold			

=== District 86 ===
District 86 general election, 2022
Party	Candidate	Votes	%
Republican	Bill Taylor (incumbent)	9,727	98.30
Write-in		168	1.70
Total votes		9,895	100.0
Republican hold			

=== District 87 ===
District 87 general election, 2022
Party	Candidate	Votes	%
Republican	Paula Rawl Calhoon (incumbent)	14,153	98.48
Write-in		219	1.52
Total votes		14,372	100.0
Republican hold			

=== District 88 ===
District 88 general election, 2022
Party	Candidate	Votes	%
Republican	RJ May (incumbent)	8,304	70.09
Democratic	Daniel J Shrief	3,531	29.81
Write-in		12	0.10
Total votes		11,847	100.0
Republican hold			

=== District 89 ===
District 89 general election, 2022
Party	Candidate	Votes	%
Republican	Micah Caskey (incumbent)	8,760	96.84
Write-in		286	3.16
Total votes		9,046	100.0
Republican hold			

=== District 90 ===
District 90 general election, 2022
Party	Candidate	Votes	%
Democratic	Justin Bamberg (incumbent)	6,845	58.72
Republican	Robert Norton	4,805	41.22
Write-in		8	0.07
Total votes		11,658	100.0
Democratic hold			

=== District 91 ===
District 91 general election, 2022
Party	Candidate	Votes	%
Democratic	Lonnie Hosey (incumbent)	7,560	97.15
Write-in		222	2.85
Total votes		7,782	100.0
Democratic hold			

=== District 92 ===
District 92 general election, 2022
Party	Candidate	Votes	%
Republican	Brandon Cox	9,283	97.79
Write-in		210	2.21
Total votes		9,493	100.0
Republican hold			

=== District 93 ===
District 93 general election, 2022
Party	Candidate	Votes	%
Democratic	Russell L Ott (incumbent)	8,139	60.77
Republican	Jim Ulmer	5,238	39.11
Write-in		16	0.12
Total votes		13,393	100.0
Democratic hold			

=== District 94 ===
District 94 general election, 2022
Party	Candidate	Votes	%
Republican	Gil Gatch (incumbent)	8,363	63.26
Democratic	Ilene Davis	4,837	36.59
Write-in		19	0.14
Total votes		13,219	100.0
Republican hold			

=== District 95 ===
District 95 general election, 2022
Party	Candidate	Votes	%
Democratic	Gilda Cobb-Hunter	8,033	59.11
Republican	Jeffrey Cila	5,545	40.81
Write-in		11	0.08
Total votes		13,589	100.0
Democratic hold			

=== District 96 ===
District 96 general election, 2022
Party	Candidate	Votes	%
Republican	D Ryan McCabe (incumbent)	8,323	98.32
Write-in		142	1.68
Total votes		8,465	100.0
Republican hold			

=== District 97 ===
District 97 general election, 2022
Party	Candidate	Votes	%
Republican	Robby Robbins	9,140	68.08
Democratic	ReZsaun Lewis	4,274	31.83
Write-in		12	0.09
Total votes		13,426	100.0
Republican hold			

=== District 98 ===
District 98 general election, 2022
Party	Candidate	Votes	%
Republican	Christopher J Murphy (incumbent)	6,770	57.82
Democratic	Sydney Clinton	4,925	42.06
Write-in		14	0.12
Total votes		11,709	100.0
Republican hold			

=== District 99 ===
District 99 general election, 2022
Party	Candidate	Votes	%
Republican	Marvin Mark Smith (incumbent)	11,104	98.23
Write-in		200	1.77
Total votes		11,304	100.0
Republican hold			

=== District 100 ===
District 100 general election, 2022
Party	Candidate	Votes	%
Republican	Sylleste Davis (incumbent)	9,639	98.34
Write-in		163	1.66
Total votes		9,802	100.0
Republican hold			

=== District 101 ===
District 101 general election, 2022
Party	Candidate	Votes	%
Democratic	Roger K Kirby	8,662	97.49
Write-in		223	2.51
Total votes		8,885	100.0
Democratic hold			

=== District 102 ===
The 102nd district takes in parts of Berkeley and Dorchester counties; its share of Dorchester includes a portion of Summerville, the county's second-most populous municipality. The incumbent was Democrat Joe Jefferson, who was re-elected unopposed in 2020.

=== Democratic primary ===
==== Candidates ====
===== Nominee =====
- Joe Jefferson, incumbent state representative

===== Eliminated in primary =====
- Collin Holloway

==== Results ====
District 102 Democratic primary
Party	Candidate	Votes	%
Democratic	Joe Jefferson (incumbent)	1,805	84.58
Democratic	Collin Holloway	329	15.42
Total votes		2,134	100.0

=== Republican primary ===
==== Candidates ====
===== Nominee =====
- Ralph Elsey

=== General election ===
==== Predictions ====
Source	Ranking	As of
CNalysis	Tilt D	November 7, 2022

==== Endorsements ====
Joe Jefferson

Organizations

- Conservation Voters of South Carolina
- Planned Parenthood
- Progressive Turnout Project

==== Fundraising ====
Campaign finance reports as of December 31, 2022
Candidate (party)	Total receipts	Total disbursements	Cash on hand
Joe Jefferson (D)	$14,694	$15,472	$10,941
Ralph Elsey (R)	$6,172	$6,512	$97
Source: South Carolina Ethics Commission

==== Results ====
District 102 general election, 2022
Party	Candidate	Votes	%
Democratic	Joe Jefferson (incumbent)	6,353	51.08
Republican	Ralph Elsey	6,075	48.84
Write-in		10	0.08
Total votes		12,438	100.0
Democratic hold			

=== District 103 ===
District 103 general election, 2022
Party	Candidate	Votes	%
Democratic	Carl Anderson (incumbent)	7,458	97.30
Write-in		207	2.70
Total votes		7,665	100.0
Democratic hold			

=== District 104 ===
District 104 general election, 2022
Party	Candidate	Votes	%
Republican	William Bailey (incumbent)	16,810	99.17
Write-in		140	0.83
Total votes		16,950	100.0
Republican hold			

=== District 105 ===
District 105 general election, 2022
Party	Candidate	Votes	%
Republican	Kevin Hardee (incumbent)	12,110	99.10
Write-in		110	0.90
Total votes		12,220	100.0
Republican hold			

=== District 106 ===
District 106 general election, 2022
Party	Candidate	Votes	%
Republican	Val Guest	14,675	72.70
Democratic	Ryan Thompson	5,508	27.29
Write-in		4	0.02
Total votes		20,187	100.0
Republican hold			

=== District 107 ===
District 107 general election, 2022
Party	Candidate	Votes	%
Republican	Case Brittain (incumbent)	11,742	98.51
Write-in		177	1.49
Total votes		11,919	100.0
Republican hold			

=== District 108 ===
District 108 general election, 2022
Party	Candidate	Votes	%
Republican	Lee Hewitt (incumbent)	15,847	98.91
Write-in		175	1.09
Total votes		16,022	100.0
Republican hold			

=== District 109 ===
District 109 general election, 2022
Party	Candidate	Votes	%
Democratic	Deon Tedder (incumbent)	5,912	76.44
Libertarian	Rodney Travis	1,764	22.81
Write-in		58	0.75
Total votes		7,734	100.0
Democratic hold			

=== District 110 ===
District 110 general election, 2022
Party	Candidate	Votes	%
Republican	Tom Hartnett	9,729	54.12
Democratic	Ellis Roberts	8,243	45.85
Write-in		5	0.03
Total votes		17,977	100.0
Republican hold			

=== District 111 ===
District 111 general election, 2022
Party	Candidate	Votes	%
Democratic	Wendell Gilliard (incumbent)	9,541	98.21
Write-in		174	1.79
Total votes		9,715	100.0
Democratic hold			

=== District 112 ===
District 112 general election, 2022
Party	Candidate	Votes	%
Republican	Joe Bustos (incumbent)	12,007	59.10
Democratic	David Stanley Artushin	8,267	40.69
Write-in		41	0.20
Total votes		20,315	100.0
Republican hold			

=== District 113 ===
District 113 general election, 2022
Party	Candidate	Votes	%
Democratic	Marvin R. Pendarvis (incumbent)	6,056	98.14
Write-in		115	1.86
Total votes		6,171	100.0
Democratic hold			

=== District 114 ===
District 114 general election, 2022
Party	Candidate	Votes	%
Republican	Gary Brewer	9,683	58.87
Democratic	Michelle Brandt	6,760	41.10
Write-in		6	0.04
Total votes		16,449	100.0
Republican hold			

=== District 115 ===
District 115 general election, 2022
Party	Candidate	Votes	%
Democratic	Spencer Wetmore (incumbent)	10,734	53.77
Republican	Carroll O'Neal	9,215	46.16
Write-in		14	0.07
Total votes		19,963	100.0
Democratic hold			

=== District 116 ===
District 116 general election, 2022
Party	Candidate	Votes	%
Republican	Matt Leber	8,774	51.67
Democratic	Chardale Murray (incumbent)	8,193	48.25
Write-in		13	0.08
Total votes		16,980	100.0
Republican gain from Democratic			

=== District 117 ===
District 117 general election, 2022
Party	Candidate	Votes	%
Republican	Jordan Pace	8,515	63.55
Democratic	Krystle Matthews (incumbent)	4,874	36.38
Write-in		10	0.07
Total votes		13,399	100.0
Republican gain from Democratic			

=== District 118 ===
District 118 general election, 2022
Party	Candidate	Votes	%
Republican	Bill Herbkersman (incumbent)	12,584	96.58
Write-in		445	3.42
Total votes		13,029	100.0
Republican hold			

=== District 119 ===
District 119 general election, 2022
Party	Candidate	Votes	%
Democratic	Leon Stavrinakis (incumbent)	10,299	57.47
Republican	Ken Fipps	7,609	42.46
Write-in		13	0.07
Total votes		17,921	100.0
Democratic hold			

=== District 120 ===
District 120 general election, 2022
Party	Candidate	Votes	%
Republican	Weston Newton (incumbent)	13,427	98.62
Write-in		188	1.38
Total votes		13,615	100.0
Republican hold			

=== District 121 ===
District 121 general election, 2022
Party	Candidate	Votes	%
Democratic	Michael F. Rivers Sr. (incumbent)	6,523	57.33
Republican	Eric J Erickson	4,848	42.61
Write-in		6	0.05
Total votes		11,377	100.0
Democratic hold			

=== District 122 ===
District 122 general election, 2022
Party	Candidate	Votes	%
Republican	Bill Hager	7,345	53.96
Democratic	Shedron D. Williams (incumbent)	6,259	45.98
Write-in		7	0.05
Total votes		13,611	100.0
Republican gain from Democratic			

=== District 123 ===
District 123 general election, 2022
Party	Candidate	Votes	%
Republican	Jeff Bradley (incumbent)	13,455	92.38
Write-in		1,110	7.62
Total votes		14,565	100.0
Republican hold			

=== District 124 ===
District 124 general election, 2022
Party	Candidate	Votes	%
Republican	Shannon Erickson (incumbent)	9,180	62.77
Democratic	Barb Nash	5,432	37.14
Write-in		13	0.09
Total votes		14,625	100.0
Republican hold			

== See also ==
- 2022 South Carolina elections
