= Tunnel vision (disambiguation) =

Tunnel vision is the loss of peripheral vision

Tunnel vision or Tunnel Vision may also refer to:

- Tunnel vision (metaphor), the reluctance to consider alternatives to one's preferred line of thought
- Tunnel vision (marksmanship), when a shooter is focused on a target, and thus misses what goes on around that target

== Music ==
=== Albums ===
- Tunnel Vision (Tunnel Rats album), 2001
- Tunnel Vision (Beach Bunny album), 2025
- Tunnel Vision (EP), by Itzy, 2025
- Tunnel Vision, by Bishop Lamont, 2019

=== Songs ===
- "Tunnel Vision" (Justin Timberlake song), 2013
- "Tunnel Vision" (Kodak Black song), 2017
- "Tunnel Vision" (Pop Smoke song), 2020
- "Tunnel Vision" (Itzy song), 2025
- "Tunnel Vision", by Beach Bunny from Tunnel Vision, 2025
- "Tunnel Vision", by Circa Survive from The Amulet, 2017
- "Tunnel Vision", by Lenny Kravitz from Circus, 1995
- "Tunnel Vision", by Magdalena Bay from Imaginal Disk, 2024
- "Tunnel Vision", by Melanie Martinez from Portals, 2023
- "Tunnel Vision", by Rina Sawayama from Rina (EP), 2015

== Film and television ==
- Tunnel Vision (1976 film), a comedy anthology film
- Tunnel Vision (1995 film), an Australian film
- "Tunnel Vision" (CSI: Miami), a 2008 television episode
- "Tunnel Vision" (Doctors), a 2003 television episode

== Other uses ==
- Tunnelvision, a 1975 mural by Blue Sky
- Tunnel Vision, a 2007 novel by Shandana Minhas
- Tunnel Vision: Trial & Error, a 2002 book by Robert O. Marshall
