= Prom Queen (disambiguation) =

Prom Queen is an honorary title at a high school prom.

Prom Queen may also refer to:

== Television ==
- Prom Queen (web series), a 2007 series of short online episodes
  - Prom Queen: Summer Heat
- Prom Queens (TV series), a 2012 American reality series
- Prom Queen: The Marc Hall Story, a 2004 Canadian TV movie
- "Prom Queen" (Big Love), a 2009 episode
- "Prom Queen" (Glee), a 2011 episode

== Music ==
- "Prom Queen" (Lil Wayne song), 2009
- "Prom Queen" (Beach Bunny song), 2018
  - Prom Queen, an EP by Beach Bunny, 2018
- "Prom Queen", a song by Insane Clown Posse from Tunnel of Love, 1996
- "Prom Queen", a song by Mambo Taxi, 1993
- "Prom Queen", a song by Molly Kate Kestner, 2017

== See also ==
- Prom (disambiguation)
