= Yaghjian =

Yaghjian, or Yahjian (Armenian: Յաղճյան, derived from Turkish yağcı [yağ "fat/oil/butter/lard" + cı "agentive/profession suffix"], meaning "oil/butter seller") is a surname of Armenian origin. Notable people with the surname include:

- Arthur D. Yaghjian (born 1943), American electrical engineer
- Candy Yaghjian Waites (born 1943), American former politician
- Edmund Yaghjian (1903–1997), Armenian-born American painter, educator
- Kurt Yaghjian (born 1951), American actor
