= William Crosby =

William Crosby may refer to:

- William G. Crosby (1805–1881), American politician and former Governor of Maine
- William Holmes Crosby Jr. (1914–2005), doctor, inventor and poet, considered a founding fathers of modern hematology
- William Otis Crosby (1850–1925), American geologist and engineer
- Bill Crosby (politician) (born 1937), American politician in the South Carolina House of Representatives
- William C. Crosby, American tennis player in U.S. Pro Tennis Championships draws, 1946–1967

== See also ==
- Bill Cosby (born 1937), American comedian and actor
