= Yellow Hearts =

2019 debut single by Ant Saunders

Single by Ant Saunders

from the EP Bubble
- Released: October 18, 2019
- Genre: Indie pop; R&B
- Length: 3:43
- Label: Arista
- Songwriter(s): Anthony (Ant) Saunders
- Producer(s): Anthony (Ant) Saunders

Ant Saunders singles chronology
"Dial Tone" (2019)	"Yellow Hearts" (2019)	"U Know It's Real" (2020)

"Yellow Hearts" is the debut single by American pop singer Ant Saunders which was self-released on October 18, 2019, and re-released by Arista Records in November 2019. The song gained popularity on the video-sharing platform TikTok, which led to it gaining over 100 million streams across all platforms collectively.

== Reception ==
The song later went viral on TikTok in November 2019, along with many other indie pop songs such as Beach Bunny's single "Prom Queen."

== Music video ==
Saunders released the Idle House directed music video for the track on December 10, 2019.

== Credits and personnel ==
Credits adapted from Tidal.

- Anthony Saunders – vocals, songwriting, production

Audrey Mika version

- Anthony Saunders – vocals, songwriting, production
- Audrey Mika Armacost – vocals, songwriting
- Amisha Mallick Sarkar – songwriting
- Nathaniel Alford – vocal production
- Dale Becker – mastering
- Armin Lopez – assistant engineering

== Charts ==
Chart (2019–2020)	Peak position
Australia (ARIA)	37
Belgium (Ultratip Bubbling Under Flanders)	16
Canada (Canadian Hot 100)	53
Ireland (IRMA)	43
Lithuania (AGATA)	34
New Zealand (Recorded Music NZ)	27
Portugal (AFP)	145
Singapore (RIAS)	30
Sweden Heatseeker (Sverigetopplistan)	3
UK Singles (OCC)	64
US Billboard Hot 100	81
US Mainstream Top 40 (Billboard)	32
US Rolling Stone Top 100	41

== Certifications ==
Region	Certification	Certified units/sales
Australia (ARIA)	Gold	35,000^{‡}
Canada (Music Canada)	Gold	40,000^{‡}
New Zealand (RMNZ)	Platinum	30,000^{‡}
United States (RIAA)	Platinum	1,000,000^{‡}
^{‡} Sales+streaming figures based on certification alone.

== Release history ==
Region	Date	Format	Label	Ref.
Various	October 18, 2019	Digital download; streaming	Self-released	
Australia	November 29, 2019	Contemporary hit radio	Arista; Sony	
United States	December 10, 2019	Contemporary hit radio	Arista	
Italy	December 13, 2019	Contemporary hit radio	Sony	
