= Dream Boy (song) =

Single by Beach Bunny

from the album Honeymoon
- Released: October 31, 2019
- Studio: Electrical Audio (Chicago)
- Genre: Indie pop; pop punk
- Length: 2:21
- Label: Mom + Pop
- Songwriter: Lili Trifilio
- Producer: Joe Reinhart

Beach Bunny singles chronology
| "Painkiller" (2018) | "Dream Boy" (2019) | "Ms. California" (2019) |

"Dream Boy" is a song recorded by American rock band Beach Bunny. The song was released on October 31, 2019, as the lead single from the group's debut studio album Honeymoon.

== Background ==
Trifilio had this to say about the song in a press release:

[The song] is an anthem of change in perspective. Instead of viewing love as difficult the listener begins to open up to the possibility that just because the past was painful, doesn't mean the future has to be.

The song's music video was directed by Matt Gehl of Chicago-based filmmaking agency Everybody's Baby. Ben Kaye at Consequence of Sound described it as a combination of the work of John Hughes and the film Eighth Grade.

== Reception ==
Writing for Consequence of Sound, Ben Kaye said the song "[oozes] with the optimism of a young romantic daydreamer, the track uses pounding percussion and breezily beatific guitar lines to push aside loneliness."

== Release history ==
Release history for "Dream Boy"
| Region | Date | Format(s) | Ref. |
|---|---|---|---|
| Various | October 31, 2019 | Digital download; streaming | |
| United States | February 11, 2020 | Alternative radio | |
