= Blame Game (EP) =

EP by Beach Bunny
- Released: January 15, 2021
- Recorded: August–September 2020 (Note: Sources differ on when Blame Game was recorded. Robin Murray of Clash wrote that the EP was recorded "across one week in August", and American Songwriter's Madeline Crone and Consequence's Wren Graves corroborated the month. Lili Trifilio said in an interview for Riot Fest that the EP was recorded in early September, and Adam Lukach of the Chicago Tribune wrote in an article published September 14, 2020 that the band had "recently" returned to the studio.)
- Studio: Electrical Audio (Chicago)
- Genres: Indie pop; guitar pop
- Length: 13:49
- Label: Mom + Pop
- Producer: Joe Reinhart

Beach Bunny chronology
Honeymoon (2020)	Blame Game (2021)	Emotional Creature (2022)

Singles from Blame Game
- 1. "Good Girls (Don't Get Used)" Released: November 30, 2020

Blame Game is the fifth extended play by American rock band Beach Bunny, released on January 15, 2021 via Mom + Pop Music. It was recorded after the band's tour in support of their debut album, Honeymoon (2020), was cut short because of the COVID-19 pandemic. Blame Game is an indie pop and guitar pop EP, covering lyrical themes such as toxic masculinity and sexism. All music was written by frontwoman Lili Trifilio, and it was produced by Joe Reinhart.

Blame Game was supported by one single, "Good Girls (Don't Get Used)", released on November 30, 2020. It received generally positive reviews from music critics, who compared it positively to Honeymoon. The record reached the ninth position on both the US Heatseekers Albums chart and the UK Physical Singles chart.

== Background and release ==
Beach Bunny released their debut studio album Honeymoon in 2020, and planned to embark on an international concert tour in support of the album. However, these plans were cut short due to the COVID-19 pandemic and its ensuing quarantines. According to Lili Trifilio, the frontwoman of Beach Bunny, she had previously begun drafting Blame Game in December 2019. However, the band had not planned on working on the EP, as they had planned to spend the year promoting Honeymoon. Over the following months, she fleshed out the tracks and would send them to the rest of the band. However, Trifilio felt that "no one was really thinking about the next project in the moment", and she instead pursued solo projects under the alias Tiger Lili.

The band began to practice together again in the second quarter of 2020. Later that year, Blame Game was recorded at Electrical Audio in August or September. Jon Alvarado described the recording process for Blame Game as being more relaxed than the one for Honeymoon, due to the EP having fewer tracks and the band having greater focus. On November 30, Beach Bunny announced the EP and released "Good Girls (Don't Get Used)" as its lead single. Trifilio explained that releasing "Good Girls (Don't Get Used)" as the lead single "just felt like an obvious choice since the first time we jammed it", citing its high energy and catchy melody. The single was accompanied by a music video directed by Lua Borges and produced by Everybody's Baby. Beach Bunny also performed the track on Jimmy Kimmel Live! on January 13, 2021, in the band's TV debut. Blame Game was released two days later on January 15. A music video for the EP's title track was released on the same day.

== Music and lyrics ==
Blame Game has been described as an indie pop and guitar pop record. Caleb Campbell of Under the Radar described the EP's sound as a combination of pop-punk, indie rock, and power pop; Mikael Wood of the Los Angeles Times wrote that the EP was sonically reminiscent of That Dog and Paramore. The arrangements on Blame Game were described by Timothy Monger of AllMusic as "crunchy" and "pop-driven". Thematically, Trifilio said that the EP's four songs all shared the same message, being "very angry girl pop, like anti-toxic masculinity". American Songwriter's Madeline Crone and Monger also identified sexism and unstable relationships as overarching themes on the record.

"Good Girls (Don't Get Used)" is a power pop track which Trifilio wrote in five minutes. Crone identified it as a "punchy-pop" track with prominent percussion, while Dave Beech of The Line of Best Fit described it as a "snotty and sugary call-to-arms". Jason Lipshutz of Billboard described the lyrics as "dismiss[ing] emotionally unavailable partners", while both Crone and Connor McInerney of Flood Magazine instead saw the lyrics as a critique on womanizers. McInerney called "Love Sick" a "jangle-pop indebted" track. Campbell highlighted the track's "playful guitar tone switch-ups" and thick bassline. He called it the EP's rawest depiction of how manipulative men can bring about pain, noting how the subject of the song is about the anger felt over lost love rather than the sorrow.

Entertainment Weekly's Eli Enis wrote that the lyrics of "Nice Guys" were blunt in their condemnation of "softboy mind games". McInerney further stated that the lyrics criticized the cliché of men receiving sex through flirting, highlighting the line "You win me like a trophy / Not a consolation prize". Crone noted how its instrumentation demonstrated the band's "sonic growth"; for example, the track includes a guitar line provided by Vaccaro, despite him being a bassist. "Blame Game" is a punk song. It begins with verses exhibiting, as described by Campbell, a "jangly indie pop style", before it takes on the style of a protest chant 80 seconds in. Trifilio explained that the track's themes of sexism, misogyny, and gender norms were things she regularly faced as a woman, and called its writing process therapeutic.

== Reception ==
Professional ratings
Review scores
Source	Rating
AllMusic	4/5 stars
Flood Magazine	8/10
The Line of Best Fit	8.5/10
Under the Radar	8.5/10

Blame Game received generally positive reviews from music critics. Several critics compared it to the band's previous album, Honeymoon. Beech and Campbell both described the record as confident and "technicolor", with the former adding that it "takes everything that made [Honeymoon] so irresistible and amps it up". Danielle Chelosky of Spin and McInerney took note of the EP's honesty, identifying it as a remnant from Honeymoon. Additionally, both critics found the tone of Blame Game to be more aggressive than their previous album. Monger praised Trifilio's optimistic songwriting despite the heavy subject matters and her vocal performance, calling it "another solid entry in the Beach Bunny canon" whether or not it was indicative of the band's future sound.

In the United States, the EP peaked at No. 9 on Billboard's Heatseekers Albums chart and at No. 63 on its Top Album Sales chart. Blame Game also reached No. 9 in the United Kingdom on the Physical Singles chart.

== Track listing ==
All tracks are written by Lili Trifilio.

No.	Title	Length
1.	"Good Girls (Don't Get Used)"	3:35
2.	"Love Sick"	3:38
3.	"Nice Guys"	3:02
4.	"Blame Game"	3:34
Total length:		13:49

== Personnel ==
Credits are adapted from the album's liner notes.

Beach Bunny

- Lili Trifilio – vocals, guitar, songwriting
- Jon Alvarado – drums
- Matt Henkels – guitar
- Anthony Vaccaro – bass

Additional personnel

- Joe Reinhart – production, mixing
- Ryan Schwabe – mastering
- TJ de Blois – drum technician
- Stephanie Priscilla – artwork

== Charts ==
Chart performance for Honeymoon
Chart (2020)	Peak position
UK Physical Singles (Official Charts)	9
US Top Album Sales (Billboard)	63
US Heatseekers Albums (Billboard)	9
