= John Hancock LaFitte Jr. =

American politician (1936–2018)

John H. LaFitte Jr.

Member of the South Carolina House of Representatives from the 76th district
- In office 1972 – August 26, 1975
- Succeeded by: Joyce Hearn

Personal details
- Born: John Hancock LaFitte Jr. June 25, 1936 Columbia, South Carolina
- Died: October 8, 2018 (aged 82) Columbia, South Carolina
- Party: Republican
- Spouse: Emmie Haynes
- Education: University of South Carolina
- Occupation: contractor

Military service
- Allegiance: United States
- Branch/service: United States Marine Corps

John Hancock LaFitte Jr. (June 25, 1936 – October 8, 2018) was an American politician in the state of South Carolina. He served in the South Carolina House of Representatives as a member of the Republican Party from 1972 to 1975, representing Richland County, South Carolina. He was a general contractor and builder.
