= Michele Demery =

American politician

Member of the South Carolina House of Representatives from the 64th district
- Incumbent
- Assumed office December 2026
- Preceded by: Fawn Pedalino

Personal details
- Party: Democratic

Michele Johnson Demery is an American politician of the Democratic Party. She is the member-elect of the South Carolina House of Representatives representing District 64.

== Early life and career ==
Demery lives in Clarendon County, South Carolina and is a special education teacher in Berkeley County, South Carolina.

== Political career ==
=== 2026 South Carolina House of Representatives election ===
Demery defeated Jack Spann in the June Primary to become the Democratic nominee. Both filed during a special filing period created by the South Carolina Democratic Party after the person who originally filed withdrew his application.

In the 2026 general election, Demery defeated Republican incumbent Fawn Pedalino
