= Prom (disambiguation) =

A prom is a dance party of high school students.

Prom, Proms or The Prom may also refer to:

- Programmable ROM, a form of digital memory
- BBC Proms, an annual summer season of daily classical music concerts in London

== Arts and entertainment ==
=== Film ===
- Prom (film), a 2011 teen comedy from Walt Disney Pictures
- The Prom (film), a 2020 American musical comedy film
- Flawless (2018 film) (Hebrew: הנשף, Haneshef, 'Prom'), a 2018 Israeli drama film

=== Television ===
- "The Prom" (Saved by the Bell), a 1990 episode
- "The Prom" (Buffy the Vampire Slayer), a 1999 episode
- "Prom" (The Secret Circle), a 2012 episode

=== Music ===
- Prom (album), by Amy Ray, 2005
- The Prom (band), an American indie band
- "Prom", a song by Mindless Self Indulgence from the 2005 album You'll Rebel to Anything
- "Prom", a song by SZA from the 2017 album Ctrl
- "Prom", a song by Vulfpeck from the 2011 album Mit Peck

=== Other uses in arts and entertainment ===
- Prom, a 2005 novel by Laurie Halse Anderson
- The Prom (musical), 2016

== Medicine ==
- Passive range of motion exercises, in physical therapy
- Patient reported outcome measures
- Prelabor rupture of membranes, in obstetrics

== Other uses ==
- PROM-1, an antipersonnel mine
- Phosphate rich organic manure
- The Prom, or Wilsons Promontory National Park, in Victoria, Australia
- La Prom, nickname of the Promenade des Anglais in Nice, France

== See also ==
- Prom Night (disambiguation)
- Prom Queen (disambiguation)
- Promenade (disambiguation)
