= Jim Harrison (South Carolina politician) =

American lawyer and politician (born 1951)

Member of the South Carolina House of Representatives from the 75th district
- In office December 1994 – December 4, 2012
- Preceded by: Candy Waites
- Succeeded by: Kirkman Finlay III

Member of the South Carolina House of Representatives from the 76th district
- In office December 1990 – December 1994
- Preceded by: Joyce Hearn
- Succeeded by: Leon Howard

Personal details
- Born: James Hodges Harrison; April 11, 1951 (age 75) Greenwood, South Carolina, U.S.
- Party: Republican
- Spouse: Susan
- Education: The Citadel; University of South Carolina

Military service
- Allegiance: United States
- Branch/service: United States Army
- Years of service: 1973–2003
- Rank: Colonel
- Unit: U.S. Army Reserve
- Awards: Legion of Merit; Bronze Star Medal

James Hodges Harrison (born April 11, 1951) is an American lawyer and politician.

== Political career ==
Harrison served in the South Carolina House of Representatives from 1990 to 2012 and, at his retirement, was chairman of the House's judiciary committee.

In 2018, during the South Carolina Statehouse corruption investigation, Harrison was found guilty of multiple charges related to public corruption.
