= Prom Night =

Prom Night may refer to:

- Prom, a dance party of high school students
- Prom Night (film series), a Canadian horror film franchise of five films
  - Prom Night (1980 film), starring Jamie Lee Curtis and Leslie Nielsen
    - Prom Night: Original Soundtrack from the Motion Picture, a soundtrack album
  - Prom Night (2008 film), a loose remake of the 1980 film, starring Brittany Snow and Idris Elba
- "Prom Night" (That '70s Show), an episode of the American comedy
- "Prom Night" (Full House), an episode of the American sitcom
- "Prom Night!", an episode of the American TV series Supergirl
- "Prom Night", a song by Anamanaguchi from the 2013 album Endless Fantasy
- "Prom Night", a 2012 song by Jeffree Star
- Prom Night (Ireland), a humorous reference to the 2013 liquidation of the Irish Bank Resolution Corporation

== See also ==
- Prom (disambiguation)
