= Emotional Creature =

Studio album by Beach Bunny
- Released: July 22, 2022
- Studios: Shirk Studio, Om Sound Studio
- Length: 35:36
- Label: Mom + Pop
- Producer: Sean O'Keefe

Beach Bunny chronology
Blame Game (2021)	Emotional Creature (2022)	Tunnel Vision (2025)

Singles from Emotional Creature
- 1. "Oxygen" Released: October 27, 2021; 2. "Fire Escape" Released: March 29, 2022; 3. "Karaoke" Released: May 4, 2022; 4. "Entropy" Released: June 8, 2022; 5. "Weeds" Released: July 20, 2022

Professional ratings
Aggregate scores
Source	Rating
Metacritic	77/100
Review scores
Source	Rating
AllMusic	4/5 stars
Dork	4/5 stars
Pitchfork	6.3/10
Paste	8.0/10
Rolling Stone	4/5 stars
Sputnikmusic	3.5/5

Emotional Creature is the second studio album by American indie rock band Beach Bunny. It was released on July 22, 2022, via Mom + Pop. This also marks the final album that features lead guitarist Matt Henkels. The album was produced by Fall Out Boy producer Sean O'Keefe.

== Track listing ==
All tracks are written by Lili Trifilio, Jon Alvarado, Anthony Vaccaro, and Matt Henkels.

Emotional Creature track listing
No.	Title	Length
1.	"Entropy"	3:41
2.	"Oxygen"	3:10
3.	"Deadweight"	2:28
4.	"Gone"	2:59
5.	"Eventually"	2:06
6.	"Fire Escape"	2:20
7.	"Weeds"	3:22
8.	"Gravity"	1:35
9.	"Scream"	4:04
10.	"Infinity Room"	1:10
11.	"Karaoke"	3:17
12.	"Love Song"	5:44
Total length:		35:36

== Charts ==
Chart performance for Emotional Creature
Chart (2022)	Peak position
UK Independent Album Breakers (Official Charts)	19
UK Record Store Albums (Official Charts)	38
US Heatseekers Albums (Billboard)	1
US Independent Albums (Billboard)	44
US Top Album Sales (Billboard)	19
