= Blue Sky (artist) =

American painter

Blue Sky (formerly Warren Edward Johnson) is an American painter and sculptor best known for his mural, Tunnelvision.

== Biography ==
Blue Sky was born on September 18, 1938, in Columbia, South Carolina, as Warren Edward Johnson. In 1954, his first foray into art won him a national poster competition two years before he graduated from Dreher High School. He designed and drew the Dreher Blue Devil used by the school. For the next six years, he served as a jet aircraft technician in the Air National Guard, 169th Cameron Squad, while working several different jobs to pay for college – including as a parade float builder, a layout artist, and a dance instructor, among others.

Sky attended the University of South Carolina from 1958 to 1964. During this time, he received instruction from the Ash Can painter Edmund Yaghjian. Meanwhile, he sold original works through USC student art auctions at McMaster College. At the Springs Mills Show in 1964, in which over 700 artists participated, he was judged "best of show" by Henry Geldzahler, who was then curator of modern art at the Metropolitan Museum. Sky was then invited to study at the Art Students League of New York, where he lived and worked for the next year.

Upon moving back to Columbia in 1966, Sky worked as a draftsman and conceptual artist for Wilbur Smith & Associates before returning to USC for graduate school. In 1970, he graduated, earning a Master of Education because the university had not yet been certified to award a Master of Fine Arts.

In 1974, Sky legally changed his name from Warren Edward Johnson to Blue Sky. He signed paintings before this year with the abbreviation "WAR."

In 2000, Sky was awarded the Order of the Palmetto, South Carolina's highest civilian state honor, for his contributions to the arts - particularly for painting the state's first large-scale public mural in 1975.

== Career ==
Sky has been solely supported by his art since 1970. Although he is best known for his public art, many of his public projects are self-funded, and his living is earned primarily through the sale of original artwork through the Blue Sky Gallery, which is currently located in the renovated Arcade Mall in Columbia, SC.

== Tunnelvision (1975) ==
Sometime after graduating, Sky took an interest in painting a mural on the wall of the Federal Land Bank in Columbia.34.006753°N 81.03203°W He applied to the South Carolina Arts Commission several times before they accepted his concept design for Tunnelvision and told him to approach the Federal Land Bank for funding. The bank refused to fund the project, but agreed to grant him permission to use the wall on the condition that he wasn't a communist (see: Diego Rivera).

Sky claims that the idea for Tunnelvision appeared to him in a dream. Although the work is technically rendered in trompe-l'œil style, Sky intended the mural to have a spiritual impact as well: a "window" to transcendental reality. Sky has restored and fully repainted the mural five times, and each version has featured at least one new element to extend the metaphor; for example, the most recent addition, a street sign which reads, "One Way." Tunnelvision has earned Sky the widest recognition, starting with an article in a 1976 issue of People magazine.

== Public murals ==
- Tunnelvision - AgFirst Farm Credit Bank - Columbia, SC (1975)
- Moonlight on the Great Pee Dee - John L. McMillan Federal Building and U.S. Courthouse - Florence, SC (1978)
- Overflow Parking - Flint Journal Building - Flint, MI (1978)
- Winter Beach - Sumter, SC (1980)
- Spirit of the Air - Charlotte, NC (1982)
- Incident at the Kirkwood Hotel - Camden, SC (1982)
- Old Darlington Public Square - Bicentennial mural - Darlington, SC (1985)
- The River Jordan - Three Fountains Church - Springdale, SC (1987)
- Full Moon Over the River Jordan - New Hope Church - Pelion, SC (1988)
- Gervais Street Extension - South Carolina State Museum - Columbia, SC (1989)
- Five Points - 1948 - Harper's Restaurant - Columbia, SC (1991)
- Man Escapes - Satchel Ford Elementary School - Columbia, SC (1994)
- Partly Cloudy - Azzurro's Restaurant - Richmond, VA (1994)
- University of South Carolina - USC Visitors Center - Columbia, SC (1994)
- Night Train - Fort Pierce, FL (1995)
- Cayce Historical Museum Mural - Cayce, SC (1996)
- Overflow - Crayton Middle School - Columbia, SC (1997)
- Adopt Us - Animal Shelter mural and sculpture - Columbia, SC (1999)
- The Other Side of the Tunnel - AgFirst Farm Credit Bank - Columbia, SC (2000)
- Congaree Swamp - Congaree National Park - Columbia, SC (2002)
- Union Mural - Keepsake Jewelers - Union, SC (2008)

== Public sculptures ==
- This is not a tree - Columbia Steel Palmetto Tree - Columbia, SC (2000)
- NEVERBUST - Main Street - Columbia, SC (2000)
- Busted Plug Plaza - AgFirst Farm Credit Bank - Columbia, SC (2001)
- Ped-Xing - Richland Cultural Council doors project - Richland County, SC (2002)
- Kawasakisaurus - South Carolina Bank and Trust - Columbia, SC (2003)
