= Promenade (disambiguation) =

A promenade is a long, open, level area, usually next to a river or large body of water, where people may walk.

Promenade may refer to:

== Dance ==
- Promenade (dance move), a basic dance move in a number of dances
- Prom, or promenade dance, a formal/semi-formal dance party of high school students
- Western promenade dance, a form of partner dance
- Promenade position, a dance position in ballroom and other dances

== Music ==
=== Classical music and performances ===
- Promenade concert, concerts originally in the pleasure gardens of 18th/19th century London
  - The Proms, an annual series of daily classical music concerts in the Royal Albert Hall
- Promenade (musical), a 1965 musical by María Irene Fornés and Rev. Al Carmines
- Promenade I, by Stephen Dodgson
- "Promenade", a recurring movement in Pictures at an Exhibition by Mussorgsky
- "Promenade", by George Gershwin, originally titled "Walking the Dog (Gershwin)" as a musical number for Shall We Dance (1937)

=== Albums and songs ===
- Promenade (The Divine Comedy album), 1994
- Promenade (Kevin Burke and Mícheál Ó Domhnaill album), 1979
- Promenade (Street Sweeper Social Club song), 2010
- "Promenade", a song by Everclear from the 2012 album Invisible Stars
- "Promenade", a song by U2 from the 1984 album The Unforgettable Fire
- "Promenade", a song by Underground Lovers from the 1992 album Leaves Me Blind
- "Promenade", a 1976 song by Herb Alpert
- "Promenade", a 1945 song by Leroy Anderson

== Places ==
- Promenade MRT station, in Singapore
- Promenade (shopping centre), in Thornhill, Ontario, Canada
- Fashion Island & The Promenade, commonly known as simply Fashion Island (Bangkok)

== Other uses ==
- Promenade deck, a deck found on several types of passenger ships and riverboats
- La Promenade (Renoir), an 1870 painting
- Promenade, a 2024 video game by Holy Cap

== See also ==
- Prom (disambiguation)
- Promenade Mall (disambiguation)
- Promenade des Anglais, in Nice, France
