= Joyce Hearn =

American politician (1929–2021)

Member of the South Carolina House of Representatives from the 76th district
- In office 1975–1990
- Preceded by: John Hancock LaFitte Jr.
- Succeeded by: Jim Harrison

Personal details
- Born: Joyce Carolyn Camp; June 16, 1929 Cedartown, Georgia
- Died: January 20, 2021 (aged 91) Columbia, South Carolina
- Party: Republican
- Spouse: Thomas Harry Hearn
- Children: three daughters
- Education: Ohio State University
- Occupation: businesswoman, educator

Joyce Carolyn Hearn (née Camp; June 16, 1929 – January 20, 2021) was an American politician in the state of South Carolina. She served in the South Carolina House of Representatives as a member of the Republican Party from 1975 to 1990, representing Richland County, South Carolina. She was a businesswoman and educator.

Hearn was born in Cedartown, Georgia. She went to the University of West Georgia and University of Georgia. Hearn graduated from Ohio State University. She taught at the Eau Claire High School in Columbia, South Carolina.
