= Krystle Matthews =

Former American politician (born 1981)

Member of the South Carolina House of Representatives from the 117th district
- In office November 12, 2018 – November 14, 2022
- Preceded by: Bill Crosby
- Succeeded by: Jordan Pace

Personal details
- Born: Krystle Simmons; February 27, 1981 (age 45) Sandusky, Ohio, U.S.
- Party: Democratic
- Children: 5
- Education: University of Cincinnati (attended); Trident Technical College (attended); Bowling Green State University (AA)

Krystle N. Matthews (née Simmons; born February 27, 1981) is an American former politician and engineering planner. She was a member of the South Carolina House of Representatives from the 117th district, serving from 2018 to 2022. She is a member of the Democratic Party.

== Political career ==
=== South Carolina House of Representatives 2018 ===
Matthews was elected to the South Carolina House of Representatives in 2018, defeating incumbent Republican Bill Crosby. This made her the first Black woman to represent this district.

Matthews was a member of the Medical, Military, Public, and Municipal Affairs committee, and of the Operations and Management committee.

=== US Senate race 2022 ===
On April 12, 2021, Matthews announced her candidacy in the 2022 election for South Carolina's Class 3 seat in the United States Senate.

==== June 2022 phone recording ====
On June 26, 2022, audio of a prison phone call was released by the far-right activist group Project Veritas. On the recording, Matthews expresses a desire to accept money from drug dealers to fund her campaign and also calls for Democrats to run as "secret sleepers" in Republican primaries. She also instructed the inmate to use the name of somebody in their family rather than their own name, without the knowledge of the family member, when making the donation. Matthews won the primary runoff two days later. In reference to the recording, Matthews said, “Nothing I said was untrue. And everything I said are also things that I’ve already talked about throughout my campaign. I don't run from anything.” She described the phone call with the inmate as "tongue-in-cheek" and argued that she was not advocating for any illegal activities. She apologized for her language in a private conversation. Matthews won the Democratic primary in a June 28 runoff.

==== September 2022 recording ====
On September 8, 2022, Project Veritas again obtained a recording of Matthews making statements about White people, resulting in calls for her resignation by South Carolina Attorney General Alan Wilson, a Republican, and State House Representative Justin Bamberg, a fellow Democrat. In the recording, Representative Matthews states, "My district is slightly Republican, and it's heavily White. I'm no stranger to White people, I'm from a mostly White town. And let me tell you one thing. You oughta know who you're dealing with, like -- you gotta treat them like shit, like I mean that’s the only way they’ll respect you. I keep them right here, like under my thumbs. That's where I keep it. You have to, otherwise they get out of control, like kids." In a statement, Matthews confirmed that her voice is heard in the recording, but she characterized the audio as a misleading edit by a "satirical MAGA Powered news outlet" of a "tongue-in-cheek" exchange.

=== South Carolina House race 2022 ===
See also: 2022 South Carolina House of Representatives election, 2022 United States state legislative elections

In the 2022 general election, Matthews ran in two races simultaneously: the US Senate and the South Carolina House of Representatives races. She lost the Senate race to incumbent Tim Scott, and the South Carolina House of Representatives race to Republican challenger Jordan Pace. Matthews' 2022 simultaneous run in two races was mentioned in 2026 news coverage of the Special Republican Primary sparked by the death of US Senator Lindsey Graham during the 2026 United States Senate election in South Carolina.

== Personal life ==
Matthews was born in Sandusky, Ohio and graduated from Sandusky High School in 1999. She currently resides in Ladson, South Carolina and has five children. She worked as an engineering planner until 2021.

== Electoral history ==
=== South Carolina House of Representatives ===
Matthews was the only Democrat in her district to run in 2018, so there was no Democratic primary.

South Carolina House of Representatives District 117 General Election, 2018
Party	Candidate	Votes	%
Democratic	Krystle Matthews	5,577	53.5
Republican	Bill Crosby (incumbent)	4,842	46.4
Total votes		10,434	100.0
Democratic gain from Republican			

Matthews was the only Democrat in her district to run in 2020, so there was no Democratic primary.

South Carolina House of Representatives District 117 General Election, 2020
Party	Candidate	Votes	%
Democratic	Krystle Matthews (incumbent)	8,902	52.62
Republican	Jordan Pace	7,998	47.28
Total votes		16,916	100.0
Democratic hold			

Matthews was the only Democrat in her district to run in 2022, so there was no Democratic primary.

South Carolina House of Representatives District 117 General Election, 2022
Party	Candidate	Votes	%
Republican	Jordan Pace	8,515	63.55
Democratic	Krystle Matthews (incumbent)	4,874	36.38
Total votes		13,399	100.0
Republican gain from Democratic			

=== United States Senate ===
2022 United States Senate election in South Carolina
Party	Candidate	Votes	%
Republican	Tim Scott (incumbent)	1,066,274	62.88
Democratic	Krystle Matthews	627,616	37.01
Write-in		1,812	0.11
Total votes		1,695,702	100.0
Republican hold			

== See also ==
- Black women in American politics
- List of African-American United States Senate candidates

Party political offices
Preceded by Thomas Dixon	Democratic nominee for U.S. Senator from South Carolina (Class 3); 2022	Incumbent
