= Honeymoon (Beach Bunny album) =

Studio album by Beach Bunny
- Released: February 14, 2020
- Recorded: Early 2019
- Studio: Electrical Audio (Chicago)
- Genres: Power pop; indie pop; pop-punk
- Length: 25:00
- Label: Mom + Pop
- Producer: Joe Reinhart

Beach Bunny chronology
Prom Queen (2018)	Honeymoon (2020)	Blame Game (2021)

Singles from Honeymoon
- 1. "Dream Boy" Released: October 31, 2019; 2. "Ms. California" Released: December 6, 2019; 3. "Cloud 9" Released: January 10, 2020; 4. "Promises" Released: February 7, 2020

Honeymoon is the debut studio album by American rock band Beach Bunny, released on February 14, 2020 through Mom + Pop Music. The album was primarily written in 2018, when frontwoman Lili Trifilio was "going through a lot of life changes" including a breakup; it was subsequently recorded in the first half of 2019 at Electrical Audio. Musically, Honeymoon is a power pop, indie pop, and pop-punk album which explores a wide range of topics related to romance; Trifilio explained how the record aimed to tackle every emotion a person may experience at the end of a relationship's honeymoon period. Its lyrics were written by Trifilio, its music was composed by the entire band, and it was produced by Joe Reinhart.

Honeymoon was supported by four singles: "Dream Boy", "Ms. California", "Cloud 9", and "Promises". Music critics praised Honeymoon's production, sound, melodies, and lyrics; it appeared on the year-end lists of several publications. The album reached number 2 on Billboard's Heatseekers Album chart and number 21 on the US Top Alternative Albums chart. Beach Bunny planned to embark on an international tour in support of Honeymoon, but it was cut short due to the COVID-19 pandemic.

== Background and recording ==
In 2015, Lili Trifilio started Beach Bunny as a solo project during a college break. She released several EPs on her own, including Animalism in 2015, Pool Party in 2016, and Crybaby in 2017. Later in 2017, Trifilio turned the project into a band — then consisting of Trifilio, guitarist Matt Henkels, and drummer Jon Alvarado — in order to compete in a battle of the bands. Bassist Aidan Cada also joined in the band in 2017, (Note: Sources disagree as to whether Cada was part of Beach Bunny during the battle of the bands. Nina Corcoran of Stereogum suggested that he was a part of the band, while Greg Kot of the Chicago Tribune wrote that he was not. Lindsay Zoladz of The New York Times noted that Cada played shows with the group in 2017, but did not specify whether he did so during the battle of the bands.) and together the group recorded the 2018 EP Prom Queen. In September 2019, Beach Bunny signed with Mom + Pop Music, after its founder Michael Goldstone had watched one of their shows in December 2018 and remained connected with the band's management. That same year, Cada left the band and was replaced by Anthony Vaccaro.

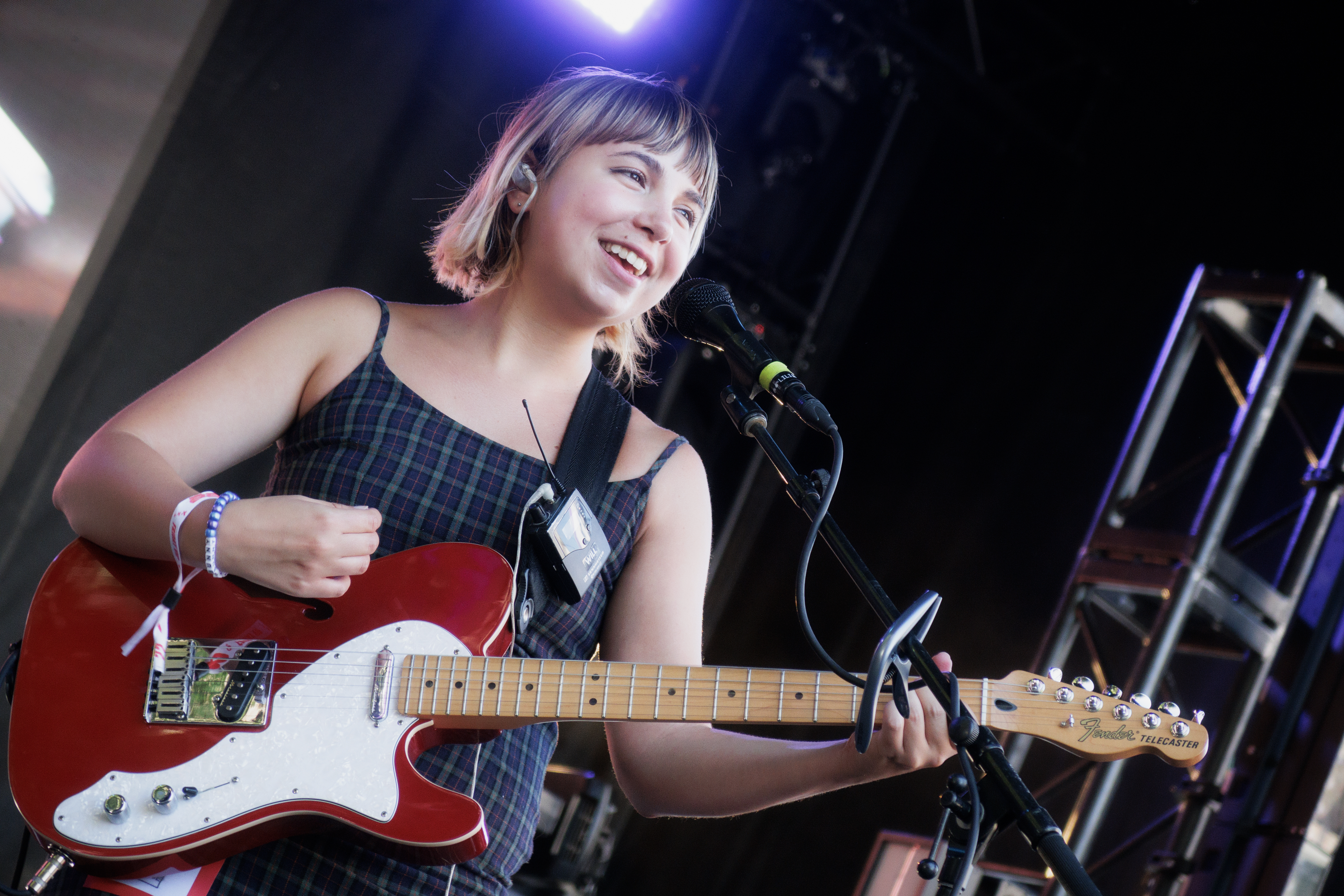
Lili Trifilio (pictured in 2022) wrote most of the lyrics for Honeymoon in 2018 while facing "a lot of life changes".

According to Trifilio, most of Honeymoon was written in 2018 while she was "going through a lot of life changes" including a breakup. The band decided to release the tracks as a studio album instead of as an EP due the quantity of tracks she had written, in addition to it "feeling right [...] at the growth rate things were headed". The record was subsequently recorded at Electrical Audio in the first half of 2019; Vaccaro commented on how the band had originally booked Studio B, however the band was moved to the more-expensive Studio A due to the band Shellac occupying the studio.

== Music and lyrics ==
Honeymoon has been described as power pop, indie pop, and pop-punk, with some of its songs having elements of pop rock; Jon Dolan of Rolling Stone referred to the record as being "emo garage rock". Honeymoon's sound has widely been compared to that of Best Coast. (Note: Attributed to Abby Jones of Pitchfork, Phil Mongredien of The Observer, Steven Edelstone of DIY, and Roisin O'Connor of The Independent.) Abby Jones of Pitchfork additionally compared its sound to that of Charly Bliss, while Roisin O'Connor likened it to Letters to Cleo and Paramore. According to Trifilio, the album's primary theme is romance, and it discusses themes of "dealing with love, loss, and all emotions in between". Trifilio also explained how the record's goal was to cover every theme which a person may experience at the end of a relationship's honeymoon period. However, despite its lyrical rawness, Andy Von Pip of Under the Radar wrote that the album attempted to explore these feelings instead of "wallow[ing] in a state of romanticized misery", thus setting it apart from other albums labeled as sad girl music.

Honeymoon opens with "Promises", a pop punk track with a "polished-yet-indie" sound. The song was originally written in 2017 following a breakup and was intended to appear on Crybaby, but it was continuously reworked over the next years. Trifilio described it as a "true heartbreak anthem", and declared it the "most honest and vulnerable song" on Honeymoon. "Cuffing Season" again has a pop punk sound, in addition to a grunge pop guitar riff Samantha Small of Consequence compared to the 1975. Despite being named after cuffing season, the time of year in which people actively pursue romantic partners, the song is instead about romantic uncertainty and the wish to get away from "unsettling emotions". Dolan called "April" a "cuddle-core ballad", while Small instead categorized it as surf rock. It began as a Christmas song, but Trifilio repurposed its melody to instead discuss wishful thinking and processing the memories of a previous relationship. "April" unintentionally continued a trend of the band naming songs after months.

"Rearview" is played almost entirely solo; Trifilio accompanies herself with a guitar, before the rest of the band joins in the last 30 seconds of the song. The track is about insecurity and one's relationship with themself; Small considered it an emotional crescendo on the album, due to the lyrics no longer being stuck in memories. Mia Hughes of The Line of Best Fit found that the grungy sound of "Ms. California" matched the track's "bright and gluey" melody; Rolling Stone's Jonathan Bernstein likened the song's chord progression to that of "Stacy's Mom". Lyrically, the song is about the jealousy of not having one's affection reciprocated. The pop punk-influenced "Colorblind" has a "push-pull explosiveness" which Dolan stylistically compared to Paramore. Trifilio explained that the track explored an on-and-off relationship where one person continuously apologizes to the other for hurting them, but never changes their behavior.

Both O'Connor and Pete Wild of The Skinny felt that "Racetrack" was evocative of Agnes Obel, with the latter emphasizing the song's "haunting" mood and its piano-led instrumentation. Phil Mongredien of The Observer additionally compared its sound to Big Thief, while Dolan instead likened it to Joanna Newsom's piano poetry. Like "Rearview", "Racetrack" is also about insecurities; however, its focus is instead on one's relationships with others as opposed to with themselves. Instrumentally, "Dream Boy" contains "breezily beatific" guitar lines over a simple beat. The song, which Trifilio explained was about "giving love a second chance", was inspired by romantic comedies and her fond memories of summer in Chicago. The album ends with "Cloud 9", a surf-pop song featuring prominent percussion and a "danceable" bassline over faint guitars. The song was conceived after Trifilio wished to end Honeymoon with a "no strings attached" love song, and she dedicated the track to her deceased pet snail.

== Release and promotion ==
On October 31, 2019, Beach Bunny announced that Honeymoon would be released on February 14, 2020. To support the album, Beach Bunny began a North America tour in November 2019, which was to evolve into the international Honeymoon Tour in 2020; however, due to the COVID-19 pandemic, much of the tour, including appearances at Coachella and Riot Fest, was cancelled.

=== Singles ===
Four singles were released prior to the release of Honeymoon. Its first single, "Dream Boy", was released the same day that the album was announced. It was accompanied by a music video directed by Matt Gehl of Everybody's Baby, which Ben Kaye of Consequence described as being "John Hughes-meets-Eighth Grade". The song was also released to US alternative radio on February 11, 2020. "Ms. California" was the second single from the album, being released on December 6, 2019. An accompanying music video, also directed by Gehl, features the band members each handling a minor problem, such as a parking ticket or an overfilled trash can.

The third single from Honeymoon was "Cloud 9", released on January 10, 2020. An animated music video by Margaret Bialis, described by Carolyn Droke as a "whimsical visual depiction" of a new love, accompanied the single. The song was later released to US alternative radio on April 6, 2021, and a version of the song featuring Tegan and Sara was released ten days later. The fourth and final single of the album, "Promises", was released on February 7, 2020. Its music video, again directed by Everybody's Baby, sees Trifilio continuously awaken in different locations around a city.

=== Commercial performance ===
Honeymoon debuted and peaked at No. 2 on Billboard's Heatseekers Album chart and at No. 25 on the US Top Album Sales chart on February 29, 2020. The album also charted that same week on the Top Alternative Albums chart (No. 21), the Independent Albums chart (No. 27), and the Top Rock Albums chart (No. 38).

== Critical reception ==
Professional ratings
Aggregate scores
Source	Rating
AnyDecentMusic?	7.4/10
Metacritic	78/100
Review scores
Source	Rating
AllMusic	3.5/5 stars
Chicago Tribune	4/4 stars
Consequence	B+
DIY	3.5/5 stars
The Observer	4/5 stars
Paste	8.7/10
Pitchfork	7.0/10
Rolling Stone	4/5 stars
The Skinny	3/5 stars
Under the Radar	8/10 stars

According to the review aggregator Metacritic, Honeymoon received "generally favorable reviews" based on a weighted average score of 78 out of 100 from nine critic scores. Under the Radar's Andy Von Pip praised how the album saw Beach Bunny "take their sound to a whole new level" while maintaining their charm. Kevin Williams of the Chicago Tribune considered the record to be more polished than the band's previous releases, in particular taking notice of the improved production on the tracks without losing the prominence of Trifilio's voice. Similarly, AllMusic's Timothy Monger pointed out how the album's "bolder" production highlighted Trifilio's emotional intensity and "strong melodic sense". The album's emotional intensity was also mentioned by Matt Williams of The A.V. Club, who commented that Trifilio sounded as though she was "bubbling over" with a plethora of feelings on every track, while its melodies garnered attention from Pitchfork's Abby Jones for being "rich" and "surfy".

Steven Edelstone of Paste praised the catchiness of Honeymoon, lauding in particular the simplicity of its compositions and its choruses. He additionally commented that the album was the "best pop-punk album to come around in quite some time". Likewise, The Skinny's Pete Wild wrote that the best songs on the albums were the ones where Beach Bunny embraced a pop punk sound, and suggested that the album had the chance to influence "the next generation of next big things". DIY's Chris Hamilton-Peach praised the variety of sounds on Honeymoon, writing that the band had achieved a perfect balance of "sporadic laid-back moments gelled with raucous vitality". However, despite praising the band's unique sound distinct from artists like Liz Phair and Snail Mail, Small criticized how the songs on Honeymoon felt formulaic, rarely deviating from their "tried-and-true formula of a slow-building verse to a shouted chorus".

The lyrics of Honeymoon widely received praise from reviewers. Dolan lauded the lyricism for being "both archetypal and original", writing how the album made "what could be hand-me-down pop angst feel heartbreakingly new"; Monger similarly concluded that the songs managed to stray from "emo clichés". Both Kevin Williams and Edelston highlighted the universality of the lyrics — the former recognized how Honeymoon's down-to-earth songs had the ability to "cross genders", while the latter suggested that the universality of the album's themes lent Beach Bunny authenticity. Various reviewers pointed out the contrast between the album's upbeat sound and more-despondent lyrics. Hamilton-Peach observed that the band consistently "surg[ed] forward with live-wire verve while glancing back lyrically". Mongredien noted how the album's "lyrical anxieties" were counteracted by "carefree hooks", while Von Pip wrote that the record's melodies and lyrics were "at odds" with each other. Jones considered the lyricism of Honeymoon to be a "level up" from Prom Queen and enjoyed the more confident lyrics on the record, however she criticized some of it for being "too slight" and "superficial".

=== Accolades ===
Accolades for Honeymoon
Publication	Accolade	Rank
Consequence of Sound	Consequence of Sound's Top 50 Albums of 2020	50
Consequence of Sound	Consequence of Sound's Top 25 Albums of 2020 – Mid-Year	21
The New York Times	The New York Times' Best Albums of 2020 (Jon Caramanica)	13
Rolling Stone	Rolling Stone's Best Albums of 2020	21

== Track listing ==
All lyrics are written by Lili Trifilio; all music is composed by Beach Bunny.

Honeymoon track listing
No.	Title	Length
1.	"Promises"	3:51
2.	"Cuffing Season"	2:58
3.	"April"	3:18
4.	"Rearview"	2:48
5.	"Ms. California"	2:52
6.	"Colorblind"	2:25
7.	"Racetrack"	2:00
8.	"Dream Boy"	2:21
9.	"Cloud 9"	2:27
Total length:		25:00

Japan bonus track
No.	Title	Length
10.	"Dream Boy (demo)"

== Personnel ==
Credits adapted from the album's liner notes.

Beach Bunny

- Lili Trifilio – vocals, guitar, piano, artwork
- Matt Henkels – guitar
- Jon Alvarado – drums
- Anthony Vaccaro – bass

Additional personnel

- Joe Reinhart – production, mixing, engineering
- Ryan Schwabe – stem mastering
- TJ de Blois – drum teaching
- Chris Hoffer – coloration
- NY – layout

== Charts ==
Chart performance for Honeymoon
Chart (2020)	Peak position
US Top Album Sales (Billboard)	25
US Top Alternative Albums (Billboard)	21
US Heatseekers Albums (Billboard)	2
US Independent Albums (Billboard)	27
US Top Rock Albums (Billboard)	38
