= Promenade Mall =

Promenade Mall or The Promenade may refer to:

== Canada ==
- Promenade (shopping centre), in Thornhill, Ontario
- Promenades Saint-Bruno, Saint-Bruno, Quebec

== India ==
- DLF Promenade, in Vasant Kunj, Delhi

== United States ==
- Pinnacle Hills Promenade, in Rogers, Arkansas
- Promenade Temecula, in Temecula, California
- Promenade Saucon Valley, in Center Valley, Pennsylvania
- Promenade at Granite Run, in Middletown Township, Delaware County, Pennsylvania
- Promenade on the Peninsula, in Rolling Hills Estates, South Bay area of Greater Los Angeles
- The Promenade (California), a dead shopping mall in Woodland Hills, Los Angeles, California
- The Promenade at Chenal, in Little Rock, Arkansas
- The Promenade at Coconut Creek, in Coconut Creek, Florida
- The Promenade at Howard Hughes Center, in Los Angeles, California
- The Promenade at Sagemore, in Evesham Township, New Jersey
- Third Street Promenade, in Santa Monica, California
- Tulsa Promenade, in Tulsa, Oklahoma

== See also ==
- Promenade (disambiguation)
