= Cloud 9 (Beach Bunny song) =

Single by Beach Bunny

from the album Honeymoon
- Released: January 10, 2020
- Genre: Indie pop
- Length: 2:27
- Label: Mom + Pop
- Songwriter: Lili Trifilio

Beach Bunny singles chronology
"Ms. California" (2019)	"Cloud 9" (2020)	"Promises" (2020)

"Cloud 9" is a song recorded by American rock band Beach Bunny. It was released on January 10, 2020 as the third single from their debut studio album Honeymoon. The song went viral on TikTok in March 2021, which caused it to enter charts in the United States, Canada, Ireland, and the United Kingdom. A remix featuring Canadian duo Tegan and Sara was released on April 16, 2021.

== Composition ==
"Cloud 9" is the closing track on Honeymoon. It is described as "a surprisingly uptempo and motivational number" and "an undeniably giddy love song." The instrumentation is sparse throughout the verses, with guitars mixed low put focus on the drums and the "understated yet danceable bassline". The songs's Strokes-influenced bass solo "demonstrat[es] the band's natural cool even as they throw themselves into passion". In the song, Lili Trifilio sings about the highs of love against a simple indie pop hook, that turns into "a driving force of energy and enthusiasm" when her bandmates come crashing in for the chorus. Trifilo said of the song's lyrics, "I sought out to write a true, gushy, genuine love song when creating 'Cloud 9'. At the time I was at a questionable point in my relationship and I was reflecting on the last few years and how despite the ups and downs, love held us together. I hope that anyone who listens to this song can feel the love in the lyrics and give love a chance, as well as remember to always love themselves first and foremost."

== Music video ==
The song was released with an official animated music video directed by Margaret Bialis. The video features a pink-haired girl who feels down in her luck, until a man appears with flowers, balloons, and "the type of happiness only love can prompt", while also singing to a crowd of snails.

== Charts ==
=== Weekly charts ===
Weekly chart performance for "Cloud 9"
Chart (2021)	Peak position
Canada Hot 100 (Billboard)	92
Global 200 (Billboard)	193
Ireland (IRMA)	58
UK Singles (Official Charts)	64
UK Indie (Official Charts)	8
US Bubbling Under Hot 100 (Billboard)	9
US Hot Rock & Alternative Songs (Billboard)	12
US Rock & Alternative Airplay (Billboard)	42

=== Year-end charts ===
Year-end chart performance for "Cloud 9"
Chart (2021)	Position
US Hot Rock & Alternative Songs (Billboard)	36

== Certifications ==
Certifications for "Cloud 9"
Region	Certification	Certified units/sales
Australia (ARIA)	Gold	35,000^{‡}
New Zealand (RMNZ)	Gold	15,000^{‡}
United Kingdom (BPI)	Silver	200,000^{‡}
^{‡} Sales+streaming figures based on certification alone.

== Release history ==
Release dates and formats for "Cloud 9"
Region	Date	Format(s)	Version	Label	Ref.
Various	January 10, 2020	Digital download; streaming	Original	Mom + Pop	
United States	April 6, 2021	Alternative radio	Original	Mom + Pop	
Various	April 16, 2021	Digital download; streaming	Tegan and Sara Remix	Mom + Pop	
United States	April 27, 2021	Contemporary hit radio	Tegan and Sara Remix	Mom + Pop	
