= Harriet Holman =

American politician

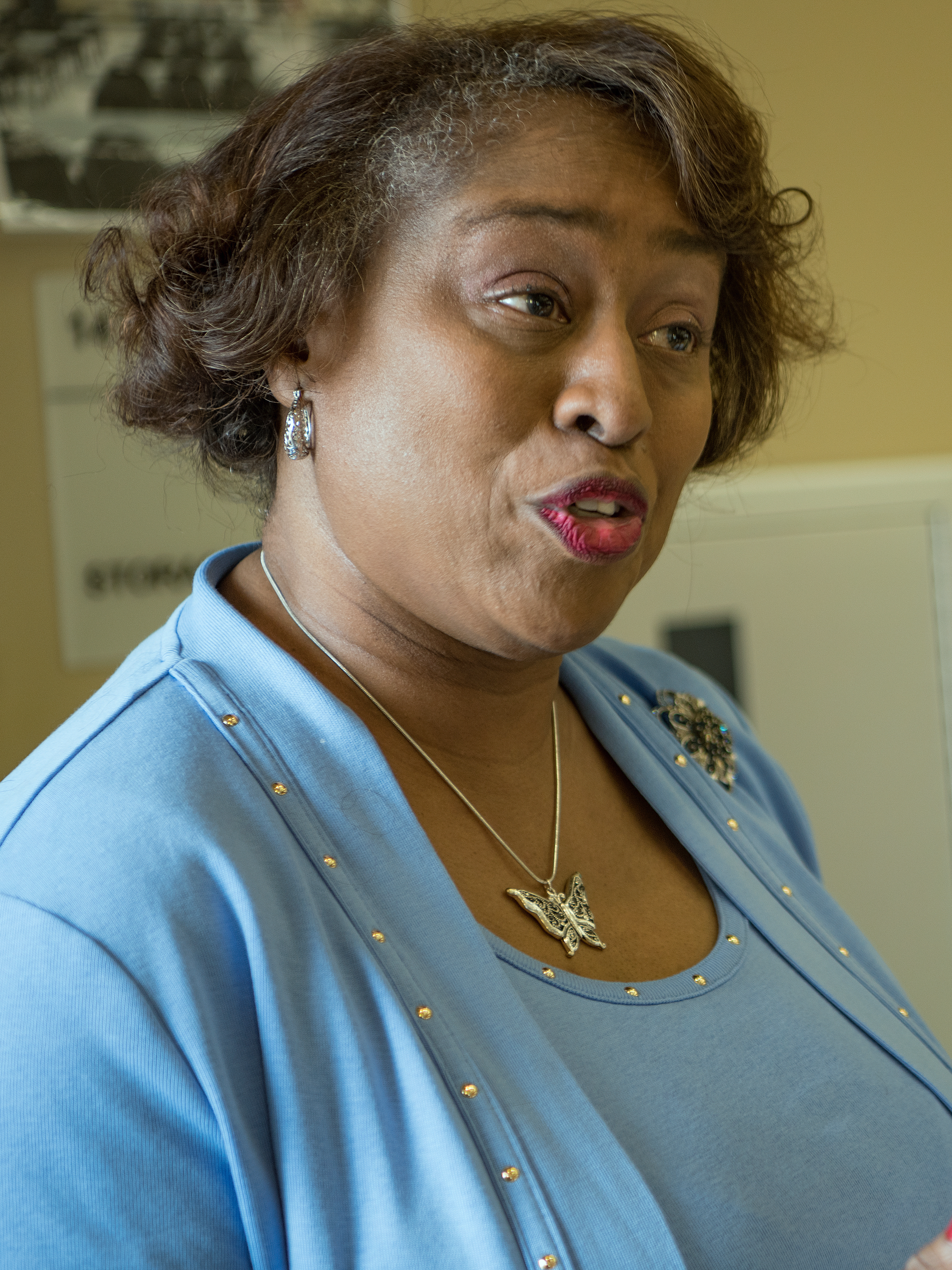
- Holman in 2019

Member of the South Carolina House of Representatives from the 102nd district
- In office November 11, 2024 – November 9, 2026
- Preceded by: Joseph H. Jefferson
- Succeeded by: Montez Aiken

Personal details
- Born: December 14 Mobile, Alabama, U.S.
- Party: Republican (since 2022)
- Other political affiliations: Democratic (until 2022)
- Spouse: Herman Holman (m. 2009)
- Education: Central Texas College (AA); Jackson State University (BA); Claflin University (MS)

Harriet A. Holman is an American politician who served as a member of the South Carolina House of Representatives representing the 102nd District from 2024 to 2026. Upon her election, she became the first Black Republican woman to serve in the South Carolina General Assembly.

== Background ==
Holman was born in Mobile, Alabama. She graduated from Central Texas College with an Associate of Arts, Jackson State University with a Bachelor of Arts, and Claflin University with a Master of Science.

Holman was attending Wiley College when she decided to join the military, following in the footsteps of her father and older brothers. She started her military career in August 1980; her first duty station was Fort Campbell, Kentucky, with the 101st Airborne Division, where she was a still photographer. She re-entered service after university and retired as a United States Army Lieutenant Colonel.

She earned a Defense Meritorious Service Medal, Meritorious Service Medal (6th award), Army Commendation Medal (3rd award), Army Achievement Medal, National Defense Service Medal (2nd) Armed Forces Expeditionary Medal, Global War on Terrorism Service Medal, Korean Defense Service Medal, Army Service Ribbon, and an Overseas Service Ribbon (2nd award).

== Political career ==
Holman served on Dorchester County Council as a Democrat before switching affiliation to the Republican Party in 2022. She was appointed to fill the vacant district one seat in 2018 by Governor Henry McMaster. Holman defeated a rival to win the Republican primary for her Council District seat.

On February 19, 2024, Holman announced her bid to challenge Democratic incumbent Joseph H. Jefferson for South Carolina House Seat District 102.

Holman defeated Jefferson to win the general election.

== Personal life ==
Holman married her husband Herman in 2009, they have three children. In 2019, Holman's son, Tonie Jackson Jr., died in a fire that destroyed the family home. She resides in Ridgeville, South Carolina and attends the Shady Grove United Methodist Church.
