= Montez Aiken =

American politician

Member-elect of the South Carolina House of Representatives from the 102nd district
- Assuming office November 9, 2026
- Succeeding: Harriet Holman

Personal details
- Party: Democratic
- Website: Campaign website

Montez Aiken is an American politician. A member of the Democratic Party, he is the member for the 102nd district of the South Carolina House of Representatives. He was elected at the 2026 election.
