= Thomas Beach (politician) =

American politician and attorney

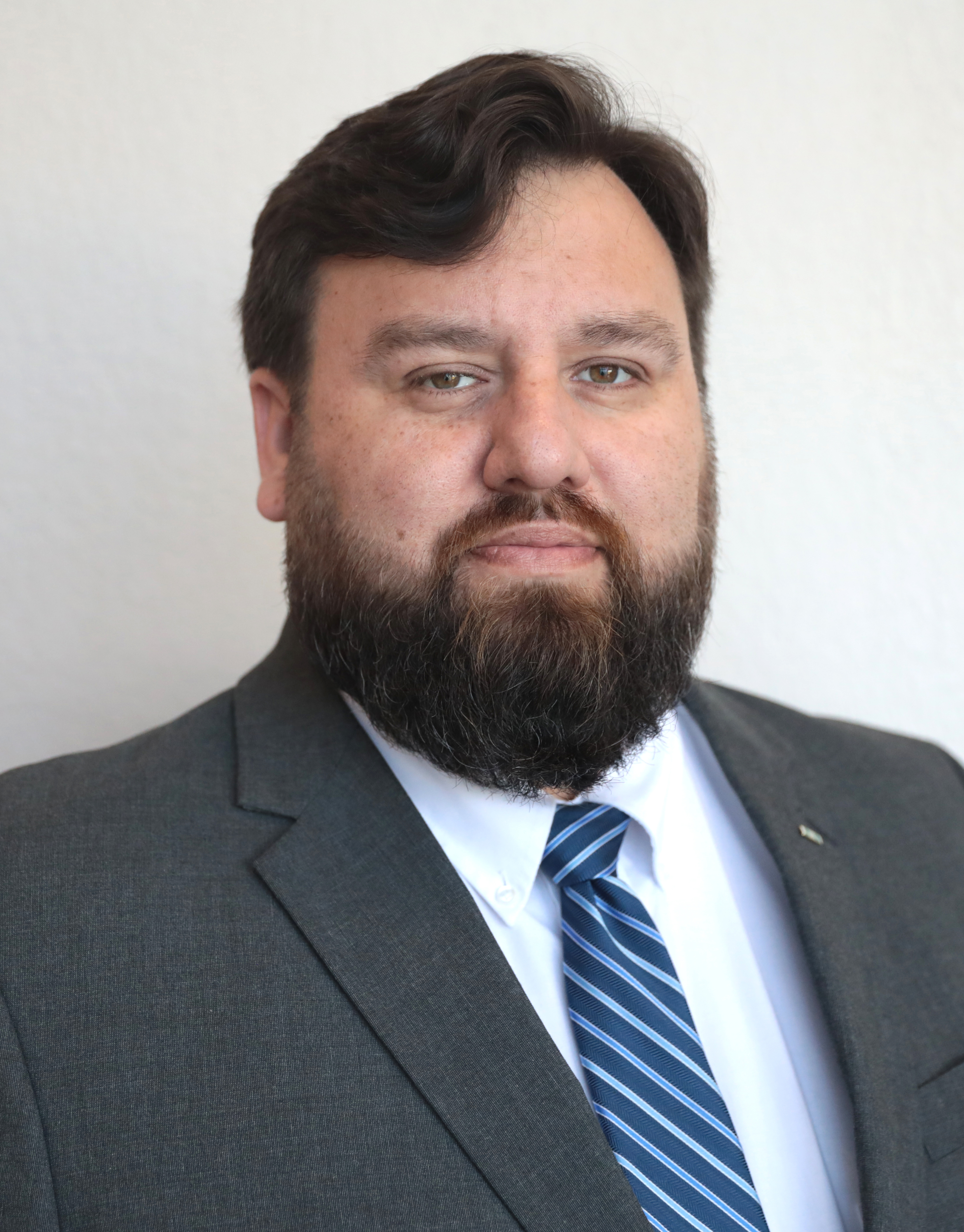

Member of the South Carolina House of Representatives from the 10th district
- Incumbent
- Assumed office November 14, 2022
- Preceded by: West Cox

Personal details
- Born: December 3, 1974 (age 51) Delta, Colorado, U.S.
- Party: Republican
- Education: University of Alabama (BA)

Military service
- Branch/service: United States Army
- Years of service: 1994–1998

Thomas Beach (born December 3, 1974) is an American real estate agent and politician who is currently serving as a member of the South Carolina House of Representatives from the 10th district. He is a member of the Republican Party.

== Early life and career ==
Born in Delta, Colorado, Beach joined the United States Army in 1994 and served until 1998. He served with the 75th Ranger Regiment, the 2nd Infantry Division, and the 25th Infantry Division. Beach is a Real estate agent in Upstate South Carolina.

== Political career ==
Beach won the June 2022 Republican primary and ran unopposed in the general election. He succeeded West Cox on December 6, 2022.

Beach serves on the House Medical, Military, Public and Municipal Affairs Committee.

He is a member of the South Carolina Freedom Caucus.
