= Kirkman Finlay III =

American politician

Kirkman Finlay

Member of the South Carolina House of Representatives from the 75th district
- In office December 4, 2012 – November 14, 2022
- Preceded by: Jim Harrison
- Succeeded by: Heather Bauer

Personal details
- Born: February 16, 1970 (age 56) Columbia, South Carolina, U.S.
- Party: Republican
- Spouse: Kathleen Ravenel
- Parent: Kirkman Finlay Jr. (father)
- Education: University of Virginia (BA)

Kirkman Finlay III (born February 16, 1970) is an American politician. He is a former member of the South Carolina House of Representatives from the 75th District, serving since 2012. He is a member of the Republican Party.

== Biography ==
Kirkman Finlay III was born and raised in Columbia, South Carolina, on land that was once part of his ancestor Wade Hampton’s antebellum plantation. He grew up in a family with deep roots in the region’s history and public life. His parents are Kirkman Finlay Jr., who was mayor of Columbia, South Carolina from 1978 to 1986, and Rab Finlay.

Finlay attended Heathwood Hall Episcopal School, where he played multiple sports and achieved the rank of Eagle Scout by the age of 13. Seeking broader academic opportunities, he transferred to Groton School, a boarding school in New England. He later earned a bachelor’s degree in ancient history with a focus on Greek and Latin from the University of Virginia in 1992. Although he was accepted into a doctoral program, he chose instead to return home to South Carolina to pursue a career closer to his family and community.

In his early twenties, Finlay took responsibility for managing his family’s real estate holdings and financial affairs following his father’s illness and passing in 1993. He also ventured into the restaurant business, operating Rising High, a bakery and café, at various locations in the Columbia area from the early 1990s until 2007. Despite setbacks, he later found success with other ventures, including Doc’s Barbecue & Southern Buffet and Pawleys Front Porch.

== Political career ==
Finlay served on Columbia City Council from 2006 to 2010.

In 2010 Finlay ran for mayor of Columbia, losing to Stephen K. Benjamin.

=== 2012 South Carolina House race ===
In 2012 Finlay ran for a South Carolina House seat vacated by Jim Harrison, defeating lawyer and Democratic candidate Joe McCulloch in a close race.

=== 2022 South Carolina House race ===
In the 2022 general election Finlay was defeated by Democrat Heather Bauer.

=== 2024 South Carolina House race ===
In March 2024, Finlay filed to challenge Bauer for South Carolina House District 75. He received the endorsement of House Speaker Murrell Smith Jr. Finlay won the June Republican Primary and was defeated by Bauer in the November general election.

== Electoral history ==
Date	Election	Candidate	Party	Votes	%
South Carolina House of Representatives, 75th district
Nov 6, 2012	General	Kirkman Finlay III	Republican	7,219	51.05
Nov 6, 2012	General	Joseph M. McCulloch Jr.	Democratic	6,911	48.87
Nov 6, 2012	General	Write Ins		12	0.08
Nov 6, 2012	General	James H. Harrison did not seek reelection; seat stayed Republican			
Nov 4, 2014	General	Kirkman Finlay III	Republican	5,833	53.52
Nov 4, 2014	General	Joseph M. McCulloch Jr.	Democratic	5,057	46.40
Nov 4, 2014	General	Write Ins		9	0.08
Nov 8, 2016	General	Kirkman Finlay III	Republican	9,072	59.41
Nov 8, 2016	General	Tyler S. Gregg	Democratic	6,175	40.44
Nov 8, 2016	General	Write Ins		22	0.14
Nov 6, 2018	General	Kirkman Finlay III	Republican	7,842	57.48
Nov 6, 2018	General	John V. Crangle	Democratic/American	5,780	42.37
Nov 6, 2018	General	Write Ins		20	0.15
Nov 3, 2020	General	Kirkman Finlay III	Republican	8,759	50.69
Nov 3, 2020	General	J. Rhodes Bailey	Democratic	8,502	49.20
Nov 3, 2020	General	Write Ins		20	0.12
Nov 8, 2022	General	Heather Bauer	Democratic	7,505	50.74
Nov 8, 2022	General	Kirkman Finlay III	Republican	7,270	49.15
Nov 8, 2022	General	Write Ins		17	0.11
