= Candy Waites =

American politician

Member of the South Carolina House of Representatives from the 75th district
- In office June 1988 – December 1994
- Preceded by: Jean Hoefer Toal
- Succeeded by: Jim Harrison

Personal details
- Born: Candy Yaghjian; 1943 (age 82–83) New York City, New York
- Party: Democratic
- Spouse: Robert Geddings Waites (m. 1965)
- Relations: Edmund Yaghjian (father)
- Children: 2
- Education: Wheaton College; University of South Carolina

Candy Yaghjian Waites (née Candy Yaghjian; born 1943) is an American former politician.

== Early life ==
Candy Yaghjian Waites was born in 1943, in New York City. Her father was Armenian-born painter Edmund Yaghjian, and her mother was American of Scottish descent. The family moved from New York City to Columbia, South Carolina, in the mid-1940s, when her father Edmund Yaghjian left the Art Students League of New York, for a teaching position at the University of South Carolina.

Candy Yaghjian attended Wheaton College. During the 1964 presidential election, the student body of Wheaton College helped Yaghjian raise money to travel home and vote in the election, as, at the time, South Carolina law only permitted military personnel to request absentee ballots.

Yaghjian married Robert Geddings Waites in 1965. The couple raised two children.

== Career ==
Waites was president of the League of Women Voters of Columbia/Richland County from 1973 to 1976. She ran for a seat on the Richland County Council for the first time in 1976. Waites remained a county council member for twelve years.

Subsequently, Waites was nominated by the Democratic Party and won a June 1988 special election against Republican candidate Ray Rossi in the South Carolina House of Representatives's 75th district. Waites faced Rossi in the November general elections and secured a full term in office. As a legislator, Waites was supportive of environmental regulations. In 1989, she filed a complaint with the state ethics board regarding a contract between the state government and architectural firm R. Phil Roof to build a new state prison. Waites opted not to run for another full term as state legislator in 1994, because her district was subject to reapportionment. After leaving public office, Waites served as lecturer of political science and an associate dean of the Leadership Institute at Columbia College from 1993 to 1999.

During her tenure at Columbia, Waites earned a master's degree in public administration at the University of South Carolina in 1997. Between 1999 and 2003, Waites was director of the division of children's services for the South Carolina Governor's Office. She then returned to Columbia College as director of the Leadership Institute, serving until 2010.
