= Leon Howard (South Carolina politician) =

American politician (born 1955)

Member of the South Carolina House of Representatives from the 76th district
- Incumbent
- Assumed office November 14, 1994
- Preceded by: Jim Harrison

Personal details
- Born: 1955 (age 70–71)
- Party: Democratic

Leon Howard (born 1955) is an American politician. He is a member of the South Carolina House of Representatives from the 76th District, serving since 1994. He is a member of the Democratic party.

Howard currently serves as Chair of the Richland County Legislative Delegation and serves on the House Ways and Means Committee.

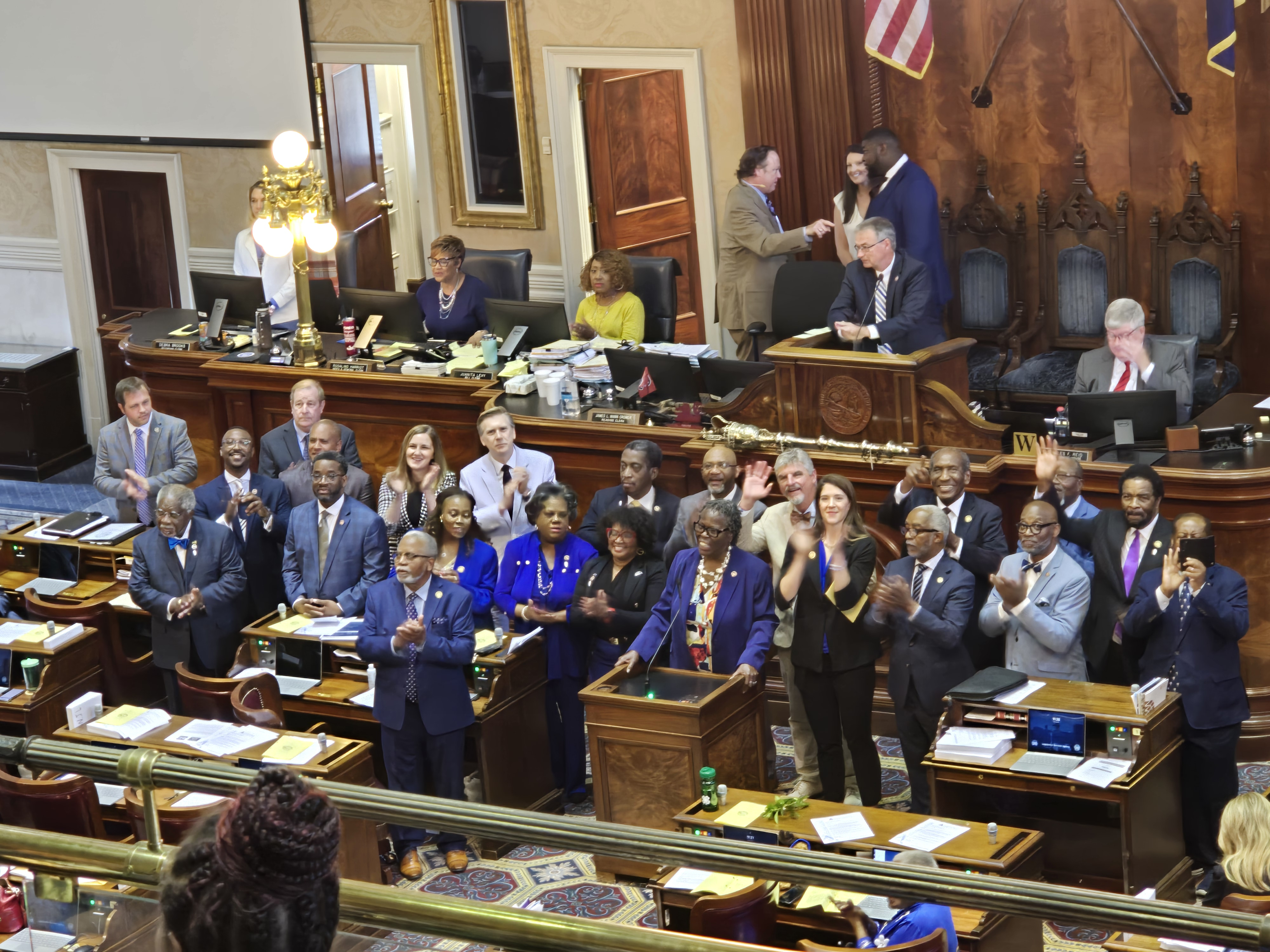
Howard (out front, 7th from left) with members of the South Carolina House of Representatives, 2025.
