= Tunnel vision (marksmanship) =

Tunnel vision is a term used when a shooter is focused on a target, and thus misses what goes on around that target. Therefore an innocent bystander may pass in front or behind of the target and be shot accidentally. This is easily understandable if the bystander is not visible in the telescopic sight (see Tunnel vision#Optical instruments), but can also happen without one. In this case, the mental concentration of the shooter is so focused on the target, that they fail to notice anything else.
