= Joseph H. Jefferson =

American politician

Member of the South Carolina House of Representatives from the 102nd district
- In office 2004-2024
- Preceded by: Amos Lee Gourdine
- Succeeded by: Harriet Holman

Personal details
- Born: May 31, 1947 (age 79) Pineville, South Carolina, U.S.
- Party: Democratic
- Spouse: Delores Jefferson
- Education: Claflin University (BS)
- Profession: Realtor

Joseph H. Jefferson (born May 31, 1947) was a member of the South Carolina House of Representatives, representing the 102nd District from 2004 to 2024. He is a member of the Democratic Party.

== Background ==
Jefferson was born on May 31, 1947, to Joseph H. and Omega T. Jefferson. He graduated from St. Stephens High School and then attended Claflin University, where he earned a B.S. in 1970. Jefferson also attended the South Carolina Criminal Justice Academy Magistrate School in 1999. On May 30, 1970, he married Deloris Livingston and the couple has 3 children, Trena Mack, Marva Patterson, and Joseph III.

== Political career ==
Jefferson was a Specialist Assistant to Congressman Mendel Jackson Davis from 1972 to 1980, Chairman of the Berkeley County School Board and represented the Sixth Congressional District as a member of the South Carolina Department of Transportation Commission from 1994 to 1998. Jefferson served as a Magistrate Judge for Berkeley County for 32 years.

Jefferson served as 2nd Vice Chair of the House Labor, Commerce and Industry Committee.
