= Bill Crosby (politician) =

American politician (born 1937)

Member of the South Carolina House of Representatives from the 117th district
- In office November 8, 2010 – November 12, 2018
- Preceded by: Tim Scott
- Succeeded by: Krystle Matthews

Personal details
- Born: November 29, 1937 (age 88) Charleston, South Carolina, U.S.
- Party: Republican

William E. Crosby (born November 29, 1937) is an American politician who was a member of the South Carolina House of Representatives from the 117th District, serving from 2010 to 2018. He is a member of the Republican party.
