= Edmund Yaghjian =

Armenian-born American visual artist (1903–1997)

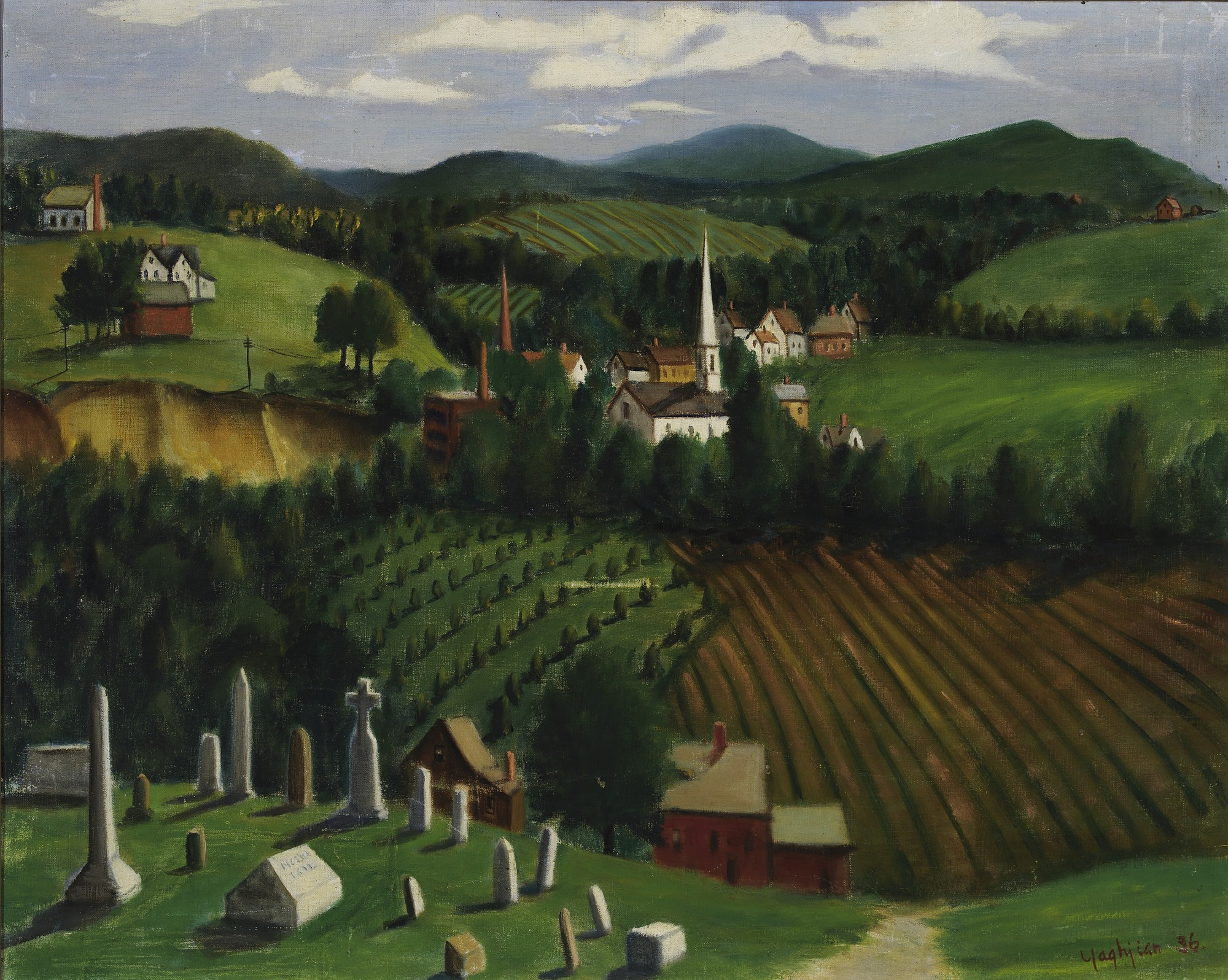
- The White Church (1936) by Edmund Yaghjian
- Born: Edmund K. Yaghjian; February 16, 1903; Harpoot, Armenia (now Elazığ, Turkey)
- Died: December 2, 1997 (aged 94); Columbia, South Carolina, U.S.
- Education: Rhode Island School of Design (BFA), Art Students League of New York
- Spouse: Dorothy Candy (m. ?–1980)
- Children: 4, including Candy Waites

Edmund Yaghjian (1903–1997) was an Armenian-born American visual artist, and educator. He is known for his life drawing, and paintings of city scenes and landscapes. Yaghjian taught at the Art Students League of New York and at the University of South Carolina.

== Early life and education ==
Edmund Yaghjian was born in February 16, 1903, in Harpoot, Armenia (now Elazığ, Turkey) to parents Sultan (née Ajootian) and Samuel Yaghjian. By 1907, his family moved to the United States during the Armenian genocide and settled in Providence, Rhode Island where they had a small grocery store. He became interested in making art in childhood. Yaghjian naturalized as a U.S. citizen in 1924.

He received a BFA degree in 1930, from Rhode Island School of Design in Providence; and afterwards he took courses at the Art Students League of New York in New York City, and studied under John Sloan and Stuart Davis.

He married Dorothy Candy, and they had four children.

== Career ==
From 1938 to 1942, Yaghjian taught drawing at the Art Students League of New York. In 1945, Yaghjian became the first chair of the art department at the University of South Carolina (USC) in Columbia, South Carolina, and he remained in the role until 1966. From 1966 until 1972, he was an artist-in-residence at USC. During the Vietnam War, Yaghjian was one of three professors at USC that signed a petition calling for international peacekeeping and neutrality. Among his students were painter Jasper Johns, and muralist Blue Sky.

Yaghjian's artwork was in three phases, starting with realism, which moved to stylized abstraction, and finally to abstract work. In 2007, a retrospect of his artwork was held at the South Carolina State Museum.

He died at age 94 on December 2, 1997, in Columbia, South Carolina.

His art is in museum collections, including at the Metropolitan Museum of Art in New York City, and the Smithsonian American Art Museum in Washington, D.C..
