= Ben Connell =

American politician

Member of the South Carolina House of Representatives from the 52nd district
- In office December 6, 2022 – September 13, 2024
- Preceded by: Vic Dabney
- Succeeded by: Vacant

Personal details
- Born: 1982 (age 43–44)
- Party: Republican
- Spouse: Kristin Connell
- Education: University of North Carolina Chapel Hill

J. Benjamin 'Ben' Connell (born February 20, 1982) is an American politician of the Republican Party. He is a former member of the South Carolina House of Representatives representing District 52. In the 2022 primary election for South Carolina House of Representatives District 52, Connell defeated Republican incumbent Vic Dabney, who had been a member of the South Carolina House since 2020. Connell went on to defeat Democratic nominee Eve Carlin in the general election.

Prior to this election, Connell served on Kershaw County Council.

Connell served on the House Judiciary Committee.

Connell was born in Camden, South Carolina and resides in Lugoff, South Carolina.

Connell resigned from the South Carolina House in September 2024 in conjunction with a new appointment to the Kershaw County Council.
