= West Cox =

American politician

Member of the South Carolina House of Representatives from the 10th district
- In office November 12, 2018 – December 6, 2022
- Preceded by: Joshua A. Putnam
- Succeeded by: Thomas Beach

Personal details
- Born: Westley Paul Cox; December 15, 1986 (age 39) West Pelzer, South Carolina
- Party: Republican
- Education: Clemson University (B.A.); University of South Carolina (J.D.)
- Profession: Attorney

Westley Paul Cox (born December 15, 1986) is an American politician. He is a former member of the South Carolina House of Representatives from the 10th District, who served from 2018 to 2022. He is a member of the Republican Party.

== Political career ==
Cox is a member of the Medical, Military, Public and Municipal Affairs Committee and the Operations and Management Committee.

== Electoral history ==
=== 2018 SC House of Representatives ===
Cox was the only Republican to run in 2018, so there was no Republican primary.

South Carolina House of Representatives District 10 General Election, 2018
Party	Candidate	Votes	%
Republican	West Cox	10,471	76.6
Democratic	Lucy Hoffman	3,190	23.3
Write-in		3	0.1
Total votes		13,664	100.0
Republican hold			

== Personal life ==
Cox was born in West Pelzer and currently resides in Piedmont. He graduated from Clemson University in 2008 with a Bachelor of Arts degree and received his J.D. from the University of South Carolina in 2014. He was admitted to the South Carolina Bar in November 2014. He is married to Caroline Alex, with whom he has one child. Cox is an attorney.
