= Prom Queen (Beach Bunny song) =

Single by Beach Bunny

from the EP Prom Queen
- Released: August 10, 2018
- Studio: Lubeck Studios (Mount Prospect, Illinois)
- Genre: Indie pop; pop punk
- Length: 2:17
- Label: Self-released
- Songwriter: Lili Trifilio

Beach Bunny singles chronology
"Sports" (2018)	"Prom Queen" (2018)	"Painkiller" (2018)

"Prom Queen" is a song recorded by American rock band Beach Bunny. The song was released on August 10, 2018. The song went viral on TikTok in November 2019 and also in January 2026 along with other indie pop songs such as Ant Saunders' 2019 single "Yellow Hearts."

== Background ==
Trifilio wrote the track for a friend that was struggling with body issues. The song has been called "a protest of Euro-centric beauty standards." Trifilio was nervous to release the song, with it lacking a romantic theme that was commonplace for many of her songs: "I was scared it would be listened to in the wrong way, like I was encouraging eating disorders. In general, I think there’s a void (in pop music) in discussing social issues, and I hope to write more songs like that." The song is the namesake of the band's fourth extended play, first issued in August 2018.

"Prom Queen" is one of many songs that went viral on the Chinese video-sharing service TikTok, with hundreds of thousands of user-generated videos featuring the song as its soundtrack. Abby Jones at Pitchfork described many of these clips as featuring "a girl posing in front of a phone camera to illustrate Trifilio's opening lines: 'Shut up, count your calories/I never looked good in mom jeans.'" The song first went viral in April 2019, months after its release.

== Reception ==
Greg Kot from the Chicago Tribune said the track "distills tween anxiety and self-doubt with a rare directness. It’s a survivor’s manual dressed up in dark wit and a sharp, guitar-driven melody." Jones from Pitchfork called it indicative of the band's formula: "sentimental and wistful, with a plainspokenness that prompts immediate sympathy." Paper's Eli Enis said the song "radiates a sense of emotional victory, as if Trifilio has expelled the unpleasant subject matter and is now singing from a place of resilience."

== Personnel ==
Credits adapted from the group's Bandcamp.

Beach Bunny

- Lili Trifilio - vocals, guitar, songwriting
- Jonathan Alvarado - drums
- Matt Henkels - lead guitar
- Aidan Cada – bass guitar

Production

- Ray Riot – recording engineer
- Nick Reuille – assistant recording engineer
- Aaron Cada – mixing, mastering

== Charts ==
Chart performance for "Prom Queen"
Chart (2019)	Peak position
US Hot Rock & Alternative Songs (Billboard)	26

== Certifications ==
Certifications and sales for "Prom Queen"
Region	Certification	Certified units/sales
New Zealand (RMNZ)	Gold	15,000^{‡}
United Kingdom (BPI)	Silver	200,000^{‡}
^{‡} Sales+streaming figures based on certification alone.
