= Tunnel Vision (Beach Bunny album) =

Studio album by Beach Bunny
- Released: April 25, 2025
- Genres: Indie pop, indie rock
- Length: 29:49
- Label: AWAL
- Producer: Sean O'Keefe

Beach Bunny chronology
Emotional Creature (2022)	Tunnel Vision (2025)

Professional ratings
Review scores
Source	Rating
AllMusic	3.5/5 stars
Spectrum Culture	3.5/5 stars

Tunnel Vision is the third full-length album from American indie pop band Beach Bunny. The album was released on April 25, 2025, through AWAL.

== Track listing ==
All tracks are written by Lili Trifilio, Jon Alvarado, Anthony Vaccaro.

Tunnel Vision track listing
No.	Title	Length
1.	"Mr. Predictable"	2:39
2.	"Big Pink Bubble"	1:57
3.	"Chasm"	2:49
4.	"Tunnel Vision"	2:43
5.	"Clueless"	3:28
6.	"Pixie Cut"	3:01
7.	"Vertigo"	2:28
8.	"Violence"	2:50
9.	"Just Around The Corner"	3:13
10.	"Cycles"	4:37

== Charts ==
Chart performance for Tunnel Vision
Chart (2025)	Peak position
UK Album Downloads (Official Charts)	96
UK Record Store Albums (Official Charts)	32
US Indie Store Album Sales (Billboard)	20
US Top Current Album Sales (Billboard)	41
