= Heather Bauer =

Member, South Carolina House of Representatives

Member of the South Carolina House of Representatives from the 75th district
- Incumbent
- Assumed office November 14, 2022
- Preceded by: Kirkman Finlay III

Personal details
- Party: Democratic
- Education: Indiana University of Pennsylvania; University of South Carolina

Heather Bauer is an American politician of the Democratic Party. She is the member of the South Carolina House of Representatives representing District 75.

== Political career ==
Bauer had previously run for a Columbia City Council At-Large seat.

=== 2022 South Carolina House race ===
In the 2022 general election for South Carolina House of Representatives District 75, Bauer defeated Republican Kirkman Finlay III, who had been a member of the South Carolina House since 2012. Bauer was outraised by Finlay, but prevailed due to public concern about women's reproductive rights.

Statements were issued by both the South Carolina Democratic Party and the South Carolina Republican Party.

Bauer is a member of the House Agriculture, Natural Resources and Environmental Affairs Committee.

=== 2024 South Carolina House race ===
In June 2024, former South Carolina House District 75 incumbent Kirkman Finlay defeated Tracy Robins in the Republican primary, and challenged Bauer. Finlay received the endorsement of House Speaker Murrell Smith Jr. Bauer defeated Finlay in the general election.

Bauer attended the 2024 Democratic National Convention as 2nd Congressional District delegate.

=== 2026 South Carolina House race ===
See also: 2026 South Carolina House of Representatives election

Bauer defeated Republican Tracy Robins and Libertarian Joshua Parks in the general election.

== Recognition ==
Bauer ranked number 14 on the Post and Courier Columbia's 2025 Power List.

== Personal life ==
Bauer and husband Michael Tyus were married on June 7, 2025.
