= Jordan Pace =

American politician

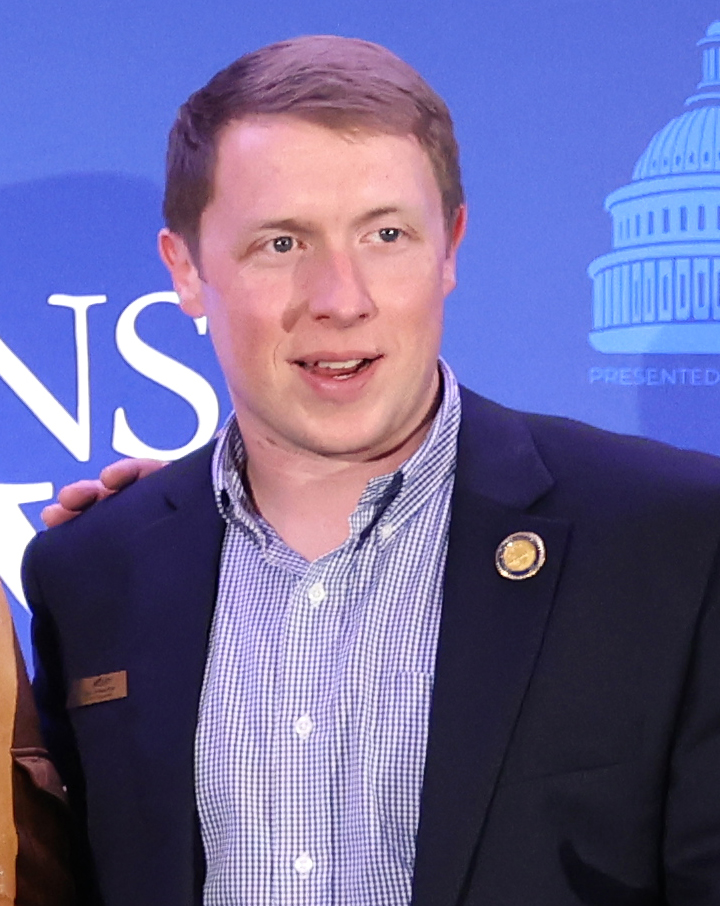
- Pace in 2024

Member of the South Carolina House of Representatives from the 117th district
- Incumbent
- Assumed office 2023
- Preceded by: Krystle Matthews

Personal details
- Born: 1989 (age 36–37) Spartanburg, South Carolina, U.S.
- Party: Republican
- Spouse: Mary Davidson
- Children: 1
- Education: Charleston Southern University

Jordan S. Pace (born 1989) is an American politician of the Republican Party. He is the member of the South Carolina House of Representatives representing District 117. He also serves as the Chairman of the South Carolina Freedom Caucus.

== Political career ==
=== 2024 South Carolina House race ===
Pace ran without a primary challenger for House seat 117. He won with no opposition in the general election.

In June 2024, Pace was elevated to chair of the South Carolina House Freedom Caucus.

=== 2022 South Carolina House race ===
In the 2022 general election for South Carolina House of Representatives District 117, Pace defeated Democratic incumbent Krystle Matthews, who had been a member of the South Carolina House since 2018. Matthews was running simultaneously for the US Senate seat held by Republican incumbent Tim Scott, who ultimately defeated her in that race.

Pace serves on the Medical, Military, Public and Municipal Affairs Committee.

Statements were issued by Henry McMaster, Governor of South Carolina who won his re-election bid, and Drew McKissick, chair of the South Carolina Republican Party.

In 2023, Pace was one of 21 Republican co-sponsors of the South Carolina Prenatal Equal Protection Act of 2023. After several Republicans withdrew their support for the bill, Pace said the media had "overblown the death penalty aspect", called the chances of a woman being given the death penalty "infinitesimally small", and said the opposition was "an absurd fallacy".
