= Kimberly Johnson (politician) =

American politician

Member of the South Carolina House of Representatives from the 64th district
- In office November 9, 2020 – November 14, 2022
- Preceded by: Robert L. Ridgeway III
- Succeeded by: Fawn Pedalino

Personal details
- Born: Manning, South Carolina, U.S.
- Party: Democratic
- Education: University of South Carolina (BA, MSW)

Kimberly O. Johnson is an American politician. She is a former member of the South Carolina House of Representatives from the 64th District, serving since 2020. She is a member of the Democratic party. She was defeated by Republican challenger Fawn Pedalino in the 2022 general election.
