= Vic Dabney =

American politician

Member of the South Carolina House of Representatives from the 52nd district
- In office November 9, 2020 – November 14, 2022
- Preceded by: Laurie Funderburk
- Succeeded by: Ben Connell

Personal details
- Born: February 11, 1958 (age 68) Sumter, South Carolina
- Party: Republican
- Spouse: Patsy Catoe (m. 1977)
- Children: 4

Victor M. Dabney is an American politician. He is a former member of the South Carolina House of Representatives from the 52nd District, serving since 2020. He is a member of the Republican party.
