= Tunnelvision =

Mural by Blue Sky in Columbia, South Carolina

Coordinates: 34.006753°N 81.03203°W

Tunnelvision is a 50 ft × 75 ft large trompe-l'œil painting, by Blue Sky, on a building in Columbia, South Carolina, USA, which shows a tunnel in original size. Tunnelvision looks very naturalistic.
