= Fawn Pedalino =

American politician

Member of the South Carolina House of Representatives from the 64th district
- Incumbent
- Assumed office December 2022
- Preceded by: Kimberly Johnson
- Succeeded by: Michele Demery

Personal details
- Born: May 12, 1987 (age 39) Charleston, South Carolina, U.S.
- Citizenship: American; Natchez-Kusso
- Party: Republican
- Spouse: Joseph Jason Pedalino

Fawn Pedalino is an American politician of the Republican Party. She is the member of the South Carolina House of Representatives representing District 64.

== Early life ==
Pedalino is a member of the Edisto Natchez-Kusso Tribe of South Carolina, one of South Carolina's recognized Native American entities.

== Political career ==
=== 2022 South Carolina House of Representatives election ===
In the 2022 general election for South Carolina House of Representatives District 64, Pedalino defeated Democratic incumbent Kimberly O. Johnson, who had been a member of the South Carolina House since 2020.

Pedalino previously served on the House Interstate Cooperation Committee and the Medical, Military, Public and Municipal Affairs Committee. She currently serves on the Labor, Commerce and Industry (Labor, Commerce & Manufacturing, Banking & Insurance, Merchants & Mercantile Affairs) and the Rules Committees.

In 2023, Pedalino was briefly among the Republican co-sponsors of the South Carolina Prenatal Equal Protection Act of 2023, which would make women who had abortions eligible for the death penalty; she later withdrew her sponsorship.

=== 2024 South Carolina House of Representatives election ===
In the 2024 general election, Pedalino defeated Democratic challenger Quadri Bell with a 55% margin.

=== 2026 South Carolina House of Representatives election ===
In the 2026 general election, Pedalino was defeated by Democratic challenger Michele Demery.

== See also ==
- List of Native American politicians
- Native American women in politics
