= Beach Bunny (band) =

American rock band

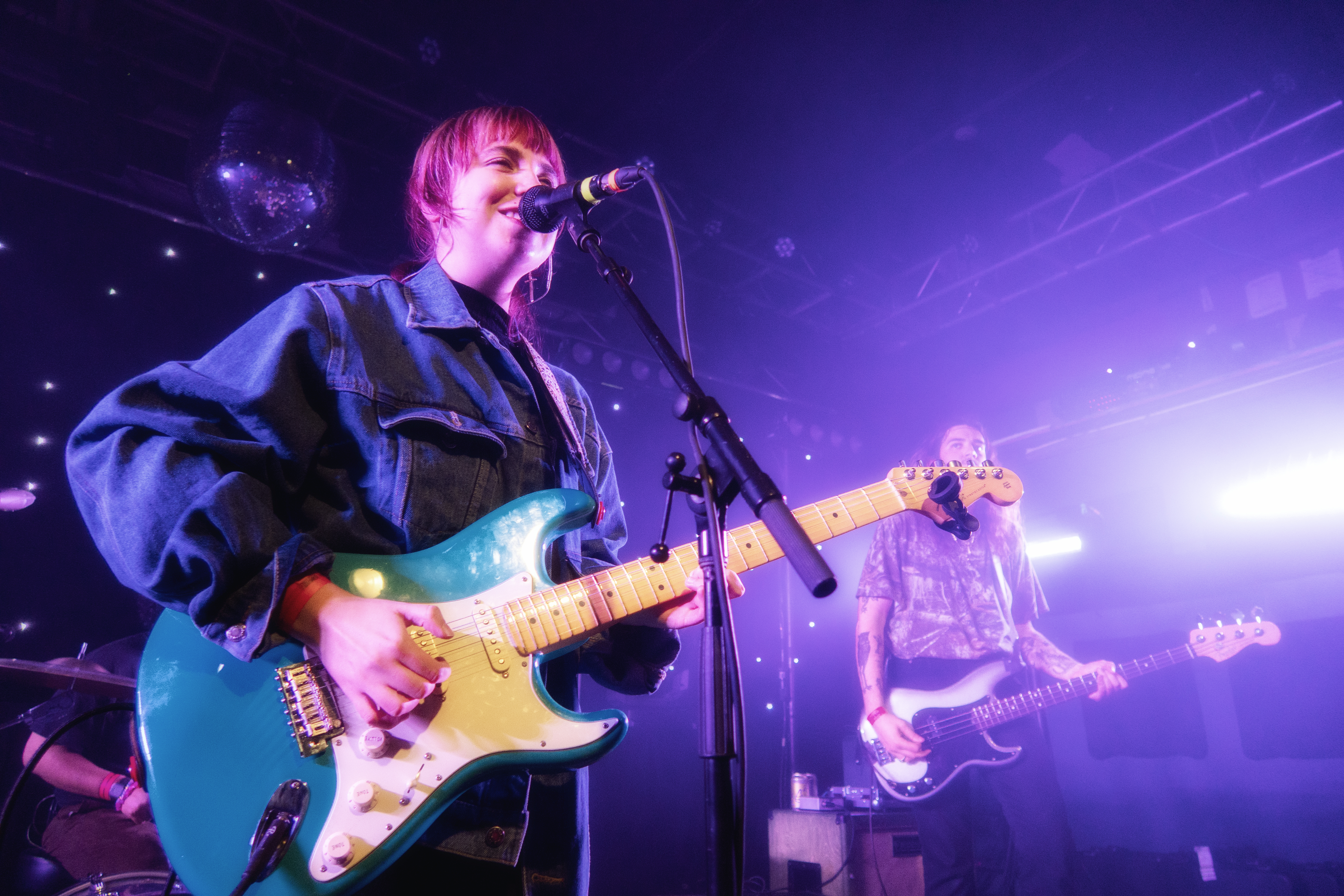
- Lili Trifilio performing in 2021

Background information
- Origin: Chicago, Illinois, U.S.
- Genres: Indie pop; indie rock; power pop; bedroom pop
- Years active: 2015–present
- Labels: Mom + Pop; AWAL; Warner Music
- Members: Lili Trifilio; Jon Alvarado; Anthony Vaccaro
- Past members: Aidan Cada; Matt Henkels
- Website: www.beachbunnymusic.com

Beach Bunny is an American rock band formed in 2015 in Chicago, Illinois. Initially a solo project by guitarist and vocalist Lili Trifilio, Beach Bunny became a full band in 2017. The group achieved widespread popularity after their 2018 song "Prom Queen" went viral on TikTok in late 2019. Their 2020 song "Cloud 9" also went viral on TikTok in 2021.

== History ==
Beach Bunny began as a bedroom-based solo project in 2015 when Lili Trifilio recorded a song titled "6 Weeks". The same year, Trifilio released her first EP, Animalism. She released her second EP, Pool Party, in 2016. In 2017, she released her third EP Crybaby, and Beach Bunny expanded to a full four-piece lineup shortly after. In 2018, Beach Bunny released their fourth EP, Prom Queen.

On October 31, 2019, Trifilio and the band announced that they had signed to Mom + Pop Music and released their first full-length album, Honeymoon, on February 14, 2020. The album was produced by Joe Reinhart at Electrical Audio; the Chicago studio owned by Steve Albini, and subsequently mixed at Reinhart's Headroom Studios. Honeymoon was met with widespread critical acclaim, appearing on the Best Albums of 2020 lists in both The New York Times, and Rolling Stone. The album contained the song "Cloud 9", which became the band's second song to go viral on TikTok, where it was used in 2 million videos.

In November 2020, the band released a new single titled "Good Girls (Don't Get Used)". Their fifth EP, Blame Game, was released in 2021.

In October 2021, the band released the single "Oxygen". This was followed by the single "Fire Escape" in March 2022, along with the announcement of their sophomore album Emotional Creature, released on July 22, 2022.

In June 2024, the band released the single "Vertigo", their first release of new music in nearly two years and as a three-piece, following the 2022 departure of lead guitarist Matt Henkels. Their third studio album Tunnel Vision was released on April 25, 2025.

== Band members ==
Current

- Lili Trifilio – vocals, rhythm guitar, songwriter and lyricist (2015–present)
- Jon Alvarado – drums, percussion (2017–present)
- Anthony Vaccaro – bass guitar (2019–2022); lead guitar (2022–present)

Former

- Aidan Cada – bass (2017–2019)
- Matt Henkels – lead guitar (2017–2022)

Touring

- Tay Norwood – bass guitar (2022–2025)
- Claire Zhang - electric guitar (2024–present)
- Nic Cheatle - bass guitar (2025–present)

== Discography ==
Beach Bunny discography
- Studio albums: 3
- EPs: 6
- Compilation albums: 1
- Singles: 14

=== Studio albums ===
Title	Album details	Peak chart positions						
Title	Album details	US Sales	US Alt	US Heat	US Indie	US Rock	UK Indie Break.	UK Record Store
Honeymoon	Released: February 14, 2020; Label: Mom + Pop; Format: LP, CD, cassette, digital download, streaming	25	21	2	27	38	―	―
Emotional Creature	Released: July 22, 2022; Label: Mom + Pop; Format: LP, CD, cassette, digital download, streaming	19	―	1	44	―	19	38
Tunnel Vision	Released: April 25, 2025; Label: AWAL; Format: LP, CD, cassette, digital download, streaming	― (Note: Tunnel Vision did not enter the Top Album Sales chart, but peaked at 41 on the Top Current Albums Sales chart.)	―	―	―	―	―	32

=== Compilation albums ===
Title	Album details
Prom Queen / Crybaby	Released: September 20, 2019; Label: Triple Crown; Format: LP

=== Extended plays ===
Title	EP details	Peak chart positions		
Title	EP details	US Sales	US Heat	UK Phys.
Animalism	Released: December 16, 2015; Label: Self-released; Format: Digital download, streaming	―	―	―
Pool Party	Released: August 23, 2016; Label: Self-released; Format: Digital download, streaming	―	―	―
Crybaby	Released: June 1, 2017; Label: Self-released; Format: Digital download, streaming	―	―	―
Prom Queen	Released: August 10, 2018; Label: Mom + Pop; Format: LP, cassette, digital download, streaming	―	―	―
Beach Bunny on Audiotree Live	Released: December 16, 2018; Label: Audiotree Music; Format: Digital download, streaming	―	―	―
Blame Game	Released: January 15, 2021; Label: Mom + Pop; Format: LP, CD, cassette, digital download, streaming	63	9	9

=== Singles ===
Title	Year	Peak chart positions								Certifications	Album
Title	Year	US Bub.	US Alt.	US Rock	CAN	IRE	UK	UK Indie	WW	Certifications	Album
"Sports" (Note: "Sports" was included in the 2019 re-issue EP Prom Queen/Sports.)	2018	―	―	―	―	―	―	―	―		Non-album single
"Prom Queen"	2018	―	―	26	―	―	―	―	―	BPI: Gold	Prom Queen
"Painkiller"	2018	―	―	―	―	―	―	―	―		Prom Queen
"Dream Boy"	2019	―	―	―	―	―	―	―	―		Honeymoon
"Ms. California"	2019	―	―	―	―	―	―	―			Honeymoon
"Cloud 9" (solo or featuring Tegan and Sara)	2020	9	11	12	92	58	64	8	193	ARIA: Gold; BPI: Silver	Honeymoon
"Promises"	2020	―	―	―	―	―	―	―	―		Honeymoon
"Good Girls (Don't Get Used)"	2020	―	―	―	―	―	―	―	―		Blame Game
"Oxygen"	2021	―	— (Note: "Oxygen" did not enter the Hot Alternative Songs chart, but peaked at number 31 on the Alternative Airplay chart.)	— (Note: "Oxygen" did not enter the Hot Rock & Alternative Songs chart, but peaked at number 41 on the Rock & Alternative Airplay chart.)	―	―	―	―	―		Emotional Creature
"Christmas Caller"	2021	―	―	―	―	―	―	―	―		Non-album single
"Fire Escape"	2022	―	―	―	―	―	―	―	―		Emotional Creature
"Karaoke"	2022	―	―	―	―	―	―	―	―		Emotional Creature
"Entropy"	2022	―	―	―	―	―	―	―	―		Emotional Creature
"Weeds"	2022	―	―	―	―	―	―	―	―		Emotional Creature
"Vertigo"	2024	―	―	―	―	―	―	―	―		Tunnel Vision
"Clueless" (solo or featuring Aly & AJ)	2024	―	―	―	―	―	―	―	―		Tunnel Vision
"Tunnel Vision"	2025	―	―	―	―	―	―	―	―		Tunnel Vision
"Big Pink Bubble"	2025	―	―	―	―	―	―	―	―		Tunnel Vision
"Year of the Optimist"	2025	―	―	―	―	―	―	―	―		Non-album singles
"July"	2026	―	―	―	―	―	―	―	―		Non-album singles
"Vinegar"	2026	―	―	―	―	―	―	―	―		Non-album singles
