= 2026 South Carolina Attorney General election =

- November 3, 2026
- Reporting: 100% as of 1:00 p.m. EST
Nominee	David Stumbo	Richard Hricik
Party	Republican	Democratic
Popular vote	1,058,525	963,645
Percentage	52.3%	47.6%
- County results Stumbo: 50–60% 60–70% 70–80% Hricik: 50–60% 60–70% 70–80%
Attorney General before election
Alan Wilson
Republican
Elected Attorney General
David Stumbo
Republican

The 2026 South Carolina Attorney General election took place on November 3, 2026, to elect the Attorney General of South Carolina. Four-term incumbent attorney general Alan Wilson declined to seek re-election, running instead for governor. Republican David Stumbo defeated Democrat Richard Hricik in the general election.

== Republican primary ==
=== Candidates ===
==== Nominee ====
- David Stumbo, Solicitor for the Eighth Judicial Circuit of South Carolina

==== Eliminated in runoff ====
- Stephen Goldfinch, state senator from the 34th district (2016–present)

==== Eliminated in primary ====
- David Pascoe, Solicitor for the First Judicial Circuit of South Carolina (2005–present)

==== Declined ====
- Henry McMaster Jr., attorney and son of Governor Henry McMaster
- Alan Wilson, incumbent attorney general (2011–present) (running for governor)

=== Endorsements ===
Declined to endorse

Executive branch officials

- Donald Trump, president of the United States (2017–2021, 2025–present) (endorsed against Pascoe)

=== Polling ===
Poll source	Date(s) administered	Sample size (Note: Key: A – all adults RV – registered voters LV – likely voters V – unclear)	Margin of error	Stephen Goldfinch	David Pascoe	David Stumbo	Undecided
Trafalgar Group (R)	June 5–7, 2026	1,200 (LV)	± 2.9%	29%	15%	24%	32%
InsiderAdvantage (R)	June 5–6, 2026	800 (LV)	± 3.5%	20%	17%	18%	45%

=== Results ===
Primary results by county: Goldfinch: 30–40%; 40–50%; 50–60%; 60–70%; 70–80%; Stumbo: 30–40%; 40–50%; 50–60%; 60–70%; 70–80%; 80–90%; Pascoe: 30–40%; 40–50%; 50–60%

Republican primary results
Party	Candidate	Votes	%
Republican	Stephen Goldfinch	176,045	40.0
Republican	David Stumbo	157,002	35.7
Republican	David Pascoe	107,185	24.3
Total votes		440,232	100.0

=== Runoff ===
==== Debate ====
Republican primary runoff debate
No.	Date	Host	Moderator	Link	Republican	Republican
Key: P Participant A Absent N Not invited I Invited W Withdrawn						
Key: P Participant A Absent N Not invited I Invited W Withdrawn					Stephen Goldfinch	David Stumbo
1	Jun. 18, 2026			YouTube	P	P

==== Results ====
Runoff results by county: Stumbo: 50–60%; 60–70%; 70–80%; 80–90%; Goldfinch: 50–60%; 60–70%; 70–80%

Republican primary runoff results
Party	Candidate	Votes	%
Republican	David Stumbo	173,127	55.8
Republican	Stephen Goldfinch	137,427	44.2
Total votes		310,554	100.0

== Democratic primary ==
=== Candidates ===
==== Nominee ====
- Richard Hricik, attorney and nominee for state senator from the 43rd district in 2020

== General election ==
=== Predictions ===
Source	Ranking	As of
Sabato's Crystal Ball	Safe R	August 21, 2025

=== Polling ===
Poll source	Date(s) administered	Sample size	Margin of error	David Stumbo (R)	Richard Hricik (D)	Undecided
Trafalgar Group (R)	October 31 – November 1, 2026	1,091 (LV)	± 2.9%	52%	37%	11%
Trafalgar Group (R)	October 16–18, 2026	1,095 (LV)	± 2.9%	52%	37%	11%

=== Results ===
2026 South Carolina Attorney General election
Party	Candidate	Votes	%	±%
Republican	David Stumbo	1,058,525	52.32%	−45.00
Democratic	Richard Hricik	963,645	47.63%	New
Write-in		1,132	0.06%	−2.62
Total votes		2,023,302	100.0	
Republican hold				

== See also ==
- 2026 United States attorney general elections
- Attorney General of South Carolina
