= South Carolina Statehouse corruption investigation =

South Carolina corruption investigation

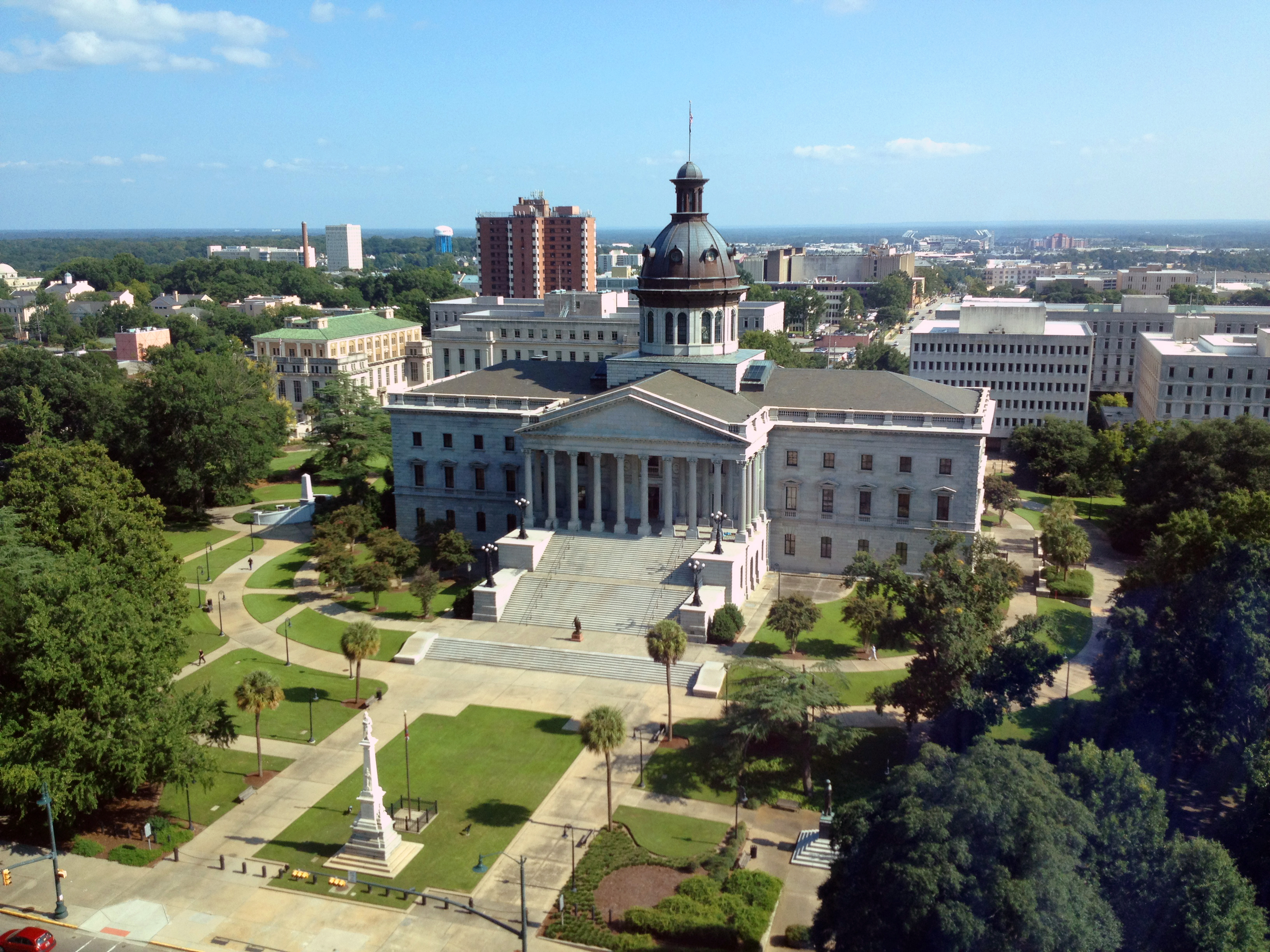
The South Carolina State House

The South Carolina Statehouse corruption investigation was a probe into unlawful interactions between members of the South Carolina General Assembly, the political firm of Richard Quinn, Sr., and major state institutions and corporations from 2013 to 2021. The influence of Quinn's consulting firm was called the Quinndom. By the end of the investigation, four members of the South Carolina General Assembly were indicted on public corruption charges. This investigation is often considered the most significant political scandal in the history of the state of South Carolina since Operation Lost Trust in 1989. Lost Trust directly influenced the passing of South Carolina's Ethics Reform Act of 1991, and led to the restructuring of the state government in 1993. The investigation raised questions about the effectiveness of that reform in the face of political corruption and dark money influence.

== Investigation timeline ==
In 2013, a report on the campaign spending of House Speaker Bobby Harrell was submitted to the Attorney General of South Carolina by the South Carolina Law Enforcement Division (SLED). Based on this report, a State Grand Jury investigation was initiated, but attorneys for Harrell called for the recusal of Attorney General Alan Wilson. Wilson designated solicitor David Pascoe to act as special prosecutor.

In 2014, Harrell was indicted, removed from office and sentenced after a guilty plea of multiple state ethics law violations. Additional legislators were named in the SLED report, and Pascoe sent a request to the Attorney General for expansion of the corruption probe to include these individuals.

In 2015, almost nine months after Pascoe’s request, the Attorney General communicated to SLED that their report should be sent to Pascoe for determination on how to prosecute.

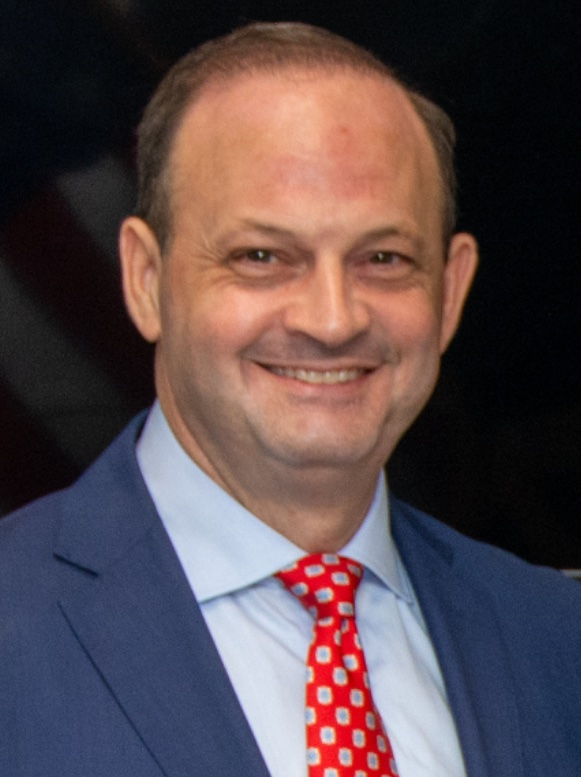
South Carolina Attorney General Alan Wilson

In 2016, a case initiation form by Pascoe and SLED Chief Mark Keel referred the case to the State Grand Jury. The Attorney General argued that only he as the elected officer could sign the form, and that Pascoe had no standing, and fired Pascoe from the case. In response, Pascoe petitioned the South Carolina Supreme Court calling for a decision on his vested authority to move forward with the investigation. On June 16, the case was heard before the Supreme Court, Pascoe arguing his own case. The Court ruled in favor of Pascoe, giving him “full authority to act as the Attorney General for purposes of the investigation.” From there, members of the State Grand Jury were selected, including the appointment of Catherine Fleming Bruce as foreman, and the investigation proceeded.

== Indictments ==
- Bobby Harrell, former Republican Speaker of the House, pled guilty to six counts, and resigned from his seat in the House.
- James H. Merrill, former Republican member of the South Carolina House of Representatives, pled guilty to misconduct.
- John Courson, former Republican member of the South Carolina Senate, resigned from his seat in the senate and pled guilty to misconduct in office.
- Jim Harrison, former Republican member of the South Carolina House of Representatives, pled guilty and received jail time.
- Tracy Edge, former Republican member of the South Carolina House of Representatives, was indicted for misconduct.
- Rick Quinn Jr., former Republican member of the South Carolina House of Representatives, pled guilty to public corruption.
- Richard Quinn, former consultant, pled guilty to lying to a grand jury and obstruction of justice.

== Aftermath ==
=== Legislative action ===
Mandy Powers Norrell and Gary Clary, former members of the South Carolina House of Representatives, introduced a campaign finance and ethics reform bill in January 2017. The bill had a hearing by the House Judiciary Committee, but was not advanced.

=== Publication of State Grand Jury Report ===
In October 2018, South Carolina Circuit Court Judge Clifton Newman ruled that the request to publish the State Grand Jury Report on the public corruption investigation should be approved. The State newspaper joined Pascoe in arguing before the court that the report should be made public.

=== Impacts on actions by the governor ===
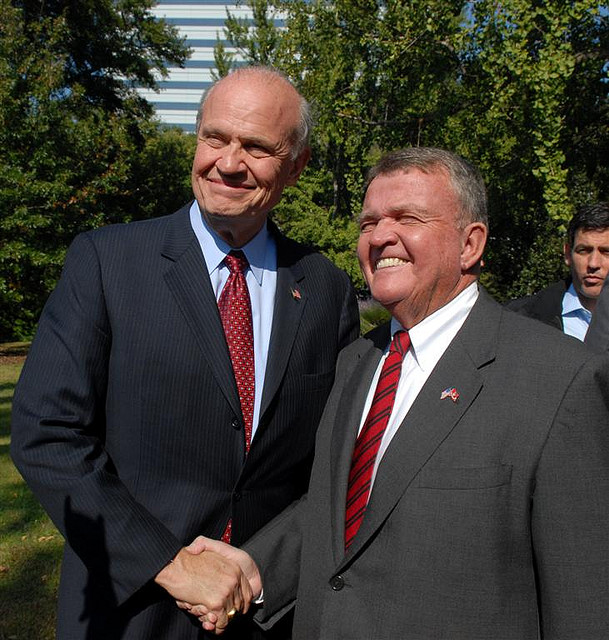
Former Senator John Courson with Fred Thompson in 2007

Governor Henry McMaster was among other public officials and corporate heads who contracted with Richard Quinn's consulting business. While he was not implicated in the corruption probe, McMaster was not immediately able to appoint replacements to retiring board members of the South Carolina Ports Authority (SCPA). The authority also contracted with Richard Quinn. After SCPA ended their contracts with Quinn, the state legislature allowed the appointments to go forward. McMaster subsequently ended his contract with Quinn.

=== Corporate accountability ===
Five corporations — the University of South Carolina, AT&T, SCANA, Palmetto Health, and the South Carolina Alliance for Justice — signed corporate integrity agreements with Pascoe to pay a fine and admit no wrongdoing in exchange for no prosecution.
