= David Stumbo =

American attorney and politician (born 1975/1976)

Attorney General of South Carolina
- Elect
- Assuming office January 2027
- Governor: Alan Wilson (elect)
- Succeeding: Alan Wilson

Personal details
- Born: April 14, 1976 (age 50)
- Party: Republican
- Spouse: Vanessa
- Children: 4
- Education: University of Toccoa Falls (BS); University of South Carolina (JD)

David M. Stumbo (born April 14, 1976) is an American attorney. Stumbo is the attorney general-elect for the State of South Carolina.

== Early life, education and career ==
Stumbo earned a Bachelor of Science degree from Toccoa Falls College and a Juris Doctor from the University of South Carolina's Joseph F. Rice School of Law.

== Political career ==
=== 2013 Solicitor election ===
Stumbo succeeded Jerry Peace as solicitor for South Carolina's Eighth Judicial Circuit on January 9, 2013.

=== 2026 Attorney General election ===
See also: 2026 South Carolina Attorney General election

Stumbo defeated David Pascoe, and State Senator Steven Goldfinch in a runoff to become the Republican nominee for attorney general of South Carolina in the 2026 election. He was hospitalized briefly before the runoff. Stumbo defeated Democratic nominee Richard Hricik in the general election.

Stumbo was endorsed in the Attorney General race by Congressman Ralph Norman.

== Electoral history ==
| Year | Office | Type | Party | Main opponent | Party | Votes for Stumbo | | | | Result | Swing | Ref. |
| Year | Office | Type | Party | Main opponent | Party | Total | % | P. | ±% | Result | Swing | Ref. |
|---|---|---|---|---|---|---|---|---|---|---|---|---|
| 2012 | Eighth Circuit Solicitor | Primary | Republican | Jerry Peace (Note: Incumbent seeking re-election.) | Republican | 9,115 | 57.98% | 1st | —N/a | Won | — | |
| 2012 | Eighth Circuit Solicitor | General | Republican | Ben Shealy | Democratic | 44,945 | 57.28% | 1st | —N/a | Won | Hold | |
| 2016 | Eighth Circuit Solicitor | General | Republican | Write-in | — | 60,449 | 99.22% | 1st | +41.94% | Won | Hold | |
| 2020 | Eighth Circuit Solicitor | General | Republican | Write-in | — | 71,930 | 98.17% | 1st | -1.05% | Won | Hold | |
| 2024 | Eighth Circuit Solicitor | General | Republican | Write-in | — | 69,558 | 99.21% | 1st | +1.04% | Won | Hold | |
| 2026 | Attorney General | Primary | Republican | Stephen Goldfinch | Republican | 157,002 | 35.66% | 2nd | —N/a | Advanced to runoff | — | |
| 2026 | Attorney General | Primary runoff | Republican | Stephen Goldfinch | Republican | 173,127 | 55.75% | 1st | —N/a | Won | — | |
| 2026 | Attorney General | General | Republican | Richard Hricik | Democratic | | | | | | | |

== Notes ==
Political offices
| Preceded by Alan Wilson | Attorney General of South Carolina; Taking office 2027 | Elect |
