= 2022 South Carolina Attorney General election =

- November 8, 2022
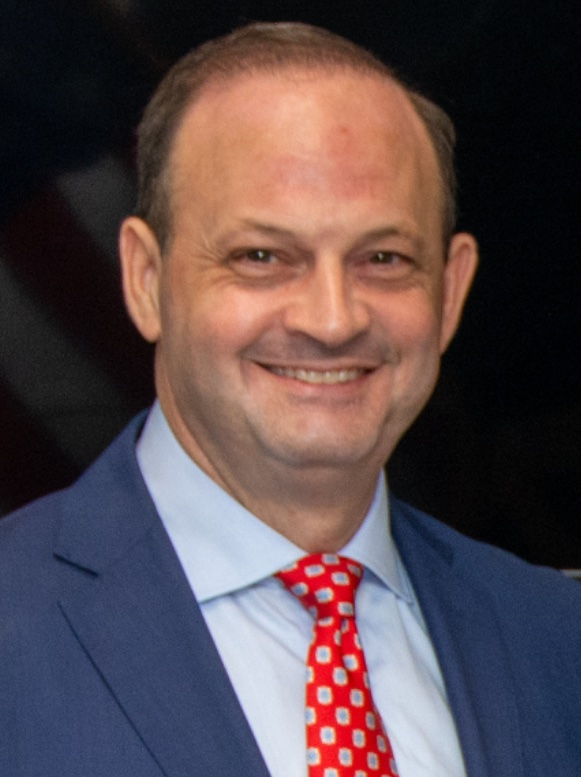
Nominee	Alan Wilson
Party	Republican
Popular vote	1,223,080
Percentage	97.32%
- Wilson: 70–80% 80–90% >90% No votes
Attorney General before election
Alan Wilson
Republican
Elected Attorney General
Alan Wilson
Republican

An election was held on November 8, 2022, to elect the attorney general of South Carolina. Republican incumbent Alan Wilson won re-election to a fourth term unopposed. The only two candidates to file for the election were Wilson and another Republican attorney, Lauren Martel.

== Republican primary ==
=== Candidates ===
==== Nominee ====
- Alan Wilson, incumbent attorney general (2011–present)

==== Eliminated in primary ====
- Lauren Martel, attorney

=== Results ===
Results by county Wilson: 50–60%; 60–70%; 70–80%; 80–90%

Republican primary results
Party	Candidate	Votes	%
Republican	Alan Wilson (incumbent)	228,538	65.71%
Republican	Lauren Martel	119,247	34.29%
Total votes		347,785	100.0%

== Democratic primary ==
=== Candidates ===
==== Declined ====
- David Pascoe, solicitor for the first judicial circuit of South Carolina

== General election ==
=== Predictions ===
Source	Ranking	As of
Sabato's Crystal Ball	Safe R	September 14, 2022
Elections Daily	Safe R	November 1, 2022

=== Results ===
2022 South Carolina Attorney General election
Party	Candidate	Votes	%	±%
Republican	Alan Wilson (incumbent)	1,223,080	97.32	+42.27
Write-ins	Write-in	33,709	2.68	+2.62
Total votes		1,256,789	100.00%	
Republican hold				

==== By county ====
County	Alan Wilson Republican		Write-ins Other parties	
County	#	%	#	%
Abbeville	6,754	99.15%	58	0.85%
Aiken	41,518	97.53%	1,051	2.47%
Allendale	749	97.78%	17	2.22%
Anderson	52,762	98.35%	886	1.65%
Bamberg	2,180	98.33%	37	1.67%
Barnwell	4,220	98.64%	58	1.36%
Beaufort	51,437	97.90%	1,103	2.10%
Berkeley	51,591	97.54%	1,302	2.46%
Calhoun	3,944	97.84%	87	2.16%
Charleston	96,064	95.51%	4,521	4.49%
Cherokee	13,651	99.09%	125	0.91%
Chester	6,852	98.63%	95	1.37%
Chesterfield	9,347	98.88%	106	1.12%
Clarendon	7,504	98.83%	89	1.17%
Colleton	8,736	98.05%	174	1.95%
Darlington	13,580	98.51%	205	1.49%
Dillon	5,054	98.31%	87	1.69%
Dorchester	35,712	97.01%	1,100	2.99%
Edgefield	6,660	98.80%	81	1.20%
Fairfield	5,002	96.84%	163	3.16%
Florence	28,486	97.68%	678	2.32%
Georgetown	19,367	98.57%	280	1.43%
Greenville	133,051	96.94%	4,204	3.06%
Greenwood	16,638	98.03%	334	1.97%
Hampton	3,319	98.81%	40	1.19%
Horry	106,375	98.75%	1,345	1.25%
Jasper	7,544	98.42%	121	1.58%
Kershaw	17,501	97.94%	358	2.06%
Lancaster	26,342	98.28%	462	1.72%
Laurens	15,818	98.16%	297	1.84%
Lee	2,612	98.57%	38	1.43%
Lexington	78,506	97.02%	2,409	2.98%
Marion	4,913	97.99%	101	2.01%
Marlboro	3,961	98.73%	51	1.27%
McCormick	3,106	98.70%	41	1.30%
Newberry	9,892	98.49%	152	1.51%
Oconee	24,523	98.40%	398	1.60%
Orangeburg	12,829	96.63%	447	3.37%
Pickens	34,338	98.14%	650	1.86%
Richland	67,824	92.52%	5,480	7.48%
Saluda	5,324	98.96%	56	1.04%
Spartanburg	75,290	97.74%	1,737	2.26%
Sumter	18,735	97.23%	1,737	2.26%
Union	6,667	98.30%	115	1.70%
Williamsburg	5,208	97.42%	138	2.58%
York	72,044	97.43%	1,899	2.57%
Totals	1,223,080	97.32%	33,709	2.68%

Counties that flipped from Democratic to Republican

- Allendale (largest municipality: Allendale)
- Fairfield (largest municipality: Winnsboro)
- Lee (largest municipality: Bishopville)
- Marion (largest municipality: Marion)
- Orangeburg (largest municipality: Orangeburg)
- Richland (largest municipality: Columbia)
- Sumter (largest municipality: Sumter)
- Williamsburg (largest municipality: Kingstree)
- Bamberg (largest municipality: Bamberg)
- Calhoun (largest municipality: St. Matthews)
- Dillon (largest municipality: Dillon)
- Charleston (largest municipality: Charleston)
- Hampton (largest municipality: Hampton)
- Jasper (largest municipality: Hardeeville)
- Clarendon (largest municipality: Manning)
- Marlboro (largest municipality: Bennettsville)

== See also ==
- South Carolina Attorney General
