= Richard Quinn (political consultant) =

American political consultant (1945 – 2024)

Richard Melvin Quinn Sr.
- Born: February 23, 1945; Charlotte, North Carolina
- Died: March 21, 2024 (aged 79); Columbia, South Carolina
- Occupation: Political consultant
- Political party: Republican Party
- Children: Richard "Rick" Quinn Jr.

Richard Quinn Sr. (February 23, 1945 — March 21, 2024) was a political consultant who, until his death, was under indictment for perjury in a state of South Carolina political corruption case. A long-time Republican Party campaign consultant, he advised the presidential campaigns of Ronald Reagan, John McCain, and Lindsey Graham. He was known as one of South Carolina's most prominent political consultants. He was once the editor of the Neo-Confederate Southern Partisan magazine although he later recanted the views he held while in that position.

Quinn was the leader of a political organization nicknamed the "Quinndom" which he started through his consulting firm, Richard Quinn & Associates. On October 18, 2017, Quinn and his son, Richard "Rick" Quinn Jr., were indicted on charges of criminal conspiracy and illegal lobbying alongside three South Carolina state lawmakers. Those charges were later dropped as part of his son's guilty plea deal. However, in July 2021, a state grand jury indictment again charged Quinn Sr. with 12 counts of perjury and two counts of obstruction of justice, to which he pleaded guilty and was sentenced to 18 months home detention.

== Early life ==
Quinn was born in Charlotte, North Carolina to George Melvin and Frances Melton Quinn. He grew up in Charleston and attended Saint Andrews High School in West Ashley, South Carolina. He married Ruth LeJeune.

== Corruption investigation ==
During the South Carolina Statehouse campaign finance investigation into then-South Carolina House Member Bobby Harrell's campaign account, solicitor David Pascoe found evidence that James Merrill and Rick Quinn Jr. had engaged in ethics violations and possible public corruption while they served their respective terms as South Carolina House of Representatives Majority Leader. Both Quinn and his father were implicated after Merrill told investigators that while Quinn Jr. was House Majority Leader, he had had Republican caucus members use his family's print shop for campaign materials which investigators believed was a possible violation of the South Carolina Campaign Reform Act.

A broader investigation into these violations began after South Carolina Attorney General Alan Wilson recused himself from the investigation due to prior contact with members of Harrell's staff. The probe ended in 2017. In 2018, the released Grand Jury Report found that "corporate entities retained Richard Quinn for the purpose of gaining access to and influence over public officials, and by failing to report Mr. Quinn's services, influenced the outcome of legislative matters with no accountability or disclosure to the public in violation of the State Lobbying Act."

Quinn initially faced trial for eleven counts of perjury and one count of obstruction of justice related to the 2013 investigation into state house corruption.

== Death ==
Richard Quinn Sr. died in March 21, 2024, at the age of 79. His obituary indicated he suffered from a rare esophageal condition he had battled intermittently for 25 years.
