= LeRoy Franklin Youmans =

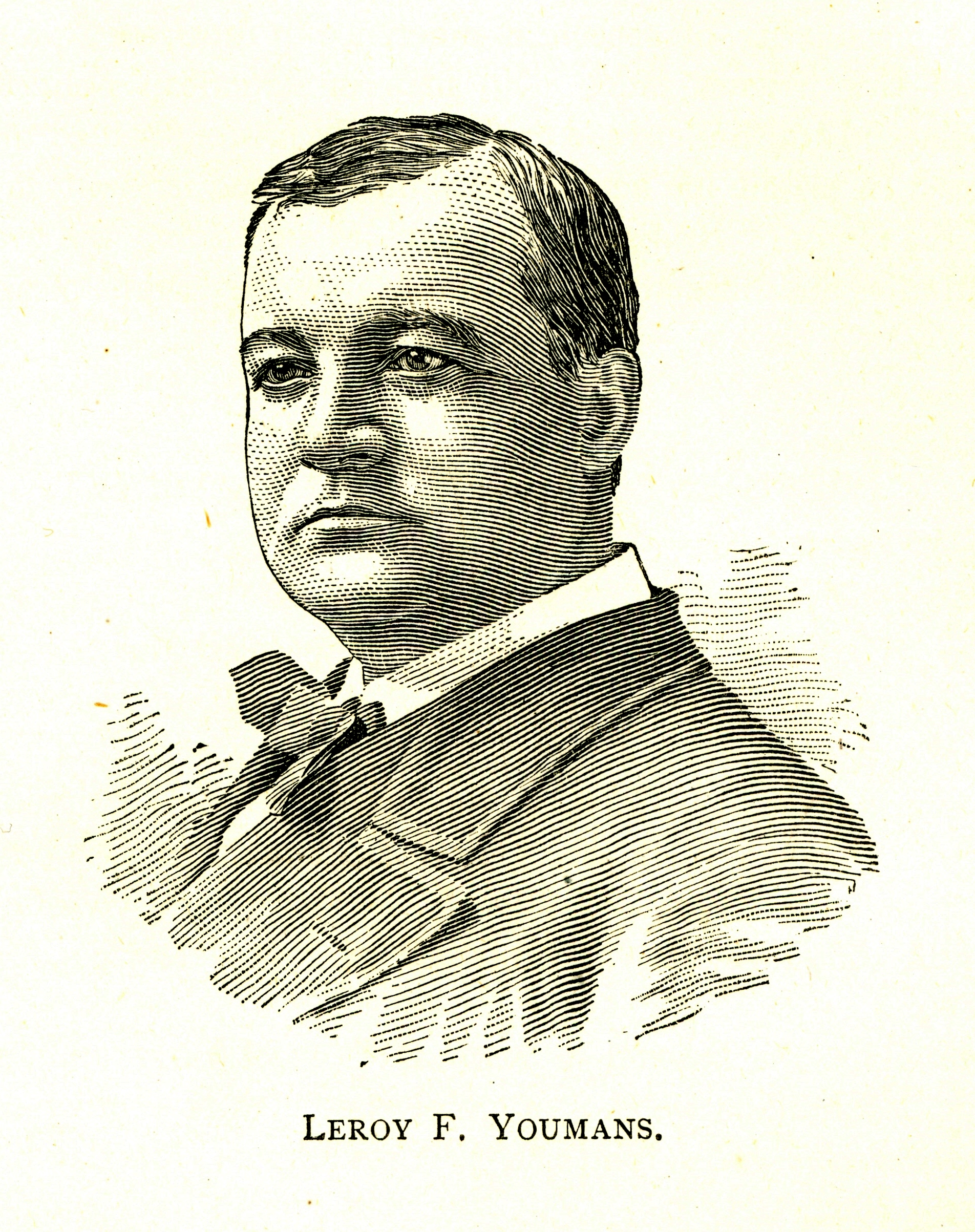

Attorney General of South Carolina
- In office 1877 - 1882
- Governor: Daniel H. Chamberlain; Wade Hampton III; William D. Simpson; Thomas B. Jeter
- Preceded by: James Conner
- Succeeded by: Charles R. Miles
- In office 1905 - 1906
- Governor: Duncan C. Heyward
- Preceded by: U. X. Gunter Jr.
- Succeeded by: D.C. Ray

Personal details
- Born: November 12, 1834 Beaufort County, South Carolina
- Died: December 10, 1906 (aged 72) Columbia, South Carolina

LeRoy Franklin Youmans (November 14, 1834 - December 10, 1906) was a lawyer, state representative, officer in a mounted riflemen unit of the Confederate Army, U.S. Attorney, South Carolina Attorney General, and state supreme court judge who lived in Charleston, South Carolina. He was born in Beaufort County, South Carolina. He graduated from South Carolina University in 1852.

Youmans was appointed U.S. Attorney by president Grover Cleveland. Youmans served as South Carolina Attorney General from 1877 to 1882 and from 1905 to 1906.

He was involved in the Red Shirt movement, a paramilitary campaign of violence to prevent African Americans from voting, bring Democrats to power, and restore white supremacy. John Calhoun Sheppard studied law under him.

He wrote about Francis Wilkinson Pickens. He also wrote a sketch of South Carolina governor Andrew Gordon Magrath. A collection of his papers survive and he had speeches published including a Columbus Day speech and an 1882 speech in the Hall of the House of Representatives to South Carolina College alumni.

He died of cirrhosis of the liver.
