= General Connor =

General Connor may refer to:

- Patrick Edward Connor (1820–1891), Union Army brigadier general and brevet major general
- Seldon Connor (1839–1917), Union Army brigadier general
- William Durward Connor (1874–1960), U.S. Army major general

== See also ==
- Fox Conner (1874–1951), U.S. Army major general
- James Conner (general) (1829–1883), Confederate States Army brigadier general
