= Hugh Leatherman =

American politician (1931–2021)

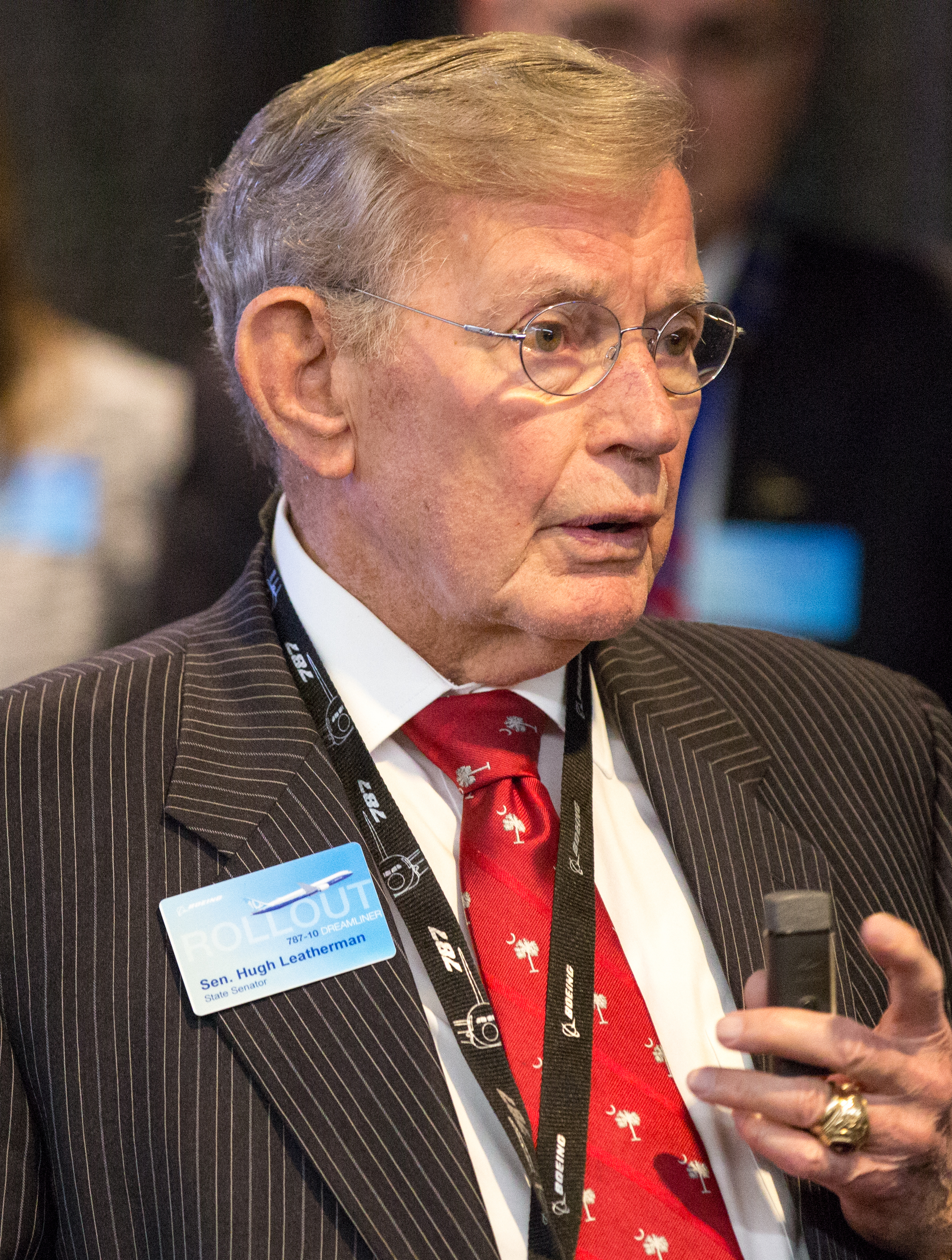

President pro tempore of the South Carolina Senate
- In office January 25, 2017 – January 8, 2019
- Preceded by: Kevin L. Bryant
- Succeeded by: Harvey S. Peeler Jr. (President)
- In office June 18, 2014 – January 23, 2017
- Preceded by: Yancey McGill
- Succeeded by: Kevin L. Bryant

Majority Leader of the South Carolina Senate
- In office January 2001 – August 1, 2005
- Preceded by: John C. Land III
- Succeeded by: Harvey S. Peeler Jr.

Member of the South Carolina Senate from the 31st district
- In office January 8, 1985 – November 12, 2021
- Preceded by: Constituency established
- Succeeded by: Mike Reichenbach

Member of the South Carolina Senate from the 11th district
- In office January 14, 1981 – January 8, 1985 Serving with Ralph Ellis, Frank McGill, Thomas Smith
- Preceded by: John Waller
- Succeeded by: William Lee

Personal details
- Born: Hugh Kenneth Leatherman Sr. April 14, 1931 Lincoln County, North Carolina, U.S.
- Died: November 12, 2021 (aged 90) Florence, South Carolina, U.S.
- Party: Democratic (before 1996); Republican (1996–2021)
- Spouses: Joyce Jerline Smith (m. 1952; div. 1977); Jean Helms Allen (m. 1978)
- Children: 6
- Education: North Carolina State University (BS)

Hugh Kenneth Leatherman Sr. (April 14, 1931 – November 12, 2021) was an American politician who served as a Republican member of the South Carolina Senate from 1981 until his death in 2021. The 31st District, which he represented, is anchored in Florence, South Carolina. From 2001 until his death, Leatherman effectively controlled South Carolina's budget as the Senate Finance Chairman and was considered one of the most powerful people in South Carolina politics. He negotiated the deal to bring Boeing to South Carolina in 2009 and secured funding for the deepening of the Charleston Harbor in 2011. At the time of his death, Leatherman served as Vice Chairman of the Senate Transportation Committee. He served as President Pro Tempore of the South Carolina Senate for all but one day from June 18, 2014, to January 8, 2019. The position was abolished and replaced with the President of the Senate. Prior to this change, Leatherman was capable of being both President of the Senate and Senate Finance Chairman. He was also a member of the State Budget and Control Board until it was abolished in 2014.

Leatherman orchestrated the Republican takeover of the South Carolina Senate in 2001. Prior to 1996, Leatherman was a member of the Democratic Party and switched parties during the Republican Revolution. Leatherman was often criticized by fellow Republicans for his willingness to work with Democratic lawmakers.

== Personal life ==
Hugh Kenneth Leatherman was born in Lincoln County, North Carolina, the son of John Bingham Leatherman and Ada Annis Gantt. He studied at North Carolina State University where he obtained a degree in civil engineering. After graduation in 1953, Leatherman started working at a concrete plant in Charlotte. In 1955, he formed his own concrete company called Florence Concrete Products with a business partner in Florence, South Carolina. Leatherman continued to own around 16 percent of the company and to receive a salary from it despite stepping aside as its president in 1991. Critics of Hugh Leatherman raised concerns about his continued relationship with his concrete business and his position overseeing the state budget and Transportation Department. Since 2001, the Florence Concrete Company has received at least $28 million in transportation contracts from the state.

Leatherman was married twice, first to Joyce Jerline Smith in 1952; with whom he had four children, three daughters and a son. After his divorce in 1977, he married Jean Helms Allen in 1978, and had two more daughters.

== Career ==
=== First decade in the South Carolina Senate ===
Leatherman began his political career after his election in 1967 to the Town Council in Quinby, South Carolina. He served as a Councilman until 1976. Leatherman was elected to the South Carolina Senate as a Democrat in 1981. In his first year in office, he formed a bipartisan voting bloc with other freshman senators including Harvey S. Peeler Jr. He also became chairman of the legislative Highway Oversight Committee during this term. In 1986, he won 9 percent of the vote in the Democratic gubernatorial primary. During that run for office, he traveled South Carolina in a van and touted his business experience. He finished last in the primary. Leatherman was in office when an FBI sting ended with 17 statehouse lawmakers being convicted of crimes, generally for public corruption.

Leatherman switched parties and became a Republican in 1994 following other politicians in what was dubbed the Republican Revolution. Soon after, he created and led the Senate Republican caucus. In 2001, he orchestrated the Republican takeover of the state Senate by convincing his longtime mentor Senator Verne Smith to switch parties. That year, he became Senate Finance chairman after the Republicans got rid of a rule in the state senate rewarding committee chairmanships by seniority regardless of party. His relationships with Senate Democrats nonetheless led to some criticism, notably from Shane Massey.

=== Power and infrastructure ===
As chairman of the Senate Finance Committee, Leatherman effectively controlled the state budget; South Carolina state Treasurer Curtis Loftis stated in 2020 that "nothing of importance happens in South Carolina without his approval." Since joining the General Assembly, Leatherman focused upon infrastructure projects. He was instrumental in bringing Boeing to South Carolina in 2009 with a $450 million tax incentives package. His Senate portrait unveiled in 2017 included a model Boeing 737 in the background. He is also seen as having been instrumental in attracting Honda to Timmonsville by convincing the South Carolina Department of Transportation to build an interchange. He also received credit for securing funding for roads which lead to Myrtle Beach.

Leatherman was criticized for the amount of funding his home district receives from the state budget. He brought about massive expenditure in downtown Florence including a $17 million library, an arts center, and a county museum. In 2015, he convinced the state Department of Mental Health to change plans for a proposed home for aging veterans. The Department subsequently split the large development into two and located one of the new locations in Florence. Expansion of the Pamplico Highway attracted particular negative attention. A former mayor of Florence, Frank Willis, said that those who live in the Pee Dee had long complained that they had been abandoned by the State, but the game changed when Leatherman took power.

Leatherman used Richard Quinn's political consulting firm. Quinn was indicted in 2017 on charges of criminal conspiracy and illegal lobbying.

Leatherman was responsible for securing $300 million in state funding for deepening of Charleston Harbor in 2011. By the end of 2021, the harbor will be the deepest harbor on the East Coast. The Hugh K. Leatherman Port Terminal accompanied the harbor deepening and opened in 2021. It was one of the largest economic development projects in the history of South Carolina.

=== Key votes ===
As a member of the Budget and Control Board, a joint legislative-executive board that controlled South Carolina's budget, Leatherman voted against cutting $238.2 million from the state budget in 2009. Following the failure of the V.C. Summer nuclear expansion project, Leatherman established a committee to investigate what had occurred. He also forced the end of a two-year-long filibuster in 2017 from Senator Tom Davis who had been stalling a state tax increase on gasoline.

During the COVID-19 pandemic, Leatherman was one of two senate republicans who voted on a failed bill that would have given public college students $250 scholarships if they received a COVID-19 vaccination. Further, Leatherman represented the Senate in a conference committee to reconcile the 2021–2022 state budget. The Senate-approved budget calls for a 2 percent raise for all state employees as well as an additional $1,000 more in cash for teachers.

=== Feuds with governors ===
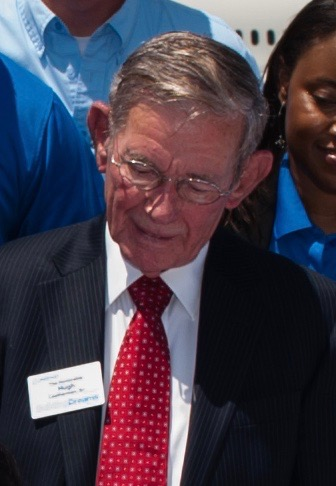
Leatherman in May 2013

Leatherman feuded with both Governor Mark Sanford and Governor Nikki Haley. During the Sanford administration, Leatherman alongside Senator Glenn F. McConnell and House Speaker Bobby Harrell held most of the power in the state. The feud between Leatherman and Sanford was bitter. Sanford attempted to consolidate power within the executive branch but he was effectively rebuffed by the General Assembly who overrode most of his vetoes.

In her last term in office, Governor Nikki Haley claimed that Leatherman was solely responsible for preventing ethics reform in the General Assembly. In 2016, she endorsed Leatherman's opponent in the Republican primary. This decision effectively stymied the rest of her policy agenda. After winning the 2016 primary, Leatherman said that Haley wasn't just a lame duck but a "dead duck."

=== Senate president pro tempore ===
In November 2016, President-elect Donald Trump announced his intention to nominate Governor Nikki Haley to be the next United States Ambassador to the United Nations. As President Pro Tempore, Leatherman would have been next in line to become Lieutenant Governor of South Carolina upon Haley's confirmation and the ascension of Henry McMaster to the governorship. Leatherman, however, stated that he would refuse the position.

On January 24, 2017, when Haley was sworn in as U.N. Ambassador and McMaster became the 117th Governor of South Carolina, Leatherman resigned from his leadership position in the South Carolina Senate in order to avoid ascending to the Office of Lieutenant Governor. He was succeeded as President Pro Tempore by Kevin L. Bryant, who then became the 92nd Lieutenant Governor of South Carolina. The position of President Pro Tempore was then made vacant again until the next day when Leatherman was re-elected as President Pro Tempore on a 28–16 vote. The sixteen senators who voted nay were Republicans. Among the no votes were Senate Majority Leader Shane Massey who stated that re-electing Leatherman violated "the spirit and intent of the constitution."

In December 2018, it was announced that the position of President Pro Tempore would be abolished due to a constitutional change that removed the Lieutenant Governor as President of the Senate, and replaced the position of President Pro Tempore with a President elected from the Senate membership. The change weakened Leatherman's power as he could no longer be both Senate Finance chairman and Senate president.

== Death ==
On October 22, 2021, it was announced that Leatherman was receiving hospice care at his home in Florence for "advanced and aggressive" intestinal cancer, which was inoperable. He died on November 12, 2021, at age 90. Leatherman was succeeded by Mike Reichenbach.

South Carolina Senate
Preceded by John C. Land III	Majority Leader of the South Carolina Senate; 2001–2005	Succeeded by Harvey S. Peeler Jr.
Preceded by Yancey McGill	President pro tempore of the South Carolina Senate; 2014–2017	Succeeded by Kevin L. Bryant
Preceded by Kevin L. Bryant	President pro tempore of the South Carolina Senate; 2017–2019	Succeeded by Harvey S. Peeler Jr. as President of the South Carolina Senate
