= Action at Abraham's Creek =

Action of the American Civil War

- Part of American Civil War
Date	September 13, 1864
Location	Frederick County, Virginia
Result	Union victory

Belligerents
United States (Union)	(Confederate States of America) CSA (Confederacy)

Commanders and leaders
John Baillie McIntosh	James Conner

Strength
Cavalry brigade	Infantry brigade

Casualties and losses
None reported	About 173 prisoners

The action at Abraham's Creek was an engagement on September 13, 1864 between Union Army and Confederate States Army forces during a Union reconnaissance in force toward Winchester, Virginia. The action occurred during skirmishing, maneuvering and scouting before the Third Battle of Winchester on September 19, 1864 in the Valley Campaigns of 1864 during the American Civil War. The Union force successfully completed the mission and captured about 173 Confederate prisoners.

The reconnaissance was conducted by the 1st Brigade, 3rd Division of the Cavalry Corps of the Union Army of the Shenandoah under the command of Colonel, later Brigadier General, John Baillie McIntosh in order to determine Confederate strength around the Berryville Pike approaching Winchester. McIntosh's force comprised the 1st Regiment Connecticut Volunteer Cavalry, 3rd New Jersey Volunteer Cavalry, 2nd Regiment New York Volunteer Cavalry, 5th Regiment New York Volunteer Cavalry, 2nd Ohio Cavalry, 18th Pennsylvania Cavalry Regiment and Battery M of the 2nd United States Artillery Regiment.

On September 13, 1864, Union cavalry division commander, Brigadier General James H. Wilson ordered McIntosh to scout the Berryville Pike, also shown as the Berryville–Winchester Road. McIntosh's force moved down the pike and crossed Opequon Creek where his men captured about 30 Confederate prisoners. Moving on to Abraham's Creek, about 2 miles (3.2 km) from Winchester, McIntosh's brigade charged and broke through a line of Confederate infantry from Brigadier General James Conner's brigade and captured the entire 8th South Carolina Infantry Regiment under Colonel J. W. Henagan, which scattered before the charging cavalrymen, and the regiment's flag. Due to the attrition in regiments prior to that date, the 8th South Carolina Infantry comprised 14 officers and 92 men. At the same time, McIntosh's men captured 2 officers and 35 men from six different Virginia mounted regiments which had been consolidated with 8 other regiments in Brigadier General William R. Terry's brigade.

On September 17, 1864, McIntosh's force burned a mill on Abraham's Creek near the Winchester Pike and Jones Mill on Opequon Creek.

McIntosh was wounded and lost a leg at the Third Battle of Winchester, two days later.
