= David Pascoe =

American politician (born 1967)

Solicitor for the First Judicial Circuit of South Carolina
- Incumbent
- Assumed office January 2005
- Preceded by: Robby Robbins

Personal details
- Born: David Michael Pascoe; March 2, 1967 (age 59) Charlottesville, Virginia, U.S.
- Party: Democratic (before 2025); Republican (2025–present)
- Children: 3
- Education: The Citadel (BA); University of South Carolina (JD)

David Michael Pascoe (born March 2, 1967) is an American lawyer serving as the First Circuit Solicitor in the state of South Carolina since 2005. The First Circuit comprises Dorchester, Calhoun, and Orangeburg counties. In 2016, Pascoe won a Supreme Court case against the South Carolina Attorney General where the Attorney General attempted to remove Pascoe as the special prosecutor in a corruption probe involving the General Assembly. Pascoe oversaw the investigation as Acting Attorney General and secured convictions on five powerful South Carolina General Assembly members that included the House speaker, President Pro Tem of the Senate, Chairman of the House Judiciary, and two former House Majority Leaders.

== Education and early career ==
Pascoe is a Magna Cum Laude graduate of The Citadel and the University of South Carolina School of Law. He served as assistant state prosecutor from 1993 to 2005 successfully trying over 200 violent crimes. Included in those prosecutions is a "no body" case in which the Defendant was convicted of murder even though the victim's body was never found. He earned a reputation as being a hard line prosecutor on violent crimes but progressive in dealing with juvenile offenders and non-violent offenders.

== Political career ==
=== First Circuit Solicitor ===
Pascoe ran for First Circuit Solicitor as a Democrat in 2000, unsuccessfully challenging Republican incumbent Walter Bailey. Upon Bailey's retirement, Robby Robbins was appointed by Governor Mark Sanford. Pascoe defeated Robbins in the 2004 general election.

After taking office in 2005, Pascoe immediately put a plan together to aggressively combat violent crime in the circuit while at the same time establishing a progressive agenda to curb juvenile crime. He implemented a number of new programs. He recruited churches and organizations to start a Youth Mentor Program. The First Circuit Solicitor's Youth Mentor Program was recognized by the South Carolina Department of Juvenile Justice as the 2011 Diversion Program of the Year. Pascoe also implemented the Circuit's first youth and adult drug court programs. Pascoe continues to garner his reputation as being tough on violent offenders and successfully convicted and received death sentences on two murderers, Mikal Mahdi and Kenneth Justus.

Pascoe served as President of the South Carolina Solicitor's Association from 2011 to 2013.

==== Endorsements ====
As a Democrat, Pascoe spoke to numerous GOP groups around the state on issues of criminal justice and judicial reform. He also endorsed several local Republican candidates in the 2024 South Carolina elections such as Ninth Circuit Solicitor Scarlett Wilson, Dorchester County Sheriff candidate Sam Richardson, and Senate District 29 Candidate JD Chaplin. In his endorsement of Chaplin, Pascoe stated, "The two-party system in South Carolina is not Republican versus Democrat, but those who strive to serve the people versus those who aim to serve themselves." All three republicans defeated their Democratic opponent. Pascoe endorsed Vice President Joe Biden in the 2020 Democratic Presidential primary but did not endorse him in 2024.

=== 2026 South Carolina Attorney General race ===
On April 10, 2025, Pascoe announced that he was leaving the Democratic Party and joining the Republican Party. During that announcement, Pascoe also stated that he was considering a run for the South Carolina Attorney General seat, which could be vacated if incumbent Alan Wilson ran for governor in 2026.

On June 23, 2025, Wilson launched his gubernatorial campaign. Pascoe's fundraising for the state Attorney General seat was reported to have eclipsed the other Republican candidates in the race, as of August 2025 to include Eighth Circuit solicitor David Stumbo and State Representative Stephen Goldfinch. Pascoe came in third, with Stumbo ultimately winning the nomination.

== Corruption probe ==
On December 5, 2013, the South Carolina Law Enforcement Division (SLED) submitted an investigative report to the Office of the Attorney General regarding the conduct of South Carolina Speaker of the House of Representatives Robert "Bobby" Harrell. A State Grand Jury case was initiated on the basis of the SLED report. Counsel for Speaker Harrell moved to have Attorney General Alan Wilson recused from the case. Pascoe accepted Attorney General Alan Wilson's designation as special prosecutor in the matter prior to a judge ruling on the recusal motion. On September 10, 2014, Pascoe indicted Speaker Harrell for multiple violations of state ethics laws. Speaker Harrell was removed from office on October 22, 2014, and received a sentence of three years probation after pleading guilty to six counts of misuse of campaign funds.

On October 1, 2014, Pascoe sent an email to Attorney General Wilson referencing the December SLED report and stating that he believed legislators named in the report should be investigated as part of a corruption probe. Approximately nine months later on July 17, 2015, the Attorney General's Office requested SLED forward the report to Pascoe for a prosecutive decision. In March 2016, Pascoe and SLED Chief Mark Keel referred the case to the State Grand Jury by signing a case initiation form. Shortly thereafter, a dispute arose in which the Attorney General's Office claimed that Pascoe did not have the authority to initiate a State Grand Jury investigation, and that only the elected Attorney General could legally sign the initiation form. The Attorney General then sent an e-mail to Pascoe purporting to fire him from the case. In an unprecedented move, Pascoe filed a petition for declaratory judgement with the South Carolina Supreme Court seeking a declaration that the Attorney General recused himself from the case and vested authority in Pascoe to conduct the investigation. Pascoe argued the case himself while the Attorney General's Office retained the law firm of Nelson Mullins to argue on its behalf. The case was heard by the South Carolina Supreme Court on June 16, 2016, and the Court ruled in favor of Pascoe, holding that a strict interpretation requiring the personal signature of the elected office holder "would lead to an absurd result." The Court also gave Pascoe the "full authority to act as the Attorney General for purposes of the investigation."

Pascoe and SLED proceeded to thoroughly investigate two legislators who had served previously as House Majority Leaders, Representatives James "Jimmy" Merrill and Richard "Rick" Quinn Jr. Throughout the course of the grand jury investigation, Pascoe and his team discovered criminal conduct by other legislators as well as a political consulting firm associated with these legislators. Pascoe faced numerous challenges by targets of the investigation who sought to remove him, however, Pascoe prevailed in each courtroom battle. These discoveries, as well as other findings and conclusions, were summarized in a comprehensive grand jury report issued by the State Grand Jury on June 21, 2018.

The investigation is often referred to as "Pascoe's corruption probe," though Pascoe has only referred to it as the "State Grand Jury's investigation". The investigation resulted in conviction and removal from office of some of South Carolina's most powerful legislators. It also held corporate entities accountable. The business at the center of the investigation is Richard Quinn and Associates and was at one time arguably the most powerful consulting company in the state. Many of the state's most powerful figures were once clients of RQA including Attorney General Alan Wilson. The corporation pleaded guilty to unlawful lobbying on December 13, 2017, and is believed to be the only conviction recorded for the offense in the state.

In September 2018 Pascoe negotiated agreements with five of the state's most powerful corporations to settle potential criminal liability stemming from their dealings with Richard Quinn and Associates. The agreements, which were referred to as "corporate integrity agreements", were unprecedented in the state, however Pascoe argued that the agreements are a permissible use of his prosecutive authority.

On June 21, 2018, the State Grand Jury issued a comprehensive report that detailed its findings and conclusions after two years of investigation. The issuance of reports discussing the investigative work of a grand jury is not common in South Carolina and subjects of the report attempted to block its public release. Pascoe sought, and ultimately won the approval of the presiding judge of the state grand jury to publicly release the document without redactions. The report detailed the manner in which Quinn's consulting firm profited from its significant political connections by receiving lucrative retainers from corporations interested in expanding their political influence. The report also discussed the prevalence of undisclosed "dark money" spent by large corporations to influence elections and the problematic relationship between the Attorney General and the targets of the investigation.

=== Indictments ===
- James "Jimmy" Merrill pleaded guilty on September 1, 2017, to statutory misconduct in office, was forced to resign from office, and was sentenced to probation.
- Richard "Rick" Quinn, Jr. was indicted by the State Grand Jury on May 16, 2017, for statutory and common law misconduct in office. On December 13, 2017, he resigned from office and pleaded guilty to statutory misconduct in office. The trial court took two months before sentencing Mr. Quinn Jr. to probation. Interpretation of the plea agreement was subject to significant disagreement between Pascoe and the trial court. Pascoe appealed the guilty plea and sentence issued by the court, but the South Carolina Supreme Court ruled that the State was prohibited from appealing a guilty plea under the circumstances. The plea agreement was the subject of controversy, resulting in both criticism and praise of Pascoe's decision to permit the plea.
- John Courson pleaded guilty to common law misconduct in office on March 16, 2017, for laundering $160,000 of campaign money through his political consultant, Richard Quinn and Associates. At the time of his guilty plea, Mr. Courson served as the President Pro Tempore of the South Carolina Senate. Mr. Courson maintained his innocence until the eve of trial, calling the investigation a "witch hunt". However, on the morning that his case was scheduled for a jury trial he agreed to plead guilty, resign his position, and cooperate with the investigation. Although he has entered a guilty plea, Mr. Courson awaits sentencing.
- Jim Harrison is currently the only target of the investigation to face a trial by jury and is believed to be the first member of the General Assembly to be tried and convicted of misconduct in office in South Carolina. On October 26, 2018, a Richland County jury returned guilty verdicts against Mr. Harrison for statutory misconduct in office, common law misconduct in office, and perjury. The Court sentenced Mr. Harrison to 18 months in prison, making him the first state lawmaker to receive a prison sentence in the investigation.
- The state grand jury also issued indictments against former House Representative Tracy Edge for statutory misconduct in office, common law misconduct in office, and perjury on October 18, 2017, and a single 12 count indictment against Richard Quinn, Sr. for perjury and obstruction of justice on April 18, 2019. Those cases are still pending.

South Carolina is one of the few states where Supreme Court Justices are elected by the legislature. The Supreme Court upheld Harrison's perjury conviction and 18 month prison sentence, but granted him a new trial on the other charges by a 3–2 decision. The majority opinion commended Pascoe for bringing the corruption to light, but that he lacked jurisdiction to prosecute the case due to the confusion of the Court's decision in Pascoe v. Wilson. The Court stated in its 36 page opinion that, "This is a difficult case, one that has resulted in a sharply divided Court."

Pascoe's string of public corruption convictions and removals from office of some of the state's most powerful lawmakers has been hailed as "a unique achievement in state politics in the modern era", but came to an end with his letter to the Attorney General's Office on February 16, 2021. Pascoe delivered the remaining pending prosecutions to the Attorney General's Office. His letter states "The citizens of this State deserve justice in matters of public corruption...Prosecuting legislative corruption is a Sisyphean task- this is even more true in our State, as emphasized by the 28th State Grand Jury in their report. But the effort spent bringing corruption to light is unquestionably worthwhile."

== Confederate flag controversy at The Citadel ==
A Confederate Naval Jack has been on display in The Citadel's Summerall Chapel since 1939. On July 22, 2020, Pascoe wrote a letter to the college's President General Glenn M. Walters asking that he remove the flag from above the Chapel. Pascoe noted in his letter that, "the presence of the Confederate battle flag in our sacred chapel is a moral stain that runs contrary to The Citadel's teachings. Simply put, the flag persists as a symbol of slavery, prejudice, and defiance of the American promise in the right of all people to be free...The flag should go."
