= Mike Reichenbach (politician) =

American politician from South Carolina

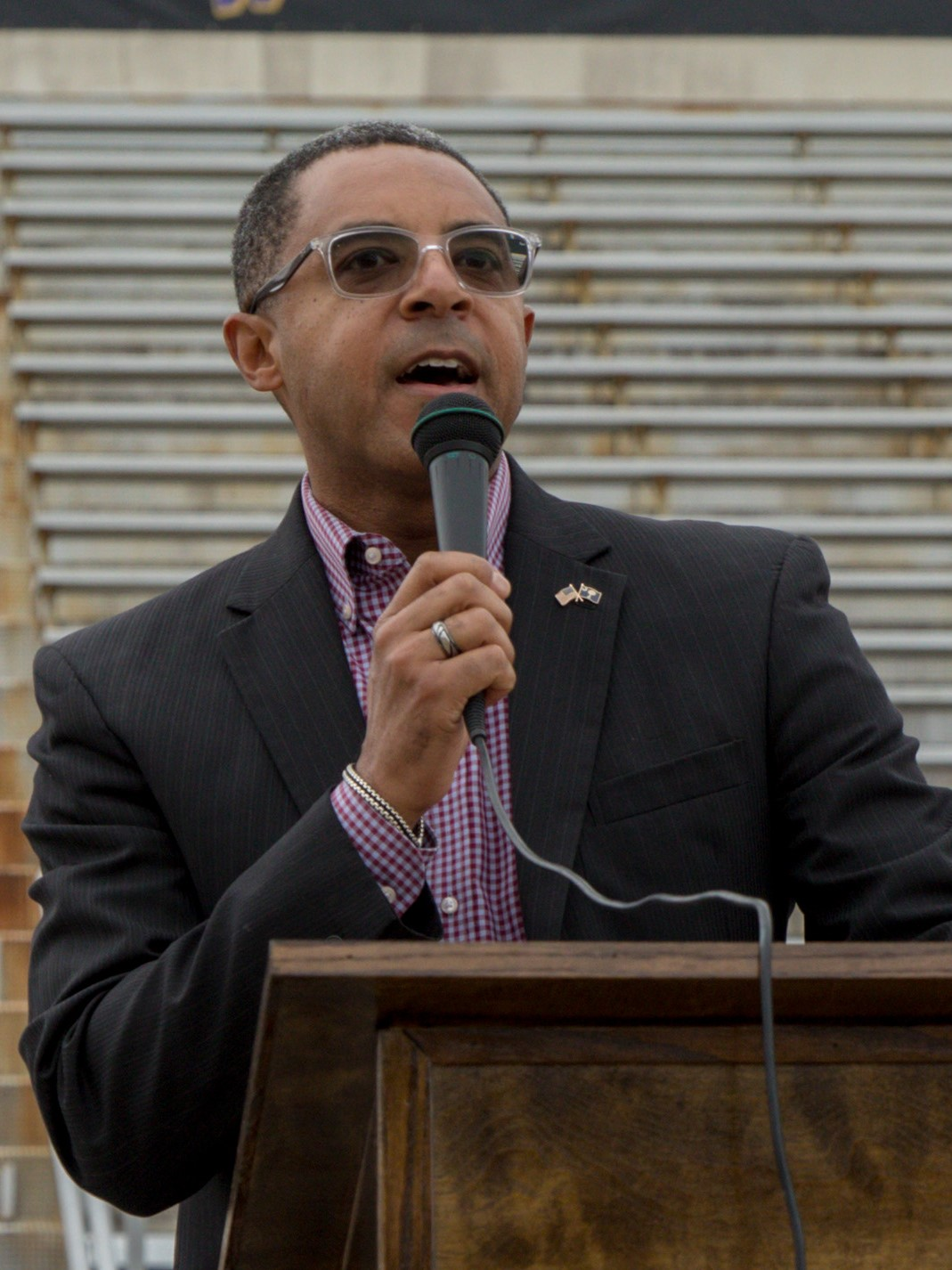
- Reichenbach in 2022

Lieutenant Governor-elect of South Carolina
- Assuming office January 13, 2027
- Governor: Alan Wilson (elect)
- Succeeding: Pamela Evette

Member of the South Carolina Senate from the 31st district
- Incumbent
- Assumed office April 4, 2022
- Preceded by: Hugh Leatherman

Personal details
- Born: Johnathan Michael Reichenbach; October 29, 1971 (age 55) Lima, Ohio, U.S.
- Party: Republican
- Spouse: Charisse Reichenbach (m. 1996)
- Children: 2
- Education: Bowling Green State University (BA); University of Michigan (MBA)

Johnathan Michael Reichenbach is an American businessman and politician serving as a member of the South Carolina Senate, representing District 31 (Darlington and Florence Counties).

A Republican, Reichenbach is the lieutenant governor-elect of South Carolina. He will be the first Black Lieutenant governor since Alonzo J. Ransier (1870 - 1872) and Richard Howell Greaves (1872 - 1876) held the office during Reconstruction.

Reichenbach was first elected through a special election after the passing of Hugh Leatherman.

Reichenbach announced his resignation from the South Carolina state senate on Tuesday, November 17, 2026. His resignation from the state senate goes into effect on January 13, 2027. The day he will be sworn in as South Carolina Lieutenant Governor.

== Early life, education and career ==
Reichenbach was born to a 14 year old mother, who gave him up for adoption. He owns car dealerships in Florence and Hilton Head Island.

In 1994, Reichenbach graduated from Bowling Green State University and in 2000 earned an MBA from the University of Michigan.

== Political career ==
=== South Carolina Senate ===
==== Elections ====
===== 2022 special election =====
After the death of incumbent Senator Hugh Leatherman in 2021, a special election was set for March 29, 2022. Reichenbach announced, and defeated state Rep. Jay Jordan, R-Florence, in the GOP primary, held January 24, 2022. Reichenbach went on to defeat Democratic Party nominee Suzanne La Rochelle in the special election. He was sworn in on April 5, 2022.

==== Tenure ====
Reichenbach serves on following Committees:

- Agriculture and Natural Resources
- Corrections and Penology
- Family and Veterans' Services
- Fish, Game and Forestry
- Judiciary

===== 2024 election =====
In 2024, Reichenbach defeated Democratic challenger, Former Florence County Magistrate Judge Belinda Timmons.

=== 2026 lieutenant gubernatorial campaign ===
On January 9, 2026, Alan Wilson, South Carolina Attorney General and gubernatorial candidate, announced his selection of Reichenbach as his choice for Lieutenant governor and running mate.

On June 26, 2026, Wilson defeated Lt. Governor Pamela Evette in a runoff. He and Reichenbach become the Republican nominees for the Governor and Lt Governor's race.

On November 3, 2026, Wilson and Reichenbach defeated Democratic party nominee Jermaine Johnson, United Citizens Party nominee Michael Addison and South Carolina Green Party candidate Walid Hakim in the general election.

On November 16, 2026, he announced his resignation from the South Carolina Senate, effective January 13, 2027.

Party political offices
Preceded by Pamela Evette	Republican nominee for Lieutenant Governor of South Carolina; 2026	Most recent
