= Todd Atwater =

American politician

Member of the South Carolina House of Representatives from the 87th district
- In office November 8, 2010 – November 12, 2018
- Preceded by: Nikki Haley
- Succeeded by: Paula Rawl Calhoon

Personal details
- Born: March 9, 1966 (age 60) Greenville, South Carolina
- Party: Republican
- Education: Wofford College (BS); University of South Carolina, Columbia (JD)

Todd Atwater (born March 9, 1966) is an American politician and attorney. A member of the Republican Party, he served in the South Carolina House of Representatives from the 87th district from 2010 to 2018.

== Education ==
Atwater attended Wofford College. He interned for U.S. Representative Floyd Spence and later received his legal education from the University of South Carolina.

== Career ==
Atwater served as director for legislative affairs for Governor David Beasley, and was chief counsel at the United States Labor and Human Resources Committee under Senator Strom Thurmond. Outside of government, he was CEO of the Members Insurance Trust and Financial Services as well as CEO of the South Carolina Medical Association.

Atwater was elected to represent the 87th district of the South Carolina House of Representatives in 2010. In the 2018 South Carolina primary election, Atwater ran against Alan Wilson for the Republican nomination for Attorney General. Atwater finished second to Wilson, forcing a run-off election on June 26, 2018. In the run-off, Atwater lost to Wilson.
