= Greg Duckworth =

American politician

Member of the South Carolina House of Representatives from the 104th district
- In office November 12, 2014 – November 12, 2018
- Preceded by: Tracy Edge
- Succeeded by: William Bailey

Personal details
- Born: July 1, 1964 (age 62) Huntington, West Virginia, United States
- Party: Republican
- Education: West Virginia University
- Profession: Landscape Architect

Gregory D. 'Greg' Duckworth (born July 1964) is an American politician. He was a member of the South Carolina House of Representatives from the 104th District, serving from 2014 to 2018.

Duckworth served on North Myrtle Beach City Council in Horry County, South Carolina. He ran against Rep. Tracy Edge and defeated him in the Republican Primary.
