= Daniel R. McLeod =

American attorney and politician

Attorney General of South Carolina
- In office 1959–1983
- Governor: Fritz Hollings; Donald S. Russell; Robert Evander McNair; John C. West; James B. Edwards; Richard Riley
- Preceded by: Tolliver Cleveland Callison Sr.
- Succeeded by: Thomas T. Medlock

Personal details
- Born: October 6, 1913
- Died: May 15, 1985 (aged 71)
- Party: Democratic
- Education: Wofford College; University of South Carolina

Daniel R. McLeod (October 6, 1913 – May 5, 1985), also known as Dan McLeod, was an American attorney and politician. He served as attorney general of South Carolina from 1959 to 1983. At the time of his retirement, he was the longest serving state attorney general in the United States.

== Life and career ==
McLeod attended Wofford College and the University of South Carolina.

McLeod served as attorney general of South Carolina from 1959 to 1983. During his tenure, he argued before the U.S. Supreme Court that the Voting Rights Act of 1965 was unconstitutional in a case titled Hamm v. Rock Hill. McLeod also argued before the Supreme Court in Edwards v. South Carolina in which the Supreme Court addressed whether the convictions of marchers in South Carolina violated their freedom of speech, assembly, and petition for redress under the U.S. Constitution.

McLeod influenced state law as it related to state parks, the South Carolina Freedom of Information Act, the S.C. Court of Appeals, and the state's Budget and Control Board. He died on May 5, 1985, at the age of 71.

Party political offices
Preceded by Tolliver Cleveland Callison Sr.	Democratic nominee for Attorney General of South Carolina; 1958, 1962, 1966, 1970, 1974, 1978	Succeeded by Thomas T. Medlock
