= Thomas T. Medlock =

American politician

48th Attorney General of South Carolina
- In office January 3, 1983 – January 3, 1995
- Governor: Richard Riley; Carroll A. Campbell Jr.
- Preceded by: Daniel R. McLeod
- Succeeded by: Charlie Condon

Member of the South Carolina Senate from the 7th district
- In office 1972–1976

Member of the South Carolina House of Representatives for Richland County
- In office 1965–1972

Personal details
- Born: August 28, 1934 (age 92) Joanna, South Carolina, U.S.
- Party: Democratic
- Spouse: Laura Virginia Orr
- Children: Tom; Glenn
- Education: Wofford College
- Occupation: lawyer

Thomas Travis Medlock (born August 28, 1934) is an American politician and member of the Democratic Party from the state of South Carolina. He served as the 48th Attorney General of South Carolina from 1983 to 1995, in the South Carolina Senate from 1972 to 1976 and in the South Carolina House of Representatives from 1965 to 1972, representing Richland County, South Carolina. He ran for Governor of South Carolina in 1994 but lost in the Democratic primary. He is a lawyer in Columbia, South Carolina. He also wrote a book called Blood Red Spot.

Party political offices
Preceded by Daniel R. McLeod	Democratic nominee for Attorney General of South Carolina; 1982, 1986, 1990	Succeeded by Dick Harpootlian
