= John M. Daniel =

American attorney and politician

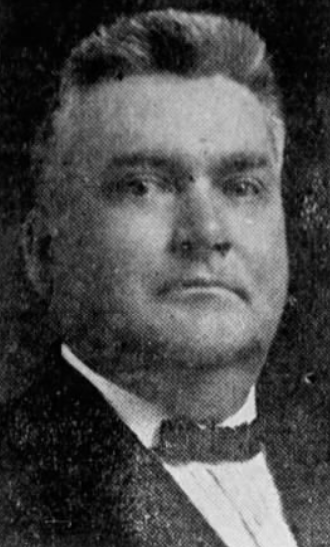
- Daniel in 1937

Member of the South Carolina House of Representatives
- In office 1911–1912

Attorney General of South Carolina
- In office 1924–1950
- Governor: Thomas Gordon McLeod; John Gardiner Richards Jr. Ibra Charles Blackwood; Olin D. Johnston; Burnet R. Maybank; Joseph Emile Harley; Richard Manning Jefferies; Ransome Judson Williams; Strom Thurmond
- Preceded by: Samuel M. Wolfe
- Succeeded by: Tolliver Cleveland Callison Sr.

Personal details
- Born: July 22, 1883 Edgefield County, South Carolina, U.S.
- Died: December 27, 1951 (aged 68)
- Party: Democratic
- Education: Furman University

John M. Daniel (July 22, 1883 – December 27, 1951), also known as John Mobley Daniel, was an American attorney and politician. He served as attorney general of South Carolina from 1924 to 1950.

== Life and career ==
Daniel was born in Edgefield County, South Carolina. He attended Furman University.

In 1911, Daniel was elected to the South Carolina House of Representatives, representing Greenville County, South Carolina.

Daniel served as attorney general of South Carolina from 1924 to 1950.

Daniel died on December 27, 1951, at the age of 68.
