= 3rd New Jersey Cavalry Regiment =

- Active: December 2, 1863 – August 1, 1865
- Country: United States of America
- Allegiance: Union
- Branch: Cavalry
- Engagements: Battle of the Wilderness; Battle of Spotsylvania Court House; Battle of Totopotomoy Creek; Battle of Cold Harbor; Battle of Haw's Shop; Battle of the Crater (2 companies); Action at Abraham's Creek; Third Battle of Winchester; Battle of Cedar Creek; Appomattox Campaign; Battle of Five Forks; Third Battle of Petersburg; Battle of Sailor's Creek; Battle of Appomattox Court House

The 3rd New Jersey Cavalry Regiment was a cavalry regiment that served in the Union Army during the American Civil War. The Butterflies or 1st United States Hussars Regiment, as they were known, were famous for being one of only two Union regiments designated as hussars, and the only one to serve with the Army of the Potomac.

== Equipment ==
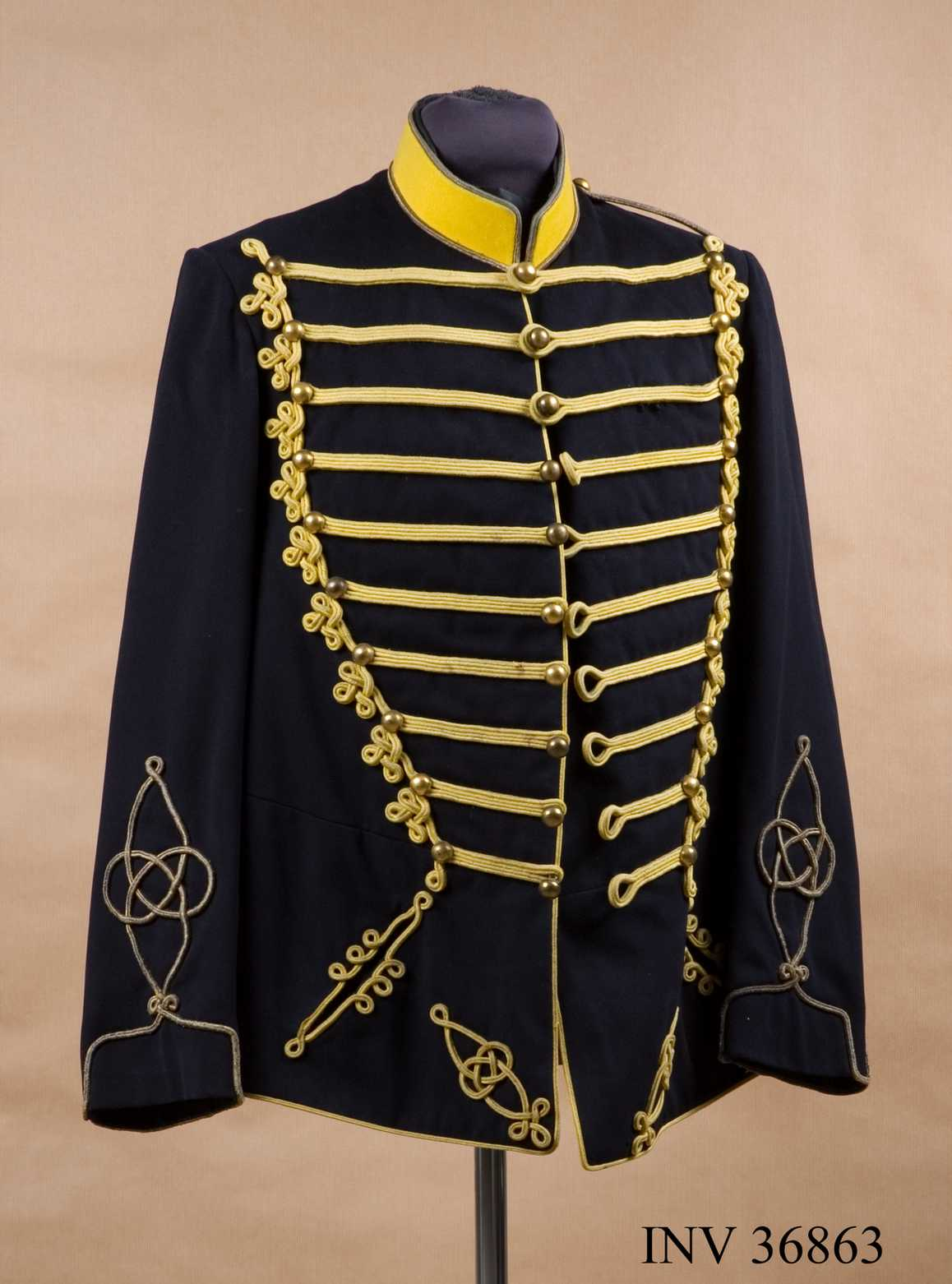
The uniform of the 3rd New Jersey was similar in appearance to this late 19th century Swedish dolman

The Butterflies were issued with a unique Austrian inspired uniform comprising a navy blue dolman with yellow chest braid, a peakless forage cap, and a short hooded cloak with red lining. Officers wore pelisses over their uniforms, and busbies were used for ceremonial occasions. In addition to being armed with a sabre and a pair of Remington New Model Army revolvers, each trooper was issued with a repeating Spencer carbine.

== Service ==
The 3rd New Jersey Cavalry Regiment was organized at Camp Bayard in Trenton, New Jersey and mustered in beginning December 2, 1863 under the command of Colonel Andrew J. Morrison.

The regiment was attached to Cavalry, IX Corps, Army of the Potomac, to May 1864. 1st Brigade, 3rd Division, Cavalry Corps, Army of the Potomac and Middle Military Division, to June 1865. Defenses of Washington, D.C., to August 1865.

The 3rd New Jersey Cavalry mustered out August 1, 1865 at Washington, D.C.

== Casualties ==
The regiment lost a total of 157 men during service; 3 officers and 47 enlisted men killed or mortally wounded, 2 officers and 105 enlisted men died of disease.

== Commanders ==
- Colonel Andrew J. Morrison - resigned August 29, 1863
- Colonel Alexander Cummings McWhorter Pennington Jr.

== See also ==
- List of New Jersey Civil War units
- New Jersey in the American Civil War
- Black Horse Troop, a hussar regiment in the Southern Army of Northern Virginia
