= Tracy Edge =

American politician

Member of the South Carolina House of Representatives from the 104th district
- In office January 7, 1997 – November 12, 2014
- Succeeded by: Greg Duckworth

Personal details
- Born: March 28, 1967 (age 59) Myrtle Beach, South Carolina, United States
- Party: Republican
- Education: University of South Carolina (B.A.); West Virginia University (M.S.)

Tracy Russell Edge (born March 28, 1967) is an American former politician.

== Political career ==
Edge was a member of the South Carolina House of Representatives from the 104th District, serving from 1997 to 2014. He served on the House Ways and Means Committee and was recognized as Legislator of the Year by numerous organizations.

In 2014, Edge was defeated in the Republican Primary by North Myrtle Beach City Councilman Greg Duckworth.

In 2017, Edge, then a former member of the South Carolina House of Representatives, was indicted for misconduct as part of the State Grand Jury public corruption investigation of the South Carolina General Assembly. Edge was sentenced to a $500 fine.
