= Kevin L. Bryant =

American politician (born 1967)

Kevin Bryant
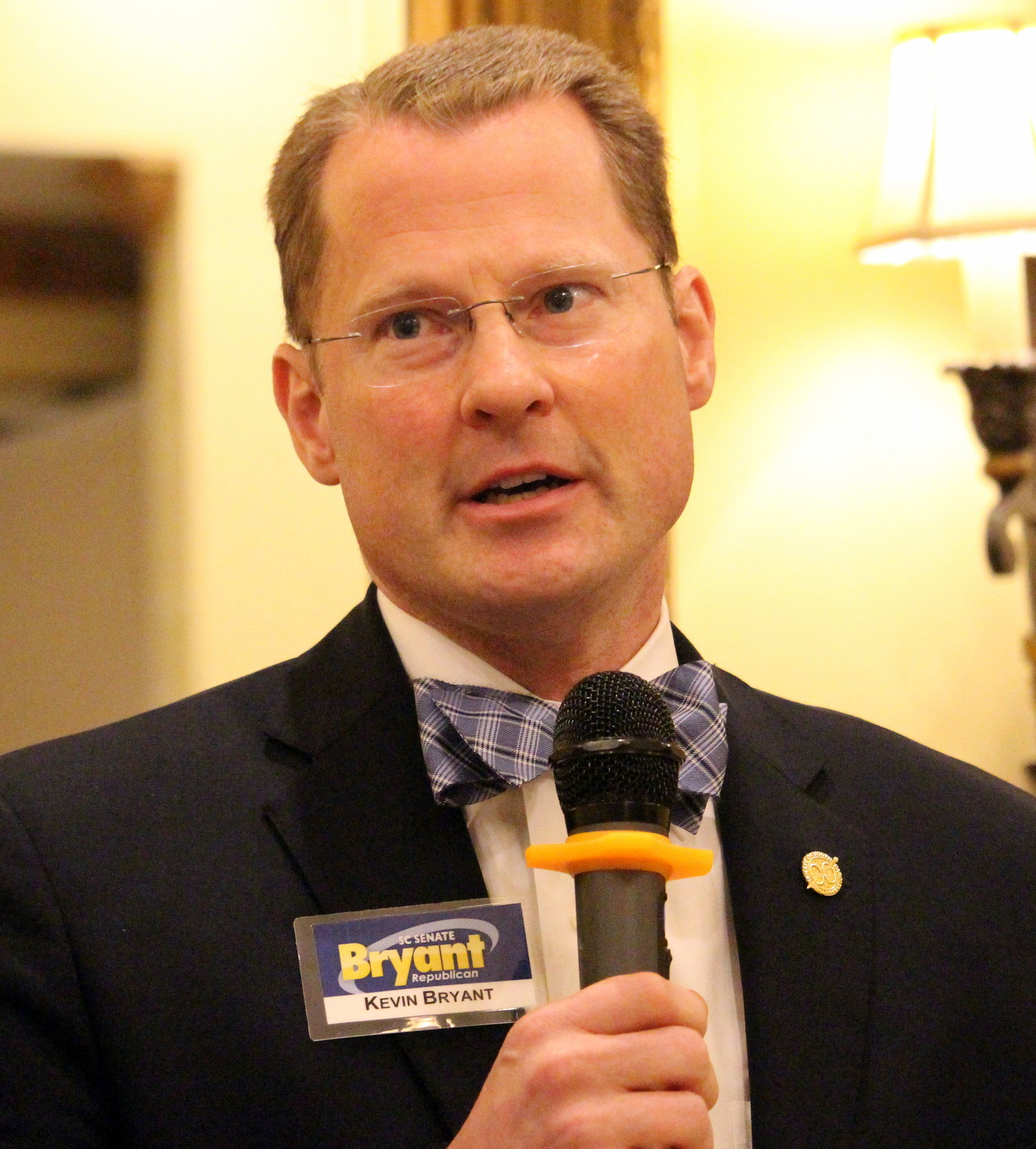
- Bryant in 2016

92nd Lieutenant Governor of South Carolina
- In office January 25, 2017 – January 9, 2019
- Governor: Henry McMaster
- Preceded by: Henry McMaster
- Succeeded by: Pamela Evette

President pro tempore of the South Carolina Senate
- In office January 24, 2017 (Note: Bryant was elected president pro tempore. Minutes later, he succeeded to the vacant office of lieutenant governor) – January 25, 2017
- Preceded by: Hugh Leatherman
- Succeeded by: Hugh Leatherman

Member of the South Carolina Senate from the 3rd district
- In office January 15, 2005 – January 25, 2017
- Preceded by: Bob Waldrep
- Succeeded by: Richard Cash

Personal details
- Born: February 19, 1967 (age 59) Anderson, South Carolina, U.S.
- Party: Republican
- Spouse: Ann Barinowski (m. 1989)
- Education: University of Georgia (BS)

Kevin L. Bryant (born February 19, 1967) is an American politician, pharmacist, and businessman. A member of the Republican Party, Bryant served as the 92nd lieutenant governor of South Carolina from January 25, 2017, to January 9, 2019, after serving in the South Carolina Senate from 2005 to 2017. He lost the Republican gubernatorial nomination in 2018 to Governor Henry McMaster.

== Background ==
Bryant is the son of Clifford W. and Gloria J. Bryant. Bryant has managed, with his brothers and father, Bryant Pharmacy & Supply, an independent pharmacy located in Anderson. He and his wife, Ann have three children. The family have attended a non-denominational New Testament fellowship, where Bryant has served as a deacon. Bryant earned a bachelor's degree from the University of Georgia. He is the president of Bryant Pharmacy and Supply.

== South Carolina Senate ==
Bryant was elected to the South Carolina Senate in 2004 to represent 3rd District based in Anderson County, South Carolina. He was re-elected in 2008, 2012 and 2016. Bryant is the chairman of the Invitations Committee, and he also sits on the Agriculture and Natural Resources, Finance, General and Labor, Commerce and Industry committees.

Bryant, a Republican, considers himself one of the most right-wing politicians in the state. He made national news when he introduced legislation to extend the death penalty to child rapists. The legislation was signed into law by then Governor Mark Sanford in 2006.

In 2008, Bryant attracted controversy after posting an image on his official campaign website of Osama bin Laden and presidential candidate Barack Obama, with the caption saying "the difference between Obama and Osama is just a little B.S."

Additionally, Bryant is an outspoken critic of government spending; he is a founding member of the William Wallace Caucus, a group of conservative senators who favor a laissez-faire approach to government policy and were fervid supporters of former Governor Mark Sanford. Bryant opposes same-sex marriage and supports a Constitutional amendment that would outlaw the practice, and he believes that man-made global warming is a myth.

Bryant is a Creationist who believes the entire Universe was created in a literal 6 days approximately 6,000 years ago.

== Lieutenant Governor of South Carolina (2017–2019) ==
Nikki Haley resigned as Governor of South Carolina on January 24, 2017, to become United States Ambassador to the United Nations. Henry McMaster, the lieutenant governor, automatically became governor at that time. Hugh Leatherman, the Senate president pro tempore, refused to become lieutenant governor per the South Carolina Constitution; Leatherman temporarily resigned as president pro tempore, and Bryant was elected to the position on January 25. This automatically promoted him to the vacant lieutenant governorship.

== 2018 gubernatorial election ==
Bryant ran for governor in the 2018 Republican Primary. He placed fourth behind Henry McMaster, John Warren, and Catherine Templeton. Bryant finished the race with 6.7% of the vote. After his defeat, he endorsed businessman John Warren.

South Carolina Gubernatiorial Primary (Republican), 2018
Candidate	Votes	%
Henry McMaster	155,072	42.3
John Warren	102,006	27.8
Catherine Templeton	78,432	21.4
Kevin L. Bryant	24,699	6.7
Yancey McGill	6,349	1.7

== Notes ==
South Carolina Senate
Preceded by Henry McMaster	President pro tempore of the South Carolina Senate; 2017	Succeeded by Henry McMaster
Political offices
Preceded by Henry McMaster	Lieutenant Governor of South Carolina; 2017–2019	Succeeded by Pamela Evette
