= Rick Quinn Jr. =

Former officeholder

Rick Quinn

Member of the South Carolina House of Representatives
- In office November 8, 2010 – December 13, 2017
- Preceded by: Ted Pitts Jr.
- Succeeded by: Chris Wooten
- Constituency: 69th district
- In office November 14, 1988 – November 9, 2004
- Preceded by: H. Parker Evatt
- Succeeded by: Nathan Ballentine
- Constituency: 71st district

Majority Leader of the South Carolina House of Representatives
- In office 1999–2004

Personal details
- Born: Richard Quinn Jr. June 22, 1965 (age 61) Columbia, South Carolina, U.S.
- Party: Republican
- Domestic partner: Amy McRae Benck
- Relations: Richard Quinn (father)

Richard Quinn Jr. is an American politician who served as a member of the South Carolina House of Representatives from 1988 to 2004 and again from 2010 to 2017.

== Early life and education ==
Quinn was born in Columbia, South Carolina. His father, Richard Quinn Sr., is a former political consultant. Rick Jr. graduated from the University of South Carolina.

== Career ==
Quinn served as South Carolina House Majority Leader from 1999 to 2004. He played a role in the removal of the Confederate flag from the South Carolina State House in 2015.

=== Conviction and resignation ===
On December 13, 2017, during the South Carolina Statehouse corruption investigation, he resigned from the South Carolina legislature after pleading guilty to a charge of misconduct while in office. The prosecutor, David Pascoe, had initially charged Quinn with two counts of misconduct, a charge of common law misconduct, and a charge of statutory law misconduct, but Quinn pleaded guilty to just one charge. Pascoe has been criticized for not taking Quinn to trial. Quinn was also charged with criminal conspiracy on October 28, 2017 but those chargers were dropped with the plea deal.

In 2018, the judge overseeing Quinn's sentencing gave him one year in prison, but suspended the order, ignoring the plea deal's recommended prison time. Instead, Quinn will have to do 500 hours of community service — “public service,” Circuit Court Judge Carmen Mullen said — and serve two years of probation after pleading guilty to one count of misdemeanor misconduct in office and was fined $1,000.

Prosecutor David Pascoe appealed his own plea deal with Rick Quinn Jr. to the South Carolina Supreme Court arguing that the initial judge overseeing the case had shown bias.

South Carolina House of Representatives
Preceded by H. Parker Evatt	Member of the South Carolina House of Representatives from the 71st district 1988–2004	Succeeded by Nathan Ballentine
Preceded by Edward H. "Ted" Pitts, Jr.	Member of the South Carolina House of Representatives from the 69th district 2010–2017	Succeeded by Chris Wooten
