= Nathan Ballentine =

American politician

Member of the South Carolina House of Representatives from the 71st district
- Incumbent
- Assumed office November 8, 2004
- Preceded by: Rick Quinn Jr.

Personal details
- Born: December 10, 1970 (age 55) Columbia, South Carolina, U.S.
- Party: Republican
- Education: University of South Carolina, Columbia

Nathan Ballentine (born December 10, 1970) is a Republican member of the South Carolina House of Representatives, United States, representing the House District 71 since 2004.

== Early years and family ==
Nathan was born in Richland County and has two children. He works for Movement Mortgage in Columbia, South Carolina.

== South Carolina House of Representatives ==
In the 2004 Republican primary, Ballentine defeated incumbent Rick Quinn, who had served as House Majority Leader.

Ballentine was elected Vice Chairman of the Medical, Military, Public and Municipal Affairs committee during his freshman year (2005). During his first term, Ballentine supported legislation related to healthcare; in his second term, he addressed fiscal policy initiatives.

During 2009 and 2010, Ballentine co-sponsored a bill with then-Representative Nikki Haley to require on-the-record voting in the legislature. That bill ultimately died in the Senate; but not before the House made a rule change and passed the bill unanimously, though it did not pass in the Senate. In 2011 Ballentine became lead sponsor for the On-The-Record Voting Bill.

In the 2010 session, a campaign finance disclosure bill sponsored by Ballentine was signed into law in 2010. The bill requires every elected official (from school board, to county office holders, etc.) to file their campaign disclosure report on-line.

During his career in the South Carolina General Assembly, Ballentine has served on several legislative committees, including the House Ways and Means Committee (budget) and the House Ethics Committee. Ballentine has received various taxpayer advocacy recognitions during his tenure, as well as being recognized as Legislator of the Year, and winning the Green Tie Award from the Conservation Voters of South Carolina.

Ballentine is currently (2025) the Chairman of the Ways and Means Higher Education Budget Subcommittee.

For years Ballentine did not keep his State House salary, donating it instead to community groups and organizations. Recently, when the House voted for an $18,000 pay raise, Ballentine refused and declined the increase. Years ago, he had voted against an earlier pay raise as well.
