= Tolliver Cleveland Callison Sr. =

American lawyer

T. C. Callison

Attorney General of South Carolina
- In office 1951–1958
- Governor: James F. Byrnes; George B. Timmerman, Jr. Ernest F. Hollings
- Preceded by: John M. Daniel
- Succeeded by: Daniel R. McLeod

Personal details
- Born: July 17, 1884 Callison, Edgefield County, South Carolina, United States
- Died: March 17, 1966 (aged 81) Columbia, South Carolina
- Political party: Democratic Party
- Education: Bailey Military Institute; University of South Carolina

Tolliver Cleveland Callison Sr. (July 17, 1884 – March 17, 1966) was an American lawyer and politician who served as Attorney General of South Carolina from 1951 to 1958. He advocated for South Carolina's segregationist laws.

== Early life ==
Tolliver Cleveland Callison was born on July 17, 1884, in Callison, Edgefield County, South Carolina, United States to Preston Brooks Callison and Mattie Ella (née White) Callison. His family had high social status in the county, and his father served two terms in the South Carolina General Assembly. Callison attended public schools and the Bailey Military Institute in Greenwood. He studied law at the University of South Carolina, graduating in 1909.

Callison married Margaret Elizabeth Reel on December 17, 1913. They had five children.

== Career ==
Callison was admitted to the bar in 1909 and moved to Lexington, South Carolina, two years later to practice law. During World War I he worked for the Edgefield County Food Administration. He also served as the superintendent of the Baptist Sunday School in Lexington for three years. In the early 1930s he helped organize the Lexington Depository, which became the Bank of Lexington in 1948. He thereafter served as its president until it merged with the First National Bank of South Carolina, and subsequently served as vice president of the merged entity until his death. He also served as president of the South Carolina State Board of Public Welfare.

Callison was a member of the Democratic Party. He served as chairman of the Lexington County Democratic Party from 1924 to 1940. He served as solicitor of the 11th Judicial Circuit from 1920 to 1936. From 1940 to 1951 he served as Assistant Attorney General of South Carolina.

In 1951 Callison became Attorney General of South Carolina. He served as a counsel for South Carolina during the arguments of Brown v. Board of Education before the United States Supreme Court. He defended racial segregation, arguing that both black and white South Carolinians would prefer separate schools and saying that South Carolina "recognizes the absolute right of each race to control its own social affairs without any governmental regulation of any kind or character." He chaired the Southern Association of Attorneys General in 1955. In 1957 Callison accused President Dwight D. Eisenhower of violating the United States Constitution when the latter federalized Arkansas troops to ensure the integration of Little Rock Central High School, saying, "A more serious crisis has never arisen in connection with internal affairs of the United States." He left the attorney general's office in 1958 and returned to private legal practice.

== Later life ==
Callison's wife died in 1960. In March 1966 he suffered a heart attack. He died on March 17 at Baptist Hospital in Columbia, South Carolina.

== Works cited ==
- Bell, Harold Leonard (1972). The Office of State Attorney General in the South (PhD thesis). University of Illinois at Urbana-Champaign. OCLC 77774350.
- Snowden, Yates, ed. (1920). History of South Carolina. Vol. 5. Chicago & New York: Lewis Publishing Company.
