= Reno v. Condon =

- Supreme Court of the United States

Argued November 10, 1999 Decided January 12, 2000
- Full case name: Reno v. Condon
- Citations: 528 U.S. 141 (more) 120 S. Ct. 666; 145 L. Ed. 2d 587; 2000 U.S. LEXIS 503

Case history
- Prior: Summary judgment granted, 972 F. Supp. 977 (D.S.C. 1997); affirmed, 155 F.3d 453 (4th Cir. 1998); cert. granted, 526 U.S. 1111 (1999).

Holding
- The DPPA did not run afoul of the federalism principles enunciated in New York v. United States and Printz v. United States, and was a valid exercise of Congress' power under the Commerce Clause.

Court membership
- Chief Justice William Rehnquist Associate Justices John P. Stevens · Sandra Day O'Connor; Antonin Scalia · Anthony Kennedy; David Souter · Clarence Thomas; Ruth Bader Ginsburg · Stephen Breyer

Case opinion
- Majority: Rehnquist, joined by unanimous

Laws applied
- U.S. Const. amend. X

Reno v. Condon, 528 U.S. 141 (2000), was a case in which the Supreme Court of the United States upheld the Driver's Privacy Protection Act of 1994 (DPPA) against a Tenth Amendment challenge.

== Facts and procedural history ==
State departments of motor vehicles (DMVs) require drivers and automobile owners to provide personal information, which may include a person's name, address, telephone number, vehicle description, Social Security number, medical information, and photograph, as a condition of obtaining a driver's license or registering an automobile. Finding that many States sell this information to individuals and businesses (particularly direct marketing and auto insurance companies) for significant revenues, and to prevent stalkers from tracking their victims across state lines, Congress enacted the Driver's Privacy Protection Act of 1994, 18 U.S.C. §§ 2721–2725, which established a regulatory scheme to restrict the States' ability to disclose a driver's personal information without the driver's consent.

South Carolina, represented by South Carolina attorney general Charlie Condon, filed suit, alleging that the DPPA violates the Tenth and Eleventh Amendments to the United States Constitution. Concluding that the DPPA is incompatible with the principles of federalism inherent in the Constitution's division of power between the States and the Federal Government, the United States District Court for the District of South Carolina granted summary judgment for the State and permanently enjoined the DPPA's enforcement against the State and its officers, and United States Court of Appeals for the Fourth Circuit affirmed. Janet Reno petitioned to the United States Supreme Court for review.

== Decision ==
Chief Justice Rehnquist delivered the opinion of a unanimous Court. He began by explaining the terms of the DPPA and how it conflicted with South Carolina's statutes governing drivers' license information. He held that 1) the DPPA was an acceptable exercise of Congress' powers under the Commerce Clause, because drivers' information was an "article of interstate commerce" within the terms of the Act, and 2) the DPPA did not "commandeer" state authority in the manner which the statutes involved in New York v. United States and Printz v. United States did. Instead, Rehnquist analogized the DPPA to the statute at issue in South Carolina v. Baker, 485 U.S. 505 (1988), which prohibited States from issuing unregistered bonds:

Like the statute at issue in Baker, the DPPA does not require the States in their sovereign capacity to regulate their own citizens. The DPPA regulates the States as the owners of databases. It does not require the South Carolina Legislature to enact any laws or regulations, and it does not require state officials to assist in the enforcement of federal statutes regulating private individuals. We accordingly conclude that the DPPA is consistent with the constitutional principles enunciated in New York and Printz.

Finally, Rehnquist addressed South Carolina's argument that Congress could only regulate the individual states by means of laws of "general applicability", rather than directly targeting state governments for regulation. Instead of determining whether such "general applicability" is indeed a Constitutional requirement, Rehnquist merely pointed out that the DPPA was "generally applicable", because in addition to regulating the actions of state governments, it also regulated private persons who resold or redistributed drivers' information.

== See also ==
- List of United States Supreme Court cases, volume 529
- List of United States Supreme Court cases
- Lists of United States Supreme Court cases by volume
