= Stephen Goldfinch =

American politician (born 1982)

Member of the South Carolina Senate from the 34th district
- Incumbent
- Assumed office November 14, 2016
- Preceded by: Raymond Cleary

Member of the South Carolina House of Representatives from the 108th district
- In office November 2012 – November 14, 2016
- Preceded by: Kevin R. Ryan
- Succeeded by: Lee Hewitt

Personal details
- Born: November 19, 1982 (age 43) Conway, South Carolina, U.S.
- Party: Republican
- Education: The Citadel (BS, MBA); Charleston School of Law (JD)

Stephen L. Goldfinch Jr. (born November 19, 1982) is an American politician. He is a member of the Republican party.

== Political career ==
=== South Carolina House of Representatives ===
Goldfinch served in the South Carolina House of Representatives from 2012 to 2016.

=== South Carolina Senate ===
Goldfinch is a member of the South Carolina Senate from the 34th District, serving in the legislature since 2017. Goldfinch serves on the Senate Finance, Fish Game and Forestry, Rules, and Agriculture and Natural Resources committees.

==== 2024 Presidential Election Endorsement ====
In June 2023, Goldfinch endorsed Tim Scott in the 2024 United States presidential election.

=== 2026 South Carolina Attorney General Election ===
Goldfinch expressed his interest in running for Attorney General of South Carolina, as incumbent Alan Wilson considered a run for Governor in 2026. In July 2025, Goldfinch officially announced his run for the office. His campaign platform emphasizes addressing government overreach, pursuing violent crime, and supporting law enforcement, with particular focus on combating fentanyl trafficking and organized crime.

== Personal life ==
As a captain in the National Guard, Goldfinch was reported injured on August 1, 2023, during a deployment to Camp Lemonnier in Djibouti Africa. He was transported to Landstuhl Germany for surgery and a Soldier Recovery Unit at Ft Stewart for rehabilitation.

South Carolina Congressman Russell Fry posted about the incident on social media. Later, reporters uncovered that the injury occurred after Goldfinch fell in a bunker. The next day during a physical training session at the base he reportedly tore his pectoral muscle and rotator cuff.
