= H. Parker Evatt =

American politician

Member of the South Carolina House of Representatives from the 71st district
- In office 1975–1982

Personal details
- Born: August 27, 1935 (age 90) Greenville, South Carolina
- Party: Republican
- Occupation: executive director

H. Parker Evatt (born August 27, 1935) was an American politician in the state of South Carolina. He served in the South Carolina House of Representatives from 1975 to 1982, representing Richland County, South Carolina. From 1987 to 1995, Evatt served as the director of the South Carolina Department of Corrections. He was an executive director of the Alston Wilkes Society.
