= John Courson =

American politician (born 1944)

John E. Courson
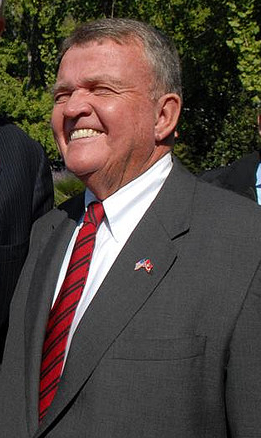

President pro tempore of the South Carolina Senate
- In office March 13, 2012 – June 4, 2014
- Preceded by: Glenn F. McConnell
- Succeeded by: Yancey McGill

Member of the South Carolina Senate from the 20th district
- In office December 15, 1985 – June 4, 2018
- Succeeded by: Dick Harpootlian

Personal details
- Born: November 21, 1944 (age 81) Columbia, South Carolina, U.S.
- Party: Republican
- Spouse: Elizabeth Exum

John E. Courson (born November 21, 1944) is an American former politician. He served as a Republican member of the South Carolina Senate, representing the 20th District from 1985 to 2018. He resigned after pleading guilty to a common law misconduct charge in office.

== Early life and education ==
John Courson was born on November 21, 1944, and graduated from the University of South Carolina in 1968.

== Career ==
He has served as a Republican state senator for South Carolina from 1985 to 2018. In 1998, he ran for Comptroller General of South Carolina, but lost to Jim Lander.

He was elected President Pro Tempore of the South Carolina Senate on March 13, 2012, but resigned this office on June 4, 2014, to avoid becoming Lieutenant Governor, a weak position that needed to be filled for six months before a new Lieutenant Governor was elected in 2014.

=== Resignation ===
In March 2017, during the South Carolina Statehouse corruption investigation, Courson was indicted on ethics charges for mishandling campaign funds and subsequently suspended from office. He resigned June 4, 2018, after pleading guilty to such charges.

=== Personal life ===
He is married to Elizabeth Poinsett Exum, and they have three children: James Poinsett, Elizabeth Boykin, and Harris Russell. He is Episcopalian.

Party political offices
Preceded by Dell Baker	Republican nominee for South Carolina Comptroller General; 1998	Succeeded by Richard Eckstrom
