= Charlie Condon =

American lawyer (born c. 1953)

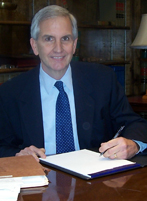

49th Attorney General of South Carolina
- In office January 15, 1995 – January 15, 2003
- Governor: David Beasley; Jim Hodges
- Preceded by: Thomas Medlock
- Succeeded by: Henry McMaster

Personal details
- Born: Charles Molony Condon Charleston, South Carolina, U.S.
- Party: Republican
- Spouse: Emily Condon
- Education: University of Notre Dame (B.A.); Duke University (J.D.)
- Profession: Attorney

Charles Molony Condon (born c. 1953) is a former Attorney General of the U.S. state of South Carolina. For part of his term, he concurrently served as the first chairman of the Republican Attorneys General Association. Condon is also a former Ninth Circuit solicitor (1980-1991); when he was elected to the position at the age of 27, he became the youngest solicitor in the history of South Carolina. In 2008, he was the chairman of John McCain's presidential campaign in South Carolina. He currently is an attorney in private practice in Mt. Pleasant outside his native Charleston, South Carolina.

== Public office ==
Condon was first elected attorney general in 1994. In his reelection in 1998, he defeated, 54-46 percent, the Democratic nominee, lawyer Tom Turnipseed, of the capital city of Columbia.

== Education ==
University of Notre Dame in South Bend, Indiana, Bachelor of Arts, 1975, magna cum laude

Duke University School of Law, Juris Doctor, 1978

== Domestic violence/Victim's bill of rights ==
While attorney general, Condon directed all prosecutors to follow a no-drop policy in domestic violence-related cases, even if victims are reluctant to press charges. (He also successfully pushed) The victims' bill of rights, . . . (which), would require that crime victims be treated "with fairness, respect and dignity." Prosecutors would have to tell crime victims about changes in their cases and give them access to case records after investigation are closed. Judges would ensure the mandates were followed.

== First Chairman of the Republican Attorneys General Association ==
Condon announced as the first chairman of the association, that the members would act as a policy organization to promote Republican ideas of limited government, crime fighting, and individual responsibility.

Asked about the new activism by many attorneys general, Mr. Condon, though cautioning that he could not speak for all Republicans in the post, said the line between the legislature and a state's chief legal executive had to be carefully drawn. Pointing to the national battle over teen-age smoking as an example, he said, 'I think everyone has his role, and in terms of limited government the idea of what should and shouldn't be done through the legislature rather thanthrough the judicial branch raises some serious questions.'"

In 2001, Attorney General Condon declared an open season on home invaders. He mandated that, "citizens' defending their home against invasion should not be arrested, charged or prosecuted." "The message needs to be sent loudly and clearly that the state is going to back the homeowner if their home is invaded," he said in an interview. "I'm putting home invaders on notice that if an occupant chooses to use deadly force, there will be no prosecution."But Mr. Condon said he was tired of seeing homeowners who defended their homes dragged through lengthy investigations and trials before being cleared, when it was obvious to him that they did nothing wrong.

"You don't want to put the homeowner in the position of saying, 'If I use deadly force, I might be cleared after a trial,'" Mr. Condon said. "That's tantamount to saying that people have rights, but there's a huge cross attached to it. Most courts have a laissez-faire attitude about these things, figuring that everything will come out fine after a trial. But I think we need to send the message that the home is sacred ground, period."

== Arguing before the U.S. Supreme Court: Reno v. Condon ==
While serving as Attorney General for South Carolina, Condon argued as respondent in the case Reno v. Condon. Congress enacted the Driver's Privacy Protection Act of 1994 (DPPA), which establishes a regulatory scheme that restricts the States' ability to disclose a driver's personal information without the driver's consent, after finding that many States sell such information. The DPPA conflicts with South Carolina law, under which information contained in the State's DMV records is available to any person or entity that fills out a form listing the requester's name and address and stating that the information will not be used for telephone solicitation. The Attorney General of South Carolina filed suit, alleging the DPPA violated the Tenth and Eleventh Amendments. After success in District court and Appeals Court, the suit wound up in front of the Supreme Court. Condon was successful in the Appeals Court which ruled that Congress was stepping illegally into state territory and noted further that there exists no constitutional right to privacy in information contained in public records. South Carolina Attorney General Charlie Condon, when hearing that the Supreme Court agreement to hear the case, said he believed citizens have a right to keep their privacy protected—which he says is guaranteed by a clause in the South Carolina Constitution. But the real question is who should be enforcing that protection Condon said. Condon and other state officials strongly believe that states should have full autonomy when it comes to administering public records. In the case before the Supreme Court, South Carolina will argue that the new federal law violates the 10th Amendment.

"The people of Carolina established drivers' records, maintained them, and have a right to determine their use," he said in a statement. "South Carolina should be run by South Carolinians. If the federal government can tell us what to do with these records, it can tell us we can't keep records at all. The 10th Amendment is the legal and spiritual guardian of state rights. Washington, D.C., is a long way from South Carolina, and the federal government needs to keep its distance."

Condon's appearance was received by the Court as political, and his position garnered a lively and entertaining round of questions from the more liberal members of the Court.

== Landmark cases ==
Whitner vs. State of South Carolina, 328 S.C.1, 492 S.E. 2d 771(1997)

State ex rel Condon vs. Hodges, 349 S.C. 232, 562 S.E. 2d 623 (2002)

== Current activities ==
Condon is a private practice attorney in Mt. Pleasant, South Carolina.

== See also ==
- Reno v. Condon

Party political offices
Vacant Title last held by Donald V. "Donnie" Myers	Republican nominee for Attorney General of South Carolina; 1994, 1998	Succeeded by Henry McMaster
