= James H. Merrill =

American politician

James Henry Merrill Jr.

Member of the South Carolina House of Representatives from the 99th district
- In office January 3, 2001 – August 31, 2017
- Preceded by: Henry E. Brown Jr.
- Succeeded by: Nancy Mace

Personal details
- Born: January 15, 1967 (age 59) Pensacola, Florida
- Party: Republican
- Spouse: Noel
- Children: Delaney, Haley, and Darby
- Profession: public relations

James (Jim) Henry Merrill Jr. is a former Republican politician. He was a member of the South Carolina House of Representatives from the 99th District, serving from 2001 to 2017.

During the South Carolina Statehouse corruption investigation, Merrill was suspended from office in 2016 after being indicted on ethics charges and resigned his position on August 31, 2017. He ultimately pleaded guilty to one count for not reporting income.

Through his father, US Military veteran Major James Henry Merrill Sr., Merrill is a cousin, once removed to author Myra Lewis Williams.

== Sources ==
- Williams, Myra Lewis (2016) The Spark that Survived, Deeds Publishing, Atlanta. ISBN 9781944193164.
