= Alan Wilson (politician) =

American politician (born 1973)

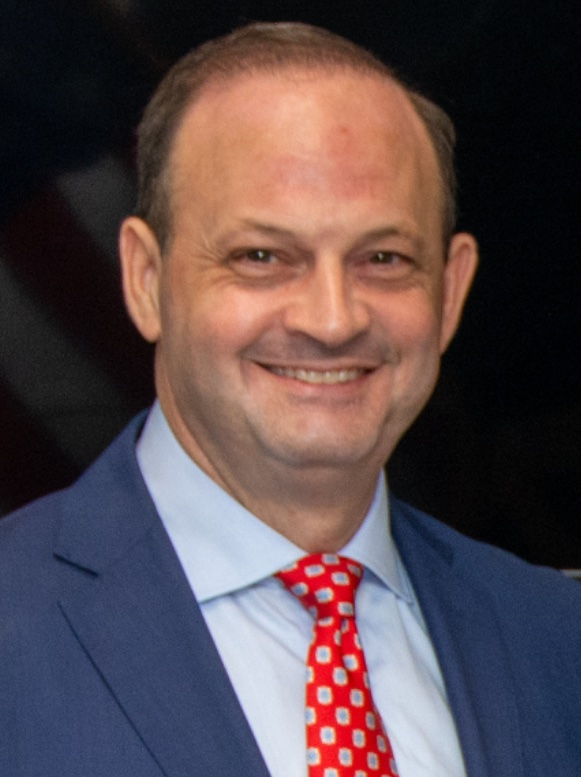
- Wilson in 2025

Governor-elect of South Carolina
- Assuming office January 13, 2027
- Lieutenant: Mike Reichenbach (elect)
- Succeeding: Henry McMaster

51st Attorney General of South Carolina
- Incumbent
- Assumed office January 12, 2011
- Governor: Nikki Haley; Henry McMaster
- Preceded by: Henry McMaster
- Succeeded by: David Stumbo (elect)

Personal details
- Born: Alan McCrory; July 16, 1973 (age 53) Fort Wolters, Texas, U.S.
- Party: Republican
- Spouse: Jennifer Miskewicz
- Children: 2
- Parent: Joe Wilson (adoptive father)
- Education: Francis Marion University (BS); University of South Carolina (JD)
- Website: Campaign website

Military service
- Allegiance: United States
- Branch/service: United States Army
- Years of service: 1996–present
- Rank: Colonel
- Unit: South Carolina Army National Guard; United States Army Judge Advocate General's Corps
- Wilson's voice Wilson on fraud enforcement actions in the southeastern United States. Recorded July 30, 2026

Alan McCrory Wilson (born Alan McCrory; July 16, 1973) is an American lawyer, politician, and military officer who is the governor-elect of South Carolina. A member of the Republican Party, he has served as the 51st attorney general of South Carolina since 2011.

The adopted son of U.S. Representative Joe Wilson, he attended Francis Marion University and the University of South Carolina School of Law. He serves as a colonel in the South Carolina National Guard and worked as an attorney in Columbia before being elected attorney general in 2010. As attorney general, Wilson has litigated to block same-sex marriage, invalidate the Affordable Care Act, challenge environmental regulations, defend anti-abortion laws, and prohibit masking and vaccine requirements. He has advocated against cannabis decriminalization and Deferred Action for Childhood Arrivals.

Wilson defeated Lieutenant Governor Pamela Evette in the June 23, 2026 Republican primary runoff, securing the Republican nomination for governor. He subsequently faced Democratic nominee Jermaine Johnson, United Citizens Party nominee Michael Addison and South Carolina Green Party nominee Walid Hakim in the November 3 general election, defeating them to win the governorship. Wilson is expected to assume office on January 13, 2027, succeeding incumbent Governor Henry McMaster.

== Early life and education ==
Wilson was born Alan McCrory on July 16, 1973 in Fort Wolters, Texas. His father, Michael Alan McCrory, was an Army captain and Vietnam veteran who died in a military training exercise at Fort Bragg when Wilson was two years old. His mother, Roxanne Dusenbury McCrory, later married Joe Wilson, who currently serves as the U.S. representative for South Carolina's 2nd congressional district. Joe Wilson adopted Alan when he was three years old, and Alan subsequently took his surname. Along with his three brothers, Alan is an Eagle Scout.

Wilson graduated from Francis Marion University, where he joined Pi Kappa Alpha through the Theta Delta chapter, in 1996 with a Bachelor of Science in political science. He later received a Juris Doctor from the University of South Carolina School of Law in 2002.

Wilson joined the South Carolina National Guard in 1996 after finishing his undergraduate studies. He currently serves as a colonel in the Judge Advocate General Corps.

== Legal career ==
Wilson interned in the South Carolina Attorney General's office under Charlie Condon. After law school, he worked for Judge Marc H. Westbrook of the South Carolina Circuit Court. Wilson later served as an assistant solicitor and as an assistant attorney general in South Carolina. In 2009, he moved to the private sector and started working at the law firm Willoughby & Hoefer in Columbia, South Carolina.

== Political career ==
=== Attorney General of South Carolina ===
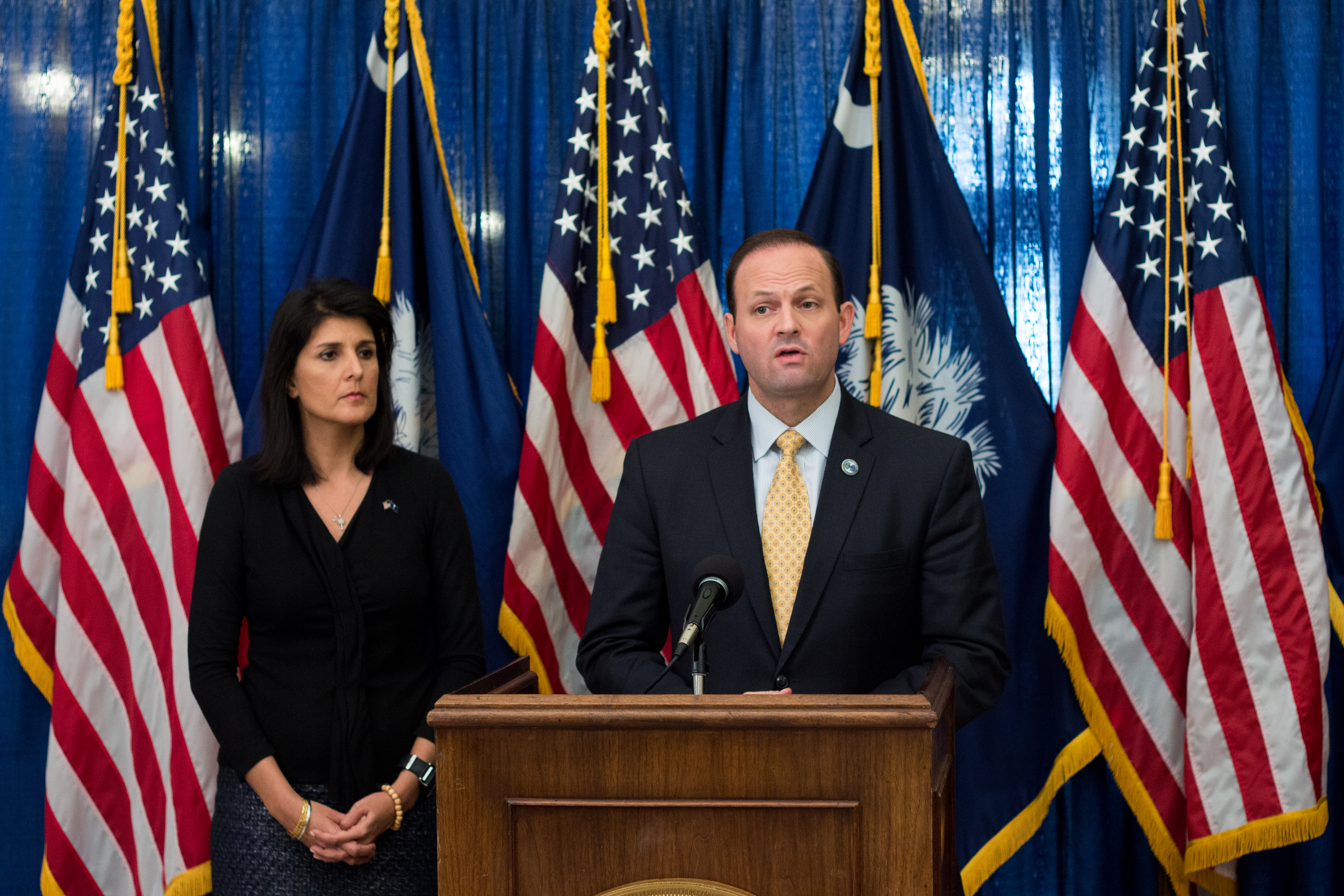
Wilson speaking alongside Governor Nikki Haley

Henry McMaster did not run for re-election as Attorney General, choosing instead to run for governor to succeed term-limited incumbent Mark Sanford. Wilson won the Republican nomination in a runoff election on June 22, 2010, receiving 60 percent of the vote against his opponent Leighton Lord. Wilson defeated Democratic nominee Matthew Richardson in the general election.

Wilson was re-elected in 2014, defeating the Democratic nominee, Parnell Diggs.

Wilson was elected to a third term in 2018. In the contentious Republican primary, Wilson faced two challengers for renomination, state Representative Todd Atwater and attorney William Herlong of Greenville. Both challengers focused on ethics issues, criticizing Wilson for his connections to the Quinns, who reached a plea deal after being embroiled in a Statehouse corruption investigation. In the initial Republican primary, Wilson received 48.6%, Atwater received 29.7%, and Herlong received almost 22%; because no candidate received a majority, the nomination was decided by a primary runoff election. Although Herlong endorsed Atwater in the runoff, Wilson won renomination, receiving about 65% of the vote to Atwater's 35%. In the general election, Wilson received about 55% of the vote, defeating Democratic nominee Constance Anastopoulo. Wilson ranked number 1 on the Post and Courier Columbia's 2025 Power List.

=== 2026 South Carolina gubernatorial campaign ===
On June 23, 2025, Wilson announced his candidacy for governor. He and his running mate, state Senator Mike Reichenbach, received 26% of the vote in the June 9, 2026 Republican primary, placing second to the 29% of Lt. Governor Pamela Evette. U.S. Representatives Nancy Mace and Ralph Norman, who also ran in the primary and finished fifth and third, respectively, subsequently endorsed Wilson, as did Senator Tim Scott. Because no candidate had received a majority of the votes cast in the primary, a runoff was held on June 23, 2026, in which Wilson defeated Evette and claimed the Republican nomination.

Wilson defeated Democratic nominee Jermaine Johnson in the November 3, 2026 general election, winning election as the 58th governor of South Carolina.

Wilson's election continued Republican control of the South Carolina governorship, which the party had held since 2003. He succeeded term-limited Governor Henry McMaster, who had served as governor since 2017. Wilson is expected to assume office on January 13, 2027, alongside his running mate, state Senator Mike Reichenbach

== Political views ==
=== Abortion ===
A staunch opponent of abortion, Wilson defended a state law banning most abortions in South Carolina from a constitutional challenge. In 2021, Wilson joined a U.S. Supreme Court filing calling on the Court to overturn Roe v. Wade.

=== Election integrity ===
==== Election-fraud claims ====
On January 12, 2012, Wilson falsely claimed on Fox News that "We found out that there were over 900 people who died and then subsequently voted. That number could be even higher than that." These claims were untrue, and an exhaustive investigation by the South Carolina Law Enforcement Division found no evidence to support the claims of "zombie voters" in South Carolina.

==== Efforts to challenge 2020 presidential election outcome ====
In December 2020, Wilson joined a lawsuit with 16 other Republican state attorneys general urging the U.S. Supreme Court to overturn the results of the 2020 presidential election, specifically by challenging Joe Biden's victory in four states. The suit did not allege fraud; it questioned voting by mail in the four states and argued that their legislatures had been denied their constitutional role in overseeing it. The next month, in advance of the January 6 attack on the United States Capitol by a pro-Trump mob, the Republican Attorneys General Association, then chaired by Wilson, made robocalls encouraging "patriots" to march on Washington and demand that Congress overturn the election results and keep Trump in power. Wilson later acknowledged Biden as the election's winner on January 11, 2021. He said he was "completely unaware" of the Republican Attorneys General Association robocalls; the group's executive director, a former Wilson aide Adam Piper, resigned.

Five South Carolina attorneys subsequently filed complaints with the South Carolina Office of Disciplinary Counsel against Wilson, alleging that his participation in the Trump conspiracy lawsuit was an abuse of office that attempted to disenfranchise voters and had the effect of inflaming the subsequent protest. Wilson denied wrongdoing.

=== COVID-19 pandemic ===
Wilson was one of 21 Republican state attorneys general who claimed that a portion of President Biden's COVID-19 relief package (specifically, a provision that states could not redirect federal stimulus money to reduce state tax rates) was unconstitutional.

In August 2021, ahead of the start of the 2021–2022 school year and amid an increasing number of COVID-19 cases in the state, Wilson said that the University of South Carolina could not implement indoor mask requirements for campus access. Wilson contended that a proviso (a type of state budget measure) passed by the General Assembly earlier that year prohibited such a mandate. After Wilson's intervention, the university dropped the requirement. However, later the same month, the South Carolina Supreme Court issued a unanimous decision that rejected Wilson's interpretation, and the University of South Carolina reinstated its mask mandate.

Wilson challenged the Joe Biden administration's vaccine requirement for large businesses.

=== Drug policy ===
In January 2019, Wilson described cannabis as "the most dangerous drug, because it is the most misunderstood drug" in the United States while denouncing legislation that would allow physicians to prescribe medical marijuana for patients. Wilson was one of 16 state attorneys general who did not support the SAFE Banking Act, which permitted the use of the banking system by cannabis-related businesses in states and territories in which cannabis is legal.

Wilson is the respondent of an ongoing lawsuit which alleges that Wilson and South Carolina Law Enforcement Division (SLED) denied a farmer due process when they destroyed his hemp farm.

=== Environmental policy ===
In 2021, Wilson joined a Republican lawsuit challenging President Biden's order directing federal agencies to consider the costs of greenhouse gas pollution in making decisions. Wilson also joined another lawsuit challenging Biden's decision to revoke the federal permit for the Keystone XL Pipeline, an oil pipeline project 1,000 miles from South Carolina.

=== Healthcare ===
Wilson supported lawsuits to overturn the Affordable Care Act.

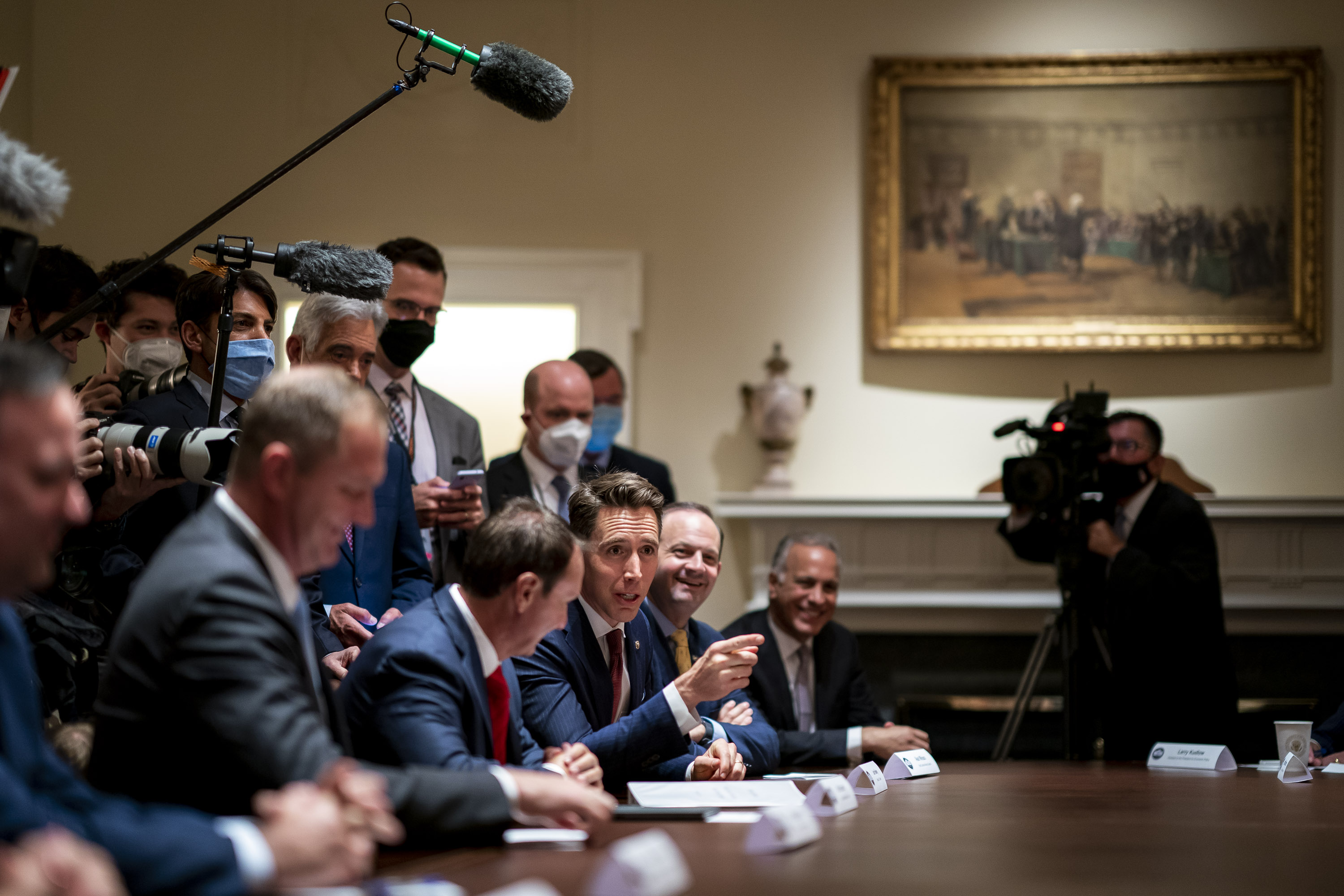
Wilson (second from the right) with other Attorney Generals at a White House Meeting on Protecting Consumers from Social Media Abuse, 2020

=== Immigration ===
In July 2017, Texas Attorney General Ken Paxton led a group of Republican attorneys general from nine other states, including Wilson, plus Idaho Governor Butch Otter, in threatening that they would litigate against the Deferred Action for Childhood Arrivals (DACA) policy that had been put into place by President Barack Obama.

=== Same-sex marriage ===
In 2014, Wilson asked the South Carolina Supreme Court to block the issuance of marriage licenses to same-sex couples in the state. Wilson waged an exhaustive legal fight to block same-sex marriage in South Carolina, and in 2015, U.S. District Judge Richard Gergel ordered Wilson to pay more than $134,000 in attorneys' fees to plaintiffs who successfully challenged the state's ban on same-sex marriage.

== Controversies ==
=== Investigation of campaign contributions ===
In 2013, Wilson self-reported his campaign failed to report at least 84 contributions and expenditures on required public reports. In February 2013, Wilson originally admitted his campaign failed to disclose and report receiving at least 15 separate contributions of unknown amounts. A further investigation in March 2013 revealed at least 68 unreported contributions and 16 unreported expenditures. As the errors were self-reported and the reports were subsequently re-filed, Wilson faced no penalties.

=== Corruption investigation ===
In late 2013, a State Law Enforcement Division report focusing on former state House Speaker Bobby Harrell was transferred to the attorney general's office. The report mentioned state representatives Rick Quinn Sr. and Rick Quinn Jr. suggesting misconduct by the younger Quinn. In early 2014, Wilson recused himself from the investigation and appointed David Pascoe, the solicitor for the 1st Judicial Circuit, as special prosecutor. Harrell pleaded guilty and resigned from the House in late 2014. Pascoe urged the attorney general's office to investigate the Quinns. After Harrell pleaded guilty to misusing campaign money and resigned from the House in late 2014, Pascoe emailed the attorney general's office, urging the Quinns be investigated. Wilson secretly recruited Quinn to assist in drafting a response letter to Pascoe, saying that his role as a special prosecutor was complete; Wilson later said that this was a mistake.

In March 2016, after Pascoe continued to use the state grand jury to investigate possible corruption in the General Assembly, Wilson attempted to fire Pascoe, triggering a political firestorm in the state. Adam Piper, a Wilson aide, launched a secret effort to smear Pascoe. Pascoe challenged Wilson's attempt to fire him, arguing that the attorney general could not do so after previously recusing himself on the grounds of a conflict of interest. In July 2016, the South Carolina Supreme Court sided with Pascoe on a 4–1 decision, rejecting Wilson's attempt to fire him as special prosecutor. Ultimately, the younger Rick Quinn resigned from office and pleaded guilty to a reduced charge, while the elder Quinn agreed to testify before the state grand jury, and his consulting firm pleaded guilty to failing to register as a lobbyist.

In October 2018, after a two-year investigation, a state grand jury issued a 270-page report on corruption in South Carolina, including blurred relationships between businesses, legislators, lobbyists, and political consultants. The grand jury determined that Wilson's failure to act following the guilty plea of Harrell and the Quinns impeded an investigation into state government corruption, although it made no finding as to Wilson's intent. The investigation and the report focused in part on Wilson's close ties to Richard Quinn, a prominent Republican political strategist in the state, and his son Rick Quinn Jr., who had been a member of the state House. Wilson had paid the elder Quinn's firm more than $220,000 for political strategy services in two election campaigns. Wilson denied wrongdoing and asserted that the 2018 grand jury's report was politically motivated. Judge Clifton Newman ordered that the report be released to the public.

== Personal life ==
Wilson and his wife, Jennifer (née Miskewicz), a former WIS-TV news reporter, have two children. Wilson joined the South Carolina National Guard in 1996 and received the Combat Action Badge for service in Iraq. Wilson's brother, Julian Wilson, is co-owner of the gun manufacturer and retailer Palmetto State Armory.

== Electoral history ==
2010 South Carolina Attorney General Republican primary
Party	Candidate	Votes	%
Republican	Alan Wilson	150,404	38.9%
Republican	Leighton Lord	143,339	37.1%
Republican	Robert Bolchoz	92,457	23.9%
Total votes		386,200	100.0%

2010 South Carolina Attorney General Republican primary runoff
Party	Candidate	Votes	%
Republican	Alan Wilson	205,851	59.8%
Republican	Leighton Lord	138,444	40.2%
Total votes		344,295	100.0%

2010 South Carolina Attorney General election
Party	Candidate	Votes	%
Republican	Alan Wilson	716,193	53.7%
Democratic	Matthew Richardson	589,135	44.2%
Green	Leslie Minerd	27,008	2.0%
Write-in		470	0.04%
Total votes		1,332,806	100.0%

2014 South Carolina Attorney General election
Party	Candidate	Votes	%
Republican	Alan Wilson (incumbent)	738,434	60.3%
Democratic	Parnell Diggs	486,058	39.7%
Write-in		879	0.07%
Total votes		1,225,371	100.0%

2018 South Carolina Attorney General Republican primary
Party	Candidate	Votes	%
Republican	Alan Wilson (incumbent)	166,860	48.6%
Republican	Todd Atwater	102,038	29.7%
Republican	William D. Herlong	74,199	21.6%
Total votes		343,097	100.0%

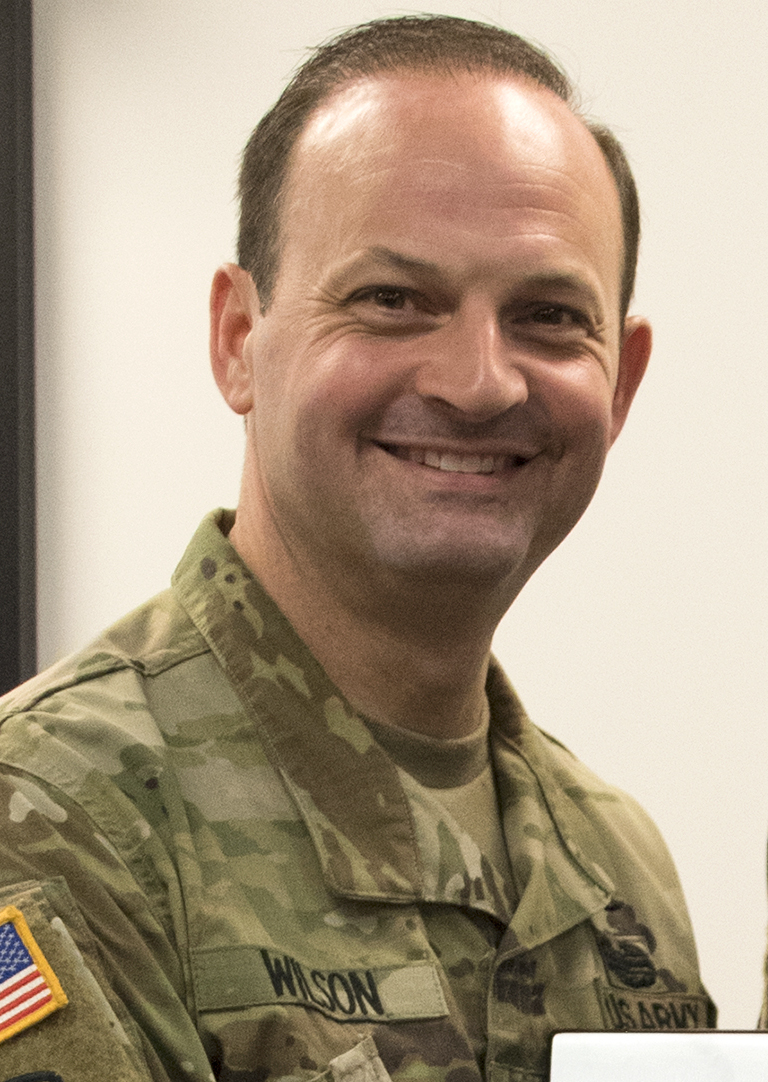
Wilson in 2017.

2018 South Carolina Attorney General Republican primary runoff
Party	Candidate	Votes	%
Republican	Alan Wilson (incumbent)	213,538	65.0%
Republican	Todd Atwater	115,133	35.0%
Total votes		328,671	100.0%

2018 South Carolina Attorney General election
Party	Candidate	Votes	%
Republican	Alan Wilson (incumbent)	938,032	55.1%
Democratic	Constance Anastopoulo	729,694	42.8%
Working Families	Constance Anastopoulo	35,112	2.1%
Write-in		996	0.06%
Total votes		1,703,834	100.0%

2022 South Carolina Attorney General Republican primary
Party	Candidate	Votes	%
Republican	Alan Wilson (incumbent)	228,538	65.7%
Republican	Lauren Martel	119,247	34.3%
Total votes		347,785	100.0%

2022 South Carolina Attorney General election
Party	Candidate	Votes	%
Republican	Alan Wilson (incumbent)	1,223,080	97.3%
Write-in		33,709	2.7%
Total votes		1,256,789	100.0%

2026 South Carolina Governor Republican primary
Party	Candidate	Votes	%
Republican	Pamela Evette	136,480	28.9%
Republican	Alan Wilson	123,643	26.1%
Republican	Ralph Norman	80,790	17.1%
Republican	Rom Reddy	66,992	14.2%
Republican	Nancy Mace	57,380	12.1%
Republican	Josh Kimbrell	3,957	0.84%
Republican	Jacqueline Hicks DuBose - *Decertified before Primary*	3,714	0.79%
Total votes		472,956	100.0%

2026 South Carolina Governor Republican primary runoff
Party	Candidate	Votes	%
Republican	Alan Wilson	218,569	68.6%
Republican	Pamela Evette	100,227	31.4%
Total votes		318,796	100.0%

Party political offices
Preceded by Henry McMaster	Republican nominee for Attorney General of South Carolina; 2010, 2014, 2018, 2022	Succeeded by David Stumbo
Preceded by Henry McMaster	Republican nominee for Governor of South Carolina; 2026	Most recent
Legal offices
Preceded by Henry McMaster	Attorney General of South Carolina; 2011–present	Incumbent
Political offices
Preceded by Henry McMaster	Governor of South Carolina; Taking office 2027	Elect
