= James Conner (general) =

American politician and Confederate general

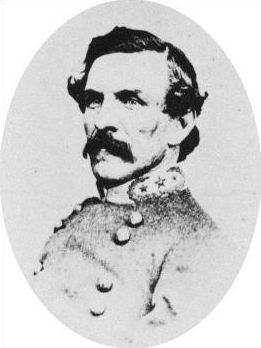
- Born: September 1, 1829; Charleston, South Carolina
- Died: June 26, 1883 (aged 53); Richmond, Virginia
- Burial place: Magnolia Cemetery (Charleston, South Carolina)
- Military career
- Allegiance: Confederate States of America
- Branch: Confederate States Army
- Service years: 1861–1865 (CSA)
- Rank: Brigadier General (CSA)
- Units: 22nd North Carolina Infantry Regiment; Brigade, Army of Northern Virginia
- Conflicts: American Civil War: Battle of First Manassas; Battle of Seven Pines; Seven Days Battles; Battle of Chancellorsville; Battle of Gettysburg; Siege of Petersburg; Valley Campaigns of 1864; Skirmish at Cedar Creek (Fisher's Hill)
- Other work: Lawyer, Attorney General of South Carolina

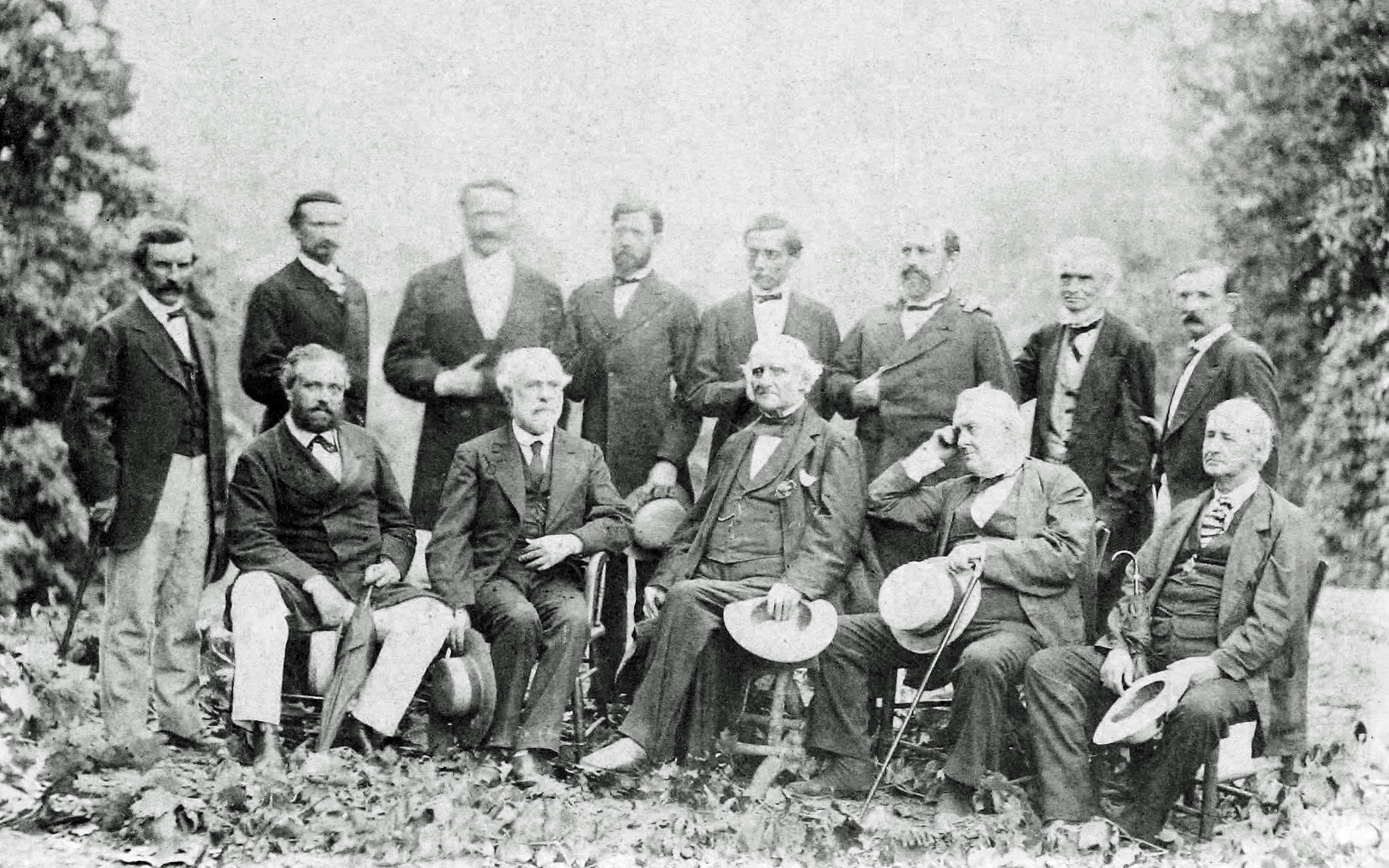
James Conner (top left) with Robert E. Lee and other Union and Confederate officers, White Sulphur Springs, West Virginia, 1869

James Conner (September 1, 1829 – June 26, 1883), was a Confederate States Army brigadier-general during the American Civil War. He was a lawyer in South Carolina both before and after the war and was elected Attorney General of South Carolina in 1876.

== Early life ==
James Conner was born on September 1, 1829, in Charleston, South Carolina. Conner was Presbyterian and remarked that he identified with "Ulster" which was an archaic name for what is today known as Northern Ireland. Conner was born in Charleston, as were both of his parents, all four of his grandparents were Presbyterians of Scottish descent from Ballymena, Ireland in what is today Northern Ireland. After graduating from that state's College in 1849, he studied law and practiced it in Charleston. In 1856, he was appointed United States Attorney for the District of South Carolina and served in this office until 1860. Conner authored The History of a Suit at Law (1857). He prosecuted the famous case against the slave ship Echo. He also prosecuted a member of William Walker's filibustering effort. Conner was a secessionist and supported the calling of a secessionist convention. Although he was a member of the convention, he did not vote on the ordinance of secession.

== American Civil War ==
James Conner participated in the bombardment of Fort Sumter as a captain of the Montgomery Guards, a South Carolina militia unit. At the beginning of the Civil War, he declined an appointment as a district attorney for the Confederacy. Instead, he became a captain in the Hampton Legion and fought at the Battle of First Bull Run (First Manassas), taking temporary command of the legion after Colonel Wade Hampton was wounded. On July 21, 1861, Conner was appointed major of Hampton's Legion. After the Battle of Seven Pines during the Peninsula Campaign, he took command of the 22nd North Carolina Volunteer Infantry Regiment. During the Seven Days Battles, his leg was broken by a rifle ball during the Battle of Gaines Mill. After a two-month recovery period, he returned to lead his regiment at the Battle of Chancellorsville and the Battle of Gettysburg.

He resigned his command on August 13, 1863, and became a member of the military court of the 2nd Corps, Army of Northern Virginia. Returning to field command in 1864, Conner was promoted to brigadier-general on June 1, 1864. He temporarily commanded the brigades of Brigadier Generals Samuel McGowan and James H. Lane consecutively during the opening months of the Siege of Petersburg. He then led Major-General John B. Kershaw's former brigade during the Shenandoah Valley Campaigns of 1864. Six days before the main battle, Conner was severely wounded during a skirmish at Cedar Creek (Fisher's Hill), and he lost a leg to amputation. This effectively ended his Confederate States Army field service, although his service record shows an assignment to General Joseph E. Johnston's command on February 25, 1865. There is no record of his parole.

== Aftermath ==
After the Civil War, James Conner returned to his law practice in Charleston. A member and Past Master of Landmark Lodge No. 76, A.F.M., he served as Grand Master of Masons in South Carolina from 1868 to 1870. In 1876, he was elected attorney general of South Carolina. In that office, he was able to obtain judicial confirmation of the election of former Confederate Major-General Wade Hampton as governor of the state.

James Conner died in Richmond, Virginia, on June 26, 1883. He is buried in Magnolia Cemetery (Charleston, South Carolina). The Letters of General James Conner, C.S.A. was published posthumously in 1933.

== See also ==
- List of American Civil War generals (Confederate)
