= South Carolina Attorney General =

Elected official in the United States

Attorney General of South Carolina
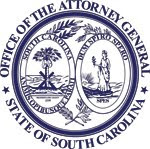

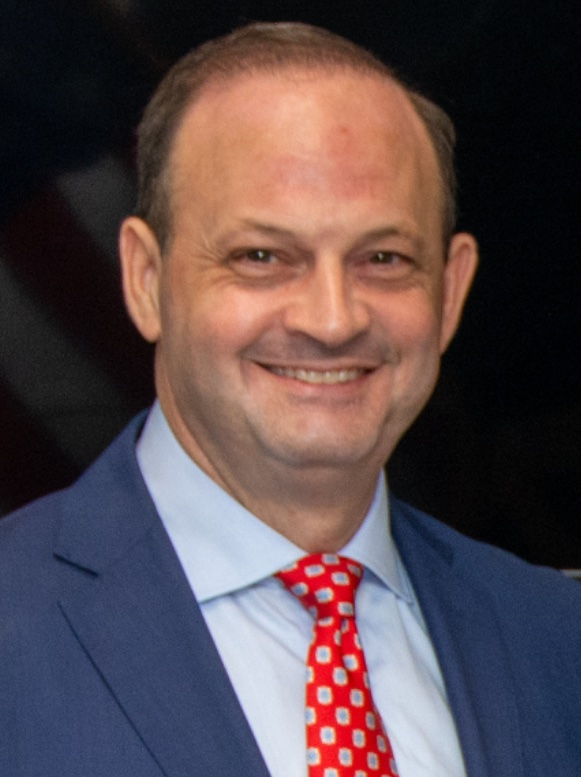
- Incumbent; Alan Wilson since January 12, 2011
- Style: The Honorable
- Type: Chief law enforcement officer
- Term length: Four years, no limit
- Constituting instrument: Constitution of South Carolina
- First holder: Nicholas Trott
- Salary: $208,000
- Website: www.scag.gov

The attorney general of South Carolina is a statewide elected attorney and South Carolina's chief legal officer and prosecutor. They are a constitutional officer responsible for providing legal opinions to the legislative and executive branch, represent state officers in civil suits, and appear on behalf of the State in all cases before the Supreme Court of the United States and all appellate courts.

== History ==
On February 5, 1698, Nicholas Trott was appointed as the first attorney general of South Carolina during its time as a British colony. He arrived in Charleston and assumed his duties the following year. Alexander Moultrie, half-brother of Revolutionary War figure and future governor William Moultrie, was named the state's first attorney general under its first state "president", John Rutledge, in 1776. Rutledge had been provincial attorney general himself for 10 months before independence. Moultrie was impeached and resigned in 1792 for diverting state funds into the Yazoo land company fraud.

After the 1876 South Carolina gubernatorial election, the state was left with a contested election and a dual government, from the election in November through April 1877. Republican Robert B. Elliott served briefly in this situation under Republican governor Daniel Henry Chamberlain, while James Conner held office under fellow Confederate officer and Democrat Wade Hampton III. Hampton and Conner prevailed.

== His Majesty's attorneys-general of South Carolina ==
The colonial province of South Carolina was first organized under a royal governor in 1720.

- Benjamin Whitaker (1721–1731)
- James Abercrombie (1731–1732)
- Charles Pinckney (1732–1733)
- James Abercrombie (1733–1742)
- Sir James Wright (1742–1757)
- David Graeme (1757–1764)
- James Moultrie (1764)
- John Rutledge (1764)
- Sir Egerton Leigh, 1st Baronet (1765–1774)
- James Simpson (1774–1775)

== U.S. state of South Carolina attorneys general ==
| Image | Name | Took office | Left office | Party |
|---|---|---|---|---|
| | Alexander Moultrie | 1776 | 1792 | |
| | John Julius Pringle | 1792 | 1808 | |
| | Langdon Cheves | December 8, 1808 | December 4, 1810 | Democratic-Republican |
| | John Smythe Richardson (Sr.) | 1810 | 1818 | |
| | Robert Y. Hayne | December 18, 1818 | December 7, 1822 | Democratic-Republican |
| | James L. Petigru | 1822 | 1830 | Whig |
| | Hugh S. Legaré | November 27, 1830 | November 29, 1832 | Democratic |
| | Robert Rhett | November 29, 1832 | March 4, 1837 | Democratic |
| | Henry Bailey | 1837 | 1848 | |
| | Isaac W. Hayne | 1848 | 1868 | |
| | Daniel Henry Chamberlain | July 6, 1868 | December 7, 1872 | Republican |
| | Samuel Wickliff Melton | 1872 | 1876 | Republican |
| | William Stone | 1876 | 1876 | Republican |
| | Robert B. Elliott (disputed) | December 14, 1876 | May 29, 1877 | Republican |
| | James Conner (disputed) | 1876 | 1877 | Democratic |
| | LeRoy F. Youmans | 1877 | 1882 | Democratic |
| | Charles R. Miles | 1882 | 1886 | |
| | Joseph H. Earle | November 30, 1886 | December 4, 1890 | Democratic |
| | Young J. Pope | 1890 | 1891 | |
| | John L. McLaurin | December 10, 1891 | December 5, 1892 | Democratic |
| | Daniel A. Townsend | 1892 | 1894 | |
| | William A. Barber | 1894 | 1898 | |
| | G. Duncan Bellinger (Sr.) | 1898 | 1902 | |
| | U. X. Gunter, Jr. | 1902 | 1905 | Democratic |
| | LeRoy F. Youmans | 1905 | 1906 | Democratic |
| | D.C. Ray | 1906 | 1907 | |
| | J. Fraser Lyon | 1907 | 1912 | |
| | Thomas H. Peeples | 1913 | 1918 | Democratic |
| | Samuel M. Wolfe | 1918 | 1924 | |
| | John M. Daniel | 1924 | 1950 | Democratic |
| | Tolliver Cleveland Callison Sr. | 1951 | 1959 | Democratic |
| | Daniel R. McLeod | 1959 | 1983 | Democratic |
| | Thomas T. Medlock | January 3, 1983 | January 3, 1995 | Democratic |
| | Charlie Condon | January 15, 1995 | January 15, 2003 | Republican |
| | Henry McMaster | January 15, 2003 | January 12, 2011 | Republican |
| | Alan Wilson | January 12, 2011 | present | Republican |
