= 2024 United States House of Representatives elections in South Carolina =

- November 5, 2024

All 7 South Carolina seats to the United States House of Representatives
	Majority party	Minority party
Party	Republican	Democratic
Last election	6	1
Seats won	6	1
Seat change	Steady	Steady
Popular vote	1,470,674	960,885
Percentage	60.48%	39.51%
Swing	▼5.43%	▲7.24%

Republican
50–60%
60–70%
70–80%
Democratic
50–60%
60–70%

The 2024 United States House of Representatives elections in South Carolina was held on November 5, 2024, to elect the seven U.S. representatives from the State of South Carolina, one from each of the state's congressional districts. The elections coincided with the 2024 U.S. presidential election, as well as other elections to the House of Representatives, elections to the United States Senate, and various state and local elections. The primary elections occurred on June 11, 2024.

== District 1 ==
2024 South Carolina's 1st congressional district election
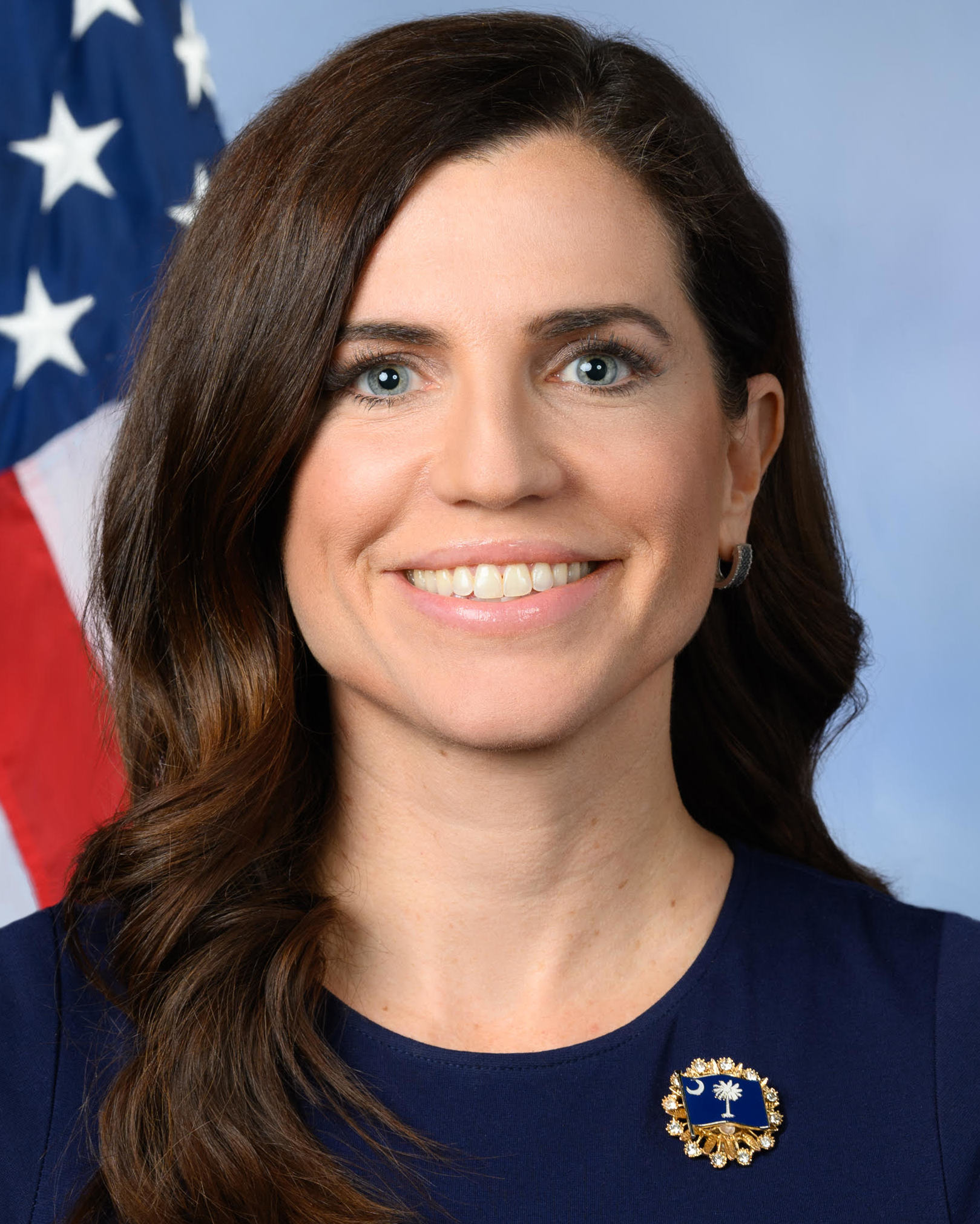

Nominee	Nancy Mace	Michael B. Moore
Party	Republican	Democratic
Popular vote	227,502	162,582
Percentage	58.2%	41.6%
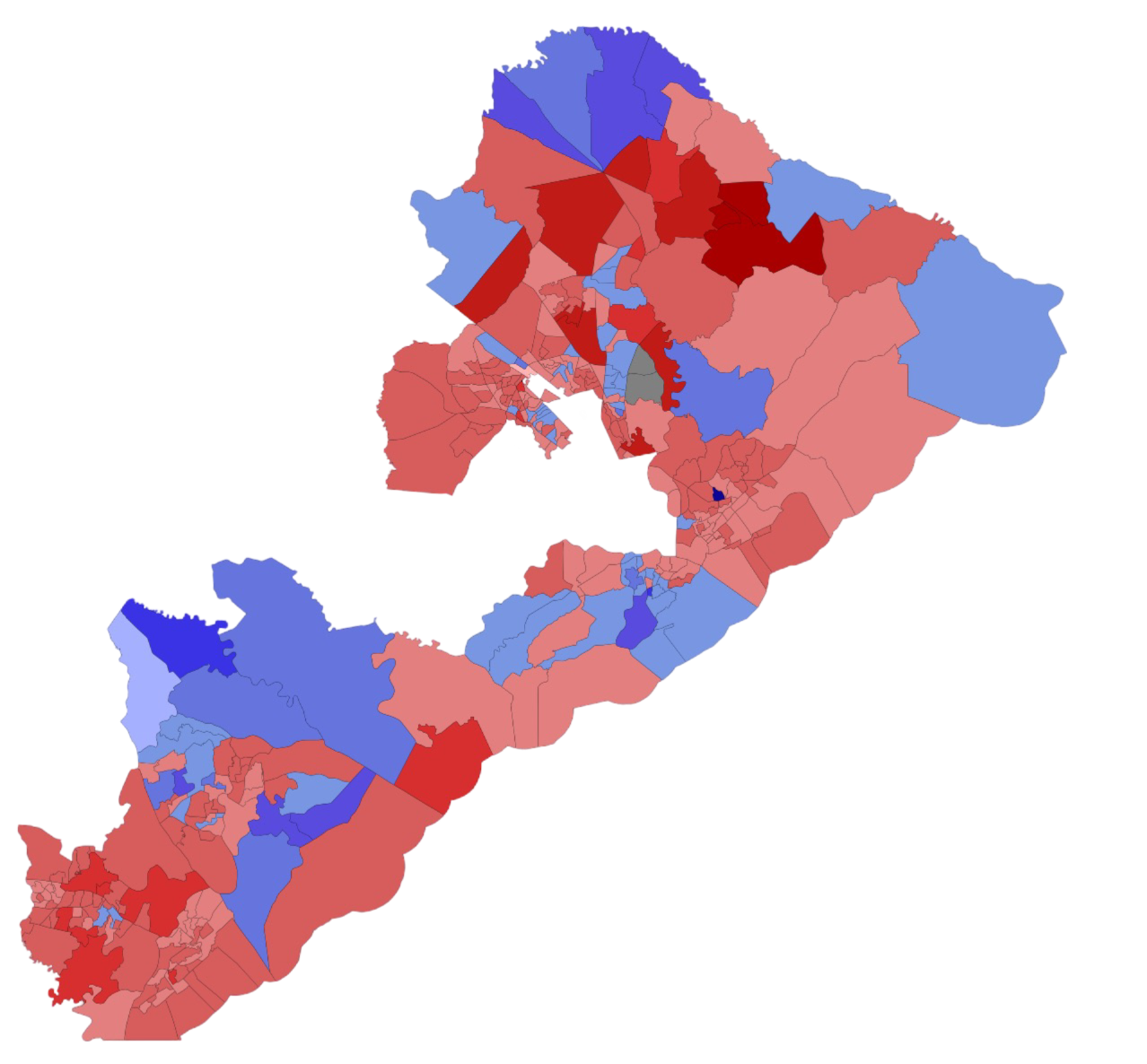
- Mace: 40–50% 50–60% 60–70% 70–80% 80–90% >90% Moore: 40–50% 50–60% 60–70% 70–80% 80–90% >90% No data
U.S. Representative before election
Nancy Mace
Republican
Elected U.S. Representative
Nancy Mace
Republican

The 1st district straddles the Atlantic coast of the state and includes most of Charleston. The incumbent is Republican Nancy Mace, who was re-elected with 56.49% of the vote in 2022.

=== Republican primary ===
==== Nominee ====
- Nancy Mace, incumbent U.S. Representative

==== Eliminated in primary ====
- Catherine Templeton, former director of the South Carolina Department of Health and Environmental Control and candidate for governor in 2018
- Bill Young, nonprofit executive

==== Declined ====
- Katie Arrington, former Chief Information Security Officer for the Under Secretary of Defense, former state representative from the 94th district, nominee for this district in 2018 and candidate in 2022 (endorsed Templeton)
- Dan Hanlon, former chief of staff to incumbent Nancy Mace
- Jenny Costa Honeycutt, Charleston County councilor

==== Endorsements ====
Nancy Mace

Executive branch officials

- Donald Trump, former President of the United States (2017–2021)

U.S. representatives

- Matt Gaetz, from Florida's 1st congressional district (2017−present)
- Mike Johnson, Speaker of the U.S. House (2023−present) from Louisiana's 4th congressional district (2017−present)

Statewide elected officials

- Henry McMaster, South Carolina Governor (2017−present)

Organizations

- AIPAC
- Club for Growth
- Humane Society Legislative Fund
- Log Cabin Republicans PAC
Catherine Templeton

U.S. representatives

- Newt Gingrich, former Speaker of the U.S. House (1995−1999) from Georgia's 6th congressional district (1979−1999)
- Kevin McCarthy, former U.S. representative from California's 20th congressional district (2007–2023) and former Speaker of the House (2023)
- Joe Wilson, U.S. Representative from South Carolina's 2nd congressional district (2001–present)

Federal officials

- Katie Arrington, former Chief Information Security Officer for the Under Secretary of Defense and former state representative from the 94th district
- Ed McMullen, former U.S. Ambassador to Switzerland

==== Fundraising ====
Campaign finance reports as of May 22, 2024
Candidate	Raised	Spent	Cash on hand
Nancy Mace (R)	$2,255,001	$1,663,437	$802,525
Catherine Templeton (R)	$663,065	$407,103	$255,961
Bill Young (R)	$20,396	$11,837	$8,558
Source: Federal Election Commission

=== Polling ===
Poll source	Date(s) administered	Sample size (Note: Key: A – all adults RV – registered voters LV – likely voters V – unclear)	Margin of error	Nancy Mace	Catherine Templeton	Bill Young	Other	Undecided
Emerson College	May 19–21, 2024	400 (LV)	± 4.9%	47%	22%	7%	–	24%
Kaplan Strategies	May 6–7, 2024	343 (LV)	± 5.3%	43%	21%	3%	–	33%

==== Results ====
2024 GOP primary results by county: Mace: 50–60%; 60–70%; 70–80%

2024 GOP primary results by precinct: Mace: 40–50%; 50–60%; 60–70%; 70–80%; Templeton: 30–40%; 40–50%; 50–60%; 60–70%; No data

Republican primary results
Party	Candidate	Votes	%
Republican	Nancy Mace (incumbent)	28,300	56.8
Republican	Catherine Templeton	14,849	29.8
Republican	Bill Young	6,691	13.4
Total votes		49,840	100.0

=== Democratic primary ===
==== Nominee ====
- Michael B. Moore, corporate diversity officer and former CEO of the International African American Museum

==== Eliminated in primary ====
- Mac Deford, Hilton Head Island General Counsel

==== Withdrew ====
- Ben Frasier, former aide to U.S. Representative Mendel Rivers, perennial candidate, and nominee for this district in 2010

==== Endorsements ====
Mac Deford

Organizations

- Vote Common Good (co-endorsement with Moore)
Michael B. Moore

State legislators

- Marlon Kimpson, state senator from the 42nd district (2013–2023)

Organizations

- Vote Common Good (co-endorsement with Deford)

Labor unions

- Retail, Wholesale and Department Store Union

==== Fundraising ====
Campaign finance reports as of May 22, 2024
Candidate	Raised	Spent	Cash on hand
Mac Deford (D)	$384,710 (Note: $25,200 of this total was self-funded by Deford)	$294,983	$89,726
Michael Moore (D)	$655,451 (Note: $65,500 of this total was self-funded by Moore)	$561,552	$93,898
Source: Federal Election Commission

==== Results ====
Democratic primary results
Party	Candidate	Votes	%
Democratic	Michael B. Moore	10,893	51.6
Democratic	Mac Deford	10,209	48.4
Total votes		21,102	100.0

=== General election ===
==== Predictions ====
Source	Ranking	As of
The Cook Political Report	Solid R	May 24, 2024
Inside Elections	Solid R	June 20, 2024
Sabato's Crystal Ball	Safe R	February 23, 2023
Elections Daily	Safe R	September 7, 2023
CNalysis	Very Likely R	November 16, 2023

==== Results ====
2024 South Carolina's 1st congressional district election
Party	Candidate	Votes	%
Republican	Nancy Mace (incumbent)	227,502	58.2
Democratic	Michael B. Moore	162,582	41.6
Write-in		693	0.2
Total votes		390,777	100.0
Republican hold			

== District 2 ==
2024 South Carolina's 2nd congressional district election
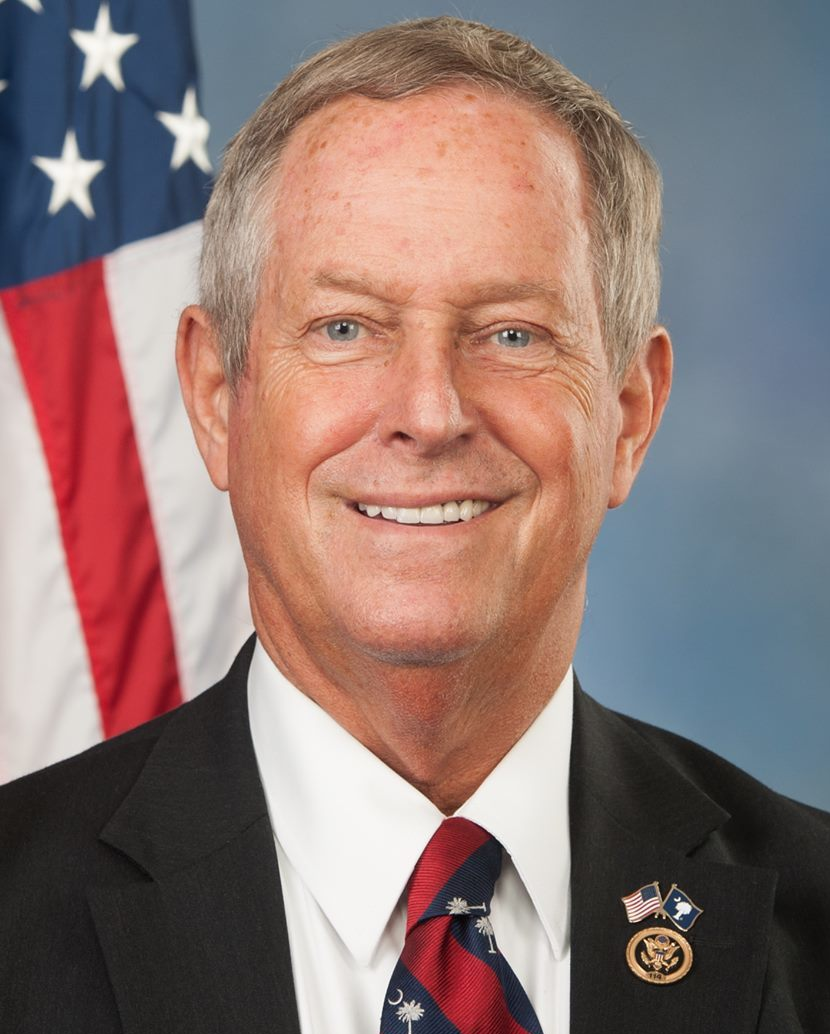

Nominee	Joe Wilson	David Robinson
Party	Republican	Democratic
Popular vote	211,514	142,985
Percentage	59.5%	40.3%
- Wilson: 40–50% 50–60% 60–70% 70–80% 80–90% >90% Robinson: 50–60% 60–70% 70–80% 80–90% No data
U.S. Representative before election
Joe Wilson
Republican
Elected U.S. Representative
Joe Wilson
Republican

The incumbent is Republican Joe Wilson, who was re-elected with 60.09% of the vote in 2022.

=== Republican primary ===
==== Nominee ====
- Joe Wilson, incumbent U.S. representative

==== Eliminated in primary ====
- Hamp Redmond, building contractor

==== Endorsements ====
Joe Wilson

Organizations

- AIPAC
- Pro-Israel America

==== Fundraising ====
Campaign finance reports as of May 22, 2024
Candidate	Raised	Spent	Cash on hand
Joe Wilson (R)	$632,625	$555,518	$341,602
Source: Federal Election Commission

==== Results ====
Republican primary results
Party	Candidate	Votes	%
Republican	Joe Wilson (incumbent)	34,292	73.9
Republican	Hamp Redmond	12,085	26.1
Total votes		46,377	100.0

=== Democratic primary ===
==== Nominee ====
- David Robinson, engineer and father of Daniel Robinson

==== Eliminated in primary ====
- Daniel Shrief, insurance professional

==== Fundraising ====
Campaign finance reports as of May 22, 2024
Candidate	Raised	Spent	Cash on hand
David Robinson (D)	$2,998	$1,000	$1,998
Source: Federal Election Commission

==== Results ====
Democratic primary results
Party	Candidate	Votes	%
Democratic	David Robinson	16,299	84.1
Democratic	Daniel Shrief	3,093	15.9
Total votes		19,392	100.0

=== General election ===
==== Predictions ====
Source	Ranking	As of
The Cook Political Report	Solid R	February 2, 2023
Inside Elections	Solid R	March 10, 2023
Sabato's Crystal Ball	Safe R	February 23, 2023
Elections Daily	Safe R	September 7, 2023
CNalysis	Solid R	November 16, 2023

==== Results ====
2024 South Carolina's 2nd congressional district election
Party	Candidate	Votes	%
Republican	Joe Wilson (incumbent)	211,514	59.5
Democratic	David Robinson	142,985	40.3
Write-in		786	0.2
Total votes		355,285	100.0
Republican hold			

== District 3 ==
2024 South Carolina's 3rd congressional district election
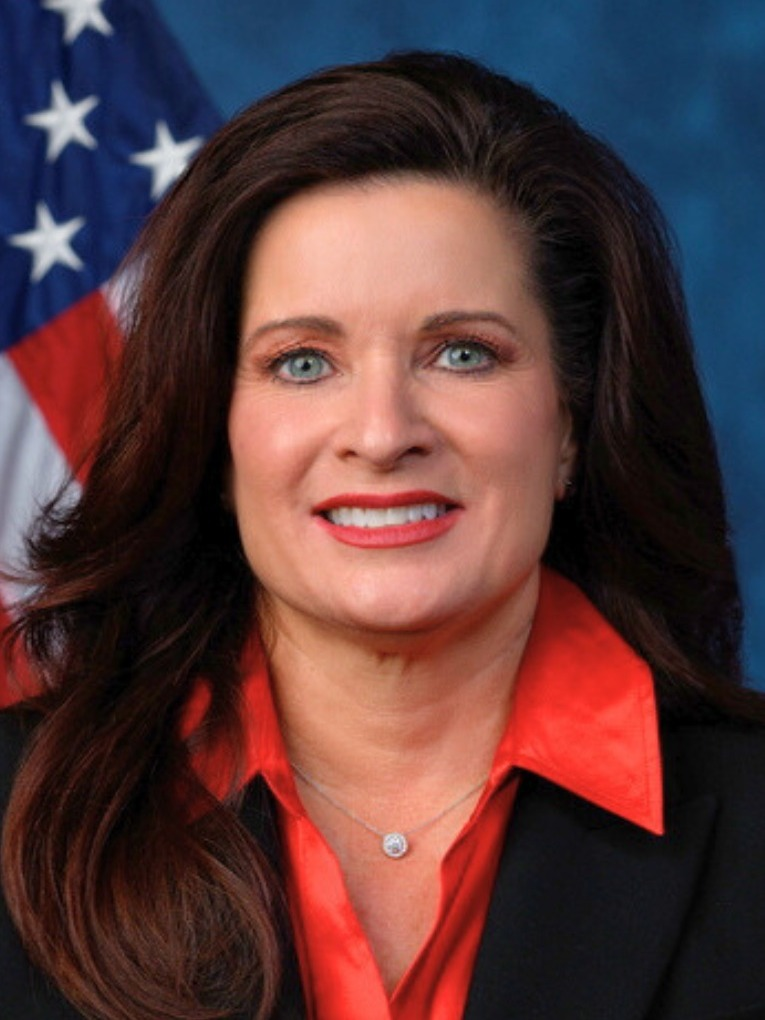

Nominee	Sheri Biggs	Bryon Best
Party	Republican	Democratic
Popular vote	248,451	87,735
Percentage	71.7%	25.3%
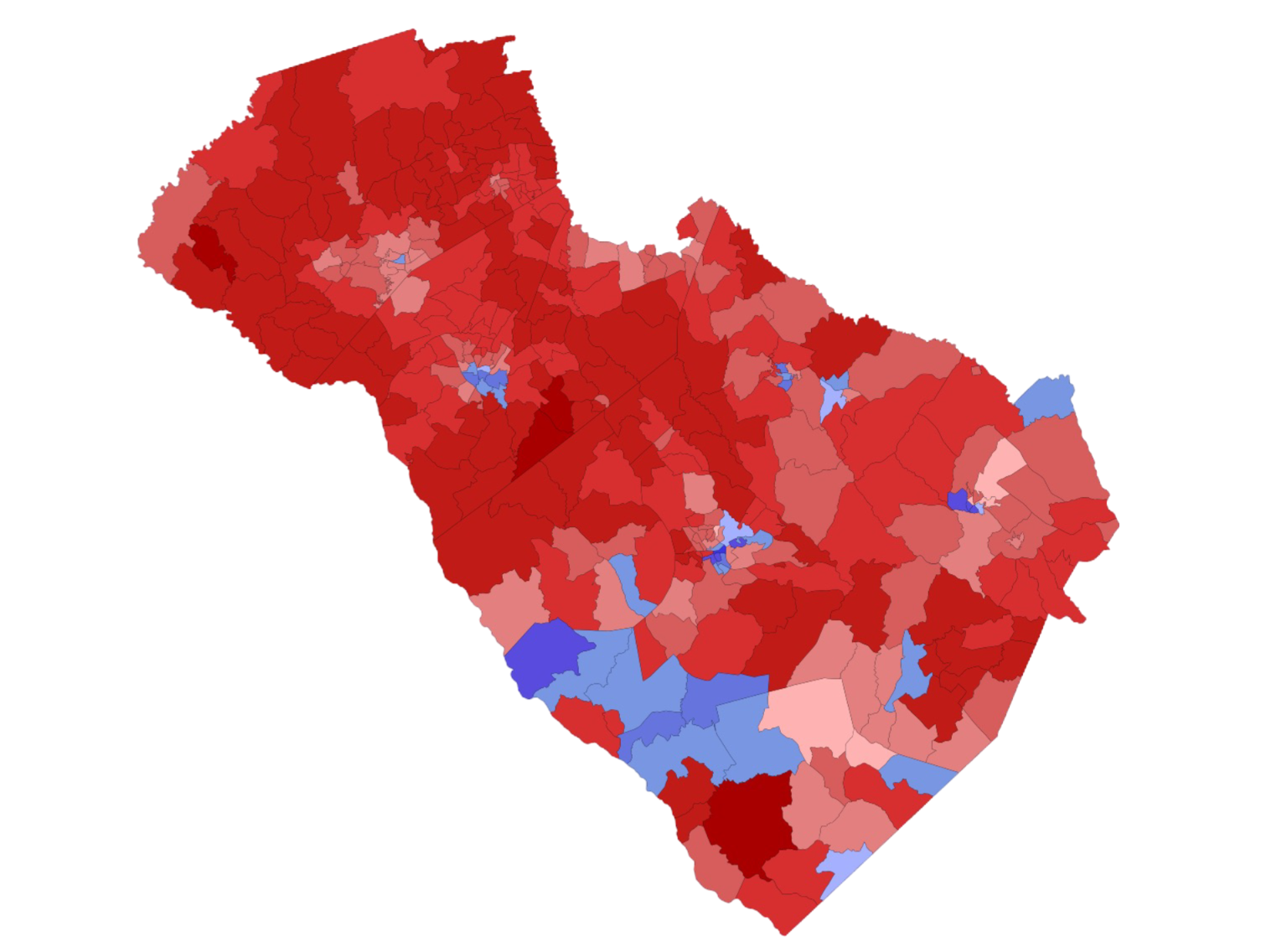
- Biggs: 40–50% 50–60% 60–70% 70–80% 80–90% >90% Best: 40–50% 50–60% 60–70% 70–80% 80–90%
U.S. Representative before election
Jeff Duncan
Republican
Elected U.S. Representative
Sheri Biggs
Republican

The incumbent is Republican Jeff Duncan, who was re-elected unopposed in 2022. Duncan is not seeking reelection.

=== Republican primary ===
==== Nominee ====
- Sheri Biggs, nurse practitioner

==== Eliminated in runoff ====
- Mark Burns, televangelist and candidate for the 4th district in 2018 and 2022

==== Eliminated in primary ====
- Kevin Bishop, former communications director for U.S. Senator Lindsey Graham
- Franky Franco, tech sales executive
- Philip Healy, realtor
- Stewart Jones, state representative from the 14th district (2019–present) (endorsed Burns in runoff)
- Elspeth Murday, bioinformatics researcher

==== Declined ====
- Richard Cash, state senator from the 3rd district (2017–present) and candidate for this district in 2010 (endorsed Jones)
- Jeff Duncan, incumbent U.S. Representative

==== Endorsements ====
Sheri Biggs

Statewide officials

- Henry McMaster, Governor of South Carolina (2017–present)

Executive branch officials

- Donald Trump, 45th president of the United States (2017–2021)

Organizations

- AIPAC
- National Right to Life Committee
Mark Burns

Executive branch officials

- Donald Trump, 45th president of the United States (2017–2021)
Stewart Jones

State legislators

- Richard Cash, state senator from the 3rd district (2017–present)

Organizations

- House Freedom Fund

==== Fundraising ====
Campaign finance reports as of May 22, 2024
Candidate	Raised	Spent	Cash on hand
Sherri Biggs (R)	$528,080 (Note: $315,000 of this total was self-funded by Biggs)	$410,909	$117,171
Kevin Bishop (R)	$181,112 (Note: $50,000 of this total was self-funded by Bishop)	$55,445	$125,667
Mark Burns (R)	$515,737 (Note: $500,000 of this total was self-funded by Burns)	$406,083	$110,999
Franky Franco (R)	$111,708 (Note: $75,000 of this total was self-funded by Franco)	$93,460	$18,247
Philip Healy (R)	$18,183	$18,127	$55
Stewart Jones (R)	$217,142 (Note: $20,000 of this total was self-funded by Jones)	$144,673	$72,469
Source: Federal Election Commission

=== Polling ===
Poll source	Date(s) administered	Sample size	Margin of error	Sheri Biggs	Kevin Bishop	Mark Burns	Franky Franco	Stewart Jones	Other	Undecided
Cygnal (R)	May 13–14, 2024	400 (LV)	± 4.89%	12%	2%	11%	2%	9%	2% (Note: Phil Healy and Michael LaPierre with 1%, Elspeth Murday with 0%)	62%

==== Results ====
Republican primary results
Party	Candidate	Votes	%
Republican	Mark Burns	27,069	33.2
Republican	Sheri Biggs	23,523	28.8
Republican	Stewart Jones	15,260	18.7
Republican	Kevin Bishop	8,972	11.0
Republican	Franky Franco	3,494	4.3
Republican	Elspeth Murday	1,754	2.1
Republican	Philip Healy	1,552	1.9
Total votes		81,624	100.0

==== Runoff ====
===== Endorsements =====
Mark Burns

State legislators

- Stewart Jones, state representative from the 14th district (2019–present)

===== Fundraising =====
Campaign finance reports as of June 5, 2024
Candidate	Raised	Spent	Cash on hand
Sherri Biggs (R)	$564,715 (Note: $345,000 of this total was self-funded by Biggs)	$521,646	$43,068
Mark Burns (R)	$516,172 (Note: $500,000 of this total was self-funded by Burns)	$406,093	$111,424
Source: Federal Election Commission

==== Results ====
Republican primary results
Party	Candidate	Votes	%
Republican	Sheri Biggs	28,130	51.0
Republican	Mark Burns	27,043	49.0
Total votes		55,173	100.0

=== Democratic primary ===
==== Nominee ====
- Bryon Best, paint store manager

==== Eliminated in primary ====
- Frances Guldner, teacher

==== Results ====
Democratic primary results
Party	Candidate	Votes	%
Democratic	Bryon Best	5,188	62.4
Democratic	Frances Guldner	3,129	37.6
Total votes		8,317	100.0

=== Alliance Party ===
==== Nominee ====
- Michael Bedenbaugh, former Prosperity city councilor

=== General election ===
==== Predictions ====
Source	Ranking	As of
The Cook Political Report	Solid R	February 2, 2023
Inside Elections	Solid R	March 10, 2023
Sabato's Crystal Ball	Safe R	February 23, 2023
Elections Daily	Safe R	September 7, 2023
CNalysis	Solid R	November 16, 2023

==== Results ====
2024 South Carolina's 3rd congressional district election
Party	Candidate	Votes	%
Republican	Sheri Biggs	248,451	71.7
Democratic	Bryon Best	87,735	25.3
Alliance	Michael Bedenbaugh	9,918	2.9
Write-in		609	0.2
Total votes		346,713	100.0
Republican hold			

== District 4 ==
2024 South Carolina's 4th congressional district election

Nominee	William Timmons	Kathryn Harvey
Party	Republican	Democratic
Popular vote	206,916	128,976
Percentage	59.7%	37.2%
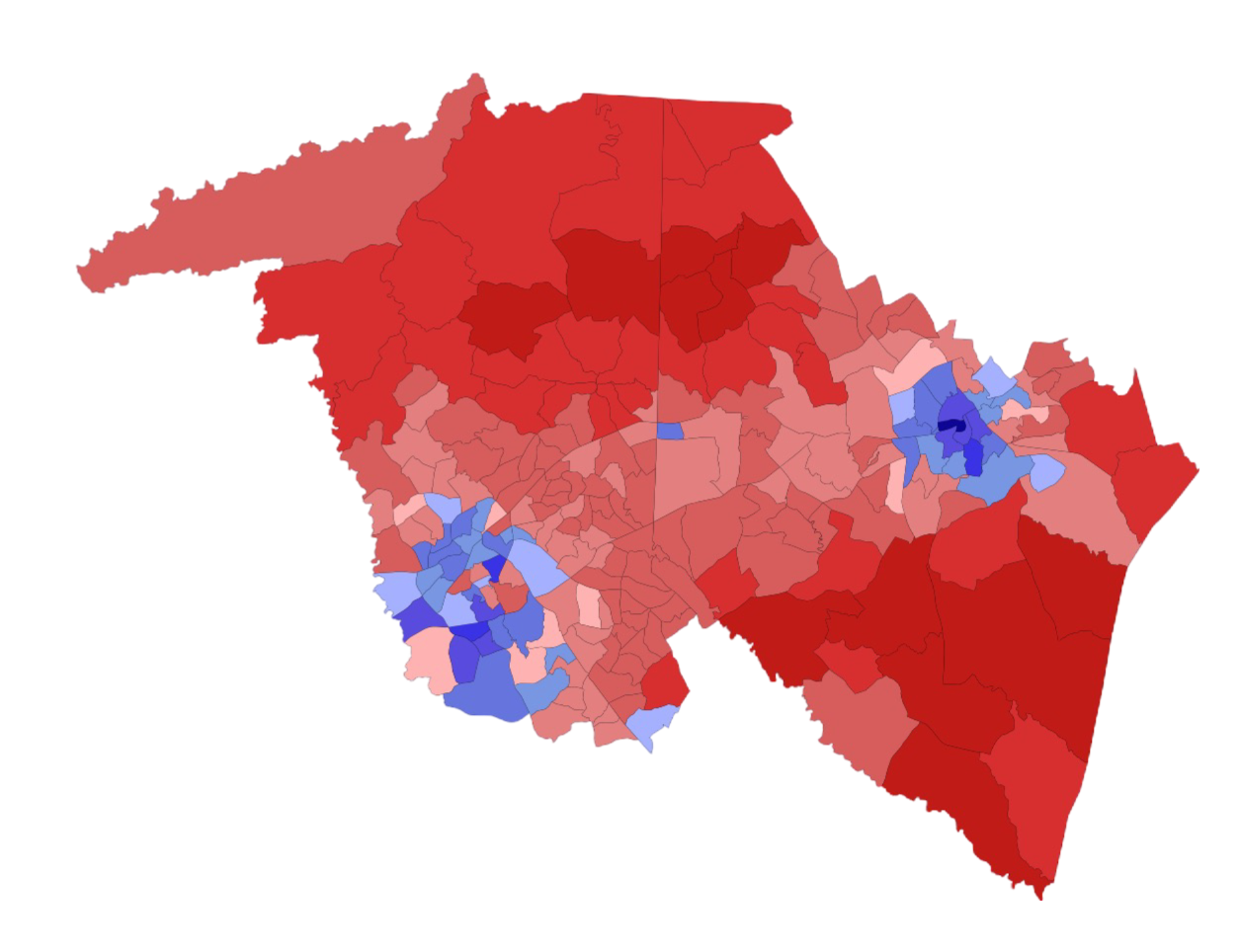
- Timmons: 40–50% 50–60% 60–70% 70–80% 80–90% Harvey: 40–50% 50–60% 60–70% 70–80% 80–90% >90%
U.S. Representative before election
William Timmons
Republican
Elected U.S. Representative
William Timmons
Republican

The incumbent is Republican William Timmons, who was re-elected unopposed in 2022.

=== Republican primary ===
==== Nominee ====
- William Timmons, incumbent U.S. representative

==== Eliminated in primary ====
- Adam Morgan, state representative from the 20th district (2018–present)

==== Endorsements ====
Adam Morgan

U.S. senators

- Jim DeMint, former U.S. senator from South Carolina (2005–2013)

U.S. representatives

- Dan Bishop, U.S. representative from North Carolina's 8th congressional district (2019–present)
- Josh Brecheen, U.S. representative from Oklahoma's 2nd congressional district (2023–present)
- Matt Gaetz, U.S. representative from Florida's 1st congressional district (2017–present)
- Bob Good, U.S. representative from Virginia's 5th congressional district (2021–present)
- Andy Harris, U.S. representative from Maryland's 1st congressional district (2011–present)
- Mary Miller, U.S. representative from Illinois's 15th congressional district (2021–present)
- Ralph Norman, U.S. representative from South Carolina's 5th congressional district (2017–present)
- Scott Perry, U.S. representative from Pennsylvania's 10th congressional district (2013–present)

Individuals

- Glenn Beck, conservative activist

Organizations

- Republicans for National Renewal
- House Freedom Fund
William Timmons

U.S. Executive Branch officials

- Donald Trump, former president of the United States

U.S. representatives

- Mike Johnson, Speaker of the United States House of Representatives (2023–present)
- Jim Jordan, U.S. representative from Ohio's 4th congressional district (2007–present)

Statewide officials

- Pamela Evette, Lieutenant Governor of South Carolina (2019–present)
- Henry McMaster, Governor of South Carolina (2017–present)

Organizations

- AIPAC
- National Right to Life Committee

==== Fundraising ====
Campaign finance reports as of May 22, 2024
Candidate	Raised	Spent	Cash on hand
Adam Morgan (R)	$578,077 (Note: $260,000 of this total was self-funded by Morgan)	$508,328	$69,748
William Timmons (R)	$1,911,070 (Note: $900,000 of this total was self-funded by Timmons)	$1,698,311	$224,772
Source: Federal Election Commission

==== Results ====
2024 GOP primary results by county: Timmons: 50–60%; Morgan: 50–60%

2024 GOP primary results by precinct: Timmons: 50–60%; 60–70%; 70–80%; 90–100%; Morgan: 50–60%; 60–70%; 70–80%; Tie

Republican primary results
Party	Candidate	Votes	%
Republican	William Timmons (incumbent)	36,533	51.6
Republican	Adam Morgan	34,269	48.4
Total votes		70,802	100.0

=== Democratic primary ===
==== Nominee ====
- Kathryn Harvey, chair of the Spartanburg County Democratic Party

==== Fundraising ====
Campaign finance reports as of May 22, 2024
Candidate	Raised	Spent	Cash on hand
Kathryn Harvey (D)	$116,108	$57,010	$59,097
Source: Federal Election Commission

=== Constitution Party ===
==== Declared ====
- Michael Chandler, retiree and nominee for this district in 2016, 2018, and 2020
- Mark Hackett, nominee for the 6th district in 2020

=== General election ===
==== Debate ====
2024 South Carolina's 4th congressional district debate
No.	Date	Host	Moderator	Link	Republican	Democratic
Key: P Participant A Absent N Not invited I Invited W Withdrawn						
Key: P Participant A Absent N Not invited I Invited W Withdrawn					Williams Timmons	Kathryn Harvey
1	Oct. 23, 2024	WHNS	Justin Dougherty	YouTube (Part 1); YouTube (Part 2); YouTube (Part 3)	P	P

==== Predictions ====
Source	Ranking	As of
The Cook Political Report	Solid R	February 2, 2023
Inside Elections	Solid R	March 10, 2023
Sabato's Crystal Ball	Safe R	February 23, 2023
Elections Daily	Safe R	September 7, 2023
CNalysis	Solid R	November 16, 2023

==== Results ====
2024 South Carolina's 4th congressional district election
Party	Candidate	Votes	%
Republican	William Timmons	206,916	59.7
Democratic	Kathryn Harvey	128,976	37.2
Constitution	Mark Hackett	9,779	2.8
Write-in		743	0.2
Total votes		346,414	100.0
Republican hold			

== District 5 ==
2024 South Carolina's 5th congressional district election
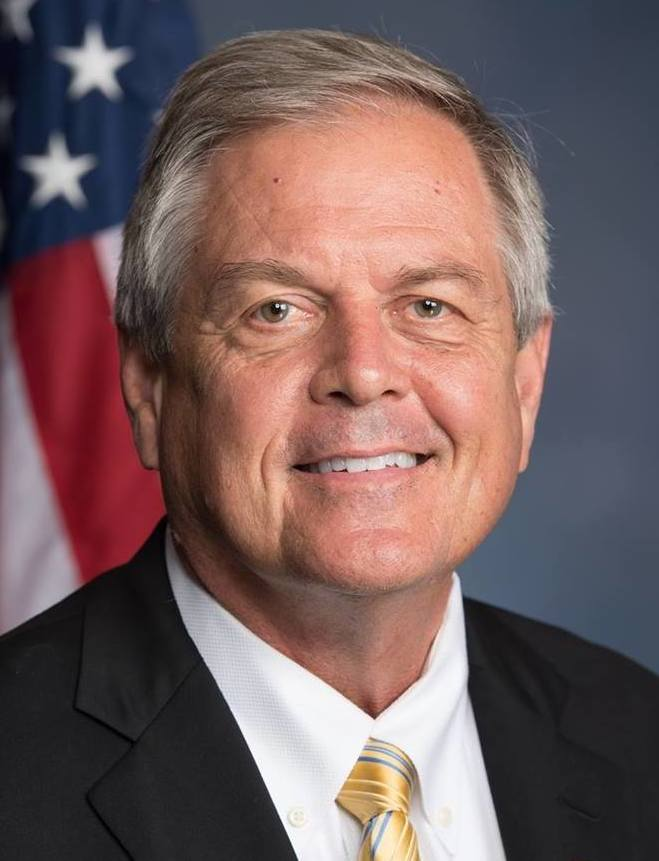

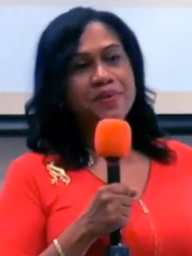
Nominee	Ralph Norman	Evangeline Hundley
Party	Republican	Democratic
Popular vote	228,260	130,592
Percentage	63.5%	36.3%
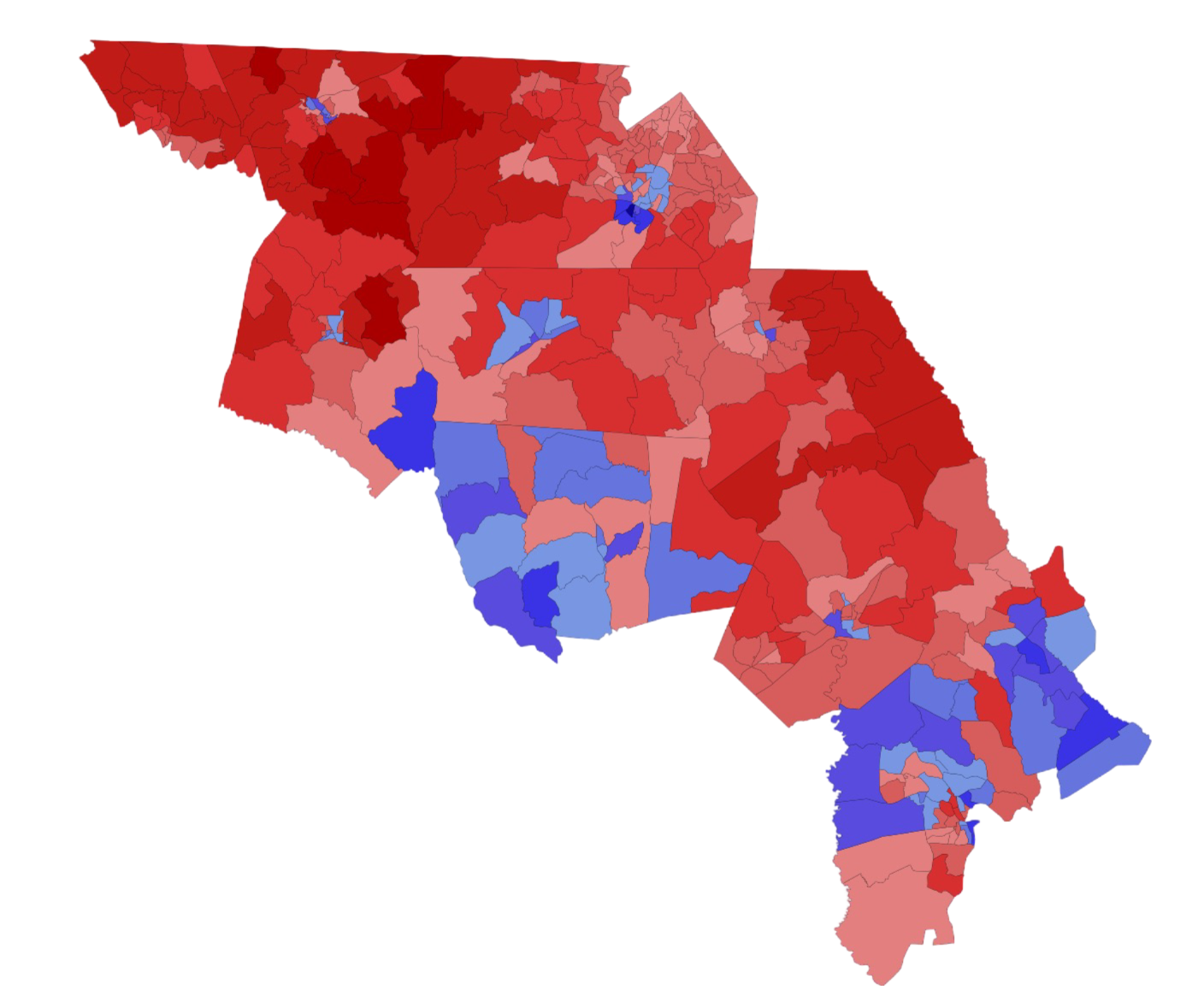
- Norman: 50–60% 60–70% 70–80% 80–90% >90% Hundley: 50–60% 60–70% 70–80% 80–90% >90%
U.S. Representative before election
Ralph Norman
Republican
Elected U.S. Representative
Ralph Norman
Republican

The incumbent is Republican Ralph Norman, who was re-elected with 64.05% of the vote in 2022.

=== Republican primary ===
==== Nominee ====
- Ralph Norman, incumbent U.S. Representative

==== Endorsements ====
Ralph Norman

Organizations

- AIPAC
- National Right to Life Committee
- Turning Point Action

==== Fundraising ====
Campaign finance reports as of May 22, 2024
Candidate	Raised	Spent	Cash on hand
Ralph Norman (R)	$273,260	$230,036	$574,774
Source: Federal Election Commission

=== Democratic primary ===
==== Nominee ====
- Evangeline Hundley, realtor and nominee for this district in 2022

==== Fundraising ====
Campaign finance reports as of May 22, 2024
Candidate	Raised	Spent	Cash on hand
Evangeline Hundley (D)	$7,203 (Note: $1,110 of this total was self-funded by Hundley)	$7,145	$57
Source: Federal Election Commission

=== General election ===
==== Predictions ====
Source	Ranking	As of
The Cook Political Report	Solid R	February 2, 2023
Inside Elections	Solid R	March 10, 2023
Sabato's Crystal Ball	Safe R	February 23, 2023
Elections Daily	Safe R	September 7, 2023
CNalysis	Solid R	November 16, 2023

==== Results ====
2024 South Carolina's 5th congressional district election
Party	Candidate	Votes	%
Republican	Ralph Norman (incumbent)	228,260	63.5
Democratic	Evangeline Hundley	130,592	36.3
Write-in		557	0.2
Total votes		359,409	100.0
Republican hold			

== District 6 ==
2024 South Carolina's 6th congressional district election
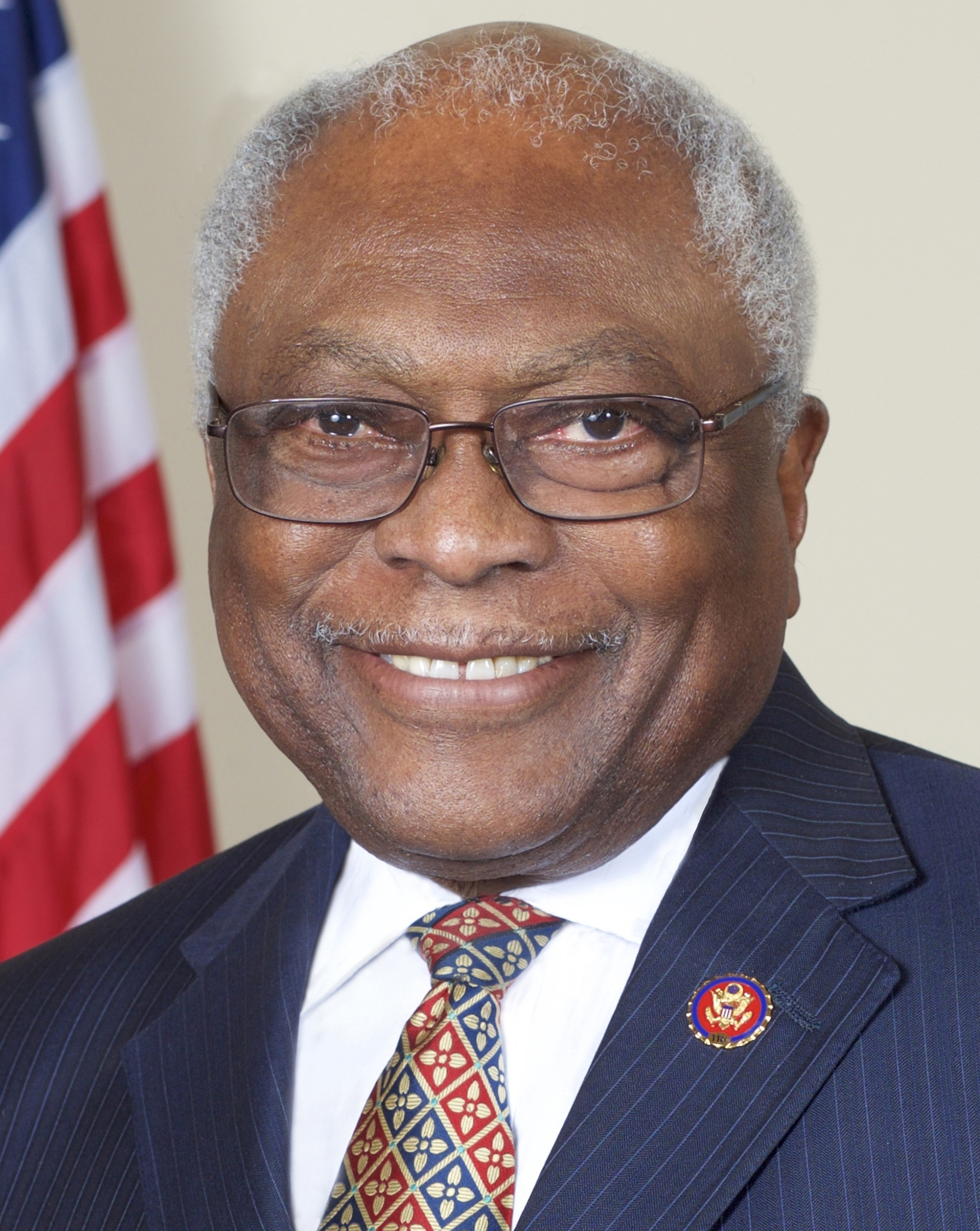

Nominee	Jim Clyburn	Duke Buckner
Party	Democratic	Republican
Popular vote	182,056	112,360
Percentage	59.5%	36.7%
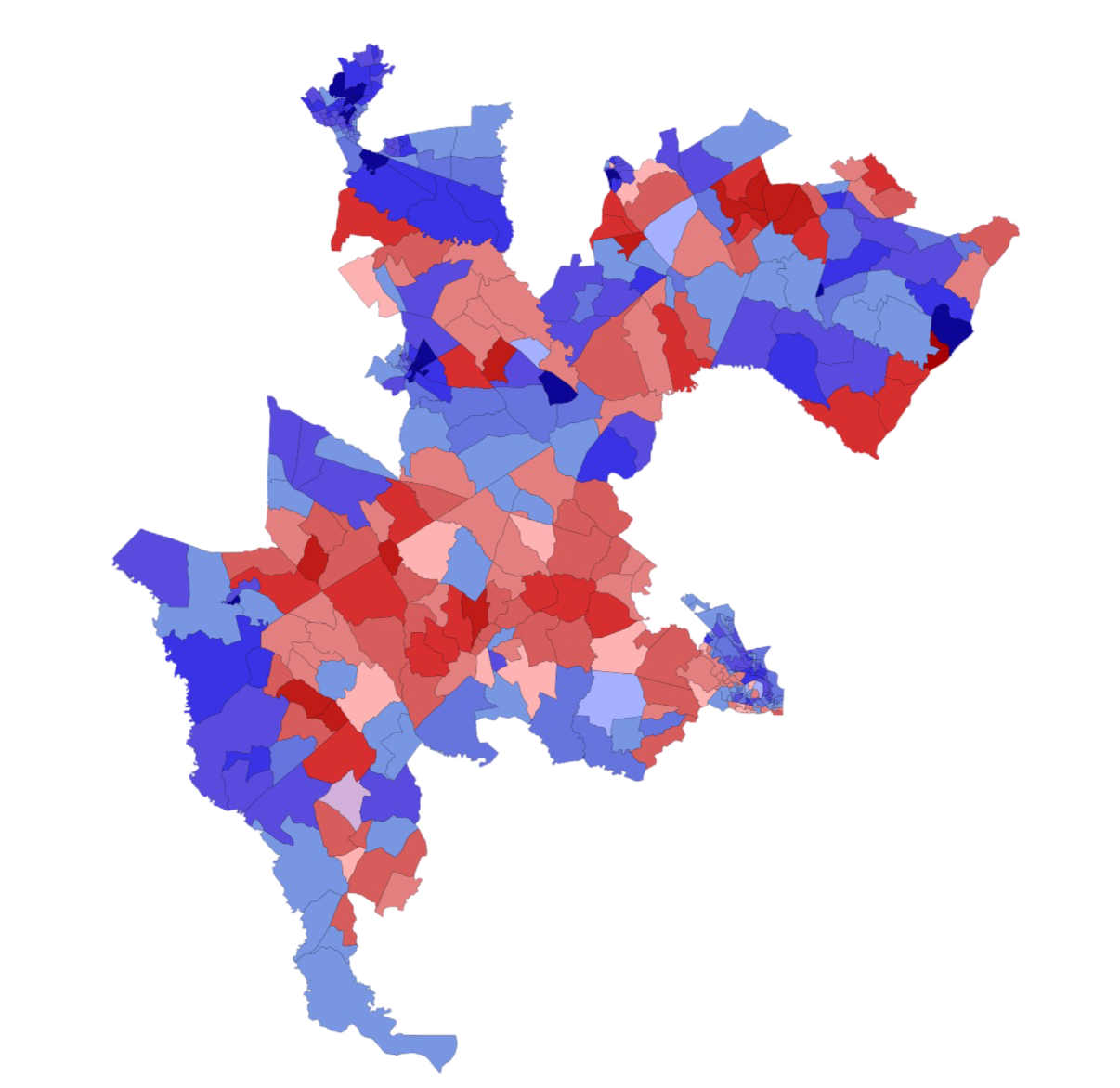
- Clyburn: 40–50% 50–60% 60–70% 70–80% 80–90% >90% Buckner: 40–50% 50–60% 60–70% 70–80% 80–90% >90% Tie: 40–50%
U.S. Representative before election
Jim Clyburn
Democratic
Elected U.S. Representative
Jim Clyburn
Democratic

The 6th district runs through the Black Belt and takes in Columbia and North Charleston. The incumbent is Democrat Jim Clyburn, who was re-elected with 62.11% of the vote in 2022.

=== Democratic primary ===
==== Nominee ====
- Jim Clyburn, incumbent U.S. Representative

==== Endorsements ====
Jim Clyburn

Organizations

- AIPAC
- Democratic Majority for Israel
- Everytown for Gun Safety Action Fund
- Feminist Majority PAC
- National Organization for Women PAC
- Planned Parenthood Action Fund

==== Fundraising ====
Campaign finance reports as of May 22, 2024
Candidate	Raised	Spent	Cash on hand
Jim Clyburn (D)	$1,429,300	$1,875,216	$1,848,620
Source: Federal Election Commission

=== Republican primary ===
==== Nominee ====
- Duke Buckner, former Walterboro city councilor, nominee for this district in 2022, and candidate for U.S. Senate in 2020

==== Eliminated in primary ====
- Justin Scott, welding contractor

==== Fundraising ====
Campaign finance reports as of May 22, 2024
Candidate	Raised	Spent	Cash on hand
Duke Buckner (R)	$93,209	$44,237	$50,086
Justin Scott (R)	$10,499	$8,352	$2,146
Source: Federal Election Commission

==== Results ====
Republican primary results
Party	Candidate	Votes	%
Republican	Duke Buckner	10,145	55.8
Republican	Justin Scott	8,050	44.2
Total votes		18,195	100.0

=== Alliance Party ===
==== Nominee ====
- Joseph Oddo, acquisitions consultant and nominee for the 1st district in 2022

=== Libertarian Party ===
==== Nominee ====
- Michael Simpson

=== United Citizens Party ===
==== Nominee ====
- Gregg Dixon, teacher and Democratic candidate for this district in 2022

==== Fundraising ====
Campaign finance reports as of May 22, 2024
Candidate	Raised	Spent	Cash on hand
Gregg Dixon (UC)	$89,813	$99,473	$8,378
Source: Federal Election Commission

=== General election ===
==== Predictions ====
Source	Ranking	As of
The Cook Political Report	Solid D	February 2, 2023
Inside Elections	Solid D	March 10, 2023
Sabato's Crystal Ball	Safe D	February 23, 2023
Elections Daily	Safe D	September 7, 2023
CNalysis	Solid D	November 16, 2023

==== Results ====
2024 South Carolina's 6th congressional district election
Party	Candidate	Votes	%
Democratic	Jim Clyburn (incumbent)	182,056	59.5
Republican	Duke Buckner	112,360	36.7
Libertarian	Michael Simpson	5,279	1.7
United Citizens	Gregg Dixon	4,927	1.6
Alliance	Joseph Oddo	1,056	0.4
Write-in		299	0.1
Total votes		305,977	100.0
Democratic hold			

== District 7 ==
2024 South Carolina's 7th congressional district election
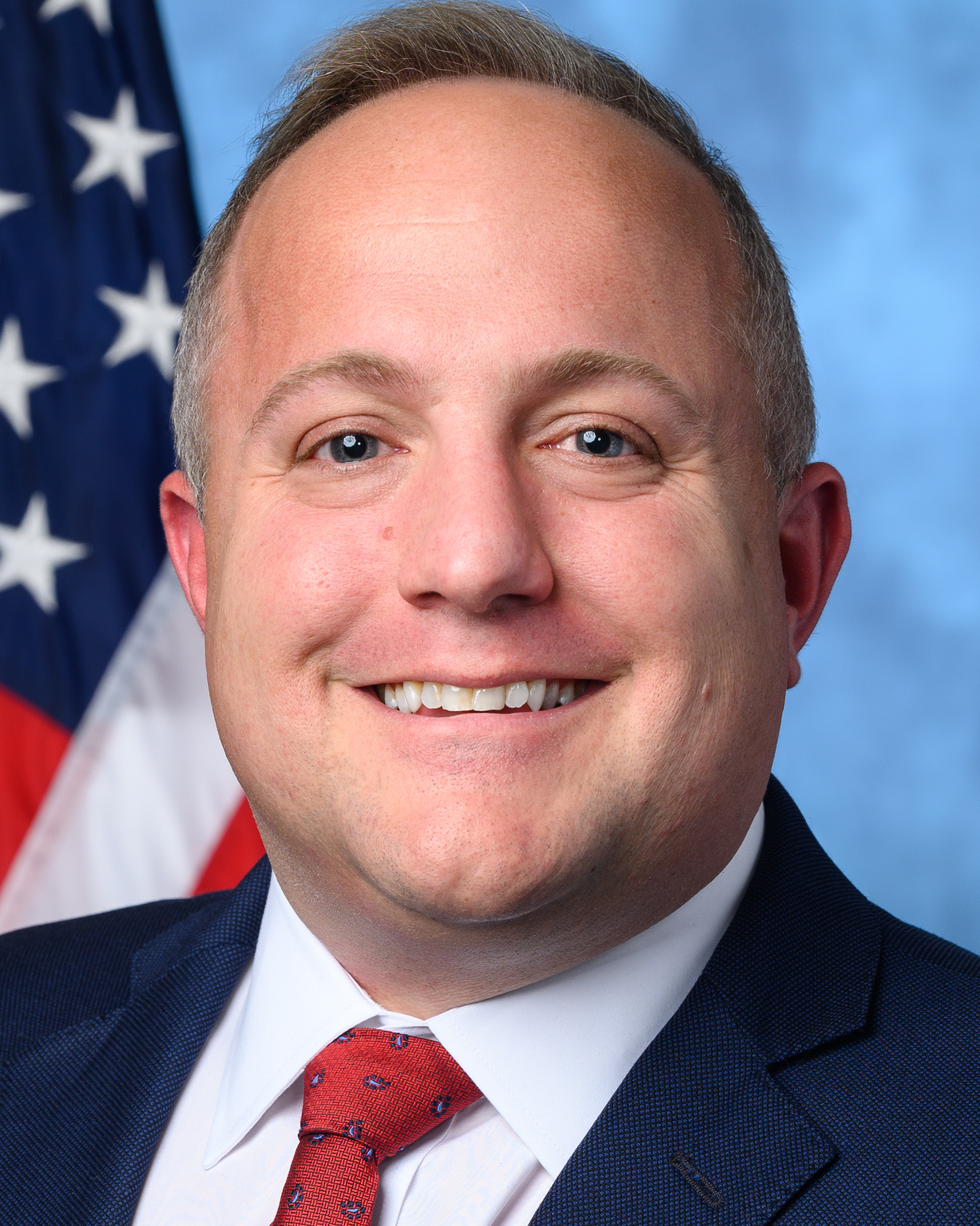

Nominee	Russell Fry	Mal Hyman
Party	Republican	Democratic
Popular vote	240,326	129,522
Percentage	64.9%	35.0%
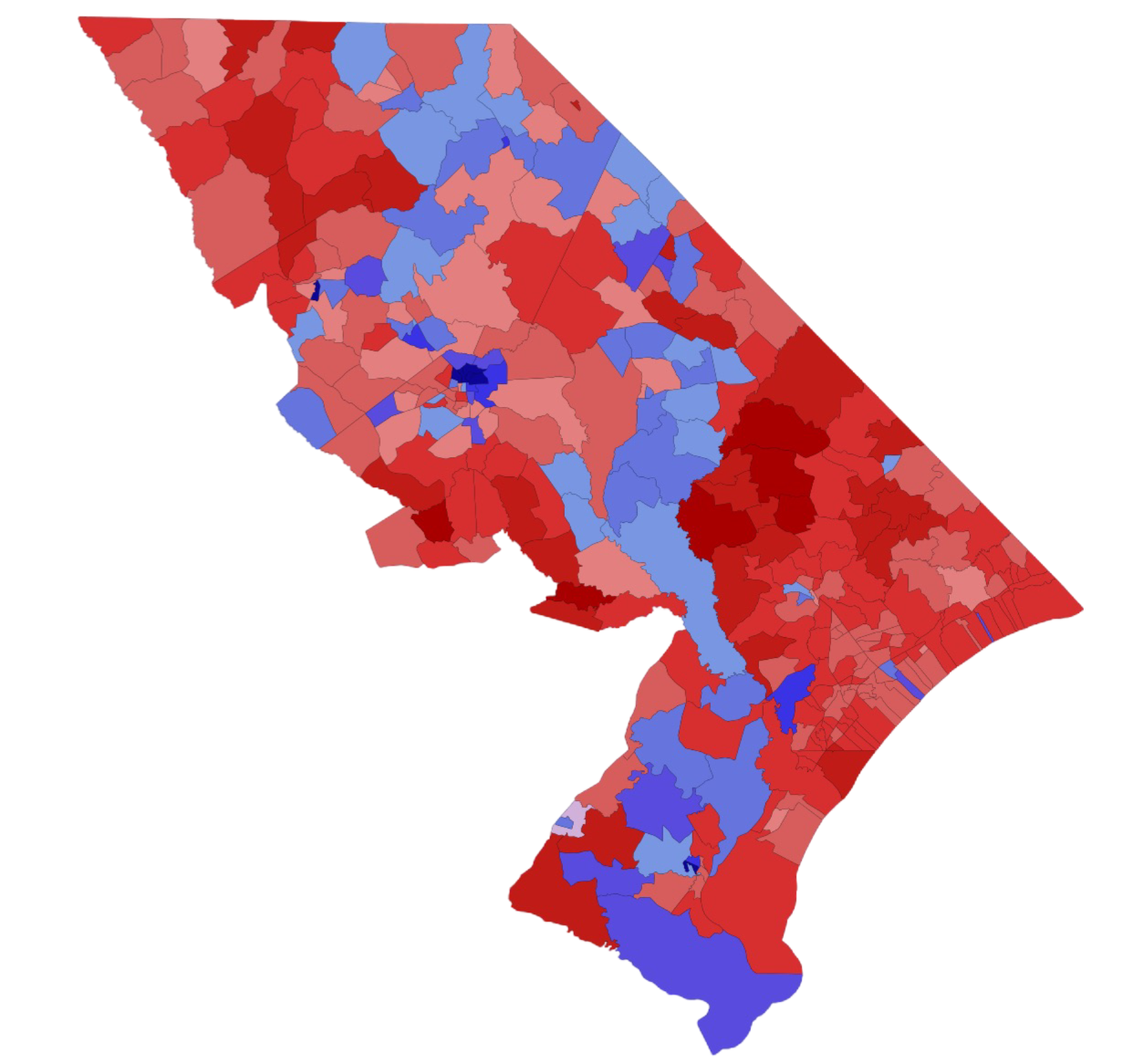
- Fry: 50–60% 60–70% 70–80% 80–90% >90% Hyman: 50–60% 60–70% 70–80% 80–90% >90% Tie: 40–50%
U.S. Representative before election
Russel Fry
Republican
Elected U.S. Representative
Russel Fry
Republican

The 7th district is located in northeastern South Carolina, taking in Myrtle Beach and Florence. The incumbent is Republican Russell Fry, who was elected with 64.88% of the vote in 2022.

=== Republican primary ===
==== Nominee ====
- Russell Fry, incumbent U.S. representative

==== Endorsements ====
Russell Fry

Organizations

- AIPAC

==== Fundraising ====
Campaign finance reports as of May 22, 2024
Candidate	Raised	Spent	Cash on hand
Russell Fry (R)	$966,282	$731,244	$444,775
Source: Federal Election Commission

=== Democratic primary ===
==== Nominee ====
- Mal Hyman, retired professor, nominee for this district in 2016 and candidate in 2018

==== Eliminated in primary ====
- Daryl Scott, doctoral student and nominee for this district in 2022

==== Fundraising ====
Campaign finance reports as of May 22, 2024
Candidate	Raised	Spent	Cash on hand
Mal Hyman (D)	$34,904 (Note: $10,000 of this total was self-funded by Hyman)	$34,187	$716
Source: Federal Election Commission

==== Results ====
Democratic primary results
Party	Candidate	Votes	%
Democratic	Mal Hyman	12,617	50.8
Democratic	Daryl Scott	12,218	49.2
Total votes		24,835	100.0

=== General election ===
==== Predictions ====
Source	Ranking	As of
The Cook Political Report	Solid R	February 2, 2023
Inside Elections	Solid R	March 10, 2023
Sabato's Crystal Ball	Safe R	February 23, 2023
Elections Daily	Safe R	September 7, 2023
CNalysis	Solid R	November 16, 2023

==== Results ====
2024 South Carolina's 7th congressional district election
Party	Candidate	Votes	%
Republican	Russell Fry (incumbent)	240,326	64.9
Democratic	Mal Hyman	129,522	35.0
Write-in		481	0.1
Total votes		370,329	100.0
Republican hold			
