= Marianne Williamson 2020 presidential campaign =

American political campaign

Marianne Williamson for President
- Campaign: 2020 United States presidential election (Democratic Party primaries)
- Candidate: Marianne Williamson; Spiritual teacher and author
- EC formed: November 15, 2018
- Announced: January 28, 2019
- Suspended: January 10, 2020
- Headquarters: Sacramento, California
- Key people: Maurice Daniel (campaign manager); Paul Hodes (senior advisor and New Hampshire state director)
- Receipts: US$7,982,760.87 (December 31, 2019)
- Slogan: Join the Evolution

Website
- Official website

The 2020 presidential campaign of Marianne Williamson, an author, was announced on January 28, 2019, after the initial formation of an exploratory committee on November 15, 2018. Williamson's bid for the Democratic nomination was her second political campaign, after previously running as an independent to represent California's 33rd congressional district in 2014. Prior to her candidacy, Williamson was known as "Oprah's spiritual adviser" due to her frequent appearances on The Oprah Winfrey Show.

Williamson described herself as a "pretty straight-line progressive democrat". Her policy positions include $100 billion in reparations for slavery, a "Medicare for All model" for healthcare, a pathway to citizenship for undocumented immigrants without a "serious criminal background", establishing a "Department of Peace" to greatly expand the use of diplomacy and mediation, and support for the Green New Deal.

On January 10, 2020, Williamson announced she had ended her presidential campaign. She pledged to support the eventual Democratic nominee, but later announced her endorsement for Bernie Sanders at a February 23 rally in Austin, Texas.

== Background ==
On August 2, 2018, The Guardian reporter Ben Jacobs revealed that Marianne Williamson, a New Age author and spiritual leader known as "Oprah's spiritual adviser" thanks to her frequent appearances on The Oprah Winfrey Show, was considering a bid for the Democratic presidential nomination. He reported that she had visited Iowa earlier that week, appearing at the Des Moines area as well as Fairfield, a cultural magnet for practitioners of the Transcendental Meditation technique and where the Maharishi University of Management is based. Williamson had previously contested California's 33rd congressional district in the 2014 elections as a no party preference candidate, securing 13% of the vote in the state's top-two primary after self-funding $2 million in a campaign supported by Alanis Morissette and Dennis Kucinich.

She made several more visits to Iowa in September and October, stopping in Sioux City and Polk City, in addition to returning to Fairfield for small events with fans and local Democrats.

== Campaign ==
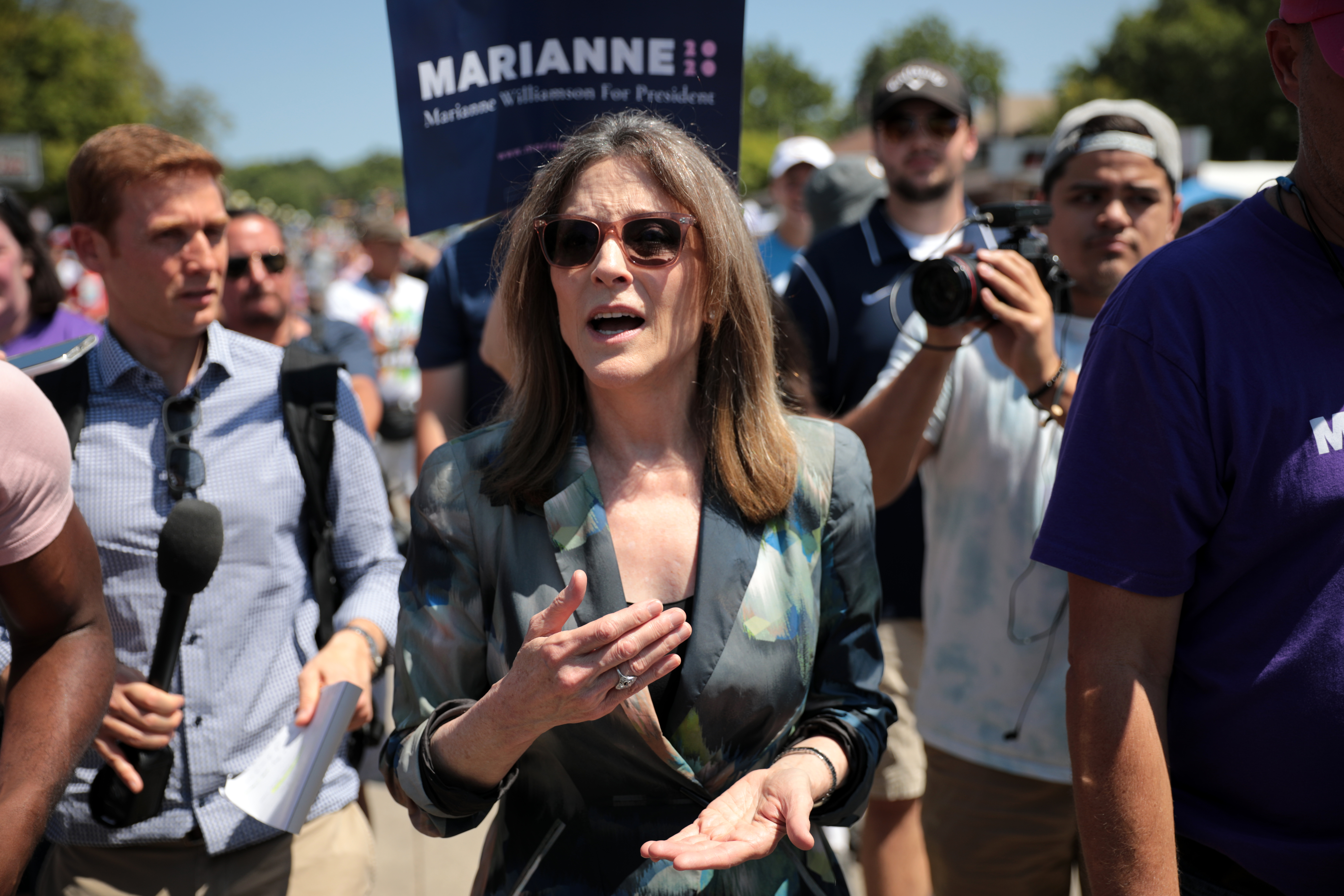
Williamson campaigning at the Iowa State Fair.

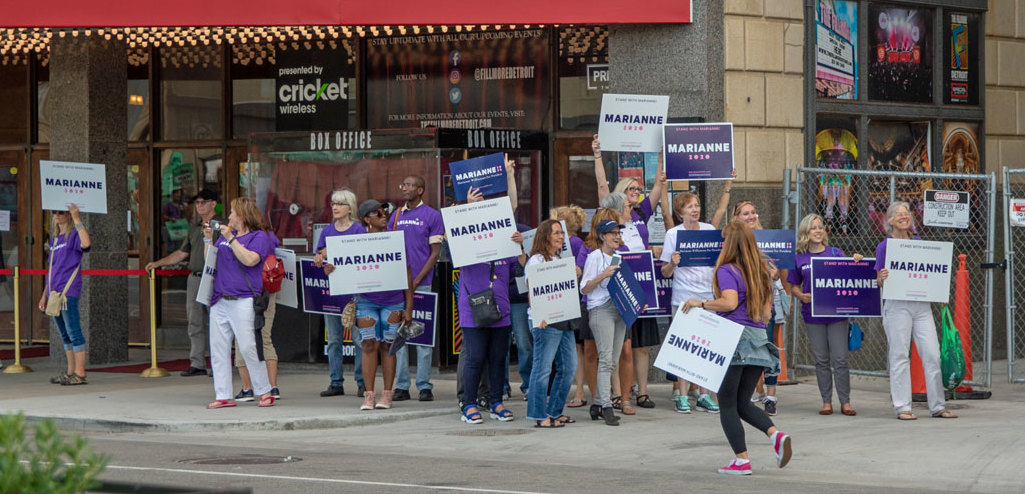
Williamson supporters in Detroit ahead of the July debate.

On November 15, 2018, Williamson announced the formation of a presidential exploratory committee in a video in which she acclaimed that there was a "miracle in this country in 1776 and we need another one," requiring "a co-creative effort, an effort of love and a gift of love, to our country and hopefully to our world." Visiting New Hampshire in early January, she said that she had "received enough positive energy to make me feel I should take the next step," and subsequently hired Brent Roske to lead her operation in Iowa.

Roske, a film producer who had also contested the same 2014 primary for the seat as Williamson now represented by Ted Lieu, maintained a wide network of connections in Iowa due in part to his previous involvement in the state, working on a political television show about the 2016 caucuses. In response to the Iowa Democratic Party's proposed creation of "virtual caucuses" in the 2020 race, Williamson's campaign announced that it would appoint 99 "Virtual Iowa Caucus Captains" (each assigned to a single county) to turn out supporters in both the virtual and in-person caucuses.

Williamson officially launched her presidential campaign in Los Angeles on January 28, 2019, in front of an audience of 2,000 attendees. She appointed Maurice Daniel, who had served alongside Donna Brazile in Dick Gephardt's campaign for the Democratic nomination in 1988, as her national campaign manager, with her campaign committee, "Marianne Williamson for President," officially filed on February 4. Following her Los Angeles announcement, she held her Iowa kickoff in Des Moines on January 31.

On February 16, in addition to scheduling another trip to New Hampshire, Williamson's campaign announced the appointment of former Congressman Paul Hodes, who had represented New Hampshire's 2nd congressional district from 2007 to 2011, as New Hampshire state director and senior campaign advisor. Former Georgia state assemblywoman Gloria Bromell Tinubu, who had returned to South Carolina in 2011 to run for Congress in the state's 7th district, and later joined Phil Noble's bid for governor in 2018 as his running mate, served as South Carolina state director and national senior advisor to the Williamson campaign. She later ceased working with the campaign.

On May 9, Williamson's campaign announced that she had received enough contributions from unique donors to enter the official primary debates, having raised $1.5 million in the first quarter of 2019, during which the campaign received donations from 46,663 unique individuals. She subsequently met the polling criteria, with three unique polls at 1% from qualifying pollsters, on May 23. In June, Williamson confirmed that she had moved to Des Moines, Iowa in advance of the 2020 caucuses.

Williamson's performance in the first debate was the subject of mockery for several statements. She claimed that her "first call [as President would be] to the prime minister of New Zealand," to say "girlfriend, you are so on...the United States of America is going to be the best place in the world for a child to grow up", which led to widespread mockery in New Zealand and was labelled "bizarre" by The New Zealand Herald. This, and her assertion that she would "harness love for political purposes" against Donald Trump, made her the subject of many Internet memes. The memes also led Republicans including Ted Cruz strategist Jeff Roe to call for donations to her campaign, to keep her on the stage for future debates to sideline the more likely candidates in favor of her. Williamson subsequently drew praise for challenging libertarianism on The Rubin Report. Her campaign was noted for receiving 70% of its funding from women. This was 13% higher than that of Julian Castro, the candidate with the next highest fraction of female support.

On January 2, 2020, Williamson laid off her entire campaign staff, with media speculating on her possible withdrawal, though one of her former staffers said that "...she plans to continue." She formally ended her campaign on January 10. She said, "To the remaining Democratic candidates, I wish you all my best on the road ahead. It was an honor being among you. Whichever one of you wins the nomination, I will be there with all my energy and in full support."

On February 23, 2020, Williamson appeared at a campaign rally in Austin, Texas for US Senator Bernie Sanders and officially announced her endorsement.

=== Staff relations ===
In 2023, a dozen former staffers from her 2020 campaign, who remained anonymous due to having signed non-disclosure agreements (NDAs), described a toxic work environment. One described it as, "It would be foaming, spitting, uncontrollable rage." "It was traumatic. And the experience, in the end, was terrifying." In contrast to her career message of love, she threw phones, some said, and shouted at them so intensely they were reduced to tears. Her anger over logistics in South Carolina had led her to strike a vehicle repeatedly, to the extent that her hand swelled so much she had to be transported for medical attention. Paul Hodes, the former U.S. congressman who served as Williamson's 2020 New Hampshire state director, said such descriptions mirrored his own experience working with her. "Those reports of Ms. Williamson’s behavior are consistent with my observations, consistent with contemporaneous discussions I had about her conduct with staff members, and entirely consistent with my own personal experience with her behavior on multiple occasions."

In response to the allegations, Marianne Williamson said such accusations of her behavior were “slanderous” and “categorically untrue" and that "Former staffers trying to score points with the political establishment by smearing me might be good for their careers, but the intention is to deflect attention from the important issues facing the American people."

== Political positions ==
Williamson has described herself as a "pretty straight-line progressive democrat," supporting an increase of the federal minimum wage to $15 per hour, reducing wealth inequality, addressing climate change, and tackling student loan debt. She backs a "Medicare for All model", Deferred Action for Childhood Arrivals (DACA), and a pathway to citizenship for undocumented immigrants without a "serious criminal background," and stated that the U.S. needs to be an "honest broker" in the Israeli–Palestinian conflict. One of her principal plans is the establishment of a Department of Peace to greatly expand the use of diplomacy, mediation, and educational and economic development. She also voices support for the Green New Deal, stricter gun control, criminal justice reform, improving public education, free college tuition, and raising the top marginal tax rate to a point where high earners pay "their fair share of taxes." She has described her policies as a "renovation" of a "sociopathic economic system" focused on "short-term profit maximization."

Her signature campaign promise is a call for $100 billion in reparations for slavery to be distributed over 10 years by a group of black leaders for selected "economic and education projects," and later suggested distributing $200 to $500 billion on The Breakfast Club, a sum far greater than any other primary contenders support. In doing so, Williamson became the only candidate in the Democratic field to submit a detailed plan for reparations for black Americans, though fellow Democratic presidential candidates Elizabeth Warren, Kamala Harris, and Beto O'Rourke later pledged support for reparations in late February 2019.
