= Yancey McGill =

American politician (born 1952)

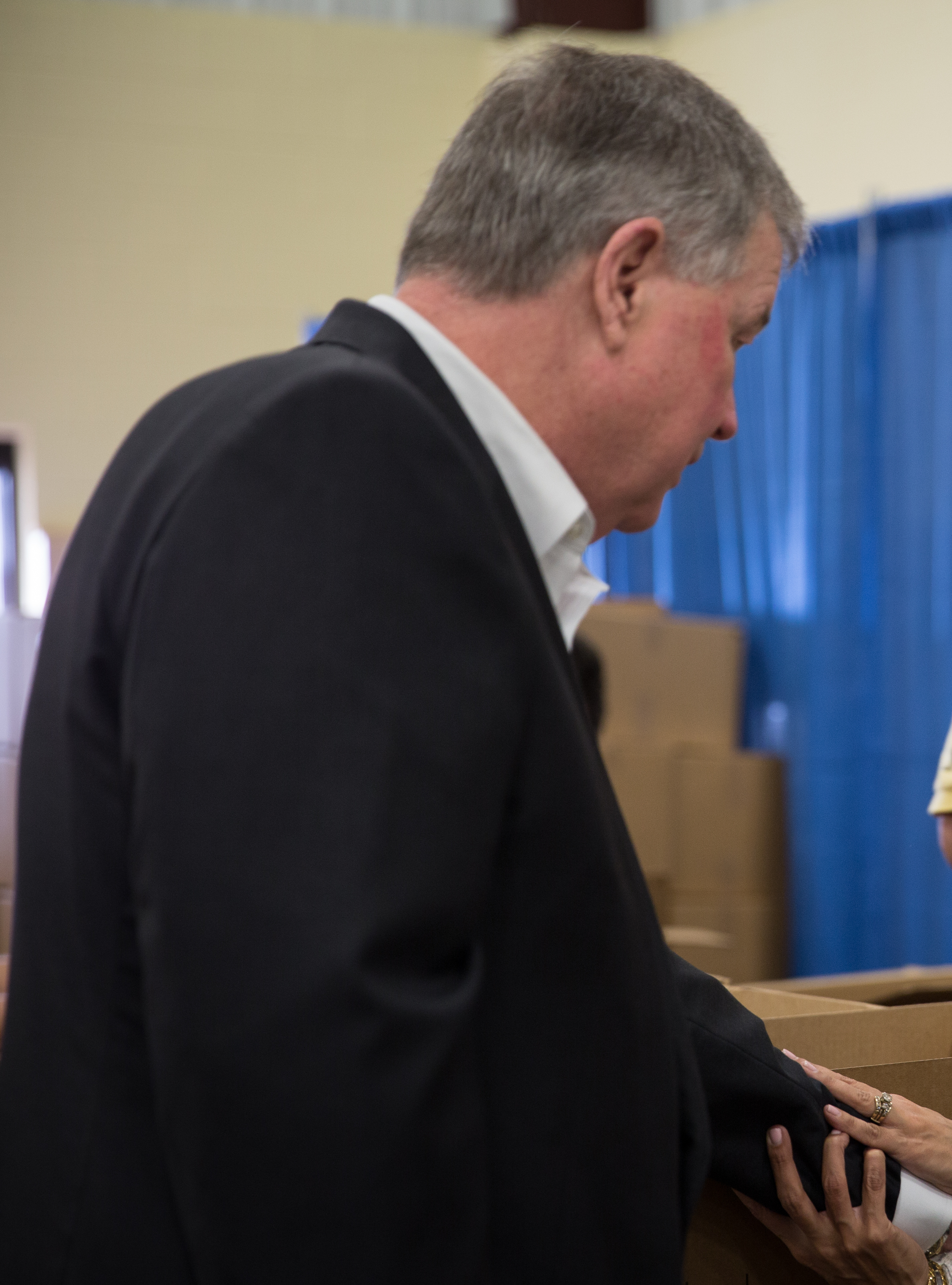
- McGill in 2015

Director of the South Carolina Department on Aging
- In office January 28, 2015 – August 10, 2015
- Governor: Nikki Haley
- Preceded by: Tony Kester
- Succeeded by: Kenneth Morris

Lieutenant Governor of South Carolina
- In office June 18, 2014 – January 14, 2015
- Governor: Nikki Haley
- Preceded by: Glenn F. McConnell
- Succeeded by: Henry McMaster

President pro tempore of the South Carolina Senate
- In office June 4, 2014 – June 18, 2014
- Preceded by: John E. Courson
- Succeeded by: Hugh K. Leatherman Sr.

Member of the South Carolina Senate from the 32nd district
- In office January 10, 1989 – June 18, 2014
- Preceded by: Frank McGill
- Succeeded by: Ronnie Sabb

Personal details
- Born: John Yancey McGill; September 18, 1952 (age 74) Kingstree, South Carolina, U.S.
- Party: Democratic (before 2016); Republican (2016–present)
- Spouse: Pamela Fennell (m. 1973)
- Children: 3
- Education: Francis Marion University (attended)

John Yancey McGill (born September 18, 1952) is an American politician from South Carolina. He was a member of the state Senate from 1989 to 2014. He served as the 90th lieutenant governor of South Carolina from June 2014 to January 2015. He was the last Democrat to hold statewide office in South Carolina, until the appointment of Brian J. Gaines as Comptroller General by Governor Henry McMaster in 2023.

== Career ==
McGill was born on September 18, 1952, in Kingstree, South Carolina. He attended, but did not graduate from The Citadel. He also attended Francis Marion College.

He is a real estate broker and homebuilder.

== Political career ==
McGill was formerly a Democratic member of the South Carolina Senate, representing the 32nd District from 1989 to June 18, 2014. His district, which covered Williamsburg and Georgetown counties, was heavily Democratic.

McGill became lieutenant governor after Glenn F. McConnell resigned to become president of The College of Charleston, becoming the first Democrat to hold the office since 1995. Although a Democrat, McGill ran unopposed for Senate president pro tempore in the Republican-controlled state Senate, winning a position usually held by a senator from the majority party. Immediately upon election, as planned, McConnell resigned, then McGill resigned, automatically being elevated to the post of lieutenant governor under the order of succession set forth in the state Constitution.

McGill chose not to run for election to a full term. Republican Henry McMaster succeeded him as lieutenant governor on January 14, 2015, having won the November 2014 election.

In January 2015, McMaster appointed McGill to be the State Director of South Carolina's Office on Aging. The position paid $122,000 a year. He stayed at the position for eight months before stepping down, retiring to his family farm in Kingstree.

In March 2016, McGill left the Democratic Party and announced his intention to run for governor of South Carolina as a Republican in the 2018 election. He had been a conservative Democrat for most of his career; he opposed abortion and supported curbs on government spending and regulation. He said that he hadn't changed parties sooner because his state senate district was too Democratic for him to be elected as a Republican. McGill was considered a long-shot contender in the Republican gubernatorial race, raising less money than McMaster or Catherine Templeton.

On June 12, 2018, McGill placed last in the gubernatorial Republican primary, receiving 1.7% percent of the vote. He led in Williamsburg County, his home county.

South Carolina Gubernatiorial Primary (Republican), 2018
| Candidate | Votes | % |
| Henry McMaster | 155,072 | 42.3 |
| John Warren | 102,006 | 27.8 |
| Catherine Templeton | 78,432 | 21.4 |
| Kevin L. Bryant | 24,699 | 6.7 |
| Yancey McGill | 6,349 | 1.7 |

== Personal life ==
McGill married Pamela Jean Fennell on May 18, 1973; they have three children. He currently resides in his hometown in Kingstree, South Carolina.

Political offices
| Preceded by Glenn F. McConnell | Lieutenant Governor of South Carolina; 2014–2015 | Succeeded by Henry McMaster |
