= Mandy Powers Norrell =

American politician (born 1973)

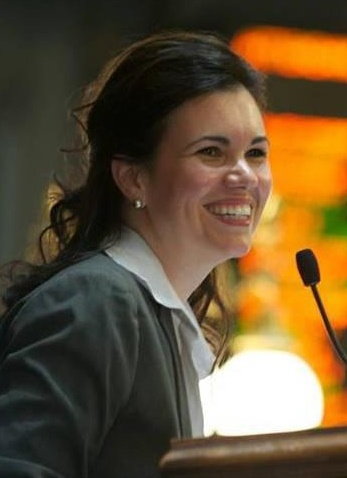

Member of the South Carolina House of Representatives from the 44th district
- In office November 12, 2012 – November 9, 2020
- Preceded by: James Neal
- Succeeded by: Sandy McGarry

Personal details
- Born: Mandy Powers; July 12, 1973 (age 53) Lancaster, South Carolina, U.S.
- Party: Democratic
- Spouse: Mitchell Norrell (1995–present)
- Children: 2
- Education: Furman University (BA); University of South Carolina, Columbia (JD)
- Website: Campaign website

Mandy Powers Norrell (born July 12, 1973) is an American lawyer, politician and former Democratic member of the South Carolina House of Representatives. Norrell formerly represented House District 44, which comprises the southern portion of Lancaster County. Norrell is an attorney and licensed to practice in both North and South Carolina, in South Carolina State and Federal Courts, and in the United States Fourth Circuit Court of Appeals. Prior to her election into the South Carolina House of Representatives Norrell was the city attorney for the City of Lancaster from 1999 through 2012, and Town Attorney for the Town of Kershaw, South Carolina from 2010 through 2012.

== Early life, education and career ==
Mandy Powers Norrell was born in 1973 in Lancaster, South Carolina, the daughter of Beverly B. and the late Carl R. Powers. She graduated cum laude with a B.A. from Furman University in 1995. Powers Norrell received her Juris Doctor degree from the University of South Carolina School of Law in 1997, from which she also graduated cum laude, Order of the Coif, and Order of the Wig and Robe. Norrell has been a practicing attorney since 1997. She is a member of First Baptist Church, Lancaster, South Carolina, and a partner at Norrell and Powers Norrell, LLC.

== Political career ==
=== South Carolina House of Representatives ===
Mandy Powers Norrell was elected to the South Carolina House of Representatives on November 6, 2012, to succeed James M. Neal. She was sworn into office on December 4, 2012.

Committee assignments • Agricultural, Natural Resources, and Environmental Affairs Committee

In 2016 she gave the official Democratic response to Governor Nikki Haley's State of the State address.

=== Lt. Governor race ===
On May 5, 2018, James Smith selected her as his Lieutenant Governor running mate in his bid for Governor of South Carolina in the 2018 election, but they were defeated by Governor Henry McMaster and his running mate, Pamela Evette, on November 6, 2018.

Norell was defeated for reelection in November 2020.

== Personal life ==
Mandy Powers Norrell married fellow attorney Mitchell A. Norrell on March 18, 1995. Together they have two children; Powers Thaddeus and Emma Ross. Norrell and her family reside in Lancaster, South Carolina.

== Controversial Army–Navy Game remark ==
Following the Army–Navy Game on December 14, 2019, Norrell sent a tweet accusing players of making "white power" hand gestures. Officials from the United States Military Academy and the United States Naval Academy investigated the incident and cleared the accused cadets and midshipmen of wrongdoing. Norrell deleted the tweet and apologized.

== Notes/further reading ==
- Rep. Norrell's Democratic Response to Governor Nikki Haley's State of the State Address, January 2016.

Party political offices
Preceded by Bakari Sellers	Democratic nominee for Lieutenant Governor of South Carolina; 2018	Succeeded by Tally Parham Casey
