= Disappearance of Daniel Robinson =

Missing person case in Arizona

Daniel Robinson
- Born: January 14, 1997
- Disappeared: June 23, 2021 (aged 24); Buckeye, Arizona, U.S.
- Status: Missing for 5 years, 3 months and 3 days
- Height: 5 ft 8 in (173 cm)
- Parents: David Robinson II (father); Melissa Edmonds (mother)

Locations
1 Last job site
2 Jeep found.
3 Last sighting.
4 Horizontal mine shaft.
5 Well site

Daniel Robinson (born 1997, disappeared 2021) is an American geologist who was last seen leaving a job site in Buckeye, Arizona on June 23, 2021 and reported missing later that day. Robinson's Jeep was found nearby about a month after his disappearance and some four miles away from the place he was last seen, but no further evidence of his fate or whereabouts is known.

== Background ==
Daniel Robinson was born without his lower right arm, but still was active in athletics. He graduated from the College of Charleston in 2017 with an undergraduate degree in geology. After graduation, he relocated to Arizona where he found work as a hydrogeologist.

Robinson is described by investigators and family as a 5'8" African-American man, who weighed 165 pounds at the time of his disappearance. He has black hair and brown eyes and is missing part of his right forearm, including his hand.

== Disappearance ==
Robinson lived in Tempe, Arizona, but worked for the engineering company Matrix New World, in the far West Valley. Robinson was last seen leaving his job site in Buckeye, Arizona, on June 23, 2021, by a coworker he had met for the first time that day. He had moved into the Phoenix area after graduating as a field geologist in 2019. Robinson was last seen near Sun Valley Parkway and Cactus Road, on June 23, 2021, around 9:45 am, in his 2017 blue-grey Jeep Renegade headed west towards the desert.

On July 19, 2021, a rancher found the Jeep rolled over on its side in a ravine on his property, with the airbags deployed, and evidence in the vehicle indicating that the driver was wearing a seatbelt at the time of the crash. Several personal items of Robinson's were found with the vehicle, such as his cell phone, wallet, keys, and clothes.

== Investigation ==
In late July 2021, a human skull was found in the area south of where Robinson's vehicle was recovered. Testing later indicated that the skull was not that of Robinson, and no additional human remains were recovered at that time.

In a statement made on September 16, 2021, the Buckeye Police Department announced that they had worked with outside agencies to search over 70 square miles, with the assistance of UTVs, cadaver dogs, drones, and helicopters.

After the discovery of the Jeep, Robinson's family hired Jeff McGrath, an accident reconstructionist and private investigator. McGrath suggested that the accident scene had been staged. He stated that after the airbags deployed, the ignition was turned over 46 more times, and that there was an additional 11 mi (18 km) on the car's odometer that registered after the car crashed. McGrath also noted there was red paint on Robinson's Jeep that had been transferred from another vehicle, which suggested a collision prior to when the Jeep came to rest in the ravine.

The rancher who found Robinson's car had been in the area on July 17, 2021 as he searched for his cattle, but he asserted that Robinson's car was not in the ravine until he returned on July 19, 2021. Thus, Robinson's family doesn't believe Daniel's car was in the ravine for 30 days since the time of his disappearance.

After his disappearance, someone went into Daniel Robinson's apartment in Tempe, ransacked his closet and accessed his laptop. Robinson's family convinced the Tempe Police Department to do forensics work on all of Daniel's electronics including his personal computer and gaming system. The results of that forensics work indicated that someone had been looking at Daniel's search history and "just fooling around on this computer."

Investigators in October 2021 announced that Robinson had been texting a woman he met while delivering for Instacart and reportedly was invited inside and exchanged numbers with her. Later text messages showed that he visited her home several times unannounced, and the woman indicated that she was extremely uncomfortable with his actions. Police initially interviewed friends, family and coworkers about Robinson being suicidal over the situation, but all told investigators that he was not.

On November 9, 2021, it was announced that a second set of human remains had been discovered while searching for Robinson, and had been sent out for DNA testing and identification. The preliminary investigation, based on anthropological indication of race and the amount of time outside, has led officials to believe neither set of remains to be Robinson.

Daniel Robinson has not been found and his disappearance remains a mystery.

== Response ==
The Buckeye Police Department has been the lead law enforcement agency overseeing the investigation of Daniel Robinson's disappearance. Both the Tempe Police Department and the Maricopa County Sheriff's Office have provided assistance.

David Robinson has been critical in what he believes is minimal effort from law enforcement investigating Daniel's disappearance and has been particularly outspoken in his critique of the Buckeye Police. He disagreed with their decision to follow missing persons protocols, being slow to investigate his son's disappearance, but being quick to rule out foul play. David Robinson and his private investigator, Jeff McGrath, assert that Buckeye Police used insufficient investigative methods to rule out foul play. David Robinson also noted irregularities in the official Buckeye Police timeline of the case. This included a statement by Daniel's co-worker about the events the morning of his disappearance, which differed from what the initial Buckeye officer on the case had stated.

The family has also put together a GoFundMe page to help gather donations to pay for a private investigator, and a petition to keep interest in the case. David Robinson also set up a website to raise visibility of Daniel's disappearance.

Robinson's parents participated in the Facebook Watch series Red Table Talk to discuss Robinson's disappearance, and the difficulties they faced working with investigators to search for their son.

Social media sources have also pointed out the lack of national attention that was being given to Robinson's case compared to that of the disappearance of Gabby Petito, which critics see as an example of missing white woman syndrome.
