= Pamela Evette =

American politician and businesswoman (born 1967)

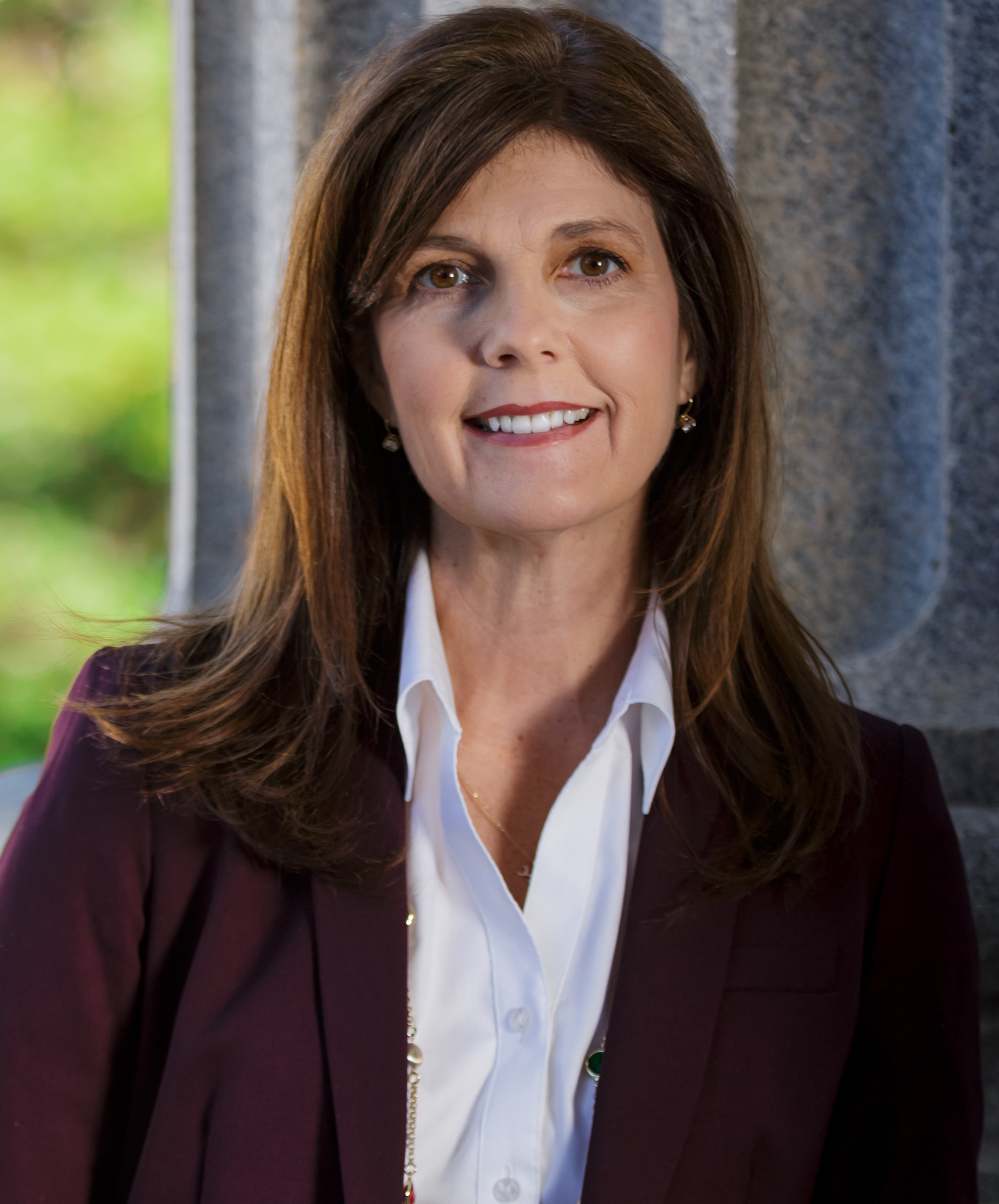
- Official portrait, 2019

93rd Lieutenant Governor of South Carolina
- In office January 9, 2019 – January 13, 2027
- Governor: Henry McMaster
- Preceded by: Kevin L. Bryant

66th Chair of the National Lieutenant Governors Association
- Incumbent
- Assumed office 2025
- Preceded by: Garlin Gilchrist

Personal details
- Born: Pamela Sue Gajoch; August 28, 1967 (age 59) Cleveland, Ohio, U.S.
- Party: Republican
- Spouse: David Evette (m. 2005)
- Children: 3
- Education: Cleveland State University (BS)

Pamela Sue Evette (née Gajoch; born August 28, 1967) is an American politician and businesswoman serving as the 93rd lieutenant governor of South Carolina since 2019. A member of the Republican Party, she was the CEO of Quality Business Solutions in Upstate South Carolina before she was elected. Evette is the first lieutenant governor to be elected on the same ticket as the governor. In 2026, she ran for governor and lost the Republican primary runoff to state Attorney General Alan Wilson.

== Early life, education, and career ==
Evette was born to Jennie and Emil Gajoch on August 28, 1967, in Cleveland, Ohio. She is the granddaughter of Polish immigrants.

Evette earned her bachelor's degree from Cleveland State University in 1989. She worked as founder and CEO of Quality Business Solutions (headquartered in Travelers Rest, South Carolina), a payroll, human resources and benefits management firm.

Governor Nikki Haley asked her to serve on a small-business regulation panel, and she was on the Small Business Regulatory Review Committee in 2017–18.

== Political career ==
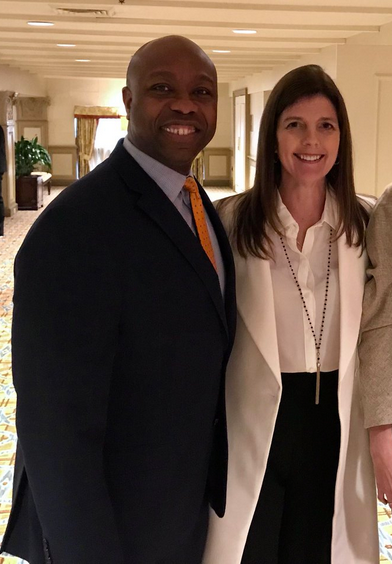
Evette (right) and Senator Tim Scott, 2018

=== Lieutenant governor of South Carolina ===
On November 6, 2018, Henry McMaster and Evette won South Carolina's gubernatorial election, defeating Democrats James Smith and Mandy Powers Norrell. When Evette took office on January 9, 2019, as the state's 93rd lieutenant governor, she became the first elected on a joint ticket with the governor, the first female Republican in the role, and the state's second woman overall (after Nancy Stevenson, 1979–1983). McMaster used Evette as an emissary to the business community and lawmakers of both parties. She told the Associated Press that this enabled the governor's office to double its potential footprint across the state.

In October 2019, Evette partnered with PalmettoPride on a statewide anti-litter initiative. Later that month, she was uninjured in a car collision near Greer, South Carolina, when her driver used the SUV's blue lights to go through an intersection; the driver was cited for failure to obey a traffic signal. The following year, Evette served as chair of the South Carolina Governor's Complete Count Commission for the 2020 Census and joined the SC7 Expedition in July to raise awareness of floodwater prevention.

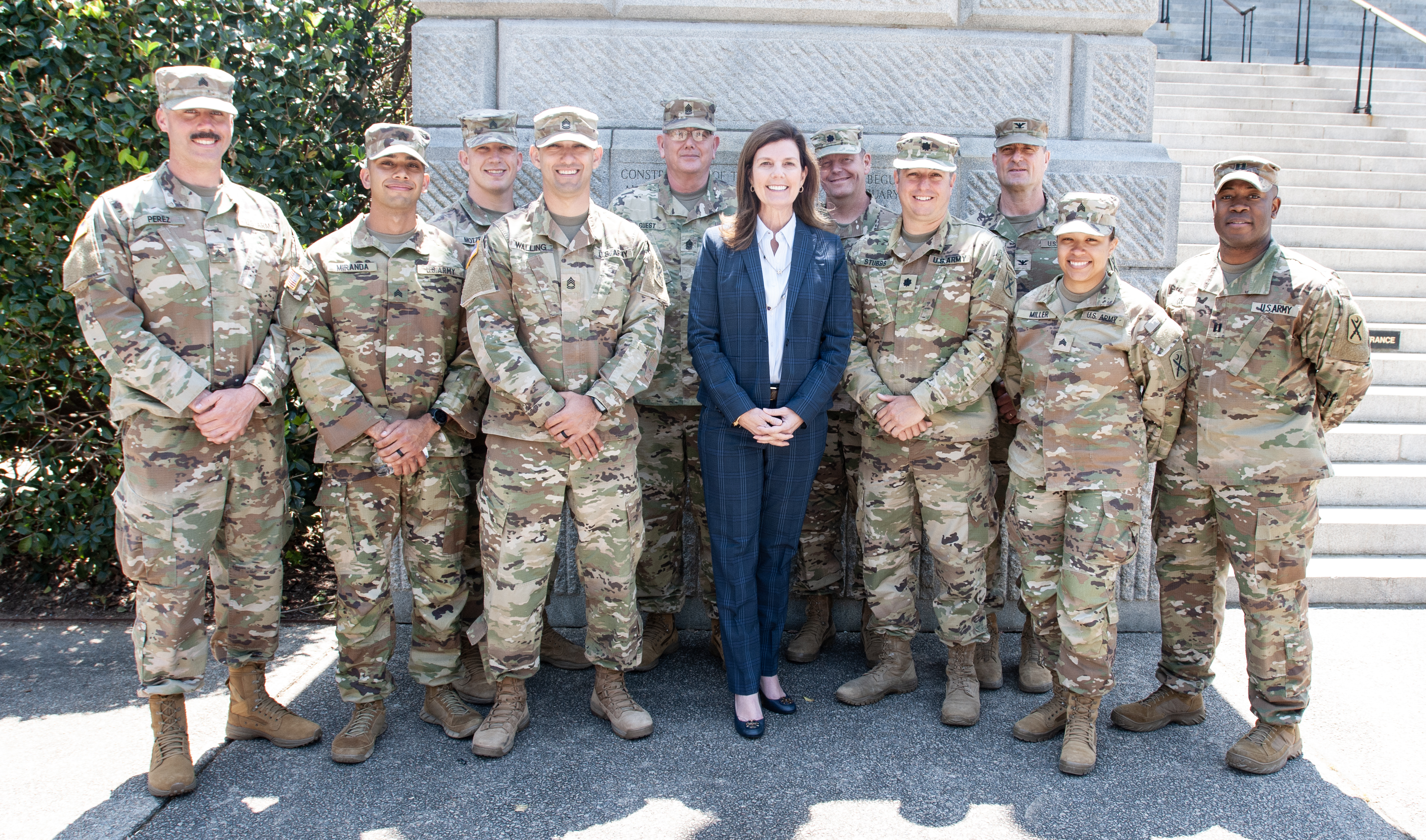
Evette with US Army Headquarters Support Company, 218th Maneuver Enhancement Brigade, South Carolina, 2023

In November 2022, McMaster and Evette won reelection. Evette was scheduled to speak at a January 2023 rally supporting school choice at the state capitol. On December 15, 2023, McMaster underwent an outpatient heart procedure to correct paroxysmal atrial fibrillation, an intermittent irregular heartbeat. During periods like this, the South Carolina Constitution authorizes the lieutenant governor to take executive action in cases of emergency, if the governor is temporarily disabled. In February 2024, Evette advocated for the expansion of home visit programs for mothers and infants in South Carolina. On May 1, 2024, the S.C. Department of Employment and Workforce and Evette announced the "Empowering Tomorrow's Leaders" Youth Employment Initiative to promote the importance of youth employment and to create a job board made for teenagers. Alongside Governor McMaster, Evette co-hosted events to aid South Carolinians impacted by the aftermath of Hurricane Helene. Evette chaired the National Lieutenant Governors Association for 2025–2026, succeeding Michigan lieutenant governor Garlin Gilchrist.

=== 2026 gubernatorial campaign ===
On July 14, 2025, Evette announced her candidacy for governor of South Carolina in 2026. An early supporter of the Donald Trump 2024 presidential campaign, Evette was endorsed by Trump on May 29, 2026, less than two weeks before the primary. In the first round of the Republican primary, Evette placed first but lacked the outright majority necessary to win.

She and state Attorney General Alan Wilson advanced to a runoff. Despite his earlier endorsement of Evette, Trump declared endorsements for both candidates ahead of the runoff. On June 23, she lost the runoff.

== Political positions ==
Evette is a supporter of President Donald Trump and has frequently criticized other Republicans for what she calls inadequate support of Trump's attempts to overturn the 2020 presidential election. Evette supported attempts to redistrict South Carolina's congressional map before the 2026 United States elections.

== Personal life ==
Evette married David Evette on July 30, 2005. They have three children and reside in Travelers Rest, South Carolina. Evette and her husband attend Prince of Peace Catholic Church in Taylors, South Carolina.

== Electoral history ==
2018 South Carolina gubernatorial election
Party	Candidate	Votes	%
Republican	Henry McMaster; Pamela Evette	921,342	54.0
Democratic	James Smith; Mandy Powers Norrell	784,182	45.9
Write-in		2,045	0.1
Total votes		1,707,569	100.0

2022 South Carolina gubernatorial election
Party	Candidate	Votes	%
Republican	Henry McMaster; Pamela Evette	988,501	58.0
Democratic	Joe Cunningham; Tally Parham Casey	692,691	40.7
Libertarian	Bruce Reeves; Jessica Ethridge	20,826	1.2
Write-in		1,174	0.1
Total votes		1,703,192	100.0

2026 South Carolina gubernatorial election Republican primary
Party	Candidate	Votes	%
Republican	Pamela Evette	136,480	28.9
Republican	Alan Wilson	123,643	26.1
Republican	Ralph Norman	80,790	17.1
Republican	Rom Reddy	66,992	14.2
Republican	Nancy Mace	57,380	12.1
Republican	Josh Kimbrell (withdrawn)	3,957	0.8
Republican	Jacqueline DuBose (decertified)	3,714	0.8
Total votes		472,956	100.0

2026 South Carolina gubernatorial election Republican primary runoff
Party	Candidate	Votes	%
Republican	Alan Wilson	218,569	68.6
Republican	Pamela Evette	100,227	31.4
Total votes		318,796	100.0

Party political offices
Preceded by Henry McMaster	Republican nominee for Lieutenant Governor of South Carolina; 2018, 2022	Succeeded by Mike Reichenbach
Political offices
Preceded by Kevin L. Bryant	Lieutenant Governor of South Carolina; 2019–present	Incumbent
