= 2018 South Carolina gubernatorial election =

- November 6, 2018
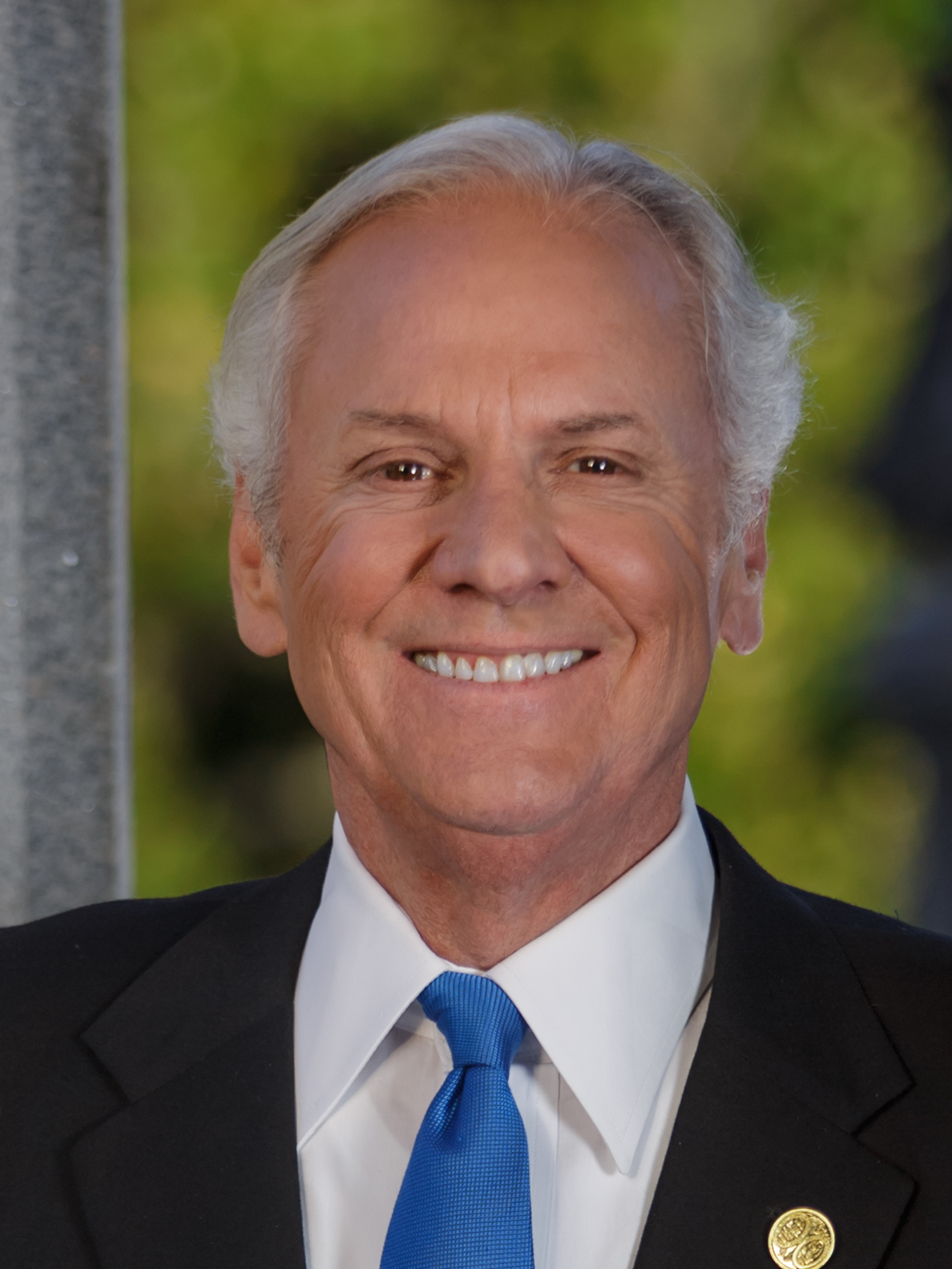

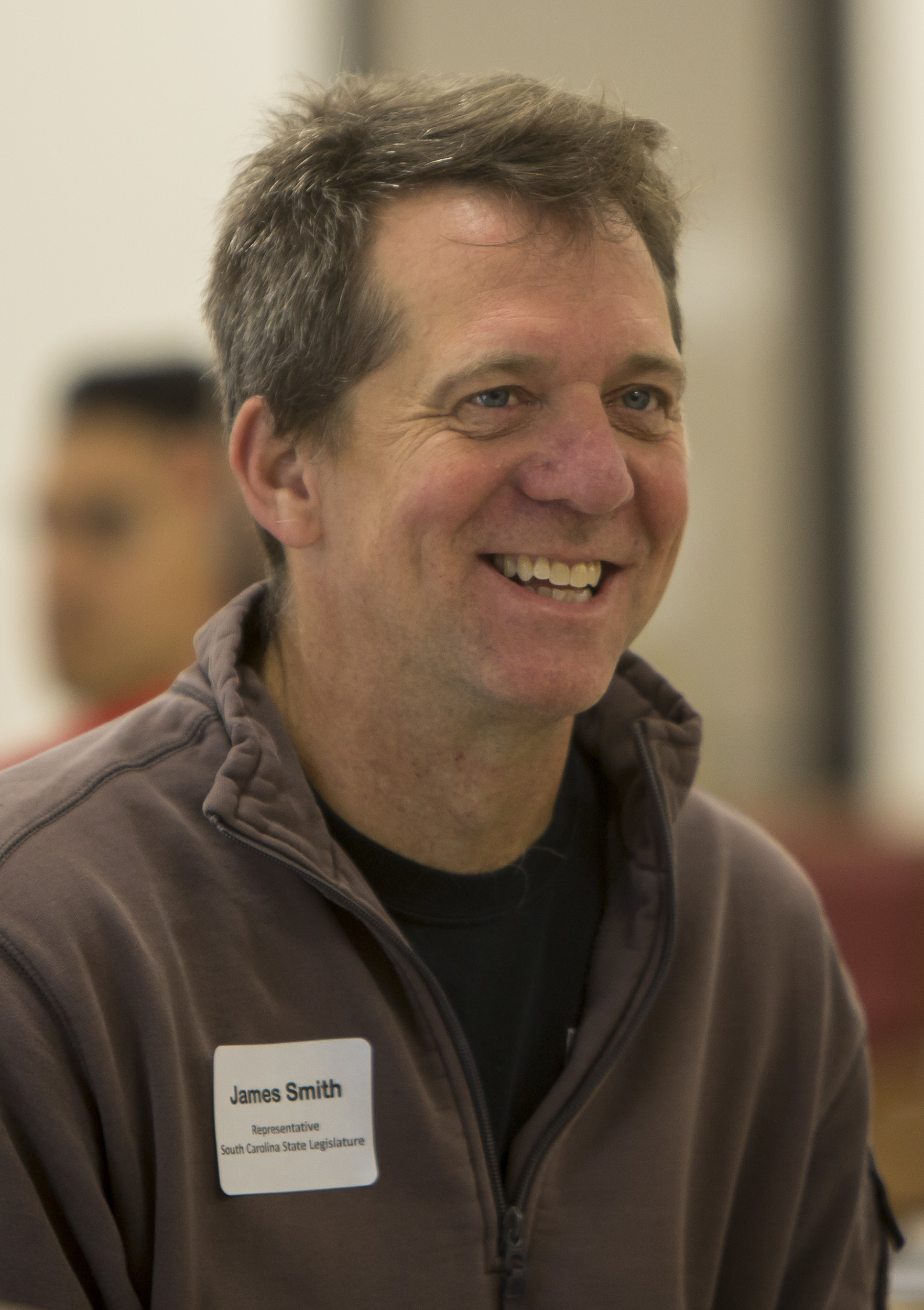
Nominee	Henry McMaster	James Smith
Party	Republican	Democratic
Running mate	Pamela Evette	Mandy Powers Norrell
Popular vote	921,342	784,182
Percentage	53.96%	45.92%
- McMaster: 50–60% 60–70% 70–80% 80–90% >90% Smith: 50–60% 60–70% 70–80% 80–90% >90%
Governor before election
Henry McMaster
Republican
Elected Governor
Henry McMaster
Republican

The 2018 South Carolina gubernatorial election was held on November 6, 2018, to elect the governor of South Carolina. Incumbent Republican Governor Henry McMaster, who took office after Nikki Haley resigned to become U.S. Ambassador to the United Nations, ran for election to a full term. The primary was held on June 12, with the Democrats nominating State Representative James E. Smith Jr. McMaster failed to win a majority of the vote, and then defeated John Warren in the Republican runoff on June 26. In the general election, McMaster defeated Smith, winning election to a full term.

Republicans won their fifth straight gubernatorial election in the state, their longest such streak in history.

== Republican primary ==
=== Candidates ===
==== Nominee ====
- Henry McMaster, incumbent governor
  - Running mate: Pamela Evette, businesswoman

==== Defeated in runoff ====
- John Warren, businessman
  - Running mate: Pat McKinney, businessman

==== Defeated in primary ====
- Kevin Bryant, incumbent lieutenant governor
- Yancey McGill, former Democratic lieutenant governor and former Democratic state senator
- Catherine Templeton, attorney, former director of the Department of Health and Environmental Control and former director of the Department of Labor, Licensing and Regulation
  - Running mate: Walt Wilkins III, Greenville County Solicitor

==== Declined ====
- Tom Davis, state senator
- Jeff Duncan, U.S. representative
- Mikee Johnson, businessman and former chairman of the South Carolina Chamber of Commerce (endorsed Catherine Templeton)
- Tim Scott, U.S. senator
- Joe Taylor, former South Carolina secretary of commerce
- Billy Wilkins, former chief judge of the United States Court of Appeals for the Fourth Circuit
- Alan Wilson, attorney general (ran for re-election)

=== Endorsements ===
Catherine Templeton

State figures

- Wes Climer, state senator
- Bobby Harrell, former Speaker of South Carolina House of Representatives
- Ralph Norman, member of the United States House of Representatives from South Carolina

Organizations

- Maggie's List
John Warren

State figures

- Elise Bidwell, member of South Carolina Educational Television Commission
- Kevin L. Bryant, 91st lieutenant governor of South Carolina and defeated candidate in gubernatorial Republican primary
- Tom Davis, state senator
- Pat McKinney, former chairman of the State Ports Authority, later chosen as Warren's running mate
- Ralph Norman, member of the United States House of Representatives from South Carolina
- Phil Robertson, star of Duck Dynasty
- Catherine Templeton, businesswoman and defeated candidate in gubernatorial Republican primary
- Knox H. White, mayor of Greenville

=== First round ===
==== Polling ====
Poll source	Date(s) administered	Sample size	Margin of error	Henry McMaster	Kevin Bryant	Yancey McGill	Catherine Templeton	John Warren	Other	Undecided
Fabrizio, Lee and Associates (R-Warren)	May 29–31, 2018	500	± 4.4%	33%	5%	2%	17%	19%	–	24%
Target-Insyght	May 29–31, 2018	400	± 5.0%	37%	4%	3%	25%	20%	–	11%
Target-Insyght	April 3–5, 2018	400	± 5.0%	46%	6%	4%	22%	1%	–	22%
TargetPoint/GQR	March 10–17, 2018	397	–	41%	5%	3%	10%	2%	–	35%
The Trafalgar Group (R)	November 29 – December 30, 2017	2,223	± 2.1%	40%	11%	3%	8%	–	10%	28%
Mason-Dixon	December 6–10, 2017	400	± 5.0%	51%	8%	1%	21%	–	–	19%
South Carolina Public Affairs	October 10–11, 2017	633	± 4.0%	33%	5%	5%	7%	–	–	50%

==== Debate ====
2018 South Carolina gubernatorial election Republican primary debate
No.	Date	Host	Moderator	Link	Republican	Republican	Republican	Republican	Republican
Key: P Participant A Absent N Not invited I Invited W Withdrawn									
Key: P Participant A Absent N Not invited I Invited W Withdrawn					Kevin Bryant	Henry McMaster	Yancey McGill	Catherine Templeton	John Warren
1	Jun. 6, 2018	The Post and Courier; South Carolina ETV; South Carolina Public Radio	Charles Bierbauer	YouTube	P	P	P	P	P

==== Results ====
Primary results by county: McMaster: McMaster—60–70%; McMaster—50–60%; McMaster—40–50%; McMaster—30–40%; Warren: Warren—30–40%; Warren—40–50%; Templeton: Templeton—40–50%; McGill: McGill—40–50%

Republican primary results
Party	Candidate	Votes	%
Republican	Henry McMaster (incumbent)	155,723	42.32%
Republican	John Warren	102,390	27.82%
Republican	Catherine Templeton	78,705	21.39%
Republican	Kevin Bryant	24,790	6.74%
Republican	Yancey McGill	6,375	1.73%
Total votes		367,983	100.00%

=== Runoff ===
==== Polling ====
Poll source	Date(s) administered	Sample size	Margin of error	Henry McMaster	John Warren	Undecided
The Trafalgar Group (R)	June 19–21, 2018	1,650	± 3.0%	54%	37%	9%
Fabrizio, Lee and Associates (R-Warren)	June 19–20, 2018	500	± 4.4%	42%	46%	13%
The Trafalgar Group (R)	June 13–14, 2018	1,000	± 3.0%	60%	31%	9%

==== Results ====
Primary runoff results by county: McMaster: McMaster—80–90%; McMaster—70–80%; McMaster—60–70%; McMaster—50–60%; Warren: Warren—50–60%; Warren—60–70%; Warren—70–80%

Republican primary runoff results
Party	Candidate	Votes	%
Republican	Henry McMaster (incumbent)	184,286	53.63%
Republican	John Warren	159,349	46.37%
Total votes		343,635	100.00%

== Democratic primary ==
=== Candidates ===
==== Nominee ====
- James Smith, state representative
  - Running mate: Mandy Powers Norrell, state representative

==== Defeated in primary ====
- Phil Noble, business and technology consultant and candidate for lieutenant governor in 1994
  - Running mate: Gloria Bromell Tinubu, former Atlanta, Georgia, city councilwoman, former Georgia state representative and nominee for SC-07 in 2012 and 2014
- Marguerite Willis, attorney
  - Running mate: John Scott, state senator

==== Declined ====
- Steve Benjamin, Mayor of Columbia
- Marlon Kimpson, state senator
- Inez Tenenbaum, former State Superintendent of Education, former chair of the Consumer Product Safety Commission and nominee for the U.S. Senate in 2004

=== Endorsements ===
Phil Noble
- Doug Jones, U.S. senator from Alabama

=== Polling ===
Poll source	Date(s) administered	Sample size	Margin of error	Phil Noble	James Smith	Marguerite Willis	Other	Undecided
Target-Insyght	April 3–5, 2018	400	± 5.0%	27%	27%	21%	–	25%
TargetPoint/GQR	March 10–17, 2018	296	–	7%	18%	11%	–	57%
The Trafalgar Group (R)	November 29 – December 30, 2017	2,223	± 2.1%	25%	20%	–	21%	34%

=== Debate ===
2018 South Carolina gubernatorial election Democratic primary debate
No.	Date	Host	Moderator	Link	Democratic	Democratic	Democratic
Key: P Participant A Absent N Not invited I Invited W Withdrawn							
Key: P Participant A Absent N Not invited I Invited W Withdrawn					Phil Noble	James Smith	Marguerite Willis
1	May 15, 2018	College of Charleston, WACH, WCIV-TV, WLOS, WMYA-TV & WPDE-TV	Tessa Spencer Adams	YouTube	P	P	P

=== Results ===
Primary results by county: Smith: Smith—70–80%; Smith—60–70%; Smith—50–60%; Smith—40–50%; Willis: Willis—40–50%

Democratic primary results
Party	Candidate	Votes	%
Democratic	James Smith	148,633	61.81%
Democratic	Marguerite Willis	66,248	27.55%
Democratic	Phil Noble	25,587	10.64%
Total votes		240,468	100.00%

== Independents and third parties ==
=== Declared ===
- Phil Cheney (Independent), former Anderson City Councilman, candidate for SC-03 in 2006 and write-in candidate for SC-05 in 2017

=== Failed nomination ===
- Martin Barry (American Party), medication researcher, nomination declined by the American Party
  - Running mate: James Cartee, theater director

== General election ==
=== Predictions ===
Source	Ranking	As of
The Cook Political Report	Likely R	October 26, 2018
The Washington Post	Likely R	November 5, 2018
FiveThirtyEight	Safe R	November 5, 2018
Rothenberg Political Report	Safe R	November 1, 2018
Sabato's Crystal Ball	Safe R	November 5, 2018
RealClearPolitics	Safe R	November 4, 2018
Daily Kos	Safe R	November 5, 2018
Fox News (Note: The Fox News Midterm Power Rankings uniquely does not contain a category for Safe/Solid races)	Likely R	November 5, 2018
Politico	Likely R	November 5, 2018
Governing	Likely R	November 5, 2018

=== Endorsements ===
Henry McMaster (R)

U.S. executive branch officials

- Mike Pence, 48th vice president of the United States
- Donald Trump, 45th president of The United States

State figures

- Kevin Brackett, South Carolina circuit solicitor
- Tom Rice, U.S. representative (SC-7)
- Katrina Shealy, state senator
- Scarlett Wilson, South Carolina circuit solicitor

Organizations

- NRA Political Victory Fund
- SC Citizens for Life

Newspapers

- The Post and Courier
James Smith (D)

Former U.S. executive branch officials

- Joe Biden, 47th vice president of the United States

U.S. senators

- Bernie Sanders, U.S. senator (I-VT)

U.S. representatives

- James Clyburn, U.S. representative (D-SC)

Local and statewide politicians

- Robert Barber, former state representative
- Steve Benjamin, current mayor of Columbia
- Floyd Breeland, former state representative
- Margie Bright Matthews, state senator
- Robert Brown, state representative
- Wendell Gilliard, state representative
- Jim Hodges, former governor of South Carolina
- Joe Jefferson, state representative
- Marlon Kimpson, state senator
- Marvin Pendarvis, state representative
- Vic Rawl, chairman of the Charleston County Council
- Joe Riley, former mayor of Charleston, SC
- Richard Riley, former United States Secretary of Education and former governor of South Carolina
- Leon Stavrinakis, state representative
- Mary Tinkler, Charleston County Treasurer and former state representative

Organizations

- Conservation Voters of South Carolina
- Our Revolution SC
- Planned Parenthood Action Fund
- Sierra Club South Carolina chapter
- South Carolina Equality
- VoteVets.org

=== Polling ===
Poll source	Date(s) administered	Sample size	Margin of error	Henry McMaster (R)	James Smith (D)	Undecided
The Trafalgar Group (R)	October 29–31, 2018	3,792	± 1.6%	54%	38%	8%
The Trafalgar Group (R)	October 12–14, 2018	4,830	± 2.1%	56%	32%	12%
The Trafalgar Group (R)	September 24 – October 2, 2018	2,692	± 1.9%	51%	37%	13%
The Tarrance Group (R-RGA)	August 11–13, 2018	601	± 4.1%	52%	41%	7%
Garin-Hart-Yang (D-Smith)	August 6–9, 2018	605	± 4.1%	47%	43%	10%

=== Results ===
South Carolina gubernatorial election, 2018
Party	Candidate	Votes	%	±%
Republican	Henry McMaster (incumbent)	921,342	53.96%	−1.94%
Democratic	James Smith	784,182	45.92%	+4.50%
Write-in		2,045	0.12%	+0.05%
Total votes		1,707,569	100.00%	N/A
Republican hold				

==== By county ====
County	Henry McMaster Republican		James Smith Democratic		Various candidates Other parties		Margin		Total
County	#	%	#	%	#	%	#	%	Total
Abbeville	5,451	63.6%	3,113	36.3%	8	0.1%	2,338	27.3%	8,572
Aiken	36,801	61.7%	22,754	38.2%	57	0.1%	14,047	23.5%	59,612
Allendale	608	21.0%	2,289	79.0%	1	0.0%	-1,681	-58.0%	2,898
Anderson	43,412	69.0%	19,386	30.8%	95	0.2%	24,026	38.2%	62,893
Bamberg	1,552	35.4%	2,828	64.5%	2	0.0%	-1,276	-29.1%	4,382
Barnwell	3,734	51.2%	3,549	48.7%	6	0.1%	185	2.5%	7,289
Beaufort	38,399	54.5%	31,971	45.4%	63	0.1%	6,428	9.1%	70,433
Berkeley	35,107	53.5%	30,452	46.4%	110	0.2%	4,655	7.1%	65,669
Calhoun	2,952	49.6%	2,990	50.3%	6	0.1%	-38	-0.7%	5,948
Charleston	62,642	42.5%	84,634	57.4%	175	0.1%	-21,992	-14.9%	147,451
Cherokee	11,730	70.2%	4,964	29.7%	17	0.1%	6,766	40.5%	16,711
Chester	5,665	52.1%	5,195	47.8%	3	0.0%	470	4.3%	10,863
Chesterfield	6,730	56.2%	5,241	43.8%	6	0.1%	1,489	12.4%	11,977
Clarendon	5,722	47.3%	6,365	52.6%	3	0.0%	-643	-5.3%	12,090
Colleton	6,891	52.1%	6,321	47.8%	14	0.1%	570	4.3%	13,226
Darlington	11,871	50.9%	11,436	49.0%	8	0.1%	435	1.9%	23,315
Dillon	4,052	49.5%	4,141	50.5%	1	0.0%	-89	-1.0%	8,194
Dorchester	27,563	54.2%	23,275	45.7%	58	0.1%	4,288	8.5%	50,896
Edgefield	5,636	60.0%	3,747	39.9%	9	0.1%	1,889	20.1%	9,392
Fairfield	3,409	36.7%	5,865	63.2%	5	0.1%	-2,456	-26.5%	9,279
Florence	22,947	50.4%	22,533	49.5%	36	0.1%	414	0.9%	45,516
Georgetown	14,083	54.5%	11,760	45.4%	15	0.1%	2,323	9.1%	25,858
Greenville	102,195	57.9%	74,007	41.9%	369	0.2%	28,188	16.0%	176,571
Greenwood	13,973	60.4%	9,140	39.5%	34	0.1%	4,833	20.9%	23,147
Hampton	2,558	38.6%	4,051	61.2%	15	0.2%	-1,493	-22.6%	6,624
Horry	71,985	65.1%	38,574	34.9%	79	0.1%	33,411	30.2%	110,638
Jasper	4,346	46.4%	5,002	53.4%	12	0.1%	-656	-7.0%	9,360
Kershaw	13,881	59.1%	9,588	40.8%	28	0.1%	4,293	18.3%	23,497
Lancaster	19,554	59.5%	13,297	40.4%	21	0.1%	6,257	19.1%	32,872
Laurens	12,899	63.4%	7,415	36.4%	34	0.2%	5,484	27.0%	20,348
Lee	2,174	34.1%	4,190	65.8%	4	0.1%	-2,016	-31.7%	6,368
Lexington	62,544	62.8%	36,854	37.0%	153	0.2%	25,690	25.8%	99,551
Marion	3,963	38.0%	6,450	61.9%	8	0.1%	-2,487	-23.9%	10,421
Marlboro	3,166	40.8%	4,594	59.1%	7	0.1%	-1,428	-18.3%	7,767
McCormick	2,327	52.5%	2,103	47.5%	1	0.0%	224	5.0%	4,431
Newberry	7,644	58.7%	5,374	41.2%	12	0.1%	2,270	17.5%	13,030
Oconee	19,599	71.1%	7,945	28.8%	38	0.1%	11,654	42.3%	27,582
Orangeburg	9,222	30.1%	21,402	69.8%	19	0.1%	-12,180	-39.7%	30,643
Pickens	28,139	72.9%	10,393	26.9%	82	0.2%	17,746	46.0%	38,614
Richland	41,793	29.5%	99,476	70.3%	169	0.1%	-57,683	-40.8%	141,438
Saluda	4,516	65.7%	2,356	34.3%	4	0.1%	2,160	31.4%	6,876
Spartanburg	58,442	61.6%	36,264	38.2%	168	0.2%	22,178	23.4%	94,874
Sumter	14,578	42.3%	19,830	57.6%	18	0.1%	-5,252	-15.3%	34,426
Union	5,208	58.2%	3,728	41.7%	7	0.1%	1,480	16.5%	8,943
Williamsburg	3,774	32.7%	7,769	67.2%	11	0.1%	-3,995	-34.5%	11,554
York	55,905	58.5%	39,571	41.4%	54	0.1%	16,334	17.1%	95,530
Totals	921,342	53.96%	784,182	45.92%	2,045	0.12%	137,160	8.04%	1,707,569

Counties that flipped from Democratic to Republican

- Darlington (largest city: Hartsville)

==== By congressional district ====
McMaster won six of seven congressional districts, including one that elected a Democratic representative.

District	McMaster	Smith	Representative
1st	52%	48%	Mark Sanford
1st	52%	48%	Joe Cunningham
2nd	54%	46%	Joe Wilson
3rd	67%	33%	Jeff Duncan
4th	59%	41%	Trey Gowdy
4th	59%	41%	William Timmons
5th	57%	43%	Ralph Norman
6th	30%	70%	Jim Clyburn
7th	57%	43%	Tom Rice

== See also ==
- 2018 South Carolina elections
