= Catherine Templeton =

American politician (born 1970)

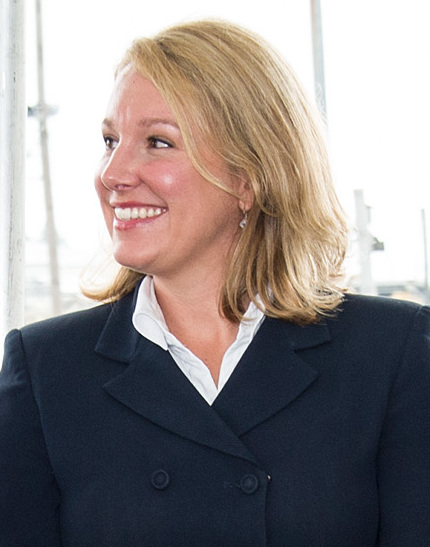

Director of the South Carolina Department of Health and Environmental Control
- In office March 28, 2012 – January 12, 2015
- Governor: Nikki Haley
- Preceded by: Earl Hunter
- Succeeded by: Catherine Heigel

Director of the South Carolina Department of Labor, Licensing, and Regulation
- In office January 13, 2011 – March 28, 2012
- Governor: Nikki Haley
- Preceded by: Adrienne Riggins Youmans
- Succeeded by: Holly Gillespie Pisarik

Personal details
- Born: Catherine Brawley; December 7, 1970 (age 55) Lexington, South Carolina, U.S.
- Party: Republican
- Spouse(s): Patrick John Bowers (August 4, 1996 - ?), Morgan Templeton (2001–present)
- Children: 3
- Education: Wofford College (BA); University of South Carolina (JD)
- Website: Official website

Catherine Templeton is an American attorney and political figure from South Carolina. She was a candidate for the Republican nomination for governor of South Carolina in the 2018 election. Templeton is the former President of US Brick and the former Director of the South Carolina Department of Labor, Licensing, and Regulation in the Cabinet of Governor Nikki Haley.

== Early life and education ==
Catherine was born on December 7, 1970. She grew up in Lexington, South Carolina, and graduated from Irmo High School in 1989. She attended the University of Antwerp and graduated with a B.A. in political economics and philosophy from Wofford College in 1993. Templeton worked for Roger Milliken and then earned a Juris Doctor in 1998 from the University of South Carolina School of Law.

== Career ==
After law school, Templeton took a position with the law firm Ogletree Deakins where she specialized in union avoidance and advised Fortune 500 companies. Templeton's private sector career was notable for her involvement in fighting labor unions, most notably as the only woman involved in three successful defeats of the historic United Auto Workers drive on Nissan in Smyrna, Tennessee in the late 1990s.

In 2009, Templeton got involved in a national education effort with retired United States Supreme Court Justice Sandra Day O'Connor designed to increase civics knowledge among middle school students about the way government works. Initially, Templeton was the South Carolina pilot co-chair for Our Courts, but the program expanded its scope and its reach to all 50 states and became iCivics and Templeton was named by the Justice as the National Volunteer Coordinator. In October 2010, O'Connor recommended Templeton for a judgeship.

== South Carolina Director of Labor, Licensing, and Regulation ==
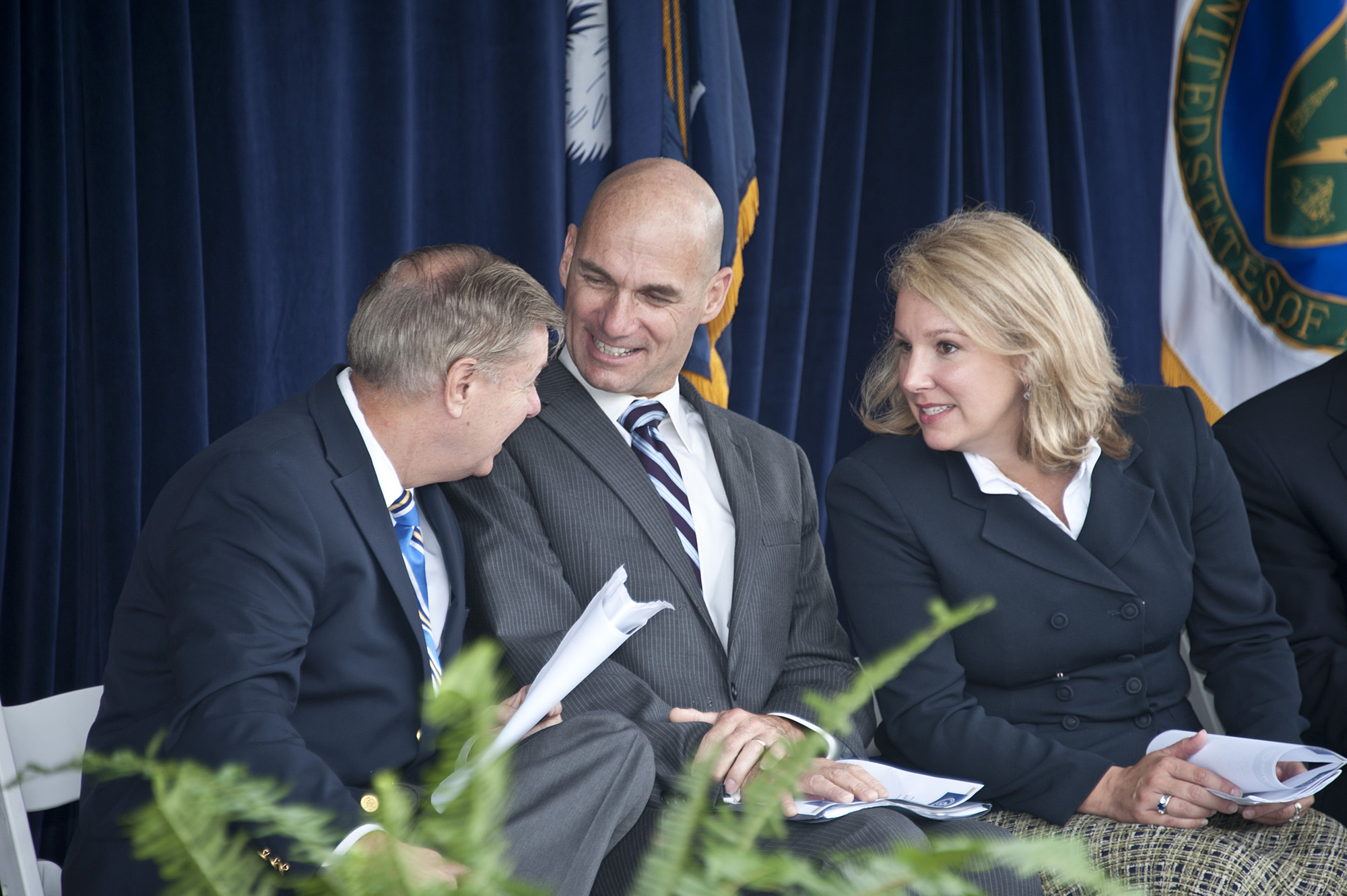
Templeton with U.S. Senator Lindsey Graham and Thomas P. D'Agostino

In 2010, Governor Nikki Haley asked Templeton to join then Governor-elect Haley's Cabinet as Secretary of Labor. Templeton had voted for Democratic State Senator Vincent Sheheen for governor in 2010 over then-State Representative Haley. In 2012, Governor Nikki Haley appointed Templeton to the Director's position at the South Carolina Department of Health and Environmental Control. On December 8, 2010, Governor-elect Nikki R. Haley appointed Templeton to be the South Carolina Director of Labor, Licensing, and Regulation (LLR). Haley and Templeton were subsequently sued by the AFL-CIO in federal court. That case was dismissed in favor of Haley and Templeton. Additionally, the National Labor Relations Board filed a Charge against Templeton in April 2011, that was subsequently dismissed.

Templeton cut staffing for the state's immigration enforcement program from more than 20 to three while head of the LLR. In 2011, Templeton halted the LLR audit program that checked whether S.C. employers were verifying the legal immigration status of new hires by implementing a state-wide EVerify requirement.

== South Carolina Department of Health and Environmental Control ==
In 2012, Templeton was selected by the South Carolina DHEC board to be director at the agency. She was confirmed as Director on February 28, 2012. In her first two months as director, Templeton "cut a swath through personnel and agency practices, raising hackles in the General Assembly." Templeton laid off nine agency staffers while creating "three high-dollar executive positions, a move that exasperated anti-tax supporters who expected her to cut costs."

As DHEC director, Templeton proposed a series of restrictions on food stamps, suggesting that the state should strictly limit the kinds of foods that could be purchased using food stamps. Templeton framed the proposal as an anti-obesity measure. The trial balloon received "plenty of feedback, both positive and negative"; the South Carolina Beverage Association objected to proposals to bar use of food stamps for sugary beverages.

Templeton was director of DHEC during the Ebola virus cases in the United States in 2014. As director, Templeton tested Ebola emergency response protocols at Charleston hospitals.

Templeton's employment as director of DHEC ended effective January 12, 2015.

After her termination as director of the state's health and environmental agency, Templeton was paid $124,000 for five months' work as a consultant for two state agencies. The directors of those state agencies at the time are among Templeton's gubernatorial campaign contributors.

=== Environment and Savannah River site ===
Templeton was responsible for South Carolina's "unusual display of resistance" and threatened to impose a $154M fine on the federal government for failing to meet its responsibilities at the Savannah River site.

== Politics ==
In 2012, after Senator Jim DeMint resigned from the United States Senate to become president of The Heritage Foundation, Templeton was placed on a short list of possible appointees to fill his remainder of his term, along with Senator Tim Scott, Congressman Trey Gowdy, and former First Lady of South Carolina Jenny Sanford.

Templeton was summoned to Trump Tower to meet with President-elect Donald Trump when he was picking his cabinet, but she turned down a job in the U.S. Department of Labor. When Trump's initial nominee, Andrew Puzder, withdrew from consideration, Templeton was one of four people who were considered for the post.

=== 2018 gubernatorial election ===
See: 2018 South Carolina gubernatorial election

In April 2017, Templeton announced her candidacy for the Republican nomination for governor in 2018. In 2018, she invited Walt Wilkins III to be her running mate.

In early August 2017, Templeton attracted controversy when she stated at a campaign event in Pickens County, "I am proud of the Confederacy," while also saying that she supports the General Assembly's decision in 2015, following the Charleston church shooting, to remove the Confederate battle flag from the grounds of the South Carolina State Capitol. Templeton also vowed, if elected governor, not to allow the removal of any Confederate monument in the state.

On the campaign trail, Templeton said that she opposed drilling off the coast of South Carolina. Templeton took an anti-abortion position, saying that abortion should only be legal in cases of incest or when the woman's life was endangered by the pregnancy.

On June 12, 2018, Templeton placed third in the gubernatorial Republican Primary, receiving 21.4% of the votes. After her defeat, she endorsed businessman John Warren.

South Carolina Gubernatiorial Primary (Republican), 2018
| Candidate | Votes | % |
| Henry McMaster | 155,072 | 42.3 |
| John Warren | 102,006 | 27.8 |
| Catherine Templeton | 78,432 | 21.4 |
| Kevin L. Bryant | 24,699 | 6.7 |
| Yancey McGill | 6,349 | 1.7 |

== US Brick ==
After serving in state government, Catherine co-founded US Brick, one of the largest brick manufacturers in the United States.

== Awards and distinctions ==
In 2014, Templeton was awarded the Defender of Manufacturing Award by the South Carolina Manufacturers Alliance.

In 2010, Templeton was awarded the Compleat Lawyer Award of the South Carolina School of Law.

While in state government, Templeton was Chair of the State Emergency Response Committee and was appointed by Governor Haley to the Savannah River Maritime Commission.

== Personal life ==
Templeton is the mother of three children, including twins, and is married to Morgan Templeton, a business lawyer in private practice. They attend St. Michael's Church. Her volunteer work includes board positions with the Junior League, Gibbes Museum of Art Women's Council, the Boy Scouts of America, and the Garden Club of Charleston, Parents' Association President at First (Scots) Presbyterian Kindergarten, and Sunday School Coordinator at St. Michael's Church.
