= Phil Noble =

American entrepreneur (born 1951)

Phil Noble Jr.
- Born: May 17, 1951 (age 75); Greenville, South Carolina, U.S.
- Education: Birmingham-Southern College (BSc)
- Occupations: Entrepreneur, political consultant, nonprofit innovator
- Known for: Palmetto Project, PoliticsOnline, World Class Scholars

Phil Noble Jr. (born May 17, 1951) is an American entrepreneur, political consultant, and civic sector technology innovator. He is recognized for pioneering innovations in political campaigns, media, education, and nonprofit initiatives in the United States and globally. Over his career, he has founded or co-founded 12X start up NGOs and companies including the Palmetto Project, PoliticsOnline, and World Class Scholars.

== Early life and education ==
Noble was born in Greenville, South Carolina, the son of Rev. J. Phillips Noble, a Presbyterian minister and civil rights leader. Rev. Noble played a prominent role in desegregation efforts in Alabama during the 1960s and was targeted by the Ku Klux Klan for his activism.

Noble graduated from Tennessee Military Institute in 1969 and then worked in President Lyndon B. Johnson's War on Poverty program before earning a BSc from Birmingham-Southern College in 1974. He also pursued independent study at Cambridge University and graduate work at Stockholm University.

== Career ==
Over the next 30 years, Noble worked on more than 350 political and public affairs projects across 40 U.S. states and in more than 35 countries, including campaigns for 25 heads of state and 35 national political parties. He was recognized as "International Consultant of the Year" by the American Association of Political Consultants and the Latin American Association of Political Consultants.

In 1998, he founded PoliticsOnline, one of the first companies to integrate the internet into politics and advocacy. The firm created some of the earliest online fundraising and campaign tools for politics and nonprofit organizations and was later recognized by The Wall Street Journal for its influence on modern campaigning.

He also served as a Resident Fellow at the Harvard Kennedy School's Institute of Politics and lectured at over 25 universities worldwide.

== Nonprofit Initiatives ==
=== Palmetto Project ===
Noble founded the Palmetto Project in 1985 as a social entrepreneurial vehicle to address systemic challenges in South Carolina related to education, health care, race relations, and civic engagement. Under his leadership:

- The organization launched the state's first free community-based health provider and pharmaceutical initiative that has benefited over two million people.
- Piloted innovative voter registration modernization efforts still referenced and in use today.
- Developed numerous award-winning public-private partnerships aimed at reducing infant mortality, improving local race relations, and expanding broadband access.

Since its founding, the Palmetto Project has started more than 330 public-private partnerships and received national recognition from the Points of Light Foundation under President George H. W. Bush and the Corporation for National Service under President Bill Clinton.

=== One Laptop Per Child – South Carolina (OLPC-SC) ===
After working with the global OLPC organization at the MIT Media Lab, Noble launched One Laptop Per Child – South Carolina, making South Carolina the first U.S. state to adapt OLPC's international model. Through a partnership with the SC Department of Education, Palmetto Project, and donors such as BlueCross BlueShield:

- The program distributed 500 XO laptops in its initial Marion County pilot in 2008.
- Expanded to 2,300 laptops across 14 public schools by 2009.
- Introduced a student "pledge of greatness," encouraging young users to "try to do something great" with the laptop and their educational opportunity.

Noble led the coalition that secured public and private funding and oversaw statewide technology implementation that was later merged into the state's growing ed-tech operations. The program was cited as a national model for bridging the digital divide in underserved communities.

=== World Class Scholars ===
Noble founded World Class Scholars (WCS), a nonprofit education platform that connects classrooms across more than 100 countries through virtual exchange and collaborative projects. Launched at Expo 2020 Dubai in partnership with Microsoft, the program is free. It established its first physical "Global Classroom" in partnership with the Al-Futtaim Education Foundation in 2023 serving over 20,000 students a year in Dubai as a global model. In 2025, WCS was named to the inaugural Global EdTech Prize Top 30 shortlist in the Non-Profit category by T4 Education.

== Writing and Commentary ==
Noble wrote a long-running weekly opinion column distributed through the South Carolina Press Association and published in more than 40 state newspapers.

== South Carolina Politics and Personal life ==
Noble was President of the South Carolina Democratic Leadership Council and in 1994, he was a candidate for lieutenant governor and in 2018 for governor. He lives in Charleston, South Carolina, with his wife Nancy Madden. They have two adult children, J.P. and Lizzie.
