= 2026 United States attorney general elections =

- November 3, 2026

33 attorney general offices 30 states; 2 territories; 1 federal district (Note: Seat tallies and popular vote do not include states that do not elect attorneys general or territorial attorneys general.)
	Majority party	Minority party
Party	Democratic	Republican
Seats before	20	23
Seats after	25	18
Seat change	▲5	▼5
Seats up	16	14
Seats won	21	9
- Republican hold Democratic hold Democratic gain Nonpartisan; No election

The 2026 United States attorney general elections were held on November 3, 2026, to elect the attorneys general of thirty U.S. states, two territories, and one federal district. The previous elections for this group of states took place in 2022, while Vermont's attorney general was elected in 2024.

These elections will take place concurrently with various other federal, state, and local elections.

== Partisan composition ==
Going into the election, there are 23 Republican attorneys general and 20 Democratic attorneys general in the United States. This class of attorneys general is made up of 16 Democrats and 14 Republicans. Democrats are defending four attorneys general in states that Donald Trump won in 2024 (Arizona, Michigan, Nevada, and Wisconsin), while there are no states with Republican attorneys general which Kamala Harris won.

== Retirements ==
Map of retirements: Republican incumbent ran Democratic incumbent ran Republican incumbent term-limited or retired Democratic incumbent term-limited Nonpartisan No election

12 incumbent attorneys general (7 Republican, 4 Democratic, and 1 Nonpartisan) are retiring. 6 incumbent attorneys general (4 Democrats and 2 Republicans) are term-limited. 6 incumbent attorneys general (5 Republicans and 1 Nonpartisan) have announced they are not seeking reelection.

=== Democratic ===
1. Colorado: Phil Weiser is term-limited after 2 terms.
2. Michigan: Dana Nessel is term-limited after 2 terms.
3. Nevada: Aaron Ford is term-limited after 2 terms.
4. Rhode Island: Peter Neronha is term-limited after 2 terms.

=== Republican ===
1. Alabama: Steve Marshall is term-limited after 2 full terms.
2. Georgia: Chris Carr retired to run for governor.
3. Ohio: Dave Yost after being elected to 2 terms, resigned in June 2026. Governor of Ohio Mike DeWine appointed Public Safety director Andy Wilson to finish Yost's term. Wilson was appointed after the primaries for attorney general had already concluded so he did not seek a full term.
4. Oklahoma: Gentner Drummond retired to run for governor.
5. South Carolina: Alan Wilson retired to run for governor.
6. South Dakota: Marty Jackley retired to run for U.S. House.
7. Texas: Ken Paxton retired to run for U.S. Senate.

=== Nonpartisan ===
1. Northern Mariana Islands: Edward Manibusan is retiring.

== Predictions ==
At the start of the election cycle, very few elections were considered competitive, with the vast majority of competitive races coming from Democratic-held offices in presidential battleground states. As the election cycle progressed, a number of these elections moved in Democrats' favor, while races in more Republican-leaning states, such as Kansas and Iowa, began to be seen as competitive.

Several sites and individuals published predictions of competitive seats. These predictions looked at factors such as the strength of the incumbent (if the incumbent was running for reelection) and the other candidates, and the state's partisan lean (reflected in part by the state's Cook Partisan Voting Index rating). The predictions assigned ratings to each seat, indicating the predicted advantage that a party had in winning that seat. Most election predictors used:

- "tossup": no advantage
- "lean": slight advantage
- "likely": significant, but surmountable, advantage
- "safe": near-certain chance of victory

Constituency		Incumbent		Ratings	Result
State	PVI	Attorney general	Last election (Note: The last elections for this group of attorneys general, with the exception of Vermont, were in 2022, except for those who became attorney general after their predecessor's resignation.)	Sabato Oct. 29, 2026	Result
Alabama	R+15	Steve Marshall (term-limited)	67.90% R	Safe R	TBD
Arizona	R+2	Kris Mayes	49.94% D	Lean D	TBD
Arkansas	R+15	Tim Griffin	67.61% R	Safe R	TBD
California	D+12	Rob Bonta	59.08% D	Safe D	TBD
Colorado	D+6	Phil Weiser (term-limited)	54.70% D	Safe D	TBD
Connecticut	D+8	William Tong	57.07% D	Safe D	TBD
Delaware	D+8	Kathy Jennings	53.83% D	Safe D	TBD
Florida	R+5	James Uthmeier	Appointed (2025) (Note: Incumbent Republican Ashley Moody resigned from this post after being appointed to the senate, after Marco Rubio's resignation)	Lean R	TBD
Georgia	R+1	Christopher M. Carr (retiring)	51.86% R	Tossup	TBD
Idaho	R+18	Raúl Labrador	62.62% R	Safe R	TBD
Illinois	D+6	Kwame Raoul	54.35% D	Safe D	TBD
Iowa	R+6	Brenna Bird	50.82% R	Tossup	TBD
Kansas	R+8	Kris Kobach	50.80% R	Lean R	TBD
Maryland	D+15	Anthony Brown	64.95% D	Safe D	TBD
Massachusetts	D+14	Andrea Campbell	62.85% D	Safe D	TBD
Michigan	EVEN	Dana Nessel (term-limited)	53.16% D	Tossup	TBD
Minnesota	D+3	Keith Ellison	50.37% DFL	Tossup	TBD
Nebraska	R+10	Mike Hilgers	69.73% R	Safe R	TBD
Nevada	R+1	Aaron D. Ford (term-limited)	52.25% D	Lean D	TBD
New Mexico	D+4	Raúl Torrez	55.31% D	Safe D	TBD
New York	D+8	Letitia James	54.63% D	Safe D	TBD
North Dakota	R+18	Drew Wrigley	70.94% R	Safe R	TBD
Ohio	R+5	Dave Yost (term-limited)	60.13% R	Lean R	TBD
Oklahoma	R+17	Gentner Drummond (retiring)	73.76% R	Safe R	TBD
Rhode Island	D+8	Peter Neronha (term-limited)	61.49% D	Safe D	TBD
South Carolina	R+8	Alan Wilson (retiring)	97.32% R (Note: Wilson ran unopposed in 2022)	Safe R	TBD
South Dakota	R+15	Marty Jackley (retiring)	100.0% R (Note: Jackley ran unopposed in 2022)	Safe R	TBD
Texas	R+6	Ken Paxton (retiring)	53.42% R	Likely R	TBD
Vermont	D+17	Charity Clark	57.82% D	Safe D	TBD
Wisconsin	EVEN	Josh Kaul	50.64% D	Lean D	TBD

== Race summary ==
=== States ===
State	Attorney general	Party	First elected	Last race	Status	Candidates
Alabama	Steve Marshall	Republican	2017 (Note: Marshall took office after his predecessor, Luther Strange, resigned. He was subsequently elected in 2018.)	68.0% R	Incumbent term-limited. Republican hold.	▌ ✓ Katherine Robertson (Republican); ▌Jeff McLaughlin (Democratic)
Arizona	Kris Mayes	Democratic	2022	50.0% D	Incumbent re-elected.	▌ ✓ Kris Mayes (Democratic); ▌Warren Petersen (Republican)
Arkansas	Tim Griffin	Republican	2022	67.6% R	Incumbent re-elected.	▌ ✓ Tim Griffin (Republican)
California	Rob Bonta	Democratic	2021 (Note: Bonta took office after his predecessor, Xavier Becerra, resigned. He was subsequently elected in 2022.)	59.1% D	Incumbent re-elected.	▌ ✓ Rob Bonta (Democratic); ▌Michael Gates (Republican)
Colorado	Phil Weiser	Democratic	2018	54.7% D	Incumbent term-limited. Democratic hold.	▌ ✓ Jena Griswold (Democratic); ▌Michael Allen (Republican)
Connecticut	William Tong	Democratic	2018	57.0% D	Incumbent re-elected.	▌ ✓ William Tong (Democratic); ▌John Bolton (Republican)
Delaware	Kathy Jennings	Democratic	2018	53.8% D	Incumbent re-elected.	▌ ✓ Kathy Jennings (Democratic); ▌Dave Graham (Republican)
Florida	James Uthmeier	Republican	2025 (Note: Uthmeier was appointed to the position after his predecessor, Ashley Moody, was appointed to the U.S. Senate.)	Appointed (Note: Uthmeier's predecessor Moody was re-elected with 60.6% of the vote in 2022.)	Interim appointee elected.	▌ ✓ James Uthmeier (Republican); ▌José Javier Rodríguez (Democratic)
Georgia	Chris Carr	Republican	2016 (Note: Carr took office after his predecessor, Sam Olens, resigned. He was subsequently elected in 2018.)	51.9% R	Incumbent retired to run for governor. Democratic gain.	▌ ✓ Tanya Miller (Democratic); ▌Brian Strickland (Republican)
Idaho	Raúl Labrador	Republican	2022	62.6% R	Incumbent re-elected.	▌ ✓ Raúl Labrador (Republican); ▌Lori Hickman (Democratic)
Illinois	Kwame Raoul	Democratic	2018	54.4% D	Incumbent re-elected.	▌ ✓ Kwame Raoul (Democratic); ▌Bob Fioretti (Republican)
Iowa	Brenna Bird	Republican	2022	50.9% R	Incumbent lost re-election. Democratic gain.	▌ ✓ Nathan Willems (Democratic); ▌Brenna Bird (Republican)
Kansas	Kris Kobach	Republican	2022	50.8% R	Incumbent lost re-election. Democratic gain.	▌ ✓ Chris Mann (Democratic); ▌Kris Kobach (Republican)
Maryland	Anthony Brown	Democratic	2022	65.0% D	Incumbent re-elected.	▌ ✓ Anthony Brown (Democratic); ▌James Rutledge III (Republican)
Massachusetts	Andrea Campbell	Democratic	2022	62.6% D	Incumbent re-elected.	▌ ✓ Andrea Campbell (Democratic); ▌Michael Walsh (Republican)
Michigan	Dana Nessel	Democratic	2018	53.2% D	Incumbent term-limited. Democratic hold.	▌ ✓ Eli Savit (Democratic); ▌Doug Lloyd (Republican); ▌Jason Dye (Libertarian); ▌John Ludtke Jr. (U.S. Taxpayers); ▌Jeff Polonowski (Green); ▌Doug Dern (Natural Law)
Minnesota	Keith Ellison	DFL	2018	50.4% DFL	Incumbent re-elected.	▌ ✓ Keith Ellison (Democratic); ▌Ron Schutz (Republican)
Nebraska	Mike Hilgers	Republican	2022	69.7% R	Incumbent re-elected.	▌ ✓ Mike Hilgers (Republican); ▌Jocelyn Brasher (Democratic)
Nevada	Aaron D. Ford	Democratic	2018	52.3% D	Incumbent term-limited. Democratic hold.	▌ ✓ Nicole Cannizzaro (Democratic); ▌Adriana Guzmán Fralick (Republican)
New Mexico	Raúl Torrez	Democratic	2022	55.3% D	Incumbent re-elected.	▌ ✓ Raúl Torrez (Democratic); ▌Sam Kane (Republican)
New York	Letitia James	Democratic	2018	54.3% D	Incumbent re-elected.	▌ ✓ Letitia James (Democratic); ▌Saritha Komatireddy (Republican)
North Dakota	Drew Wrigley	Republican	2022 (Note: Wrigley took office after his predecessor, Wayne Stenehjem, died. He was subsequently elected in 2022.)	71.1% R	Incumbent re-elected.	▌ ✓ Drew Wrigley (Republican); ▌Tim Lamb (Democratic-NPL)
Ohio	Dave Yost	Republican	2018	60.4% R	Incumbent term-limited. Democratic gain.	▌ ✓ John Kulewicz (Democratic); ▌Keith Faber (Republican)
Oklahoma	Gentner Drummond	Republican	2022	73.8% R	Incumbent retired to run for governor. Republican hold.	▌ ✓ Jon Echols (Republican); ▌Nick Coffey (Democratic)
Rhode Island	Peter Neronha	Democratic	2018	61.6% D	Incumbent term-limited. Democratic hold.	▌ ✓ Kimberly Ahern (Democratic); ▌Alan Gordon (Republican)
South Carolina	Alan Wilson	Republican	2010	100% R (Note: Wilson ran unopposed in 2022.)	Incumbent retired to run for governor. Republican hold.	▌ ✓ David Stumbo (Republican); ▌Richard Hricik (Democratic)
South Dakota	Marty Jackley	Republican	2022	100% R (Note: Jackley ran unopposed in 2022.)	Incumbent retiring to run for U.S. House. Republican hold.	▌ ✓ Lance Russell (Republican)
Texas	Ken Paxton	Republican	2014	53.4% R	Incumbent retired to run for U.S. Senate. Democratic gain.	▌ ✓ Nathan Johnson (Democratic); ▌Mayes Middleton (Republican); ▌Tom Oxford (Libertarian)
Vermont	Charity Clark	Democratic	2022	57.9% D	Incumbent re-elected.	▌ ✓ Charity Clark (Democratic); ▌Ed Kemon (Republican)
Wisconsin	Josh Kaul	Democratic	2018	50.7% D	Incumbent re-elected.	▌ ✓ Josh Kaul (Democratic); ▌Eric Toney (Republican)

=== Territories and federal district ===
Territory	Attorney general	Party	First elected	Last race	Status	Candidates
District of Columbia	Brian Schwalb	Democratic	2022	100.0% D (Note: Schwalb ran unopposed in 2022.)	Incumbent re-elected.	▌ ✓ Brian Schwalb (Democratic); ▌Manuel Rivera (Republican)
Guam	Douglas Moylan	Nonpartisan (Note: The attorney general of Guam is elected on a nonpartisan basis, although individuals do affiliate with national parties. In Moylan's case, this is with the Republican Party.)	2022	46.2% NP/R	Incumbent lost re-election.	▌ ✓ Phillip Tydingco (Nonpartisan); ▌Douglas Moylan (Nonpartisan); ▌Tom Fisher (Nonpartisan); ▌Peter Santos (Nonpartisan); ▌Jordan Pauluhn (Nonpartisan)
Northern Mariana Islands	Edward Manibusan	Nonpartisan (Note: The attorney general of the Northern Mariana Islands is elected on a nonpartisan basis, although individuals do affiliate with national parties. In Manibusan's case, this is with the Democratic Party.)	2014	55.2% NP/D	Incumbent retired.	▌Michael Evangelista (Nonpartisan); ▌Joaquin Torres (Nonpartisan)

== Alabama ==
Alabama Attorney General election
Nominee	Katherine Robertson	Jeff McLaughlin
Party	Republican	Democratic
Incumbent Attorney General
Steve Marshall
Republican

Attorney General Steve Marshall was re-elected in 2022 with 68% of the vote. He is term-limited and cannot seek re-election. Republican candidates include Blount County District Attorney Pamela Casey, former Alabama Supreme Court associate justice Jay Mitchell, and Marshall's general counsel Katherine Robertson.

== Arizona ==
Arizona Attorney General election
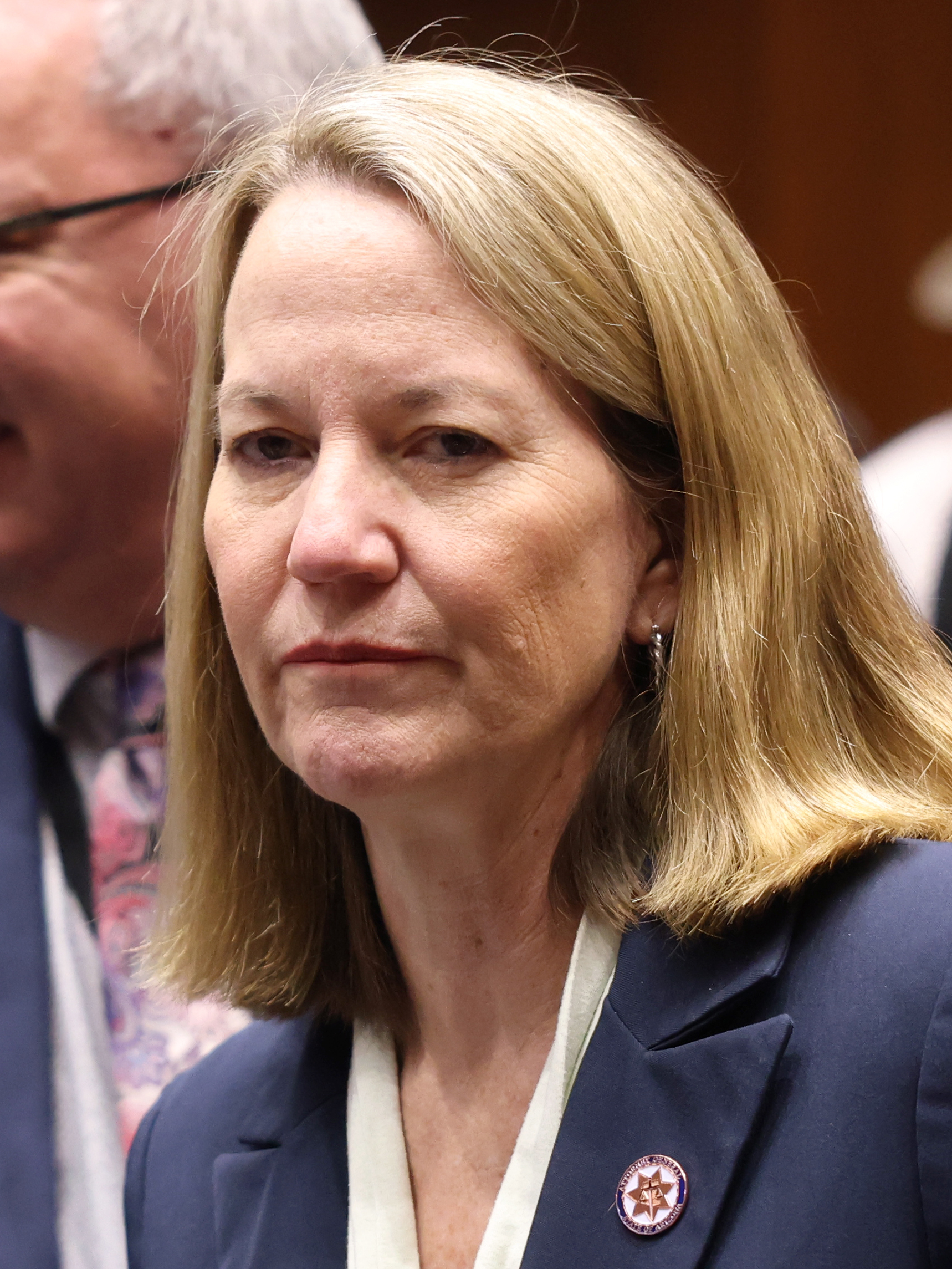

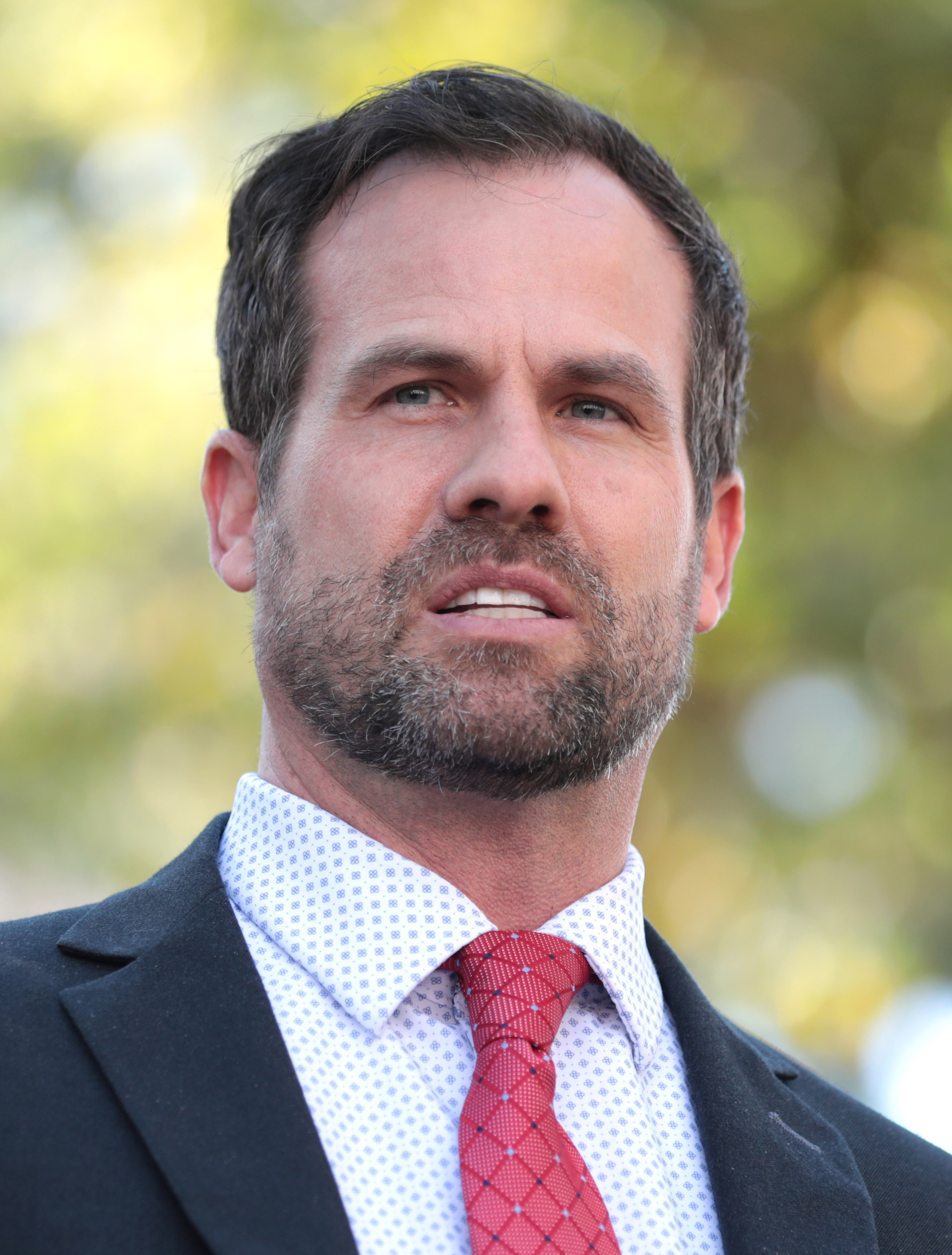
Nominee	Kris Mayes	Warren Petersen
Party	Democratic	Republican
Incumbent Attorney General
Kris Mayes
Democratic

Attorney General Kris Mayes was elected in 2022 with 50% of the vote. She is running for re-election to a second term in office. She is being challenged by Republican Warren Petersen.

== Arkansas ==
Arkansas Attorney General election
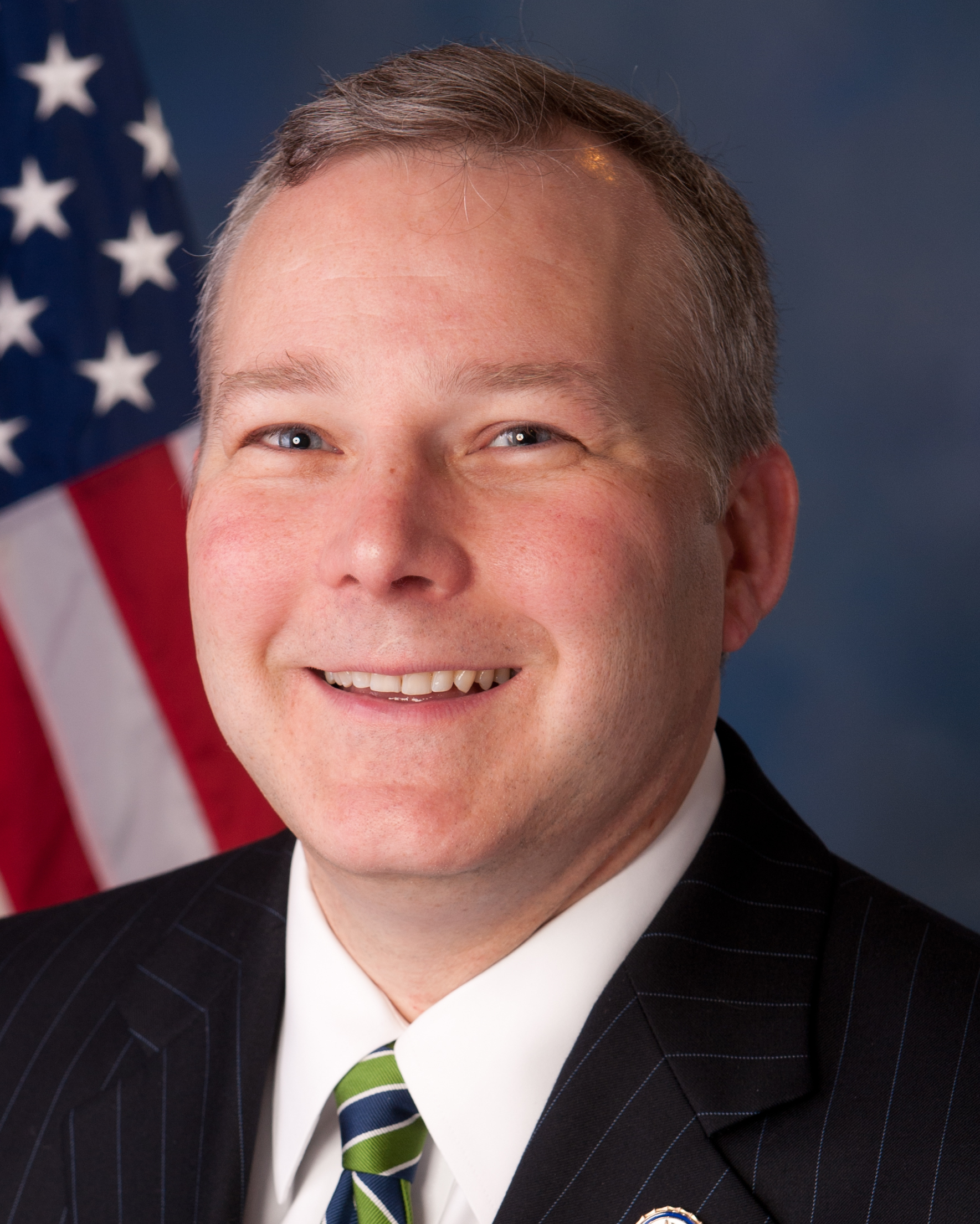
Nominee	Tim Griffin
Party	Republican
Incumbent Attorney General
Tim Griffin
Republican

Attorney General Tim Griffin was elected in 2022 with 67.6% of the vote. He is running for re-election. He is unopposed in the general election.

== California ==
California Attorney General election
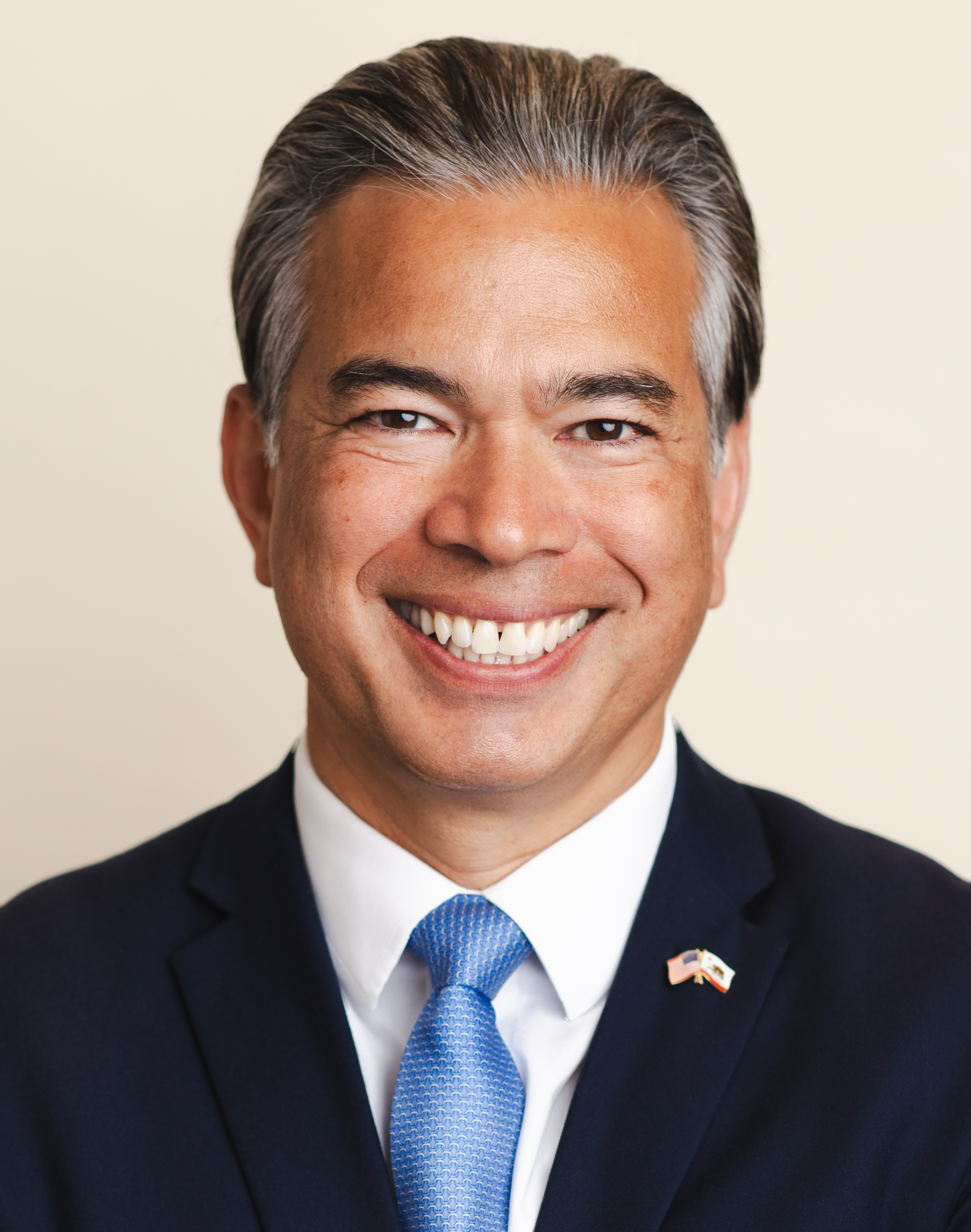

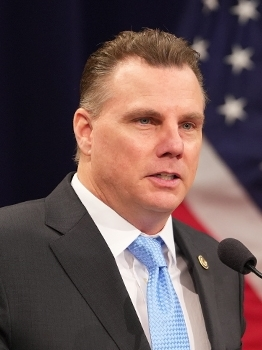
Candidate	Rob Bonta	Michael Gates
Party	Democratic	Republican
Incumbent Attorney General
Rob Bonta
Democratic

Attorney General Rob Bonta was elected in 2022 with 59.1% of the vote. He is running for re-election to a second term in office. Former Huntington Beach city attorney Michael Gates is the Republican nominee.

== Colorado ==
Colorado Attorney General election
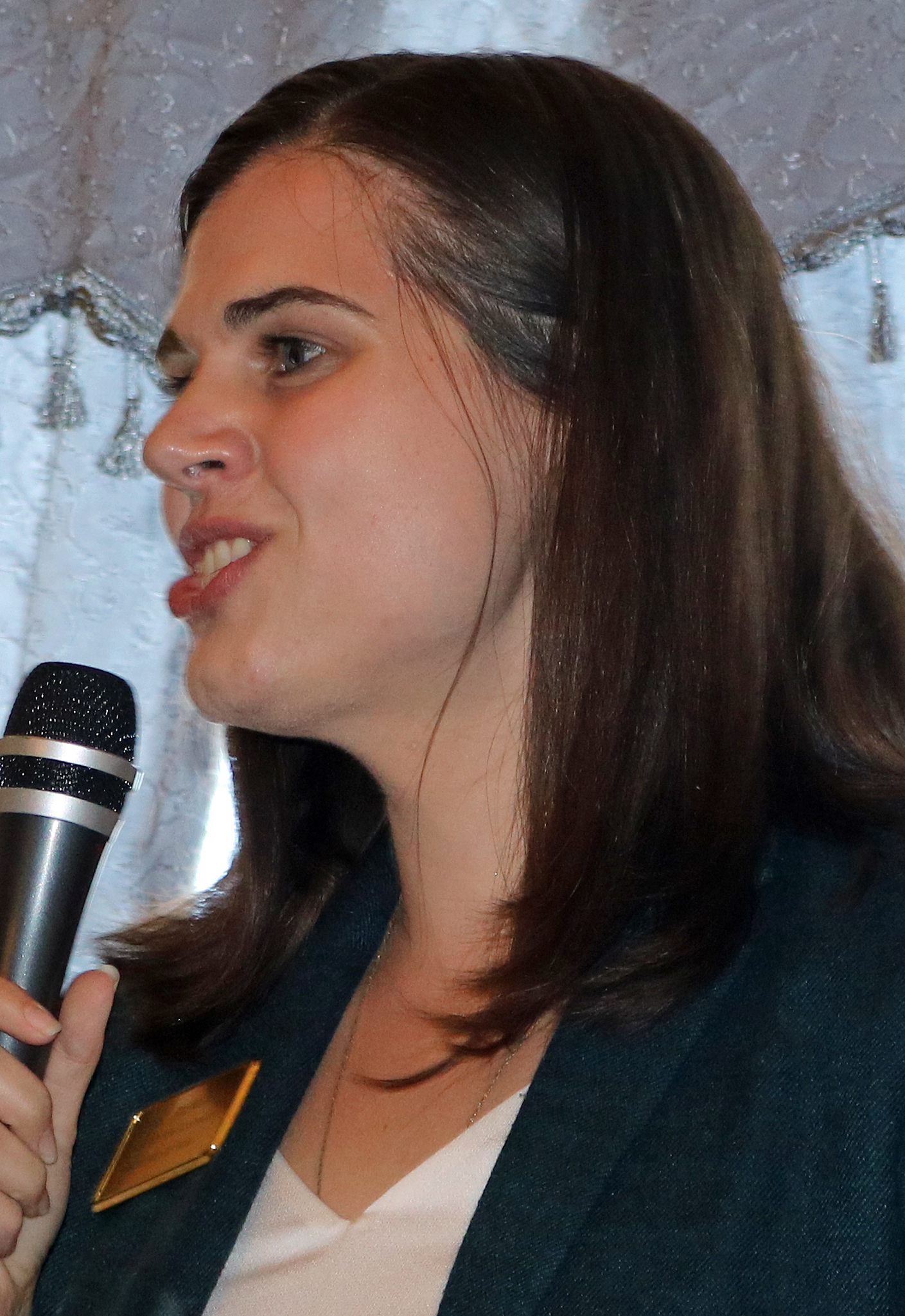

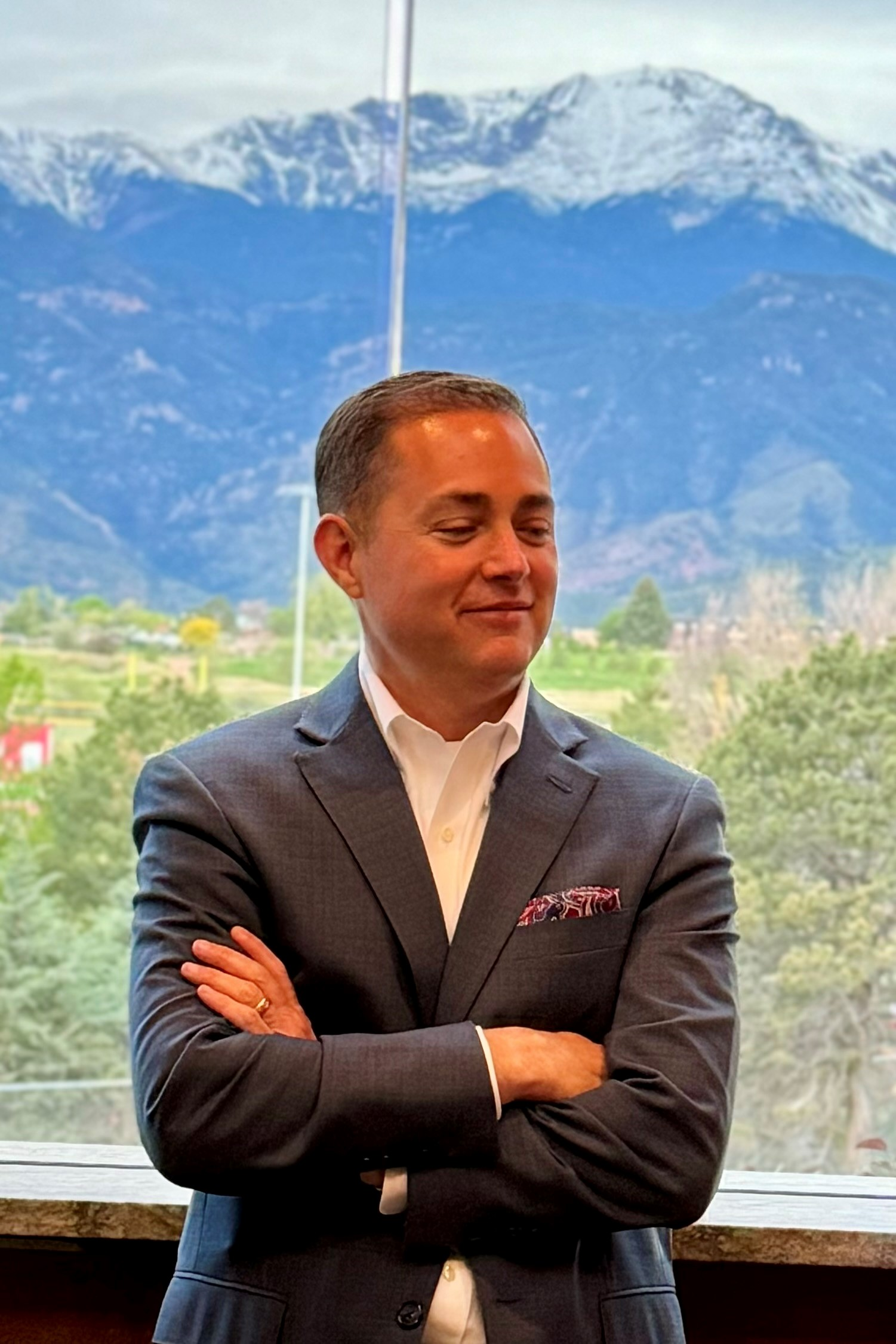
Nominee	Jena Griswold	Michael J. Allen
Party	Democratic	Republican
Incumbent Attorney General
Phil Weiser
Democratic

Attorney General Phil Weiser was re-elected in 2022 with 54.7% of the vote. He is term-limited and cannot seek re-election. Boulder County District Attorney Michael Dougherty, former speaker of the Colorado House of Representatives Crisanta Duran, and Secretary of State Jena Griswold have declared their intents to run in the Democratic primary. The Republican nominee is Michael Allen.

== Connecticut ==
Connecticut Attorney General election
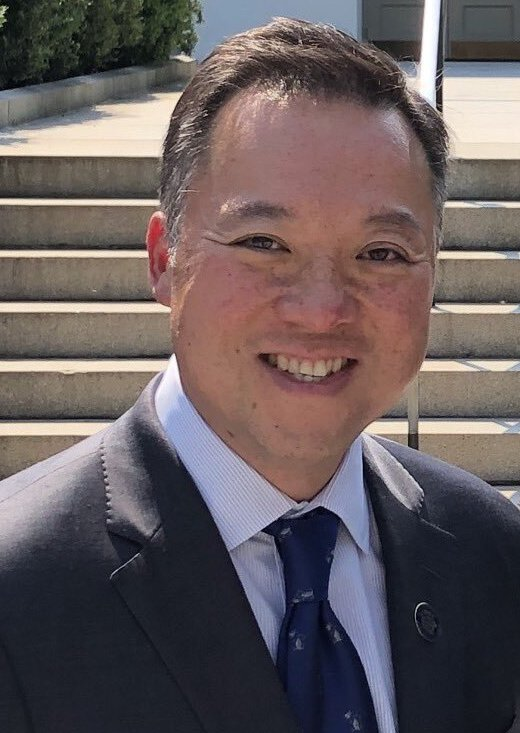

Nominee	William Tong	John Bolton
Party	Democratic	Republican
Incumbent Attorney General
William Tong
Democratic

Attorney General William Tong was re-elected in 2022 with 57% of the vote. He is running for re-election. Republican John Bolton (Note: No relation to former National Security Advisor John Bolton) is running against him.

== Delaware ==
Delaware Attorney General election
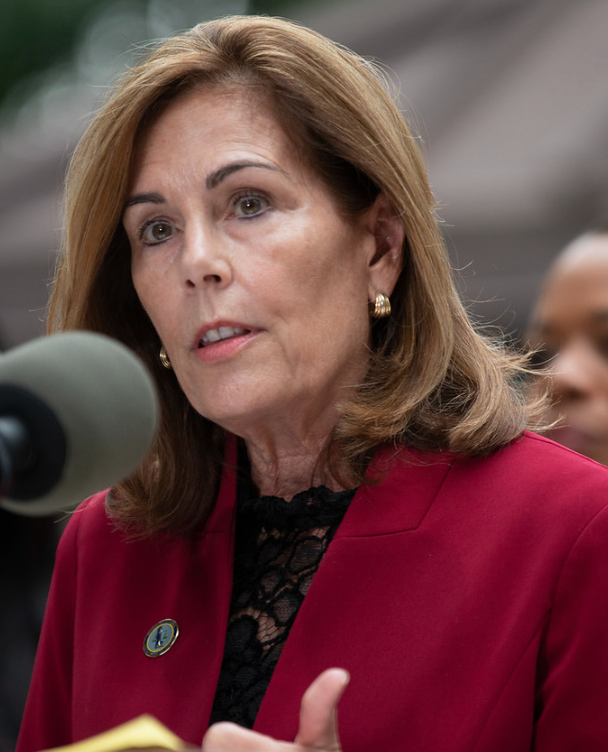

Nominee	Kathy Jennings	Dave Graham
Party	Democratic	Republican
Incumbent Attorney General
Kathy Jennings
Democratic

Attorney General Kathy Jennings was re-elected in 2022 with 53.8% of the vote. She is running for re-election to a third term in office.

== Florida ==
Florida Attorney General election
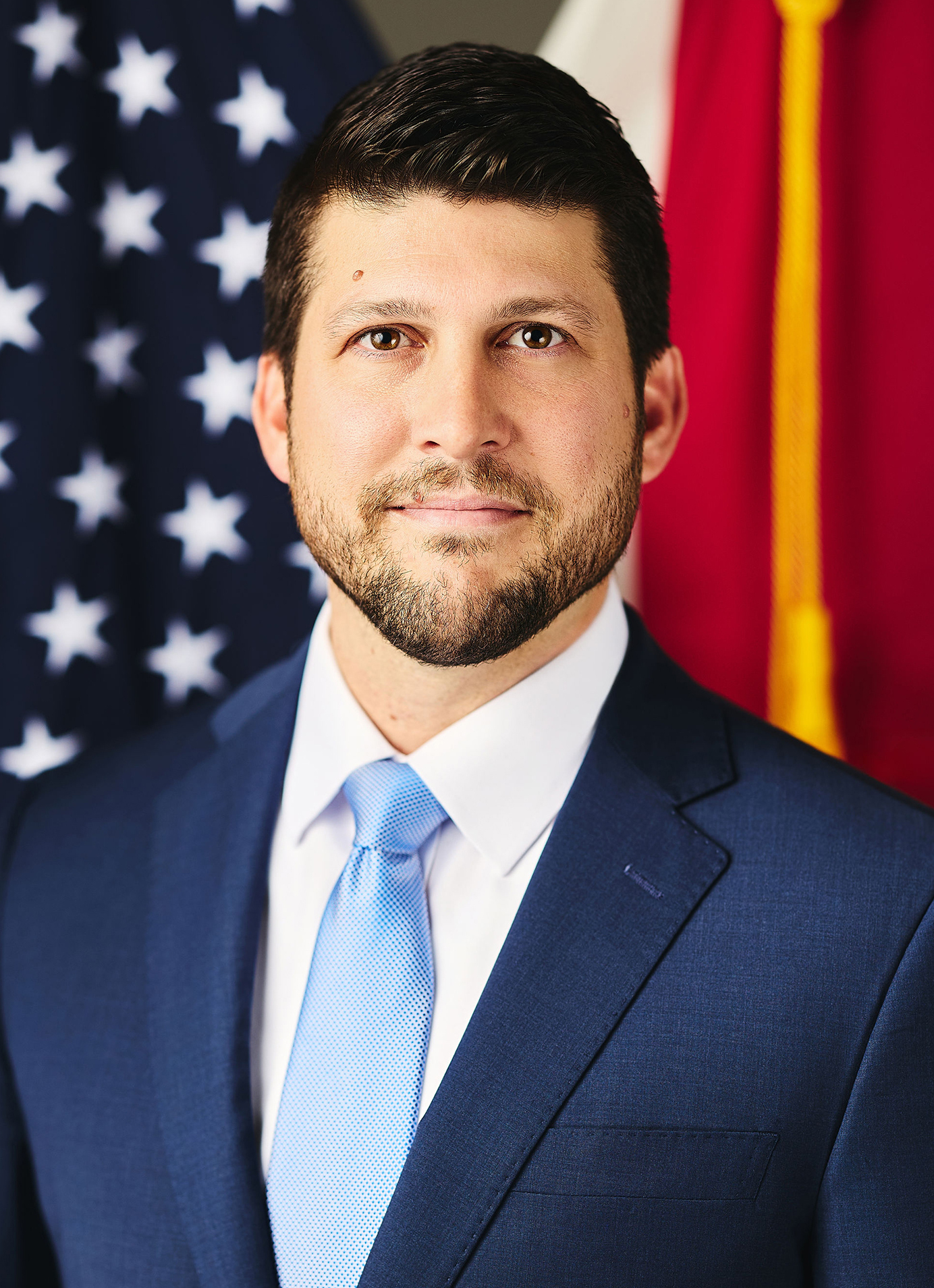

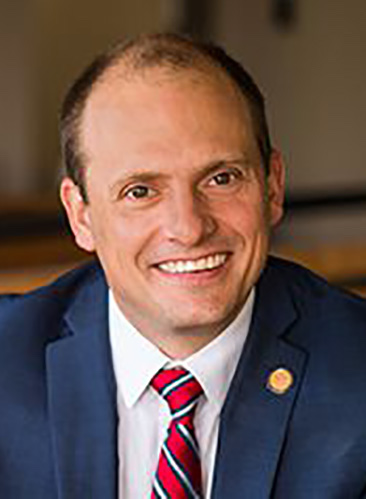
Nominee	James Uthmeier	José Javier Rodríguez
Party	Republican	Democratic
Incumbent Attorney General
James Uthmeier
Republican

Attorney General Ashley Moody was re-elected in 2022 with 60.6% of the vote. On January 16, 2025, Governor Ron DeSantis appointed her to the U.S. Senate to replace Marco Rubio, who was the nominee for U.S. secretary of state. DeSantis appointed James Uthmeier, his chief of staff, to the position. Uthmeier kicked off his campaign to be elected to a full four-year term on March 11, 2025.

== Georgia ==
Georgia Attorney General election
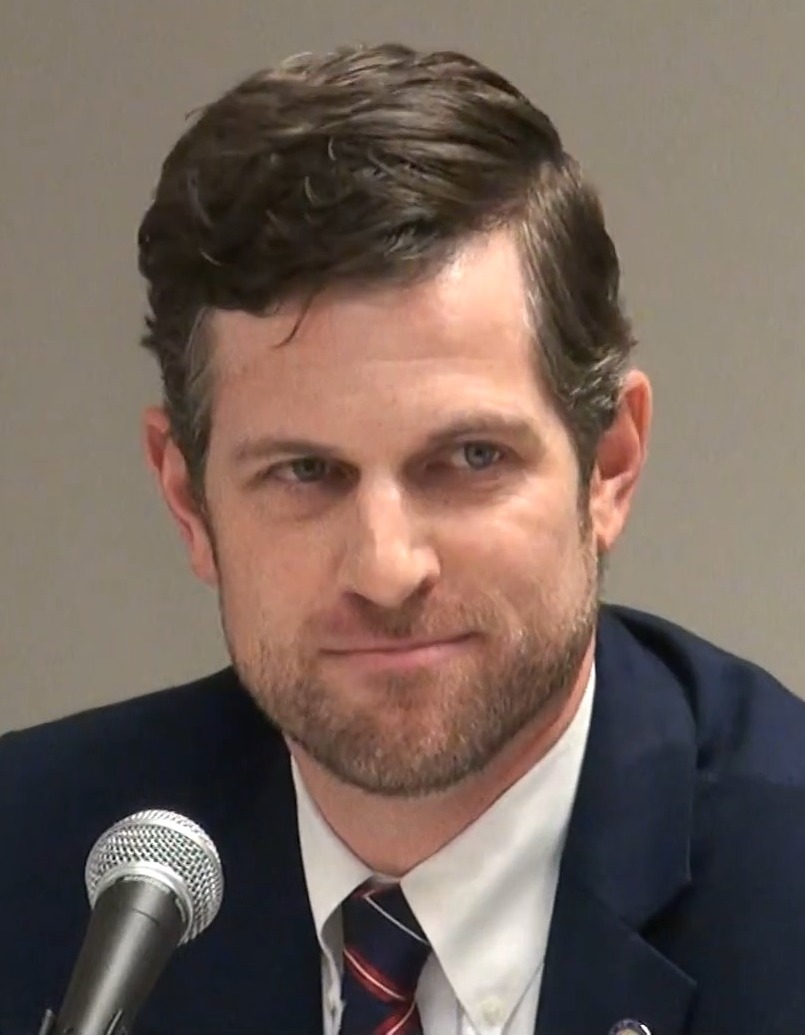

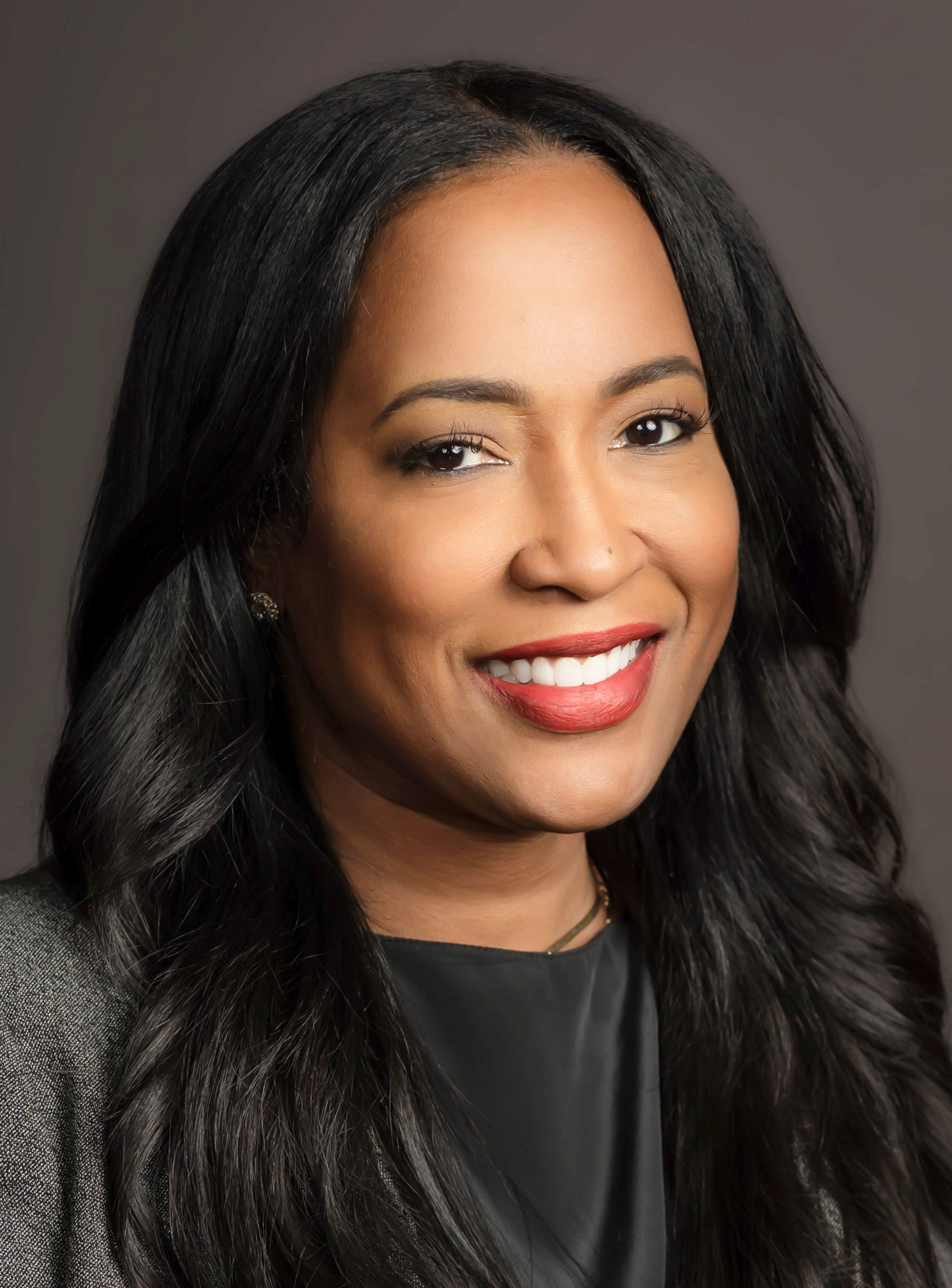
Nominee	Brian Strickland	Tanya Miller
Party	Republican	Democratic
Incumbent Attorney General
Chris Carr
Republican

Attorney General Chris Carr was re-elected in 2022 with 51.9% of the vote. He is retiring to run for governor. Republican state senators Brian Strickland and Bill Cowsert are running to succeed Carr. State representative Tanya F. Miller and former state representative and Georgia House of Representatives minority leader Bob Trammell are running as Democrats.

== Idaho ==
Idaho Attorney General election
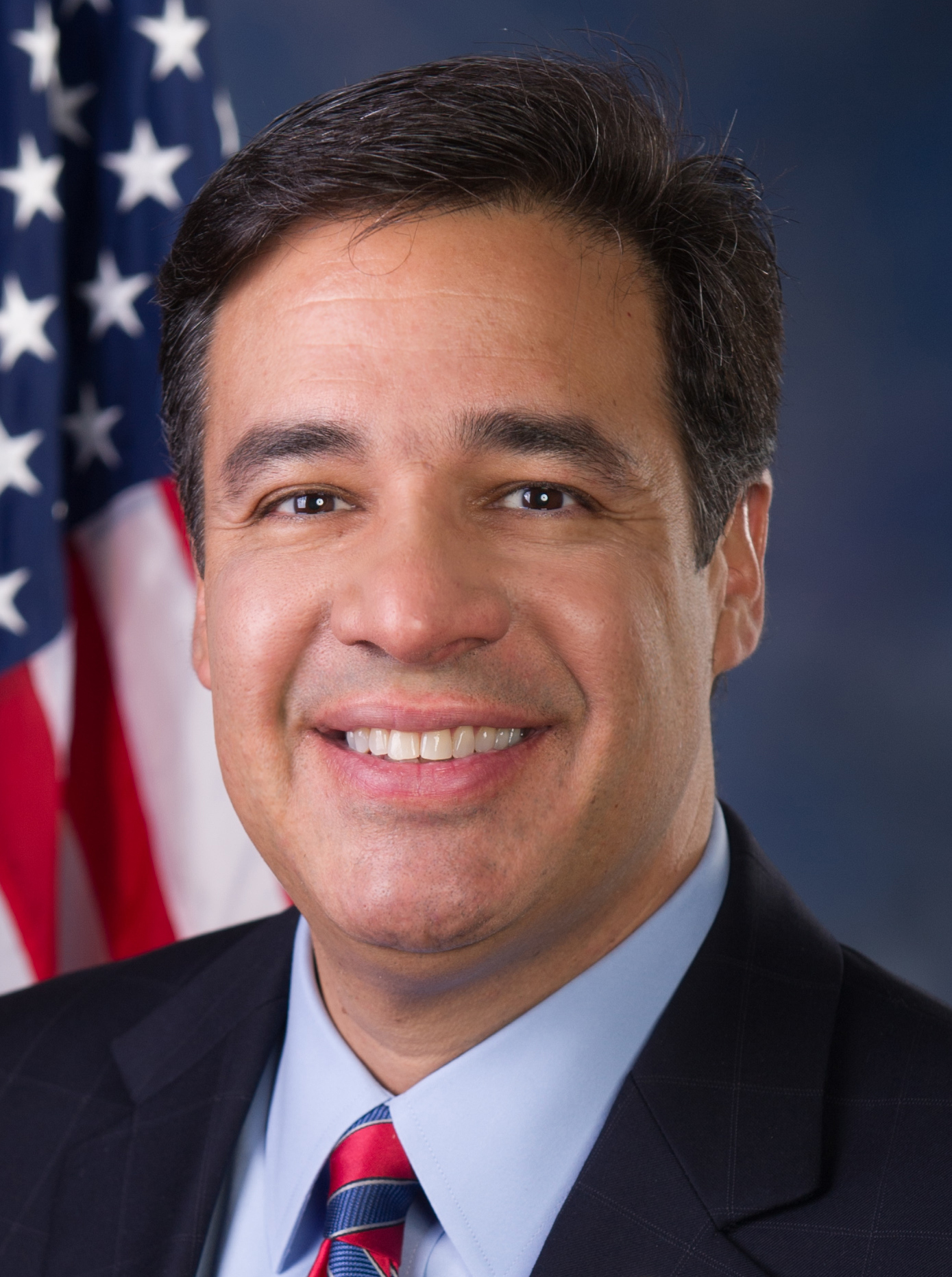

Nominee	Raúl Labrador	Lori Hickman
Party	Republican	Democratic
Incumbent Attorney General
Raúl Labrador
Republican

Attorney General Raúl Labrador was elected in 2022 with 62.6% of the vote. He is running for re-election for a second term. Democrat Lori Hickman is challenging him.

== Illinois ==
Illinois Attorney General election
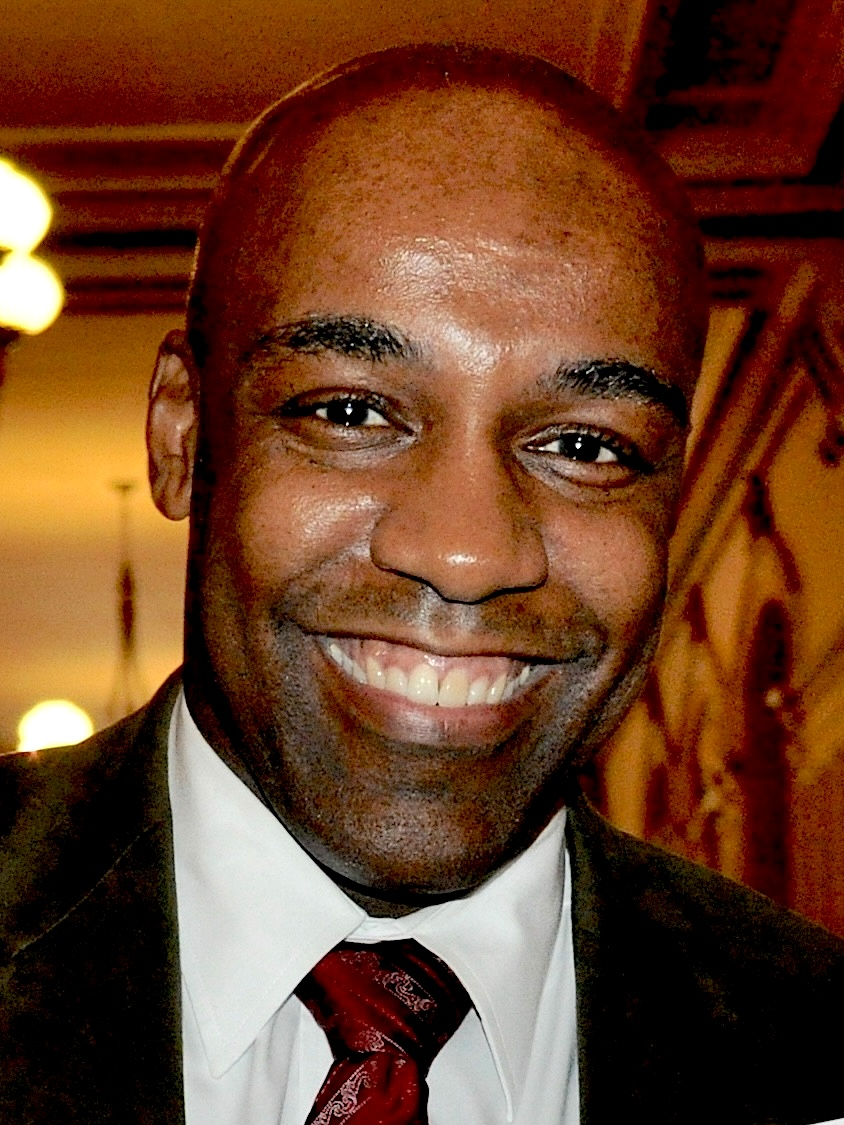

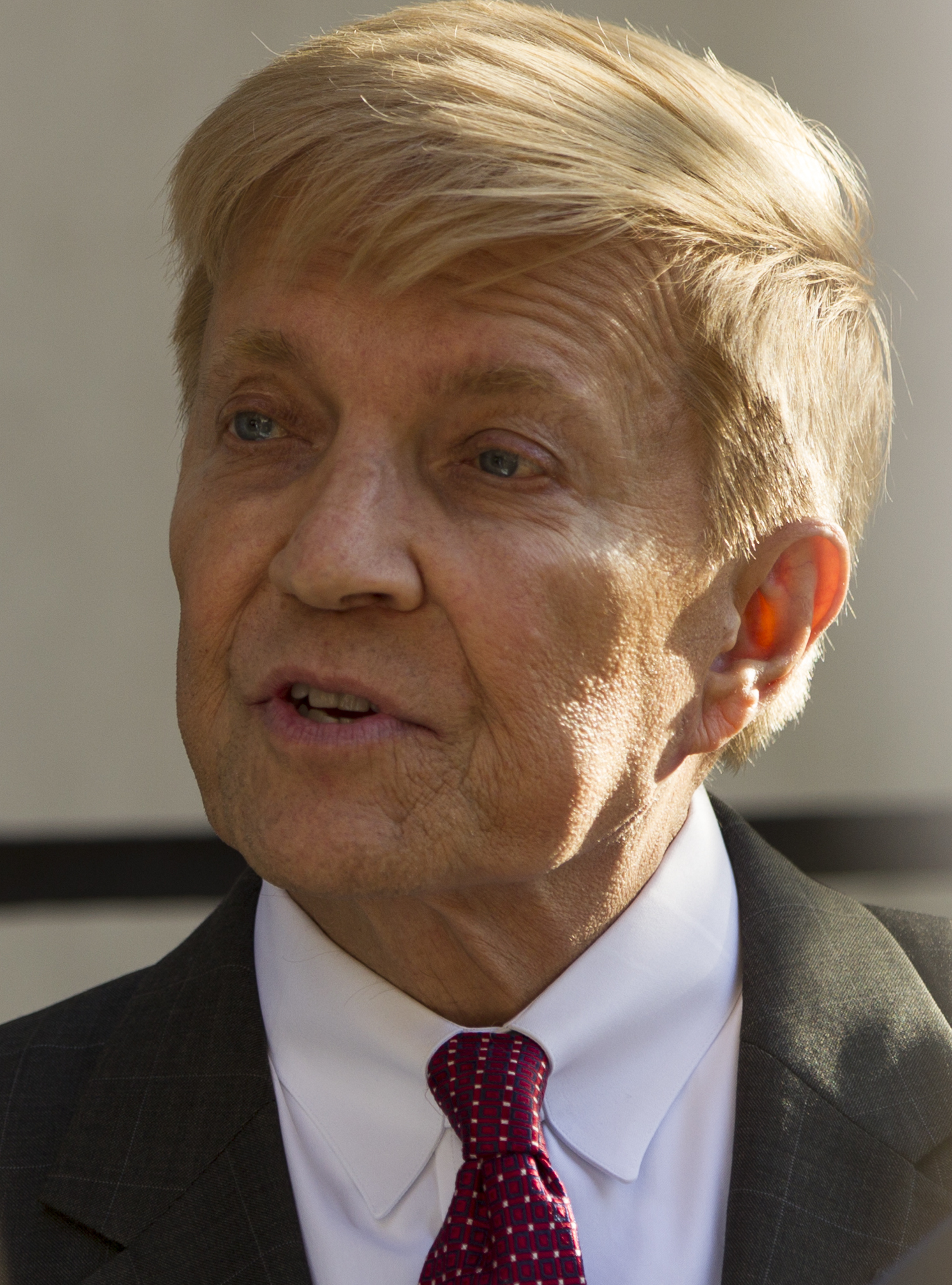
Nominee	Kwame Raoul	Bob Fioretti
Party	Democratic	Republican
Incumbent Attorney General
Kwame Raoul
Democratic

Attorney General Kwame Raoul was re-elected in 2022 with 54.4% of the vote. He is running for re-election. Former Chicago alder and perennial candidate Bob Fioretti is running for the Republican nomination.

== Iowa ==
Iowa Attorney General election
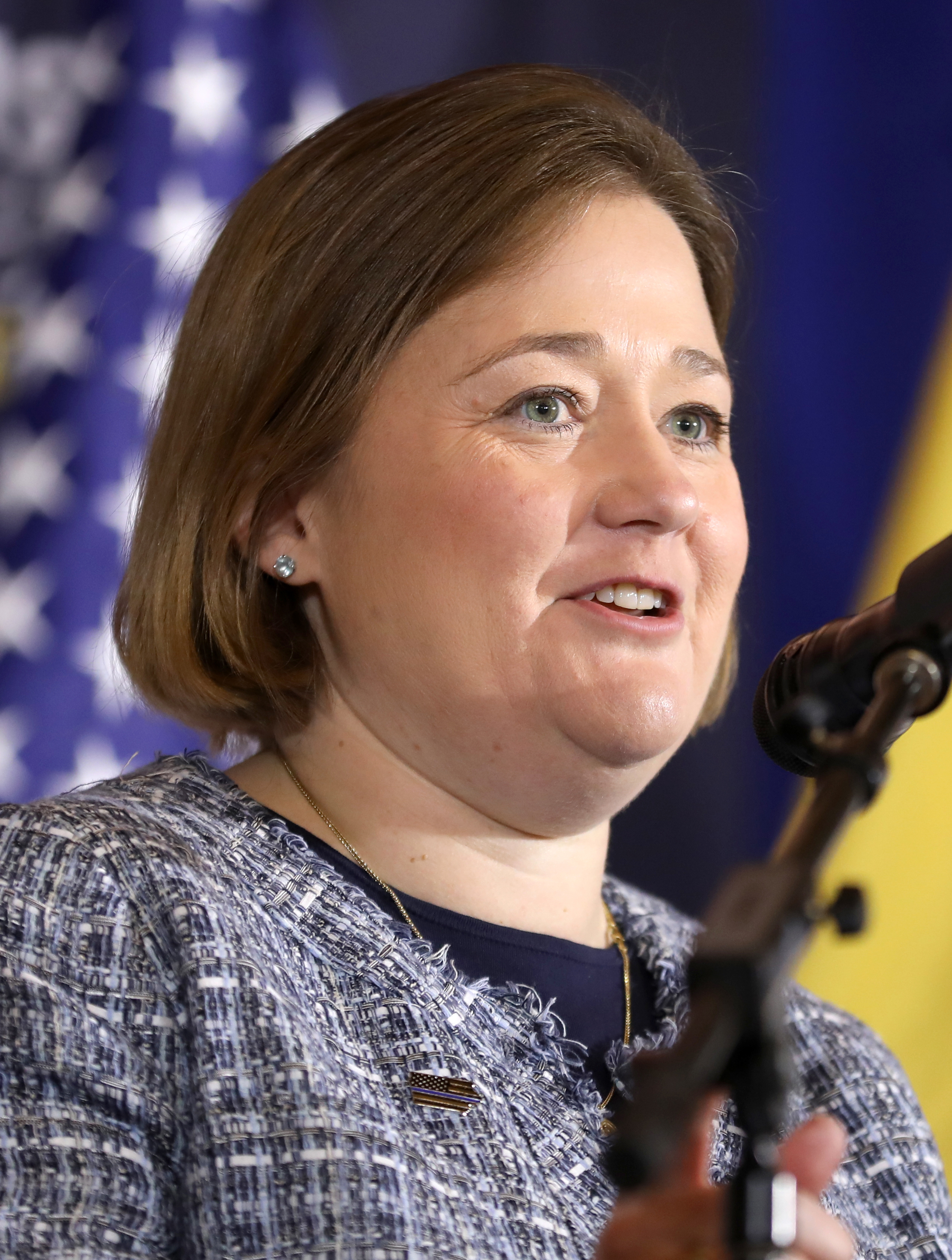

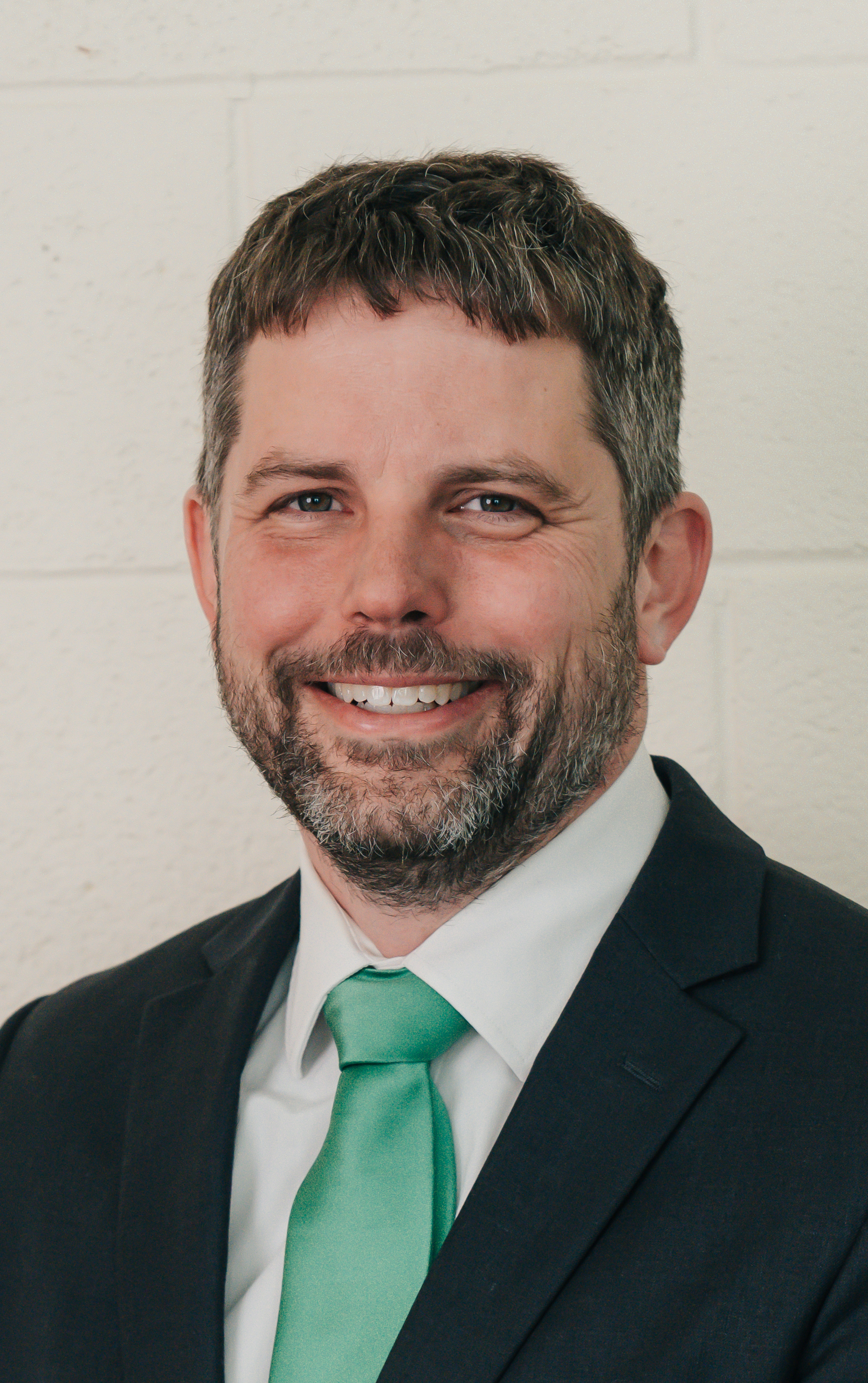
Nominee	Brenna Bird	Nathan Willems
Party	Republican	Democratic
Incumbent Attorney General
Brenna Bird
Republican

Attorney General Brenna Bird was elected in 2022 with 50.8% of the vote. She initially expressed interest in running for governor, but announced on July 2, 2025, that she would run for re-election to a second term. She is being challenged by Democratic Nathan Willems.

== Kansas ==
Kansas Attorney General election
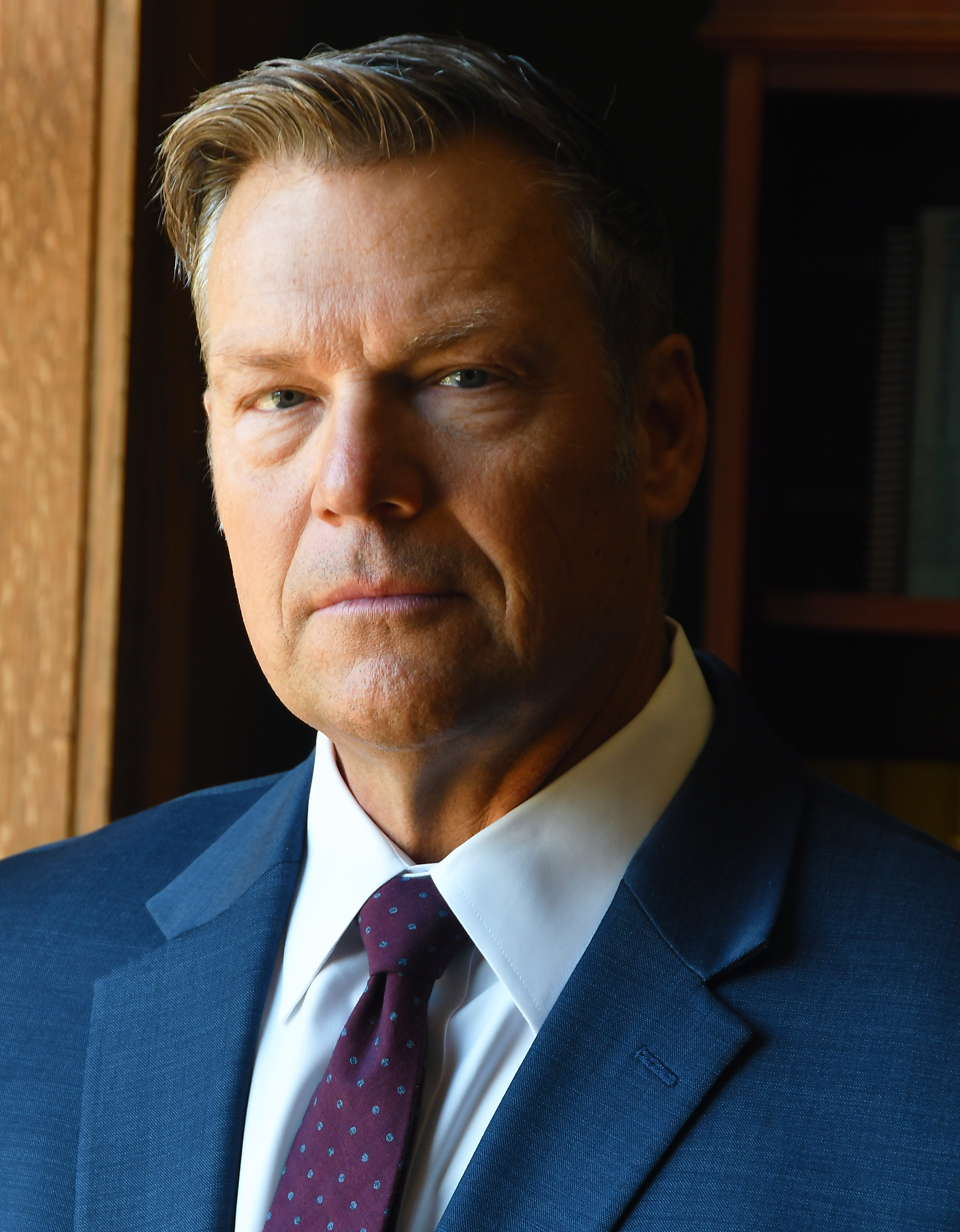

Nominee	Kris Kobach	Chris Mann
Party	Republican	Democratic
Incumbent Attorney General
Kris Kobach
Republican

Attorney General Kris Kobach was elected in 2022 with 50.8% of the vote. He is running for re-election to a second term. Democratic attorney Chris Mann, who was the party's nominee in the 2022 attorney general election, is running for the Democratic nomination.

== Maryland ==
Maryland Attorney General election
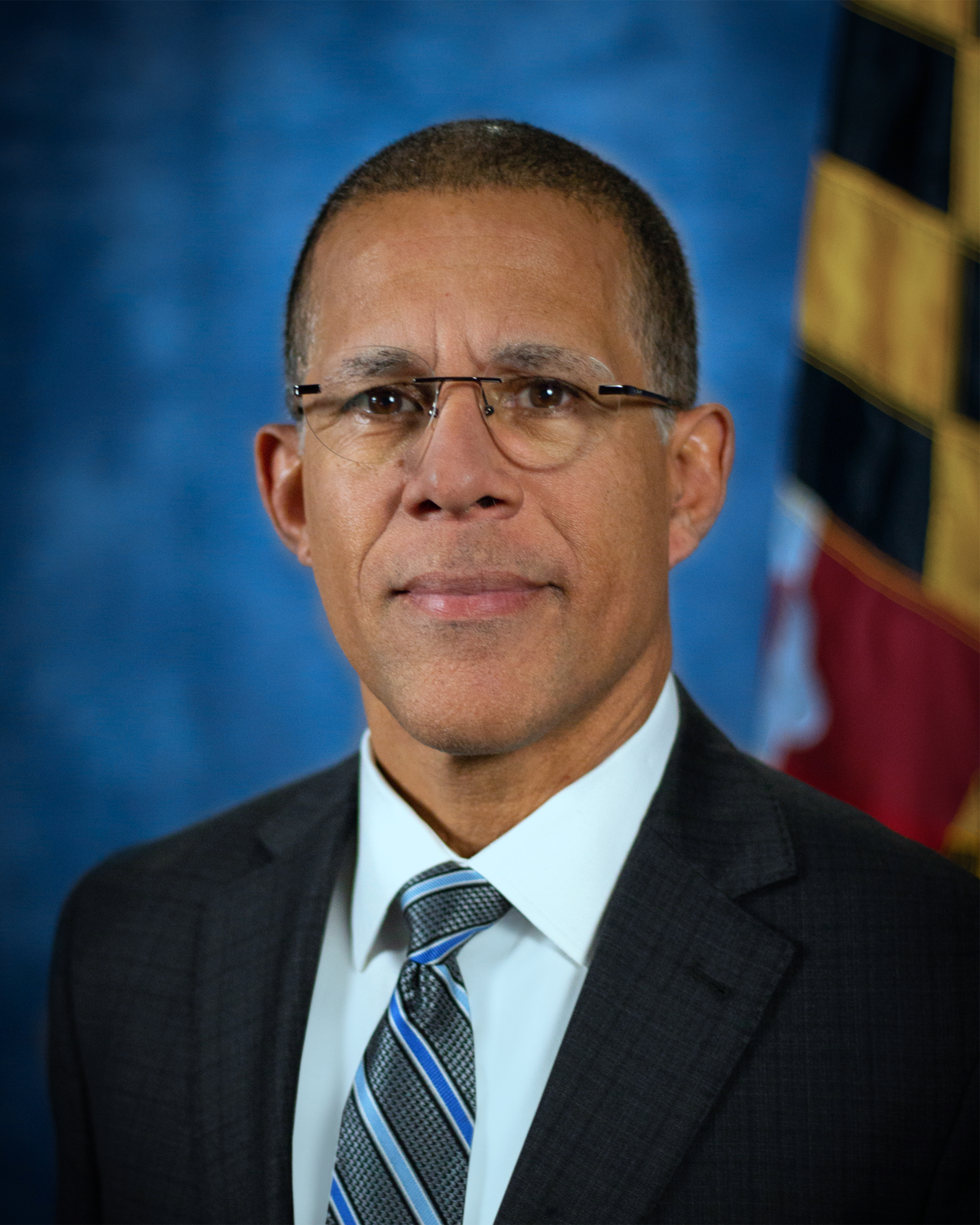

Nominee	Anthony Brown	James Rutledge III
Party	Democratic	Republican
Incumbent Attorney General
Anthony Brown
Democratic

Attorney General Anthony Brown was elected in 2022 with 65% of the vote. He is running for re-election to a second term. Former Bel Air town commissioner James Ruthledge III is running as a Republican.

== Massachusetts ==
Massachusetts Attorney General election
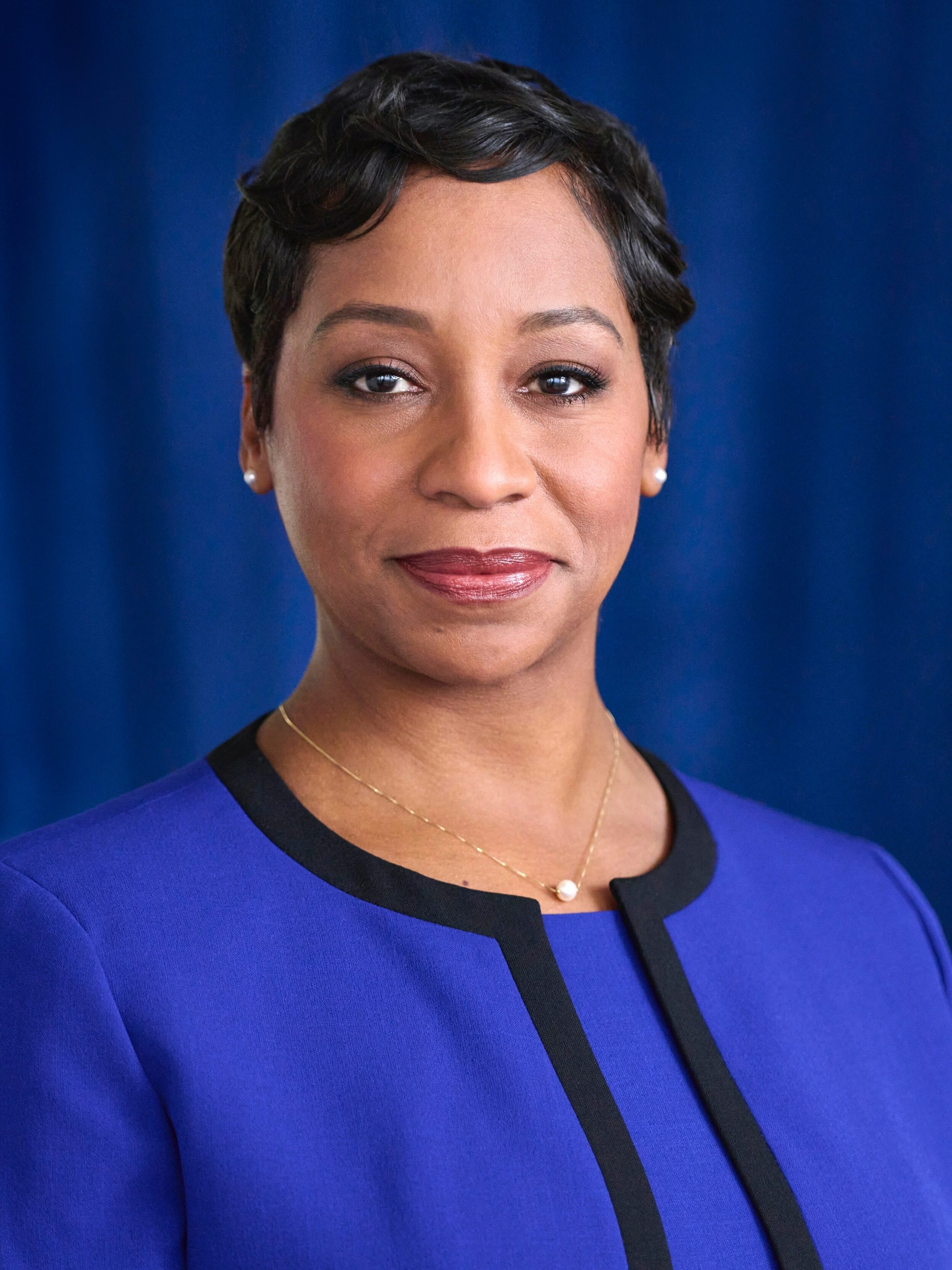

Nominee	Andrea Campbell	Michael Walsh
Party	Democratic	Republican
Incumbent Attorney General
Andrea Campbell
Democratic

Attorney General Andrea Campbell was elected in 2022 with 62.9% of the vote. She is running for re-election to a second term in office.

== Michigan ==
Michigan Attorney General election
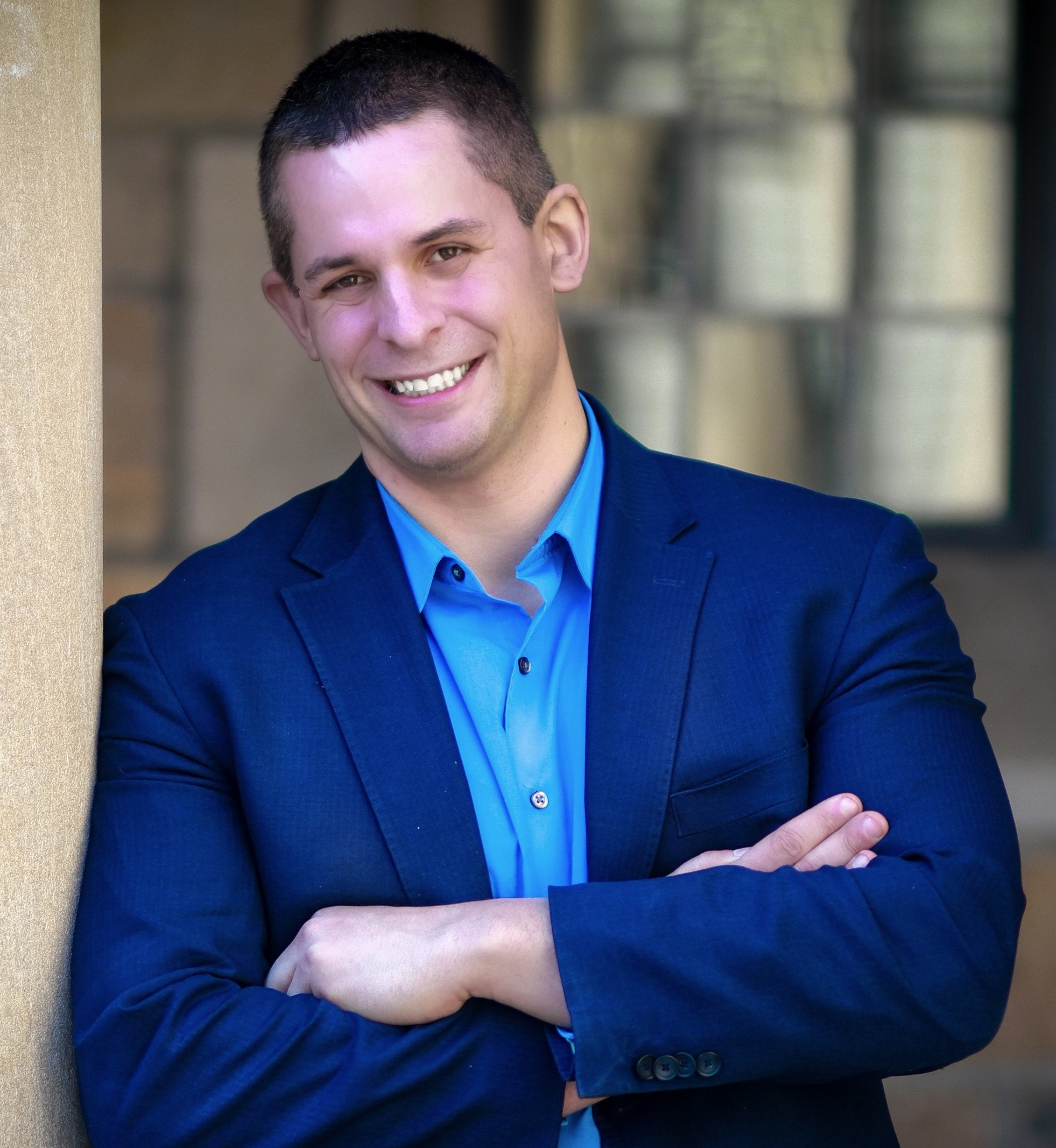

Nominee	Eli Savit	Doug Lloyd
Party	Democratic	Republican
Incumbent Attorney General
Dana Nessel
Democratic

Attorney General Dana Nessel was re-elected in 2022 with 53.2% of the vote. She is term-limited and cannot seek re-election.

== Minnesota ==
Minnesota Attorney General election
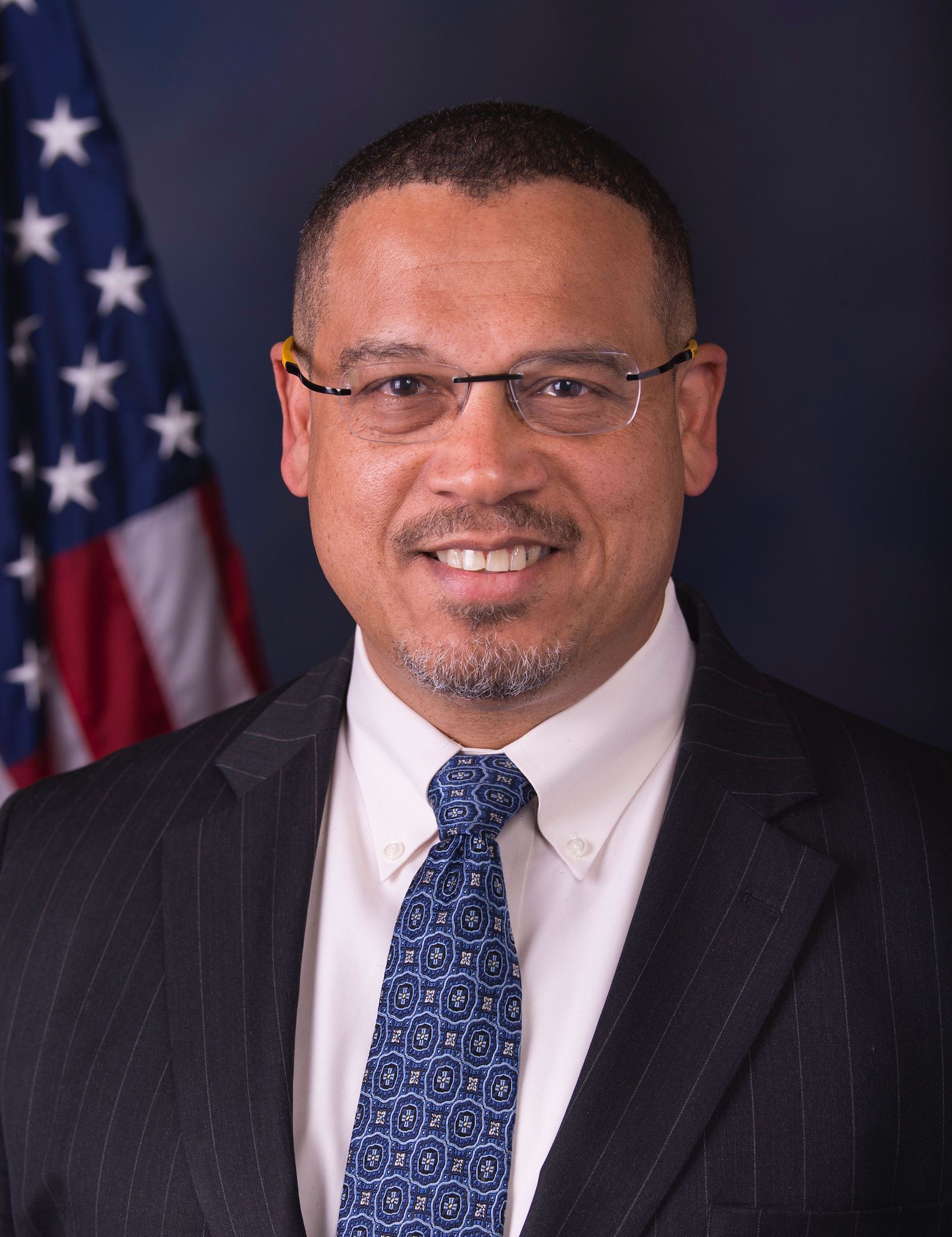

Nominee	Keith Ellison	Ron Schutz
Party	Democratic (DFL)	Republican
Incumbent Attorney General
Keith Ellison
Democratic (DFL)

Attorney General Keith Ellison was re-elected in 2022 with 50.4% of the vote. He is running for re-election to a third term in office.

== Nebraska ==
Nebraska Attorney General election
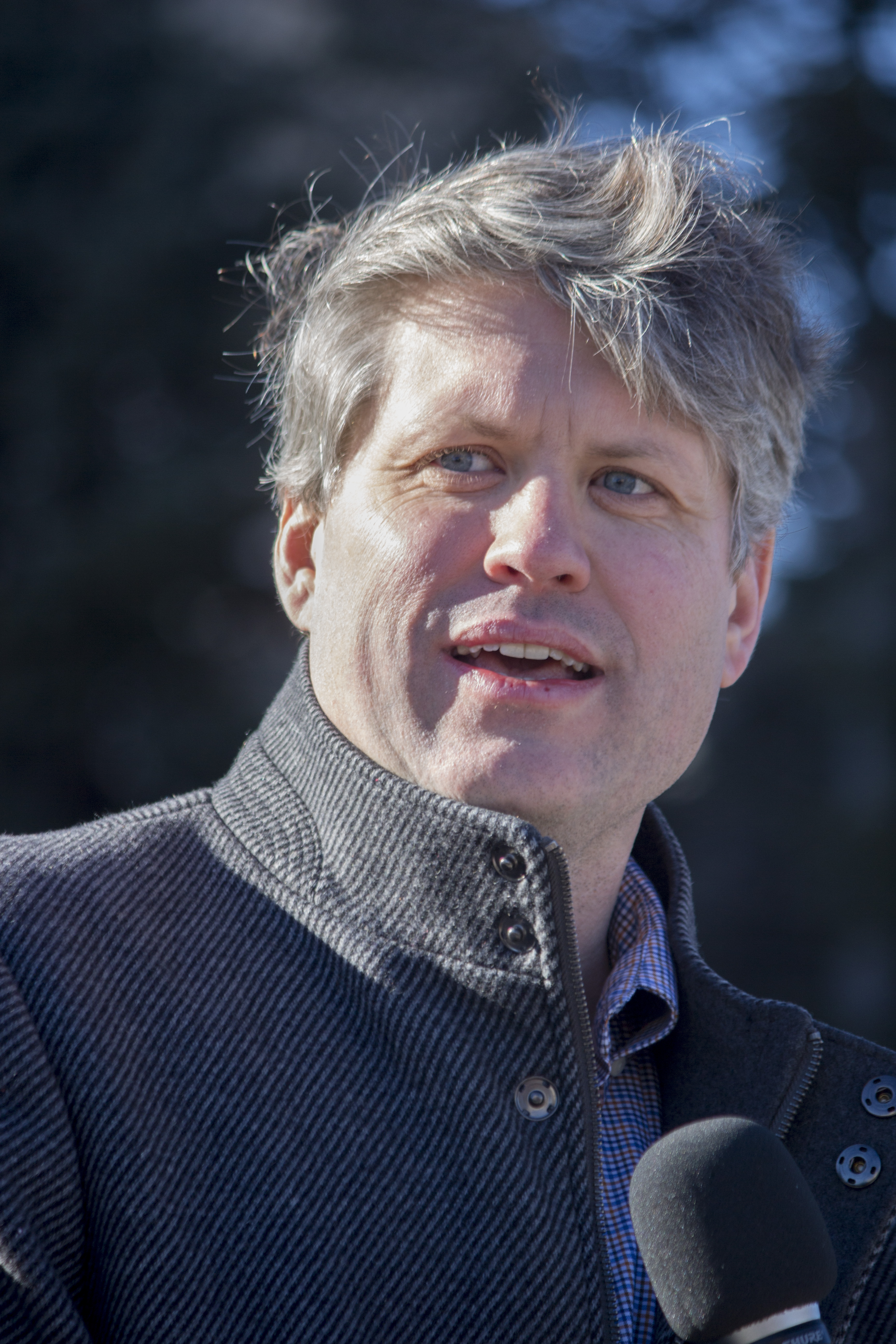

Nominee	Mike Hilgers	Jocelyn Brasher
Party	Republican	Democratic
Incumbent Attorney General
Mike Hilgers
Republican

Attorney General Mike Hilgers was elected in 2022 with 69.7% of the vote. He is running for re-election. He is being challenged by Democrat Jocelyn Brasher.

== Nevada ==
Nevada Attorney General election

Nominee	Nicole Cannizzaro	Adriana Guzmán Fralick
Party	Democratic	Republican
Incumbent Attorney General
Aaron Ford
Democratic

Attorney General Aaron D. Ford was re-elected in 2022 with 52.3% of the vote. He is term-limited and cannot seek re-election, and is running for governor. Democrats Senate majority leader Nicole Cannizzaro and state treasurer Zach Conine, and Republican Douglas County commissioners Danny Tarkanian and Adriana Guzmán Fralick have announced their candidacies.

== New Mexico ==
New Mexico Attorney General election
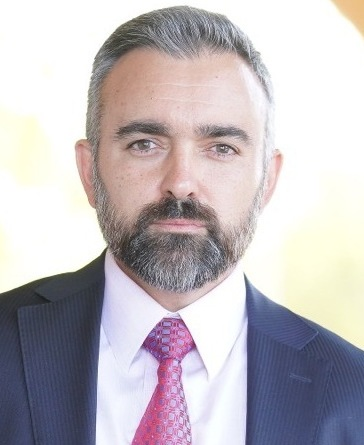

Nominee	Raúl Torrez	Samuel Kane
Party	Democratic	Republican
Incumbent Attorney General
Raúl Torrez
Democratic

Attorney General Raúl Torrez was elected in 2022 with 55.3% of the vote. He is running for re-election for a second term in office. Republican attorney Sam Kane is challenging him.

== New York ==
New York Attorney General election
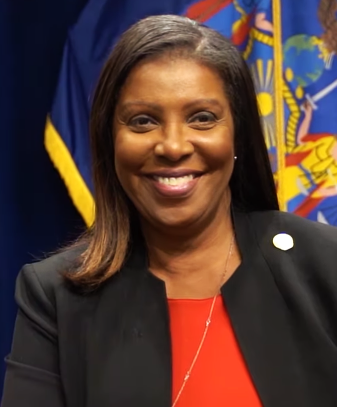

Nominee	Letitia James	Saritha Komatireddy
Party	Democratic	Republican
Incumbent Attorney General
Letitia James
Democratic

Attorney General Letitia James was re-elected in 2022 with 54.3% of the vote. She is running for re-election to a third term in office. Republican former federal prosecutor Saritha Komatireddy is challenging her.

== North Dakota ==
North Dakota Attorney General election
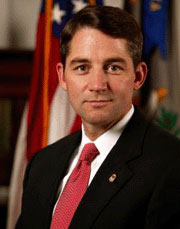

Nominee	Drew Wrigley	Tim Lamb
Party	Republican	Democratic–NPL
Incumbent Attorney General
Drew Wrigley
Republican

Attorney General Drew Wrigley was elected in 2022 with 71.1% of the vote. He is running for re-election. He is being challenged by Democrat Tim Lamb.

== Ohio ==
Ohio Attorney General election
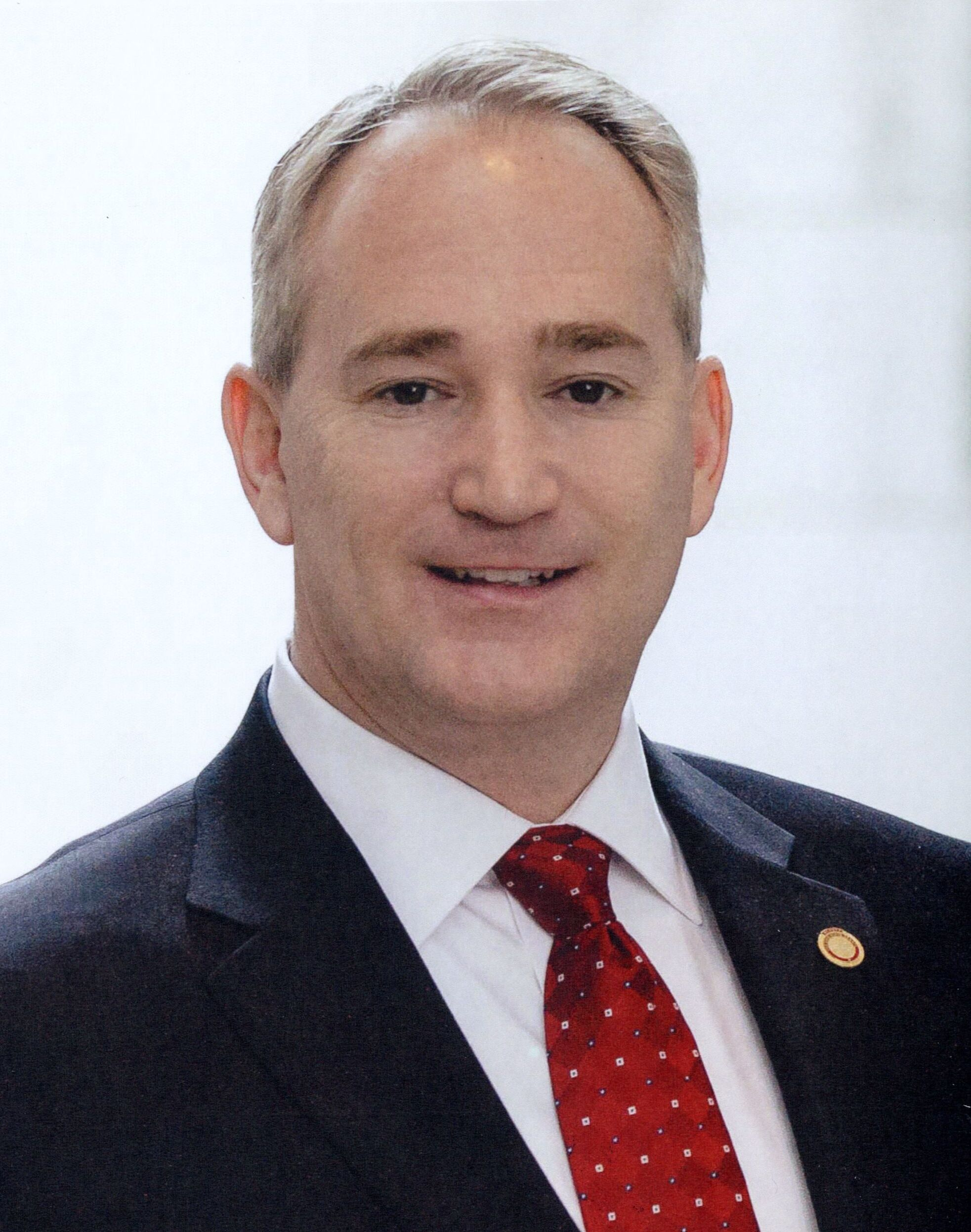

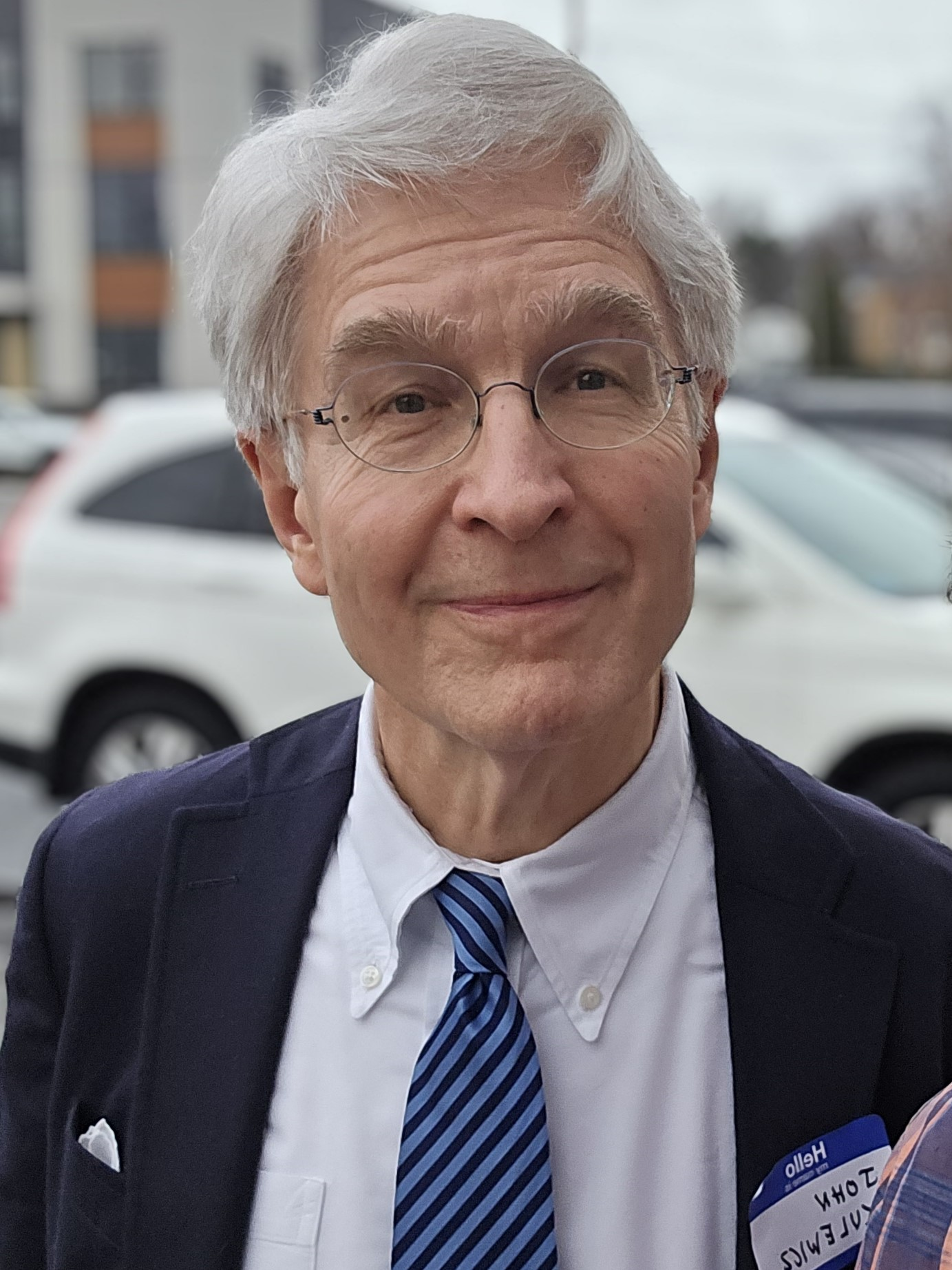
Nominee	Keith Faber	John Kulewicz
Party	Republican	Democratic
Incumbent Attorney General
Andy Wilson
Republican

Attorney General Dave Yost was re-elected in 2022 with 60.1% of the vote. He is term-limited and cannot seek re-election. Ohio Auditor of State Keith Faber has announced he will seek the Republican nomination for this seat. Former state lawmaker Elliot Forhan is running for the Democratic nomination.

== Oklahoma ==
Oklahoma Attorney General election
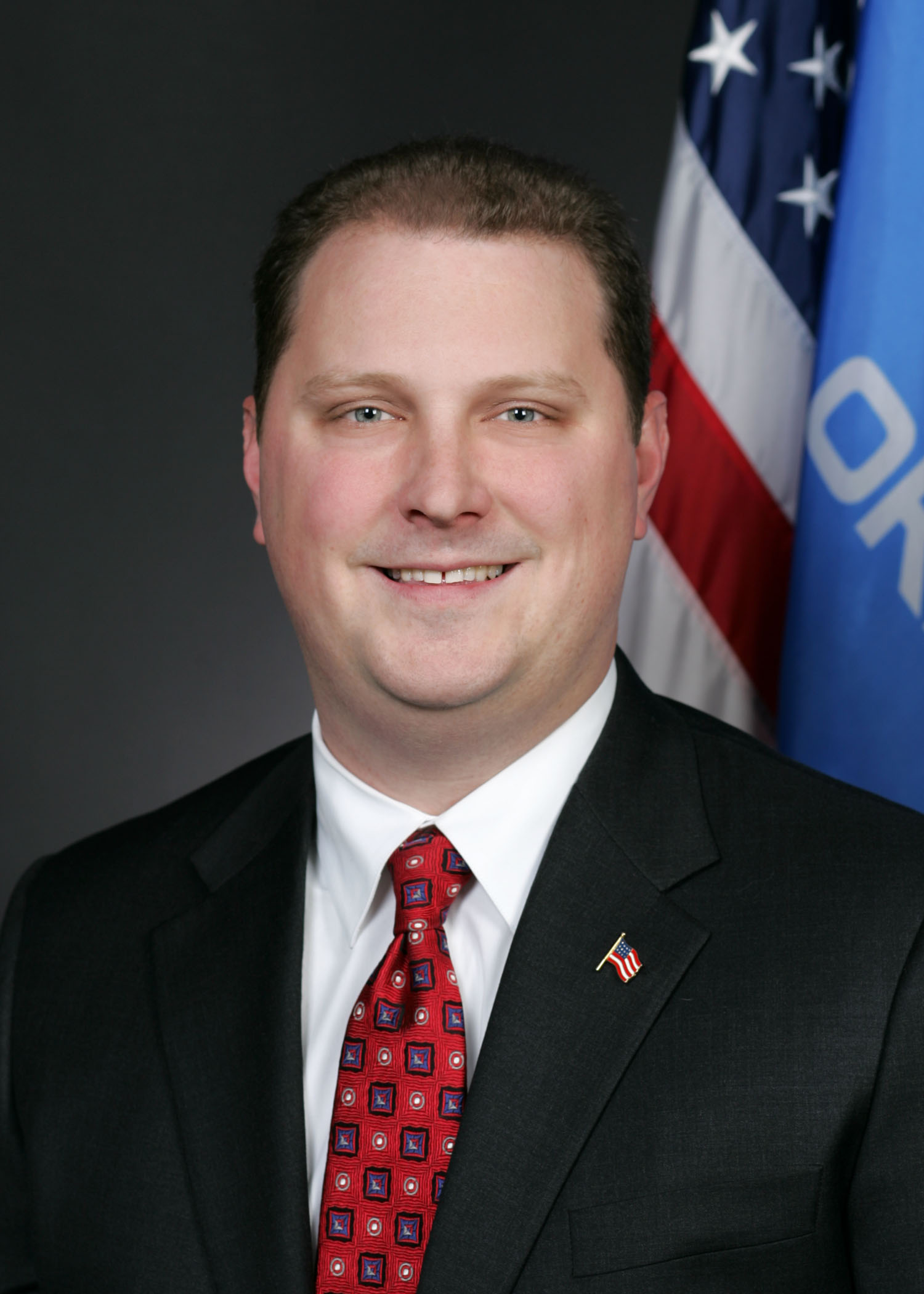

Nominee	Jon Echols	Nick Coffey
Party	Republican	Democratic
Incumbent Attorney General
Gentner Drummond
Republican

Attorney General Gentner Drummond was elected in 2022 with 73.8% of the vote. He is retiring to run for governor. Former Assistant U.S. Attorney Nick Coffey is running as a Democrat. He is facing Republican nominee Jon Echols.

== Rhode Island ==
Rhode Island Attorney General election
Nominee	Kimberly Ahern	Alan Gordon
Party	Democratic	Republican
Incumbent Attorney General
Peter Neronha
Democratic

Attorney General Peter Neronha was re-elected in 2022 with 61.6% of the vote. He is term-limited and cannot seek re-election. Keith Hoffmann, Neronha's former chief of policy, is running. State representative Jason Knight and state senator Dawn Euer have been mentioned as potential candidates. West Greenwich town councilor Charles Calenda, who was the Republican nominee for attorney general in 2022, said that he is "leaving the door open" regarding another run in 2026. Ahern emerged as the winner of the primary and is now the Democratic nominee, facing off against Republican Alan Gordon in the general election.

== South Carolina ==
South Carolina Attorney General election

Nominee	David Stumbo	Richard Hricik
Party	Republican	Democratic
Incumbent Attorney General
Alan Wilson
Republican

Attorney General Alan Wilson was re-elected unopposed in 2022. He is retiring to run for governor.

Republican state senator Stephen Goldfinch, 1st Circuit Solicitor David Pascoe, and 8th Circuit Solicitor David Stumbo are running for the Republican nomination. Attorney Richard Hricik is the presumptive Democratic nominee while David Stumbo is the presumptive Republican nominee.

== South Dakota ==
South Dakota Attorney General election
Nominee	Lance Russell
Party	Republican
Incumbent Attorney General
Marty Jackley
Republican

Attorney General Marty Jackley was re-elected unopposed in 2022. He is retiring to run for Congress. Republican Lance russell is running to succeed him unopposed.

== Texas ==
Texas Attorney General election
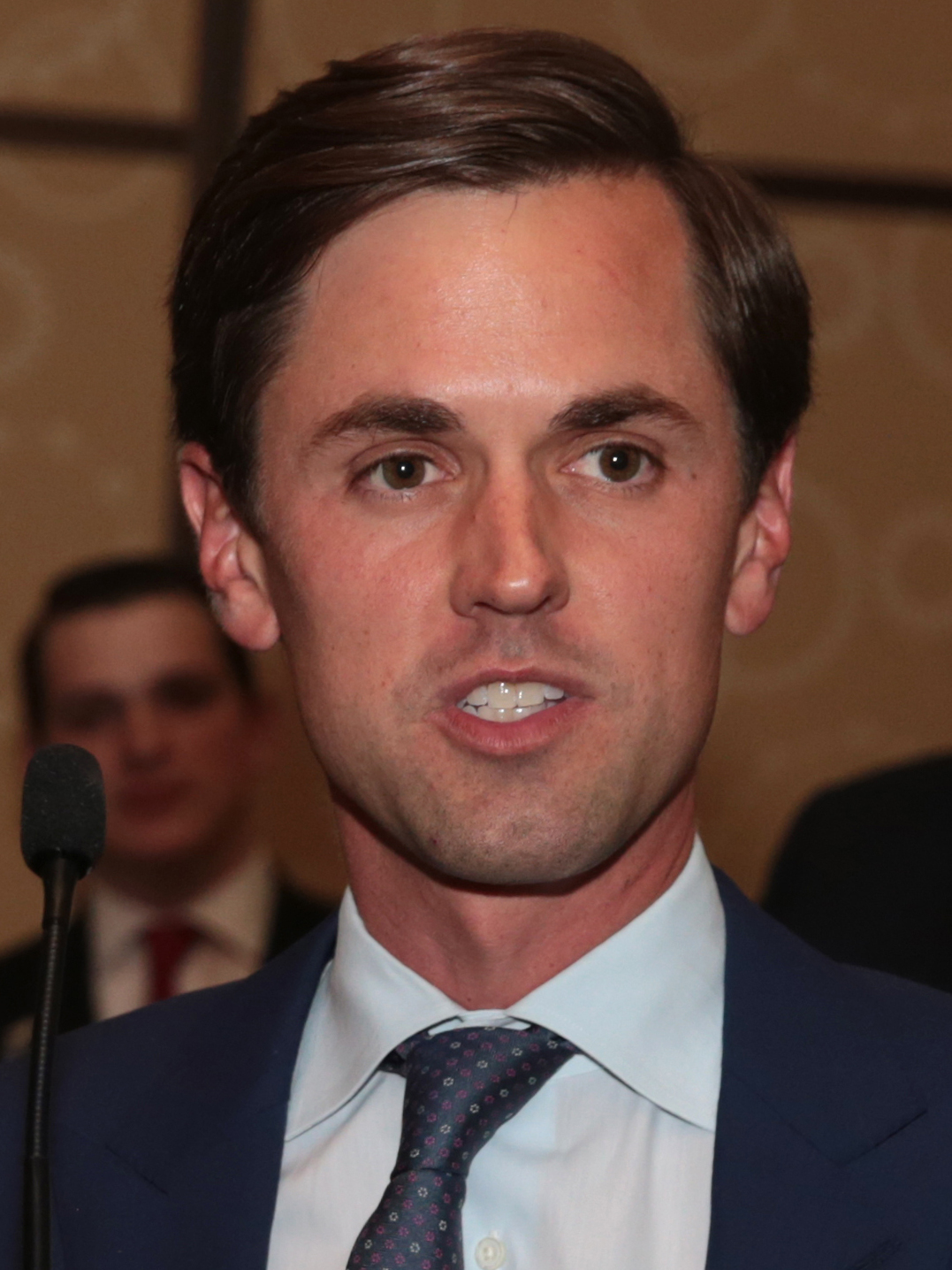

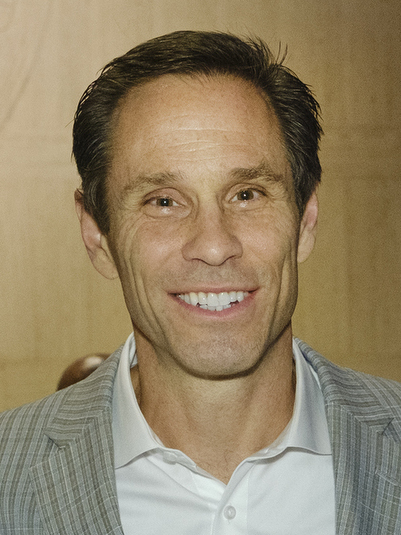
Nominee	Mayes Middleton	Nathan Johnson
Party	Republican	Democratic
Incumbent Attorney General
Ken Paxton
Republican

Attorney General Ken Paxton was re-elected in 2022 with 53.4% of the vote. He is retiring to run for Senate.

== Vermont ==
Vermont Attorney General election
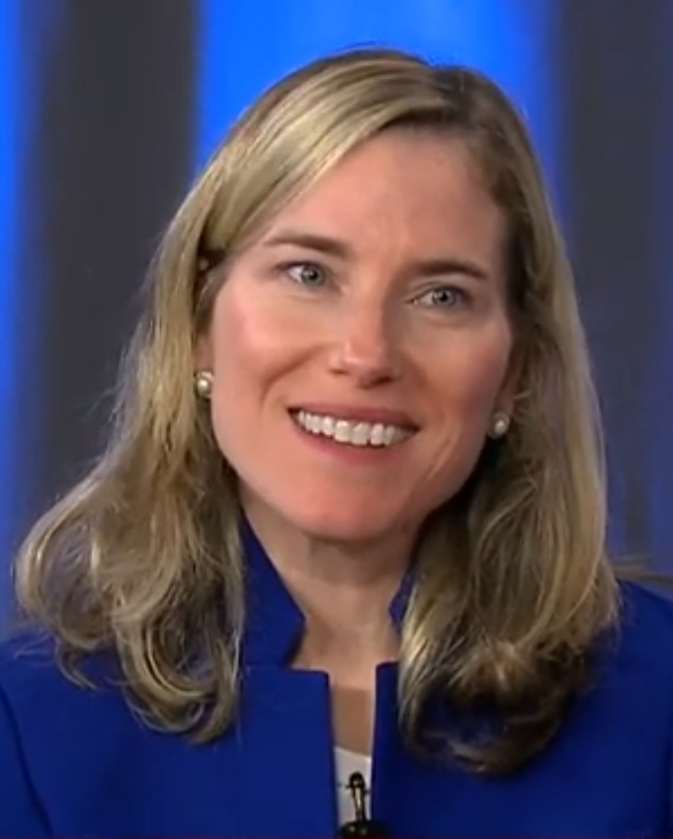

Nominee	Charity Clark	Ed Kemon
Party	Democratic	Republican
Incumbent Attorney General
Charity Clark
Democratic

Attorney General Charity Clark was re-elected in 2024 with 57.9% of the vote. She is running for re-election. She is being challenged by Republican Ed Kemon.

== Wisconsin ==
Wisconsin Attorney General election
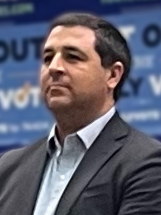

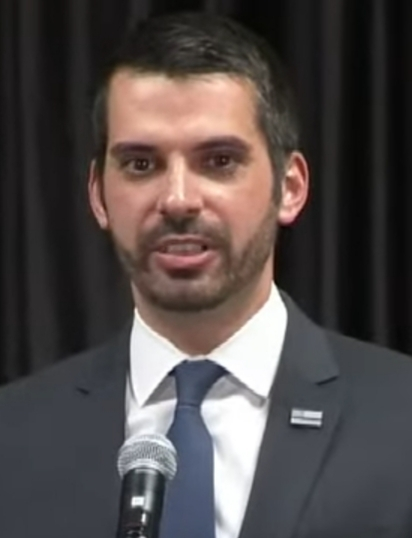
Candidate	Josh Kaul	Eric Toney
Party	Democratic	Republican
Incumbent Attorney General
Josh Kaul
Democratic

Attorney General Josh Kaul was re-elected in 2022 with 50.6% of the vote. He is running for re-election. 2022 Republican nominee Fond du Lac County district attorney Eric Toney is also running.

== Territories and federal district ==
=== District of Columbia ===
District of Columbia Attorney General election
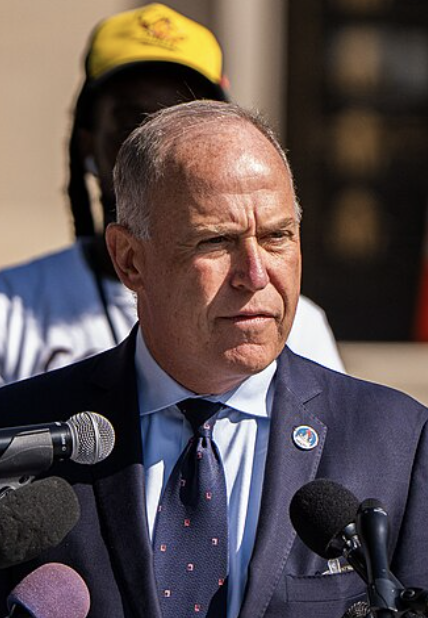

Candidate	Brian Schwalb	Manuel Rivera
Party	Democratic	Republican
Incumbent Attorney General
Brian Schwalb
Democratic

Attorney General Brian Schwalb was elected in 2022 with 97.5% of the vote against a write-in opponent. He is running for re-election to a second term. He is being challenged by Republican Manuel Rivera.

=== Guam ===
Guam Attorney General election
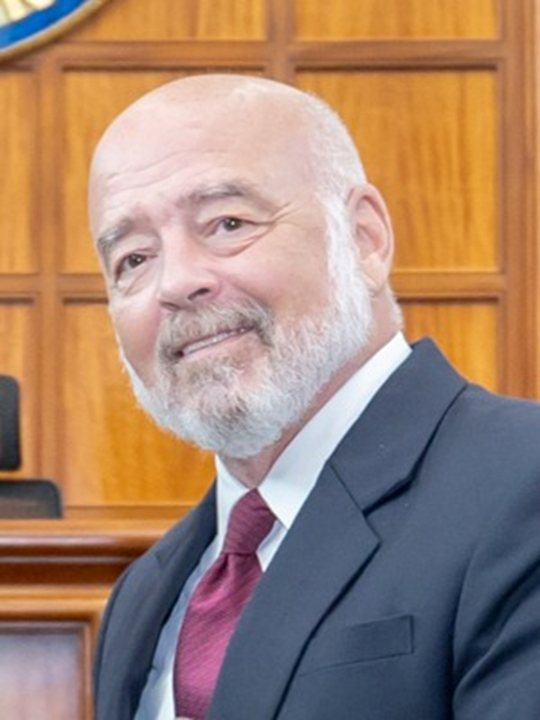

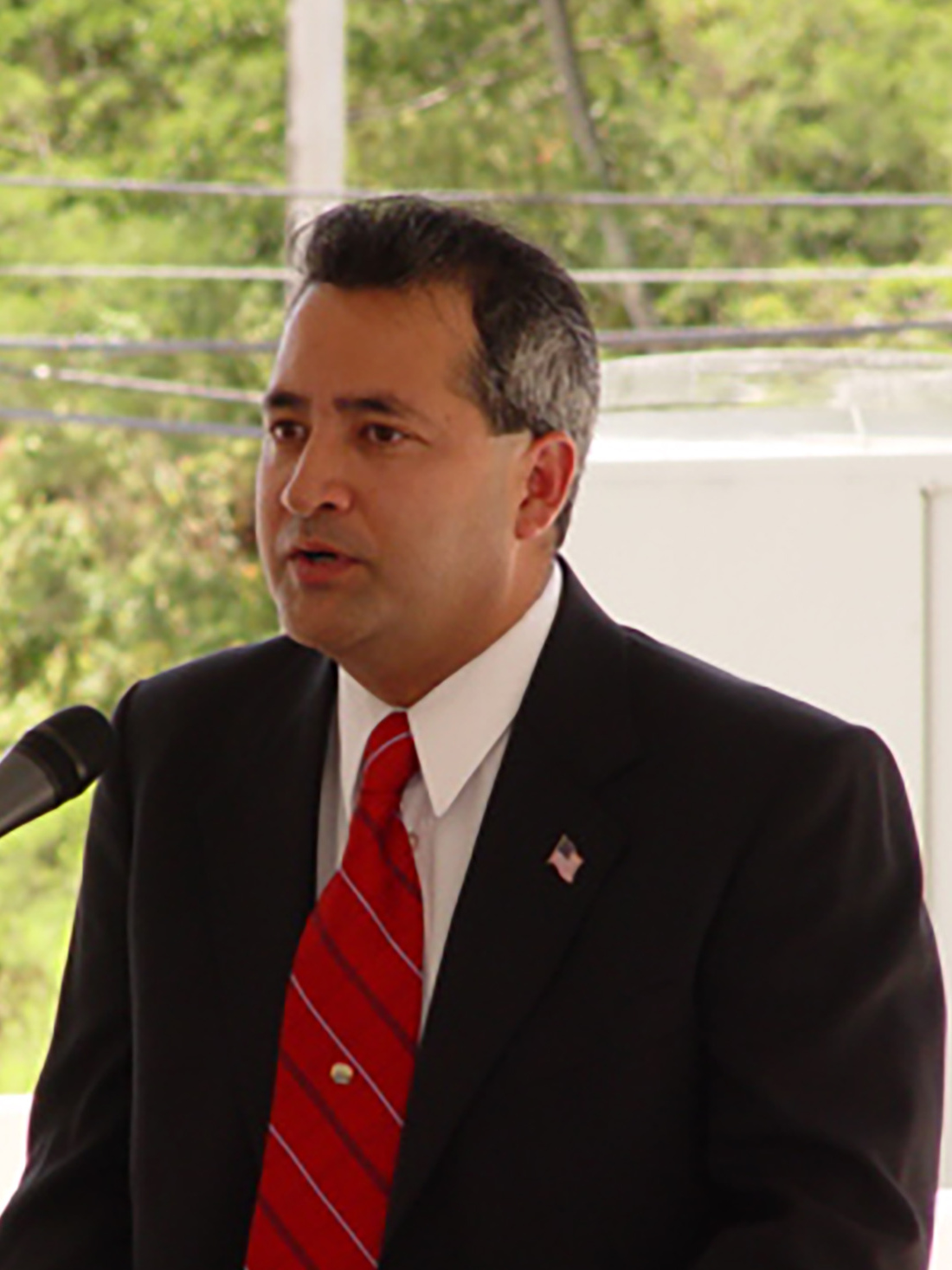

Nominee	Tom Fisher	Douglas Moylan	Jordan Pauluhn
Party	Independent	Independent	Independent
Alliance	Republican	Republican
Nominee	Peter Santos	Phillip Tydingco
Party	Independent	Independent
Incumbent Attorney General
Douglas Moylan
Republican

Attorney General Douglas Moylan was re-elected in 2022 with 46.2% of the vote. After considering a run for governor, he announced he was seeking re-election to a second consecutive term. Republican former legislator Tom Fisher is running for the position.

=== Northern Mariana Islands ===
Northern Mariana Islands Attorney General election
Nominee	Michael Evangelista	Jonathan Glass	Joaquin Torres
Party	Independent	Independent	Independent
Incumbent Attorney General
Edward Manibusan
Democratic

Attorney General Edward Manibusan was re-elected in 2022 with 55.2% of the vote. He is eligible to seek re-election but has instead announced he will not seek re-election.

== See also ==
- 2026 United States elections
