= 2026 Arkansas Attorney General election =

- November 3, 2026
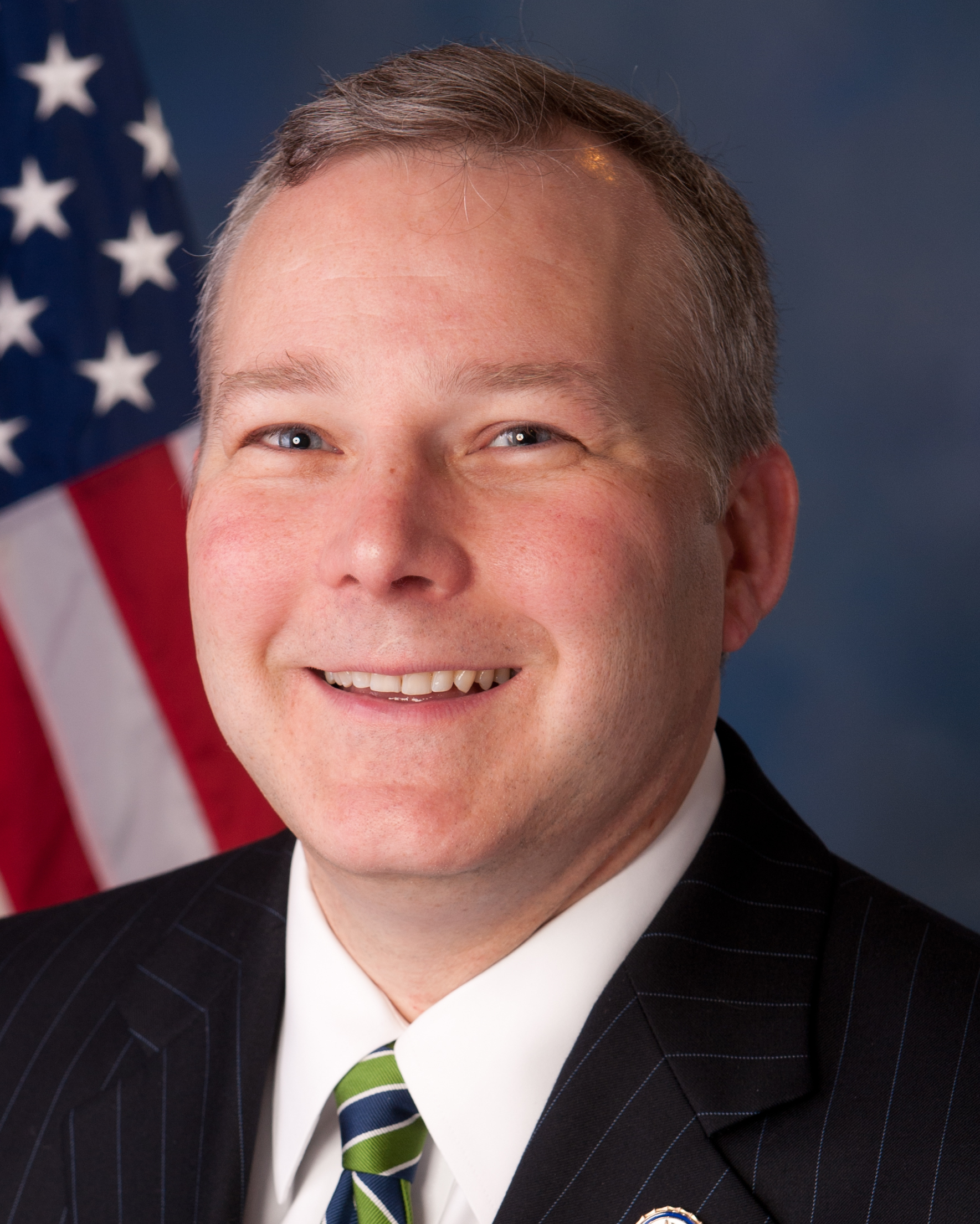
Nominee	Tim Griffin
Party	Republican
Popular vote	620.639
Percentage	100%
- Griffin: 100%
attorney general before election
Tim Griffin
Republican
Elected attorney general
Tim Griffin
Republican

The 2026 Arkansas Attorney General election was held on November 3, 2026, to elect the attorney general of Arkansas. Republican incumbent Tim Griffin won a second term unopposed.

== Republican primary ==
=== Candidates ===
==== Nominee ====
- Tim Griffin, incumbent attorney general (2023–present)

== General election ==
=== Predictions ===
Source	Ranking	As of
Sabato's Crystal Ball	Safe R	August 20, 2026

== Results ==
2026 Arkansas Attorney General election
Party	Candidate	Votes	%	±%
Arkansas Republican Party	Tim Griffin incumbent)			
Total votes			100.00	

== See also ==
- 2026 United States elections
- 2026 Arkansas elections
