= 2026 Idaho Attorney General election =

- November 3, 2026
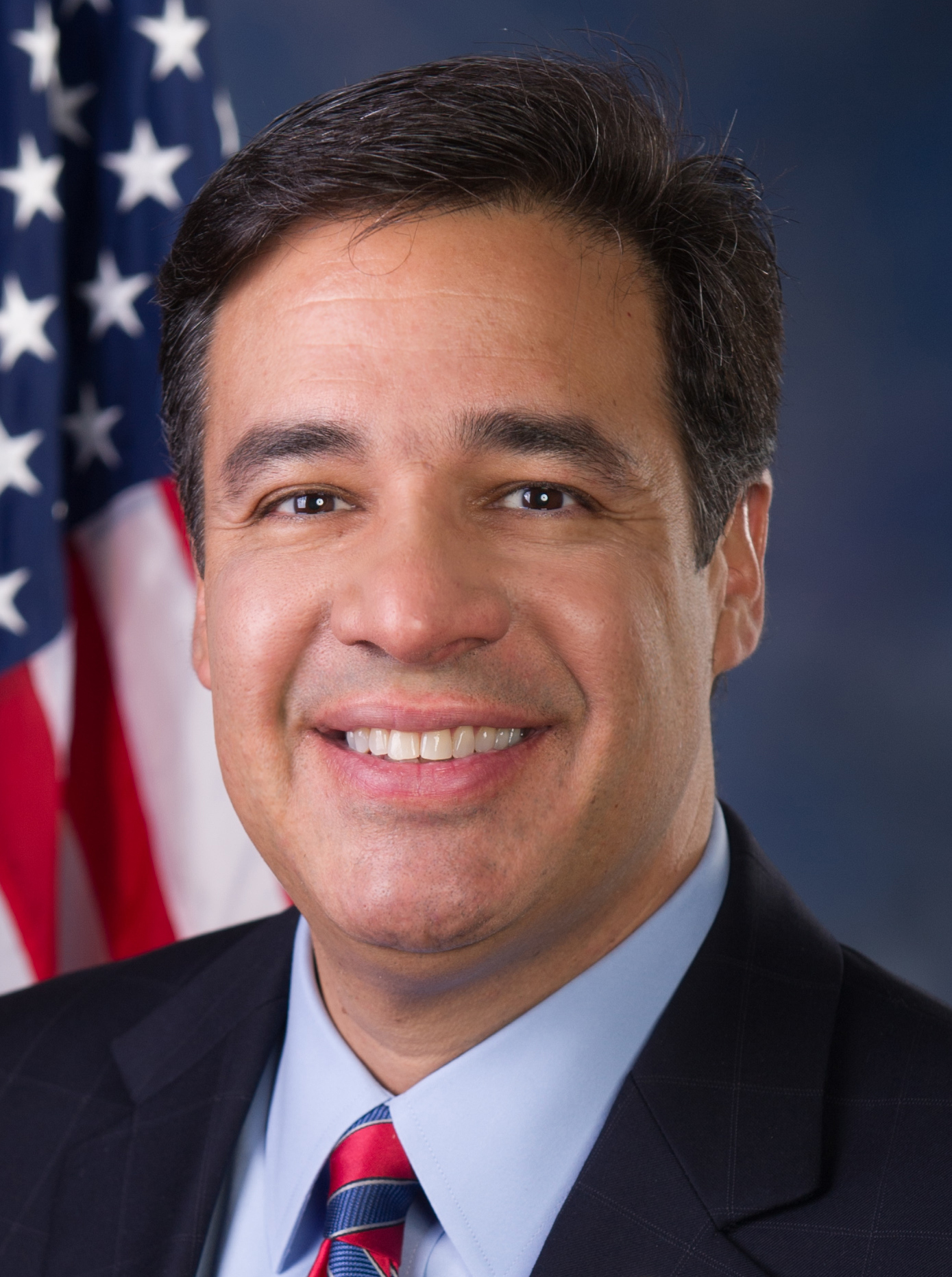

Nominee	Raúl Labrador	Lori Hickman
Party	Republican	Democratic
Popular vote	421,962	283,183
Percentage	59.8%	40.2%
- Labrador: 50–60% 60–70% 70–80% 80–90% Hickman: 50–60% 60–70% 70–80%
Attorney General before election
Raúl Labrador
Republican
Elected Attorney General
Raúl Labrador
Republican

The 2026 Idaho Attorney General election was held on November 3, 2026, to elect the attorney general of Idaho. Republican incumbent Raúl Labrador was elected to a second term. He was challenged by Democratic attorney Lori Hickman.

Labrador and Hickman won their respective primaries unopposed on May 19.

== Republican primary ==
=== Candidates ===
==== Nominee ====
- Raúl Labrador, incumbent attorney general (2023–present)

=== Results ===
Republican primary results
Party	Candidate	Votes	%
Republican	Raúl Labrador (incumbent)	186,106	100.0
Total votes		186,106	100.0

== Democratic primary ==
=== Candidates ===
==== Nominee ====
- Lori Hickman, attorney

=== Results ===
Democratic primary results
Party	Candidate	Votes	%
Democratic	Lori Hickman	43,348	100.0
Total votes		43,348	100.0

== General election ==
=== Predictions ===
Source	Ranking	As of
Sabato's Crystal Ball	Safe R	August 20, 2026

=== Polling ===
Poll source	Date(s) administered	Sample size (Note: Key: A – all adults RV – registered voters LV – likely voters V – unclear)	Margin of error	Raúl Labrador (R)	Lori Hickman (D)	Undecided
Change Research (I) (Note: Poll sponsored by John Stegner, an independent running for governor)	July 28–30, 2026	1,213 (LV)	± 3.0%	49%	31%	20%

== See also ==
- 2026 United States elections
- 2026 Idaho elections

== Notes ==
Partisan clients
