= 2026 South Dakota Attorney General election =

- November 3, 2026
Nominee	Lance Russell
Party	Republican
Incumbent Attorney General
Marty Jackley
Republican

The 2026 South Dakota Attorney General election was held on November 3, 2026, to elect the attorney general of South Dakota. Republican county attorney Lance Russell was the party's nominee and was unopposed in the general election. Republican incumbent Marty Jackley declined to seek a fourth full term and ran for the U.S. House.

== Republican primary ==
=== Candidates ===
==== Nominee ====
- Lance Russell, state's attorney for Fall River and Oglala Lakota, former state senator from the 30th district (2017–2021) and state representative from the 30th district (2009–2017)

==== Eliminated at convention ====
- John Fitzgerald
- Austin Hoffman, state's attorney for McPherson

== General election ==
=== Predictions ===
Source	Ranking	As of
Sabato's Crystal Ball	Safe R	October 26, 2025
