= 2026 Maryland Attorney General election =

- November 3, 2026
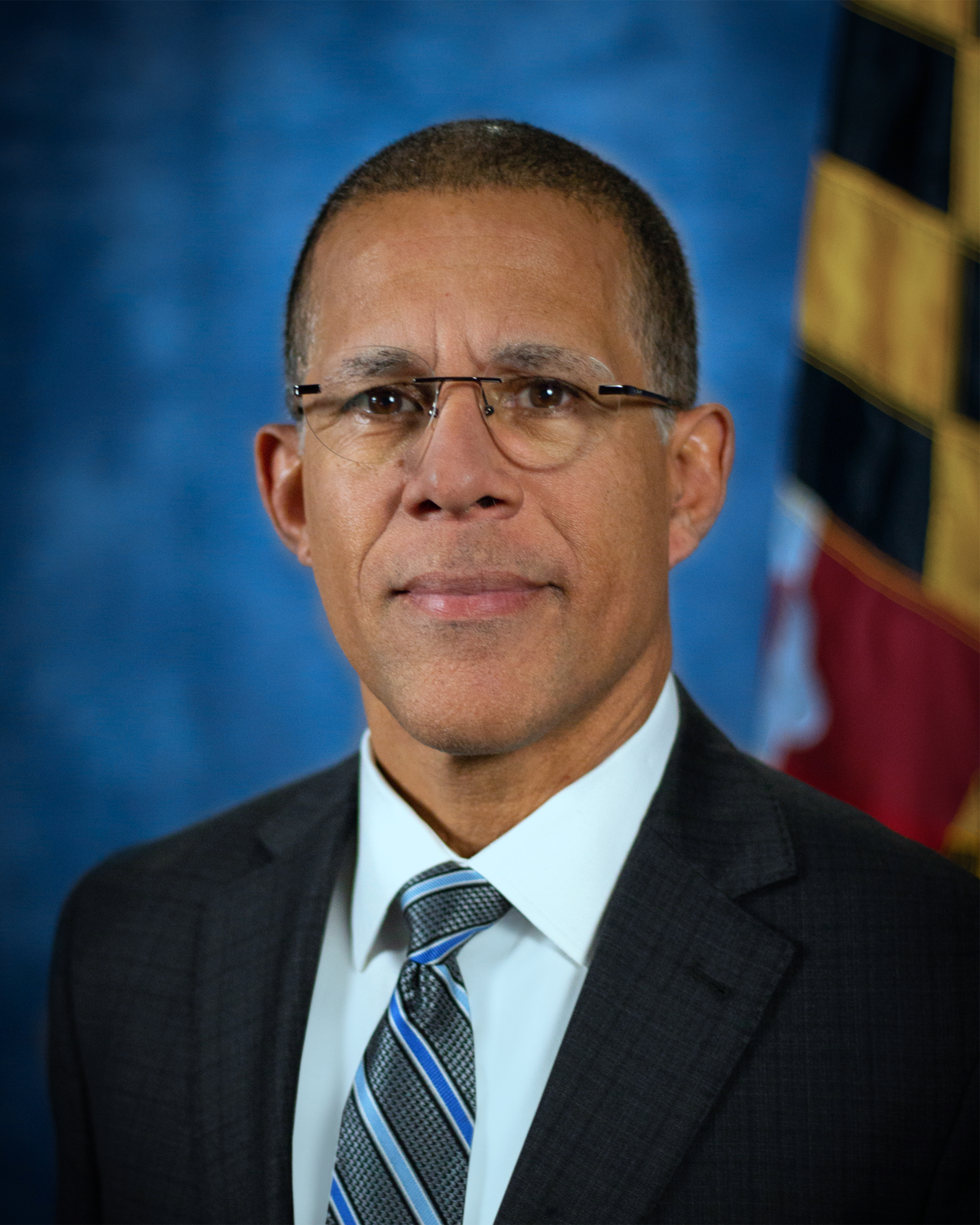

Nominee	Anthony Brown	James Rutledge III
Party	Democratic	Republican
Popular vote	1,416,665	647,345
Percentage	68.6%	31.3%
- Brown: 50–60% 60–70% 70–80% 80–90% >90% Rutledge: 50–60% 60–70% 70–80%
Attorney General of Maryland before election
Anthony Brown
Democratic
Elected Attorney General of Maryland
Anthony Brown
Democratic

The Maryland Attorney General election of 2026 was held on November 3, 2026, to elect the Attorney General of Maryland. Incumbent Democratic Attorney General Anthony Brown was elected to a second term in office.

== Democratic primary ==
=== Nominee ===
- Anthony Brown, incumbent attorney general (2023–present)

=== Endorsements ===
Anthony Brown

Labor unions

- Amalgamated Transit Union Local 689
- Maryland State & DC AFL-CIO
- Maryland State Education Association
- Service Employees International Union Local 500
- United Food and Commercial Workers Local 1994 MCGEO

Organizations

- Black Economic Alliance PAC
- CASA in Action
- Maryland League of Conservation Voters
- Giffords
- Maryland Sierra Club
- Moms Demand Action
- Reproductive Freedom for All
- Vote Vets

Newspapers

- Baltimore Afro-American

=== Fundraising ===
Campaign finance reports as of June 7, 2026
Candidate	Raised	Spent	Cash on hand
Anthony Brown (D)	$993,237	$550,440	$719,228
Source: Maryland State Board of Elections

=== Results ===
Democratic primary results
Party	Candidate	Votes	%
Democratic	Anthony Brown (incumbent)	568,685	100.0
Total votes		568,685	100.0

== Republican primary ==
=== Nominee ===
- James B. Rutledge III, former Bel Air town commissioner (2023–2025) and candidate for U.S. Senate in 2010

=== Endorsements ===
James Rutledge III

Labor unions

- Maryland Fraternal Order of Police

Organizations

- Maryland Right to Life

=== Fundraising ===
Campaign finance reports as of June 7, 2026
Candidate	Raised	Spent	Cash on hand
James Rutledge (R)	$62,082 (Note: $25,000 of this total was self-funded by Rutledge)	$47,509	$14,573
Source: Maryland State Board of Elections

=== Results ===
Republican primary results
Party	Candidate	Votes	%
Republican	James B. Rutledge III	161,800	100.0
Total votes		161,800	100.0

== General election ==
=== Predictions ===
Source	Ranking	As of
Sabato's Crystal Ball	Safe D	August 21, 2025

=== Fundraising ===
Campaign finance reports as of November 10, 2026
Candidate	Raised	Spent	Cash on hand
Anthony Brown (D)	$1,174,472	$617,247	$833,656
James Rutledge (R)	$175,407 (Note: $83,500 of this total was self-funded by Rutledge)	$173,587	$1,819
Source: Maryland State Board of Elections

=== Results ===
2026 Maryland Attorney General election
Party	Candidate	Votes	%	±%
Democratic	Anthony Brown (incumbent)	1,416,665	68.57%	+3.62%
Republican	James B. Rutledge III	647,345	31.33%	−3.57%
Write-in		2,128	0.10%	-0.05%
Total votes		2,066,138	100.0%	N/A

== See also ==
- Elections in Maryland
- 2026 Maryland elections
- 2026 United States elections
