= 2026 New Mexico Attorney General election =

- November 3, 2026
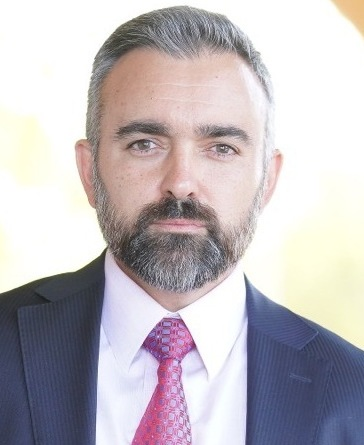

Nominee	Raúl Torrez	Samuel Kane
Party	Democratic	Republican
Popular vote	453,938	266,392
Percentage	63.0%	37.0%
Attorney General before election
Raúl Torrez
Democratic
Elected Attorney General
Raúl Torrez
Democratic

The 2026 New Mexico Attorney General election was held on November 3, 2026, to elect the New Mexico Attorney General. Incumbent Democratic Attorney General Raúl Torrez was re-elected to a second term in office; defeating Republican challenger Samuel Kane. Primaries were held June 2, 2026; with both parties seeing uncontested primaries.

== Democratic primary ==
=== Candidates ===
==== Nominee ====
- Raúl Torrez, incumbent attorney general

=== Results ===
Democratic primary results
Party	Candidate	Votes	%
Democratic	Raúl Torrez (incumbent)	189,828	100.0
Total votes		189,828	100.0

== Republican primary ==
=== Candidates ===
==== Nominee ====
- Samuel Kane, attorney

=== Results ===
Republican primary results
Party	Candidate	Votes	%
Republican	Samuel Kane	96,092	100.0
Total votes		96,092	100.0

== General election ==
=== Predictions ===
Source	Ranking	As of
Sabato's Crystal Ball	Safe D	August 21, 2025

=== Results ===
2026 New Mexico Attorney General election
Party	Candidate	Votes	%	±%
Democratic	Raúl Torrez (incumbent)	453,938	63%	+7.69%
Republican	Samuel Kane, Sr.	266,392	37%	−7.69%
Total votes		720,330	100.0	
Democratic hold				
