= 2002 South Carolina Attorney General election =

- November 5, 2002
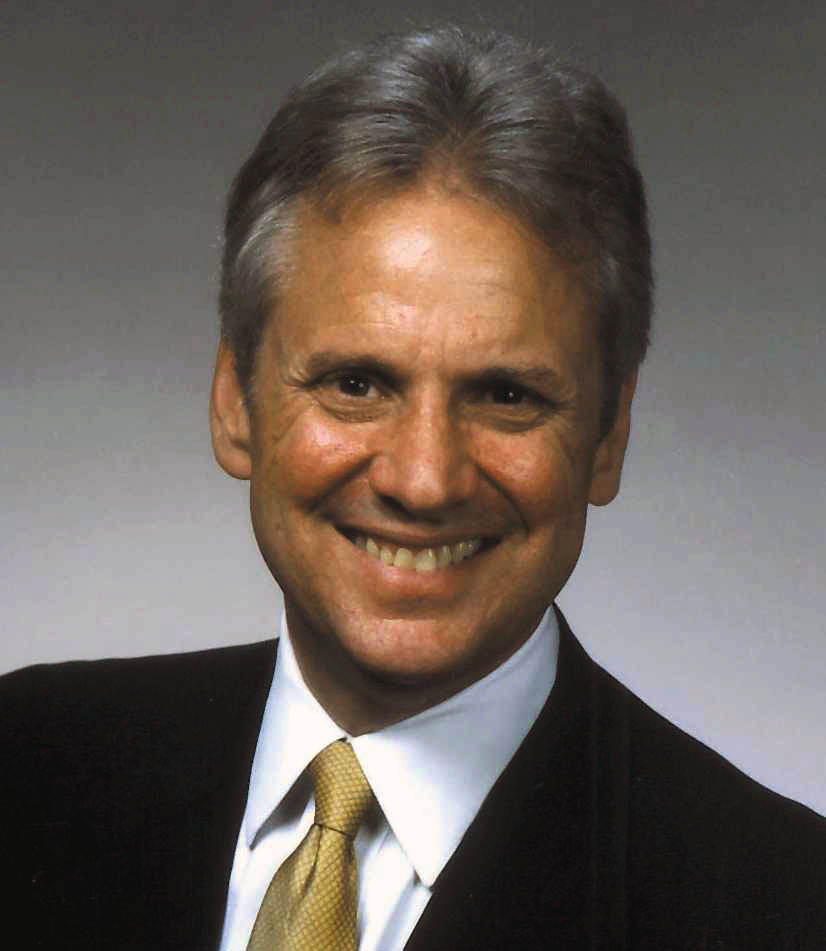

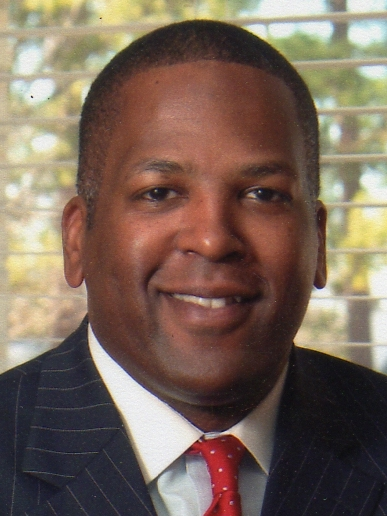
Nominee	Henry McMaster	Steve Benjamin
Party	Republican	Democratic
Popular vote	601,931	482,560
Percentage	55.48%	44.48%
- County results McMaster: 50–60% 60–70% 70–80% Benjamin: 50–60% 60–70% 70–80%
Attorney General before election
Charlie Condon
Republican
Elected Attorney General
Henry McMaster
Republican

The 2002 South Carolina attorney general election was held on November 5, 2002, to elect the South Carolina attorney general. Republican incumbent Charlie Condon chose not to run for re-election, instead unsuccessfully running in the Republican primary for governor of South Carolina. Former chair of the South Carolina Republican Party Henry McMaster won the election, defeating Democratic nominee and director of the South Carolina Department of Probation, Parole, and Pardon Services Steve Benjamin by eleven percentage points.

== Republican primary ==
=== Candidates ===
- Henry McMaster, former chair of the South Carolina Republican Party (1993–2002), 1990 Republican nominee for lieutenant governor, 1986 Republican nominee for U.S. Senate, former U.S. attorney for the District of South Carolina (1981–1985)
- Jon E. Ozmint, attorney
- Larry Richter, former South Carolina state senator (1993–1997)

=== Results ===
Republican primary results
Party	Candidate	Votes	%
Republican	Henry McMaster	126,164	42.41%
Republican	Larry Richter	94,573	31.79%
Republican	Jon E. Ozmint	76,725	25.79%
Total votes		297,462	100.00%

Republican primary runoff results
Party	Candidate	Votes	%
Republican	Henry McMaster	162,014	55.81%
Republican	Larry Richter	128,271	44.19%
Total votes		290,285	100.00%

== Democratic primary ==
=== Candidates ===
- Steve Benjamin, director of the South Carolina Department of Probation, Parole, and Pardon Services (1999–2003)

=== Results ===
Benjamin was unopposed for the nomination.

== General election ==
=== Results ===
2002 South Carolina attorney general election results
Party	Candidate	Votes	%	±%
Republican	Henry McMaster	601,931	55.48%	+1.52%
Democratic	Steve Benjamin	482,560	44.48%	−1.51%
Write-in		498	0.05%	–
Total votes		1,084,989	100.00%	
Republican hold				
