= Justin Bamberg =

American attorney and politician

Member of the South Carolina House of Representatives from the 90th district
- Incumbent
- Assumed office November 10, 2014
- Preceded by: Bakari Sellers

Personal details
- Born: Justin Tyler Bamberg; March 7, 1987 (age 39) Bamberg, South Carolina, U.S.
- Party: Democratic
- Education: University of South Carolina (BA, JD)

Justin Tyler Bamberg (born March 7, 1987) is an American attorney and politician serving as a member of the South Carolina House of Representatives from the 90th district, which includes all of Bamberg County and parts of Orangeburg County.

== Early life and education ==
Bamberg was born in Bamberg, South Carolina March 7, 1987. He earned a Bachelor of Arts degree from the University of South Carolina and a Juris Doctor from the University of South Carolina School of Law in 2011.

== Political career ==
Bamberg serves as a Democratic member of the South Carolina House of Representatives . He serves on the House Judiciary Committee.

Bamberg's predecessor, Bakari Sellers, vacated the South Carolina House of Representatives District 90 seat to run for Lieutenant Governor in 2014. Bamberg defeated Monnie Singleton to win the Democratic Primary. He narrowly defeated Republican Travis Lee Avant by a little over 1% of the vote.

In late 2015, Bamberg initially supported and formally endorsed Hillary Clinton for president. In January 2016, Bamberg pulled his endorsement and formally endorsed Vermont Senator Bernie Sanders, highlighting Sanders' unwavering support of "racial, social and economic justice". Bamberg went on to undertake a role as one of Sanders' national surrogates, appearing with Sanders at events across the country as well as on his behalf.

In 2016, Bamberg successfully defended his seat, defeating Evert Comer, Jr. to win the Democratic Primary, and Republican Dan Lawrence in the general election.

On November 9, 2017, Our Revolution—a national, grassroots organization that emerged in the wake of Senator Sanders' Presidential run—announced that Bamberg had been elected to its national board of directors.

Bamberg was noted in August 2017 to have been "exploring" a possible run for governor in the State of South Carolina, the same stirring conversation on the possibility of the state having its first Democratic governor in over a decade. In 2018 Bamberg had no Democratic primary and was unopposed in the general election.

In 2018 Bamberg had no Democratic primary opponent and was unopposed in the general election.

In April 2019, Bamberg endorsed Bernie Sanders in the 2020 Democratic Party presidential primaries.

In 2020, Bamberg successfully defended his seat, defeating Evert Comer, Jr. to win the Democratic Primary. After a recount, Bamberg narrowly defeated Republican Glenn Posey by less than 1% of the vote.

In 2021, Bamberg was appointed to the South Carolina House of Representatives Redistricting Ad Hoc Committee. After Committee meetings and public hearings, the Committee, along with its Senate counterpart, presented redistricting plans for approval to the full legislature and the Governor. In January 2022, Representative Jerry Govan called for the City of Orangeburg to join a redistricting lawsuit, because the plan moved most of the City of Orangeburg into the District represented by Representative Bamberg.

In June 2022, Bamberg successfully defended his seat, defeating Evert Comer, Jr. to win the Democratic Primary. Redistricting plans were passed by the General Assembly on June 15, 2022, and signed by the Governor on June 17, 2022. In September 2022, Bamberg criticized US Senate Democratic Nominee Krystle Matthews for remarks about white people released by Project Veritas and subsequently by major news outlets. Bamberg joined other South Carolina Democrats in calling for Matthews to resign.

In November 2022, Bamberg went on to defeat Republican Sharon Carter to secure his next term in office.

== Legal work ==
Bamberg works as a personal injury trial lawyer with Bamberg Legal, LLC. He has served as attorney for clients in some of the United States' most high-profile cases, particularly in regards to officer-involved incidents. In addition to the Walter Scott case, Bamberg has represented the families of Alton Sterling in Baton Rouge, Louisiana; Bryant Heyward in Hollywood, South Carolina; and Keith Scott in Charlotte, North Carolina. Bamberg represented the family of 20-year old Kouren-Rodney Bernard Thomas of Raleigh, North Carolina, who was shot and killed by a neighbor when leaving a house party in August 2016 – a shooting that drew comparisons to Trayvon Martin's death in Florida, and "Jane Doe," an Orangeburg County, South Carolina woman who was allegedly coerced into performing a sex act by an on-duty deputy sheriff. In 2017, Bamberg resolved the civil case against the Orangeburg County Sheriff's Office pre-suit for $350,000, stating at the time: "Most officers and the departments in which they serve are amazing, and we should be grateful that they have dedicated their lives to serving and protecting us all; however, we must continue to fight against any abuse of power. And we will play an important role in addressing that issue."

Bamberg took the case of an unarmed, 86-year-old man tasered by an officer with the Town of Kingstree after a traffic stop in rural South Carolina. The police department reported that the elderly man had failed to stop for blue lights and on exiting his vehicle, was tasered by the officers "for his own safety." In less than one month, Bamberg had negotiated a $900,000 legal settlement on behalf of the grandfather for civil rights violations, representing one of the quickest and most substantial pre-suit legal settlements in an officer involved taser case in the history of South Carolina.

During the same time period, Bamberg undertook representing the mother of Del'Quan Seagers, a minor who died in 2015 while in the custody of the South Carolina Department of Juvenile Justice and residing at a wilderness camp operated by AMIKids, Inc., a national non-profit organization operating juvenile wilderness camps and alternative school across the United States. On January 27, 2017, the South Carolina Department of Juvenile Justice and the wilderness camps operated by AMIKids came under tremendous scrutiny after a thorough review and scathing report was issued by the South Carolina Legislative Audit Council, which found numerous failures by the department and company in the operations of the camps for detained juveniles. A day after the report was released, then SCDJJ Director Sylvia Murray resigned. Bamberg's representation helped prompt national discussions on alternative placement facilities for juveniles in the United States.

In addition to his civil rights trial work, Bamberg has successfully represented individuals in personal injury and wrongful death matters, such as the fatal tractor trailer accident that claimed the life of a Bamberg City Councilwoman in 2015, and a Duke University Hospital employee who was sexually assaulted by an unknown assailant while on the job.

=== Walter Scott trial ===
See also Killing of Walter Scott

Bamberg represented the family of police-shooting victim Walter Scott. In October 2015, Bamberg along with L. Chris Stewart of Stewart Seay & Felton in Atlanta, Georgia, negotiated a $6.5 million pre-suit settlement on behalf of the Estate of Walter Scott to resolve claims for wrongful death and civil rights violations. It was the largest pre-suit settlement of its kind in South Carolina history. The former officer, Michael Slager, pled guilty to federal civil rights violations and sentenced to 20 years for the murder of Walter Scott.

=== Kamiyah Mobley case ===
See also Kidnapping of Kamiyah Mobley

In January 2017, news arose that Kamiyah Mobley, who was abducted from a Jacksonville, Florida hospital in 1998 at eight hours old, had been found in Walterboro, South Carolina, having been raised by her abductor under the name Alexis Manigo. Then eighteen, Mobley retained Bamberg to represent her interests, such as working to obtain identification and a Social Security card.

=== Alex Murdaugh trial ===
See also Trial of Alex Murdaugh

On December 16, 2021, Bamberg announced he was representing Johnny Bush, an alleged victim of Alex Murdaugh. Murdaugh is alleged to have stolen $95,000 of Bush's settlement money. Murdaugh was subsequently convicted of the murder of his son and estranged wife in 2023.

==== Motion for new murder trial ====
On September 3, 2023, Murdaugh's attorneys announced that they had evidence to file for a new murder trial . At a press conference held on September 5, 2023, Murdaugh attorneys Dick Harpootlian and Jim Griffin alleged jury tampering by Colleton County Clerk of Court Rebecca Hill, who subsequently released a book on the case, Behind the Doors of Justice: The Murdaugh Murders. They requested an evidentiary hearing to determine whether there should be a new trial. Harpootlian also sent a letter to United States Attorney for the District of Carolina Adair Ford Boroughs requesting a federal investigation of conduct in the case.

Hill hired two attorneys, Bamberg and Will Lewis to represent her in the case.

At a press conference held on March 25, 2024, Hill, standing with attorney Bamberg, submitted her resignation from the post of Colleton County Clerk of Court to Governor Henry McMaster.
