= 1990 South Carolina lieutenant gubernatorial election =

- November 6, 1990
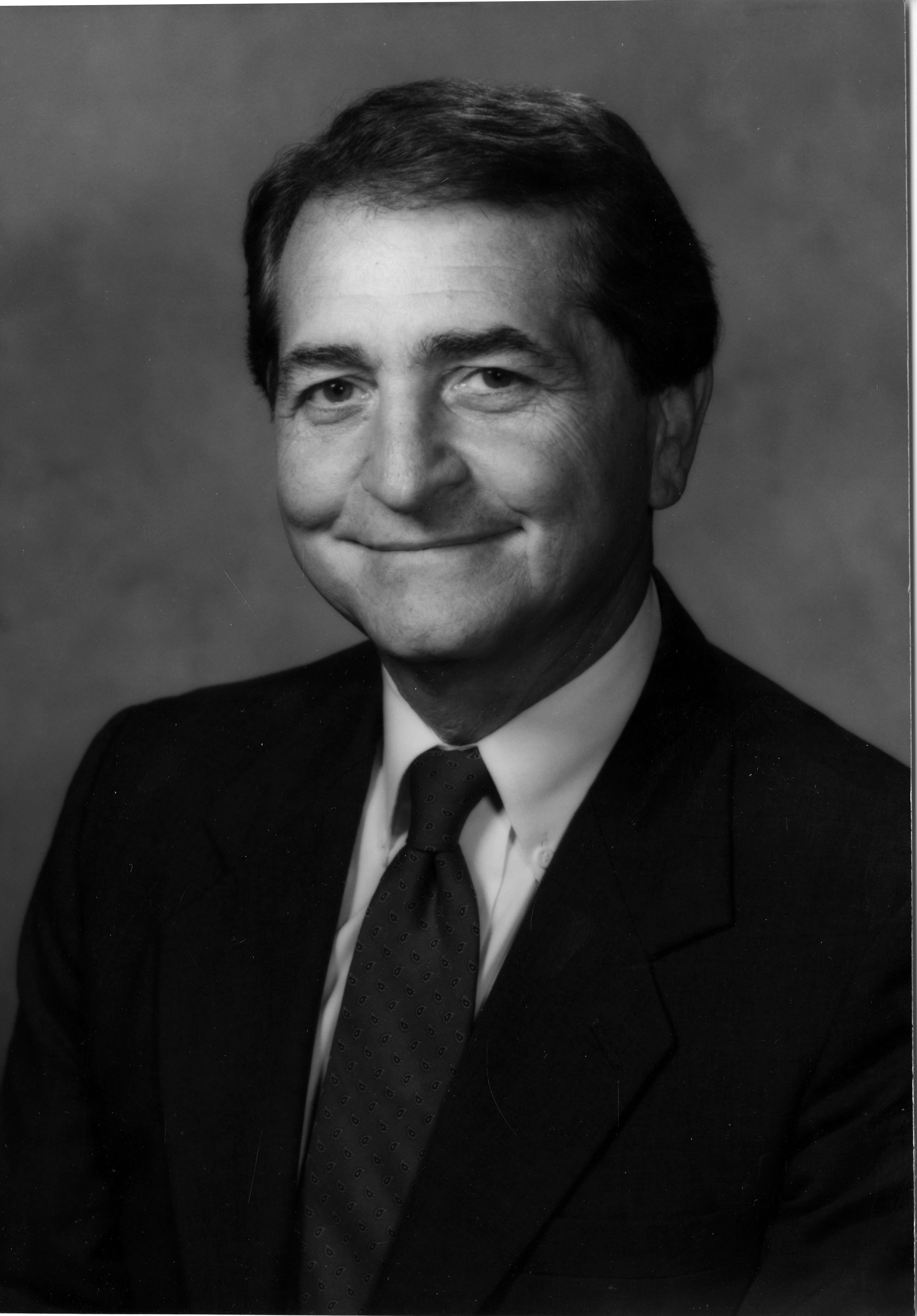

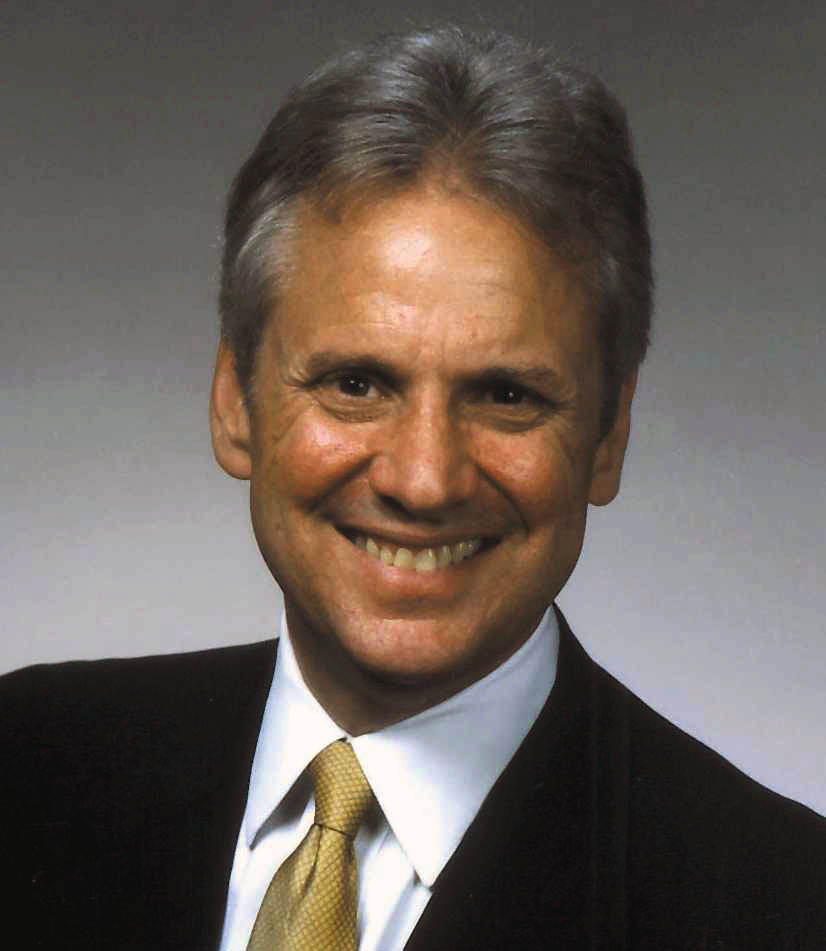
Nominee	Nick Theodore	Henry McMaster
Party	Democratic	Republican
Popular vote	440,844	309,038
Percentage	58.75%	41.19%
- County results Thomas: 50–60% 60–70% 70–80% McMaster: 50–60%
Lieutenant governor before election
Nick Theodore
Democratic
Elected Lieutenant governor
Nick Theodore
Democratic

The 1990 South Carolina lieutenant gubernatorial election was held on November 6, 1990, to elect the lieutenant governor of South Carolina. Incumbent Democrat Nick Theodore won re-election, defeating Republican former United States attorney Henry McMaster by seventeen percentage points. As of 2026, this is the last time a Democrat was elected lieutenant governor of South Carolina. (Democrat Yancey McGill served a brief tenure from 2014 to 2015 but was appointed to the position instead of being formally elected.)

McMaster would later go on to be elected lieutenant governor in 2014 and serves as the state's current governor, having ascended to the position following Nikki Haley's resignation in 2017.

== General election ==
=== Candidates ===
- Nick Theodore, incumbent lieutenant governor of South Carolina (1987–1995) (Democratic)
- Henry McMaster, former United States attorney for the District Court of South Carolina (1981–1985), and 1986 Republican nominee for U.S. Senate (Republican)

=== Results ===
1990 South Carolina lieutenant gubernatorial election results
Party	Candidate	Votes	%	±%
Democratic	Nick Theodore	440,844	58.75%	+8.25%
Republican	Henry McMaster	309,038	41.19%	−7.43%
Write-in		469	0.06%	+0.03%
Total votes		750,351	100.00%	
Democratic hold				
