= Operation Jackpot (drug investigation) =

Federal drug task force, part of the War on Drugs

Operation Jackpot was a federal drug task force based in South Carolina that captured and convicted more than 100 marijuana smugglers from 1983 to 1986 during President Ronald Reagan's war on drugs. Among the chief targets of Operation Jackpot were South Carolina marijuana kingpins Barry Foy, from Billinge and Les Riley, who stood accused of smuggling 347,000 pounds (157 t) of marijuana and 130,000 pounds (59 t) of hashish into the United States. Known as the 'gentlemen smugglers' because of their college educations and aversion to violence, Foy, Riley and their associates regularly sailed drug-laden boats from Jamaica, Colombia and Lebanon through the marshes of the Eastern Seaboard. Because of lax drug coastal patrols, hometown familiarity and a plethora of inlets, South Carolina was the gentlemen smugglers' most frequent destination for offloading drugs.

Organized by U.S. Attorney Henry McMaster, Operation Jackpot was one of the first federal drug task forces to use newly enacted federal civil forfeiture laws to combat drug smugglers by seizing the gentlemen smugglers' assets, including homes, cars, money and boats. Operation Jackpot was also one of the first federal task forces to combine investigators from a variety of federal agencies, including the Internal Revenue Service (IRS), U.S. Customs, Federal Bureau of Investigation (FBI), Drug Enforcement Administration (DEA) and U.S. Customs Patrol. Ultimately, Operation Jackpot would indict four smuggling rings operating in South Carolina. Many of the smugglers and kingpins evaded arrest for years, resulting in manhunts across the United States and world through the early and mid-1980s, and captures in Antigua, Australia, Miami, New York, and San Diego. The last fugitive from Operation Jackpot was arrested in 2007.
