= Bakari Sellers =

American politician

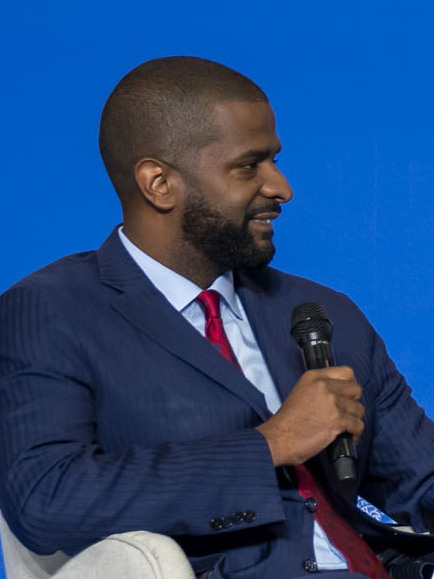
- Sellers in 2024

Member of the South Carolina House of Representatives from the 90th district
- In office December 5, 2006 – December 2, 2014
- Preceded by: Thomas Rhoad Jr.
- Succeeded by: Justin Bamberg

Personal details
- Born: September 18, 1984 (age 42)
- Party: Democratic
- Relatives: Cleveland Sellers (father)
- Education: Morehouse College (BA); University of South Carolina (JD)

Bakari T. Sellers (born September 18, 1984) is an American attorney, podcaster, political commentator, and former politician.

Sellers served in the South Carolina House of Representatives for the 90th District from 2006 to 2014, and was the 2014 Democratic nominee for Lieutenant Governor in South Carolina. Since 2015, Sellers has served as a contributing political commentator on CNN.

== Early life and education ==
Sellers was born on September 18, 1984, and is the son of Gwendolyn Sellers and civil rights activist and professor Cleveland Sellers. He grew up in Bamberg County, South Carolina, and was educated at Orangeburg-Wilkinson High School, a public high school in Orangeburg, South Carolina. In 2005, Sellers earned a Bachelor of Arts degree in African-American Studies from Morehouse College, a private all-male and historically black, liberal arts college, in Atlanta, Georgia. In 2008, he earned a Juris Doctor from the University of South Carolina School of Law. Sellers has worked for Congressman James Clyburn and former Atlanta Mayor Shirley Franklin.

== Career ==
=== Legal career ===
Sellers has been an attorney with the Strom Law Firm, L.L.C. in Columbia, South Carolina since 2007, focusing mostly on personal injury and criminal defense law He is also currently on the boards of directors of Level Brands (a brand management firm) and Let America Vote (a voting rights organization founded by former Missouri Secretary of State Jason Kander).

=== Political career ===
Sellers represented South Carolina's 90th district in the lower house of the state legislature from 2006 to 2014, becoming the youngest African American person elected official in the country at age 22. He vacated his seat in the South Carolina House of Representatives to run for Lieutenant Governor in 2014, but lost to Henry McMaster. He was succeeded in the House by Justin T. Bamberg.

=== Israel advocacy ===
Sellers remains a prominent African-American supporter of Israel. He first attended the annual American Israel Public Affairs Committee (AIPAC) conference while serving as a student body president at Morehouse College. In 2016, he authored a letter signed by 60 fellow African-American politicians urging the Democratic Platform Committee to change its language about Israeli occupation, refusing to include the statement that Israel is engaging in an "occupation" of Palestine that appeared in previous Democratic platforms.

=== 2019 Lincoln Memorial tweet ===
In response to an incident between a teenager, Nicholas Sandmann, and Native American activist Nathan Phillips at the Lincoln Memorial, Sellers tweeted about the teen: "He is a deplorable. Some ppl can also be punched in the face." Sellers deleted the tweet, claiming his comment was "metaphoric" and "taken out of context" though he still claimed that the students "displayed xenophobic, racist behavior." Sellers was later included in a lawsuit brought by the teen's parents against CNN, where Sellers worked as an analyst. CNN settled the lawsuit, rather than face a court trial.

=== Honors, awards, and books ===
In 2010, Time magazine featured Sellers on its 40 Under 40 list. In 2012, Politico named Sellers on its "50 politicos to watch" list.

Sellers was named HBCU Top 30 Under 30 in July 2014.

In May 2020, Sellers released an autobiography, My Vanishing Country, that centers on the forgotten lives of African-American working-class people in the rural U.S. South.

On April 23, 2024, his book, The Moment: Thoughts on the Race Reckoning That Wasn't and How We All Can Move Forward Now was released.

Sellers ranked number 17 on The Post and Courier's "Columbia's 2025 Power List."

== Personal life ==
In the summer of 2015, he married Ellen Rucker Carter, chiropractor and co-owner of Rucker Roots haircare products. He has twins, a boy and a girl, born in 2018.

Party political offices
| Preceded by Ashley Cooper | Democratic nominee for Lieutenant Governor of South Carolina; 2014 | Succeeded by Mandy Powers Norrell |
