= Thomas Rhoad Jr. =

American politician

Member of the South Carolina House of Representatives from the 90th District
- In office 1983–2007
- Succeeded by: Bakari Sellers

Personal details
- Born: Thomas Nathaniel Rhoad Jr. July 16, 1923 Bamberg County, South Carolina, U.S.
- Died: March 14, 2013 (aged 89) Branchville, South Carolina, U.S.

Thomas Nathaniel Rhoad Jr. (July 16, 1923 – March 14, 2013) was an American farmer and politician.

== Early life ==
Born in Bamberg County, South Carolina, Rhoad served in the United States Navy during World War II.

== Career ==
Rhoad was a farmer and worked with the United States Post Office. He also served as a member of the Bamberg County Council. He served in the South Carolina House of Representatives as a Democrat from 1983 to 2007.

During his 24-year-long tenure in the South Carolina House of Representatives, Rhoad worked to pass laws on turkey hunting, drug abuse and tax incentives for job creation. Rhoad was also involved in oversight of House personnel and facilities. He was a longtime chairman of the Agricultural, Natural Resources and Environmental Affairs Committees. He died on March 14, 2013.
