= Henry McMaster =

Governor of South Carolina since 2017

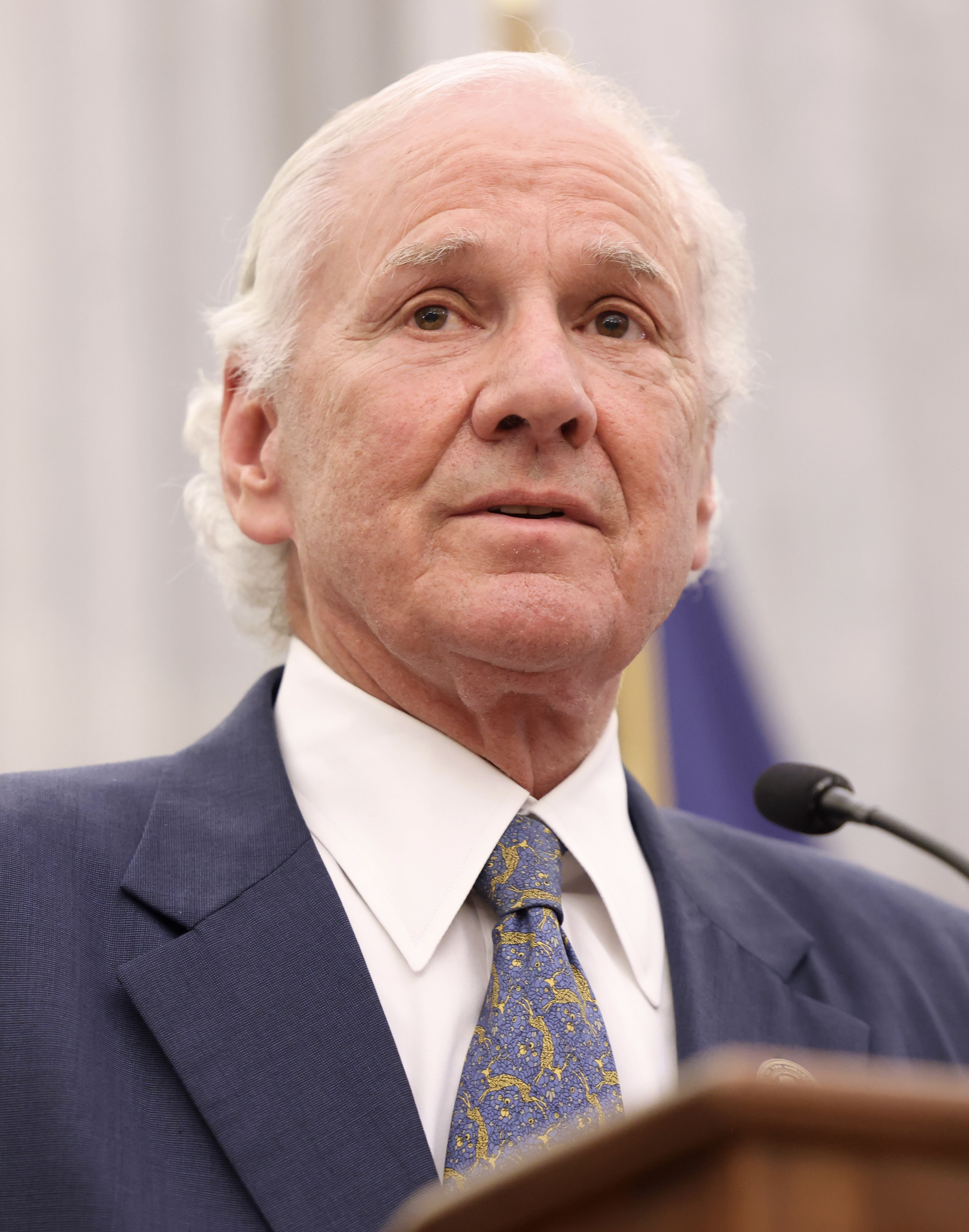
- McMaster in 2026

117th Governor of South Carolina
- Incumbent
- Assumed office January 24, 2017
- Lieutenant: Kevin L. Bryant; Pamela Evette
- Preceded by: Nikki Haley

91st Lieutenant Governor of South Carolina
- In office January 14, 2015 – January 24, 2017
- Governor: Nikki Haley
- Preceded by: Yancey McGill
- Succeeded by: Kevin L. Bryant

50th Attorney General of South Carolina
- In office January 15, 2003 – January 12, 2011
- Governor: Mark Sanford
- Preceded by: Charlie Condon
- Succeeded by: Alan Wilson

Chair of the South Carolina Republican Party
- In office May 8, 1993 – March 28, 2002
- Preceded by: Barry Wynn
- Succeeded by: Katon Dawson

United States Attorney for the District of South Carolina
- In office June 5, 1981 – 1985
- President: Ronald Reagan
- Preceded by: Thomas E. Lydon, Jr.
- Succeeded by: Vinton Lide

Personal details
- Born: Henry Dargan McMaster; May 27, 1947 (age 79) Columbia, South Carolina, U.S.
- Party: Republican
- Spouse: Peggy McAbee (m. 1978)
- Children: 2
- Education: University of South Carolina (BA, JD)
- Website: Campaign website

Military service
- Allegiance: United States
- Branch/service: United States Army; Army Reserve
- Years of service: 1969–1975
- McMaster's voice McMaster announcing Brian Lamkin's appointment as state inspector general. Recorded April 18, 2017

Henry Dargan McMaster (born May 27, 1947) is an American politician and attorney serving since 2017 as the 117th governor of South Carolina. A member of the Republican Party, he served from 2003 to 2011 as the 50th attorney general of South Carolina and from 2015 to 2017 as the 91st lieutenant governor of South Carolina, under Governor Nikki Haley.

Born in Columbia, South Carolina, McMaster graduated from the University of South Carolina with a Bachelor of Arts. After earning a Juris Doctor from the University of South Carolina School of Law, he worked for U.S. Senator Strom Thurmond in private legal practice and as a federal prosecutor. Appointed United States attorney for the District of South Carolina by President Ronald Reagan in 1981, he gained attention for investigating South Carolina marijuana smugglers in Operation Jackpot.

After two unsuccessful statewide campaigns, for U.S. Senate in 1986 and lieutenant governor in 1990, McMaster chaired the South Carolina Republican Party from 1993 to 2002. He was elected attorney general in 2002 and reelected in 2006. He ran for governor in 2010 but lost to Haley in the Republican primary. In 2011, Haley appointed him to the South Carolina Ports Authority. McMaster was elected lieutenant governor of South Carolina in 2014. He became governor in 2017 upon Haley's resignation to become U.S. ambassador to the United Nations. He was elected to full term in 2018 after narrowly winning a runoff for the Republican nomination, and reelected in 2022.

On January 29, 2025, McMaster became South Carolina's longest-serving governor. He is also the third-longest serving incumbent governor in the United States. On April 17, 2025, President Donald Trump appointed McMaster to the Homeland Security Advisory Council.

== Early life ==
McMaster was born on May 27, 1947, in Columbia, South Carolina. He is the eldest son of John Gregg and Ida Dargan (Pet) McMaster. He received a Bachelor of Arts degree in history from the University of South Carolina in 1969, and was a member of the Kappa Alpha Order fraternity. In 1973, he received a Juris Doctor from the University of South Carolina School of Law, where he served on the editorial board of the South Carolina Law Review. Later that year, he was admitted to the Richland County Bar Association of the South Carolina Bar. He served in the United States Army Reserve, receiving an honorable discharge in 1975.

Upon graduation from law school, McMaster worked as a legislative assistant to U.S. senator Strom Thurmond in Washington, D.C., until 1974, when he joined the firm of Tompkins and McMaster. McMaster practiced law for almost 29 years, both as a federal prosecutor and in private practice, representing clients in the state and federal courts, trial and appellate.

On April 13, 1993, Thurmond's 22-year-old daughter Nancy was killed by a drunk driver while jaywalking in Columbia, South Carolina. The driver, Corinne Koenig, immediately phoned McMaster, her attorney, and he was present at the scene as Nancy Thurmond was transported to the hospital. After learning the victim's identity, McMaster realized he had a conflict of interest and withdrew from the case.

== Early political career ==
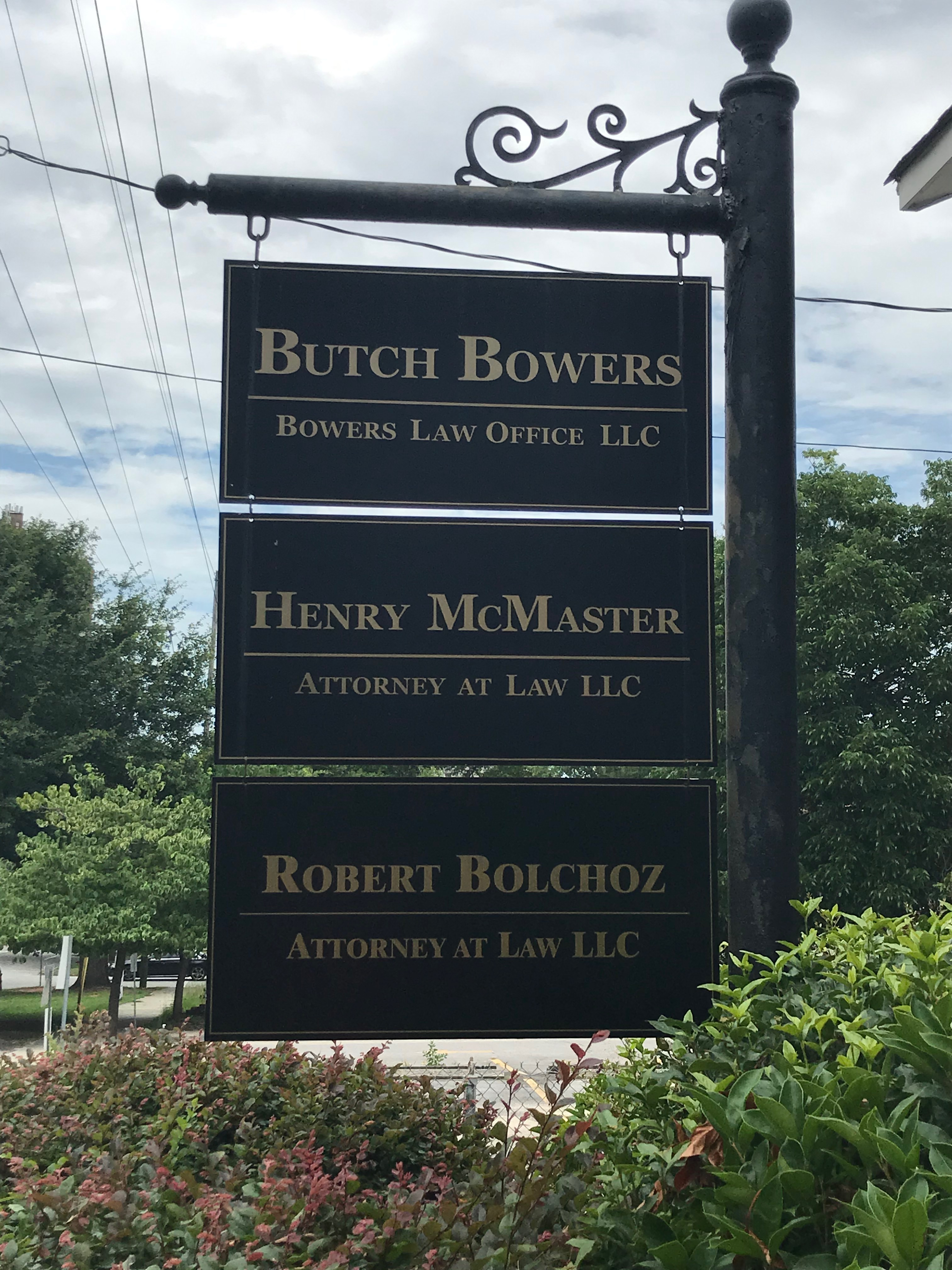
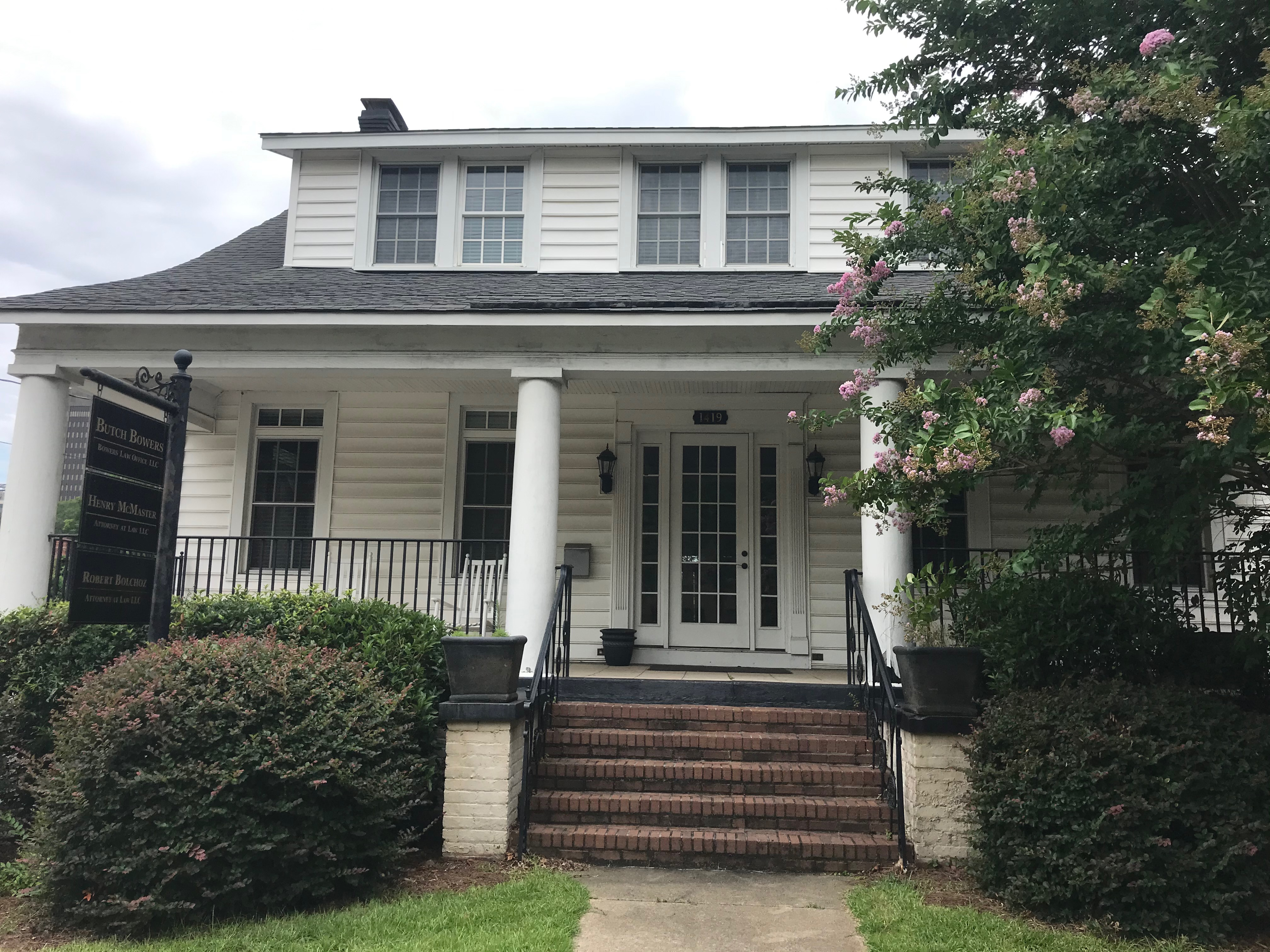
McMaster's law firm on Pendleton St. in Columbia, SC

=== United States attorney ===
Upon Thurmond's recommendation, President Ronald Reagan nominated McMaster as United States attorney for the District of South Carolina in 1981—Reagan's first nomination for U.S. attorney. The Senate confirmed McMaster on May 21, 1981. He headed the South Carolina Law Enforcement Coordinating Committee from 1981 to 1985.

During his tenure, McMaster created the federal drug task force Operation Jackpot to investigate South Carolina marijuana smugglers. Operation Jackpot ultimately arrested more than 100 people for crimes related to marijuana and hashish trafficking. McMaster held numerous press conferences during the operation and gained publicity through interviews and comments. His actions were criticized as political, with journalist Lee Bandy writing, "no one can recall any other U.S. attorney being so public-relations conscious" and noting that McMaster had held more press conferences and news releases than all his predecessors combined. McMaster completed his term as U.S. attorney in 1985.

=== Election bids and state appointments ===
In 1986, McMaster won the Republican primary for the United States Senate against Henry Jordan, 27,695 votes (53.4%) to 24,164 (46.6%). McMaster lost the general election to Democratic incumbent Fritz Hollings, 465,511 votes (63.1%) to 262,976 (35.6%). He only managed to carry Lexington County.

In 1990, McMaster ran for lieutenant governor. He defeated Sherry Shealy Martschink in the Republican primary, 49,463 votes (51.46%) to 46,660 (48.54%), but again lost to the Democratic incumbent. He received 309,038 votes (41.19%) to Nick Theodore's 440,844 (58.75%).

In 1991, Governor Carroll A. Campbell Jr. appointed McMaster to the state's Commission on Higher Education, and the South Carolina Senate confirmed him. He also served on the board of directors of the nonprofit South Carolina Policy Council from 1991 to 2003, serving as board chairman from 1992 to 1993. McMaster left the Ports Authority in 2015.

=== South Carolina Republican Party chair ===
On May 8, 1993, McMaster was elected chairman of the South Carolina Republican Party. He was reelected by the State Republican Convention in 1996, 1998 and 2000. In this capacity, he also served as a member of the Republican National Committee from 1993 to 2002. Under McMaster's chairmanship, the Republican Party captured the governorship, several statewide offices and (with party switches) the State House of Representatives in 1994, and finally captured control of the powerful State Senate in 2000. Under McMaster, the South Carolina GOP also ran highly contentious and successful presidential primaries in 1996 (won by Bob Dole) and 2000 (won by George W. Bush). On March 28, 2002, McMaster announced his resignation as party chairman so that he could run for attorney general.

== Attorney General of South Carolina (2003–2011) ==
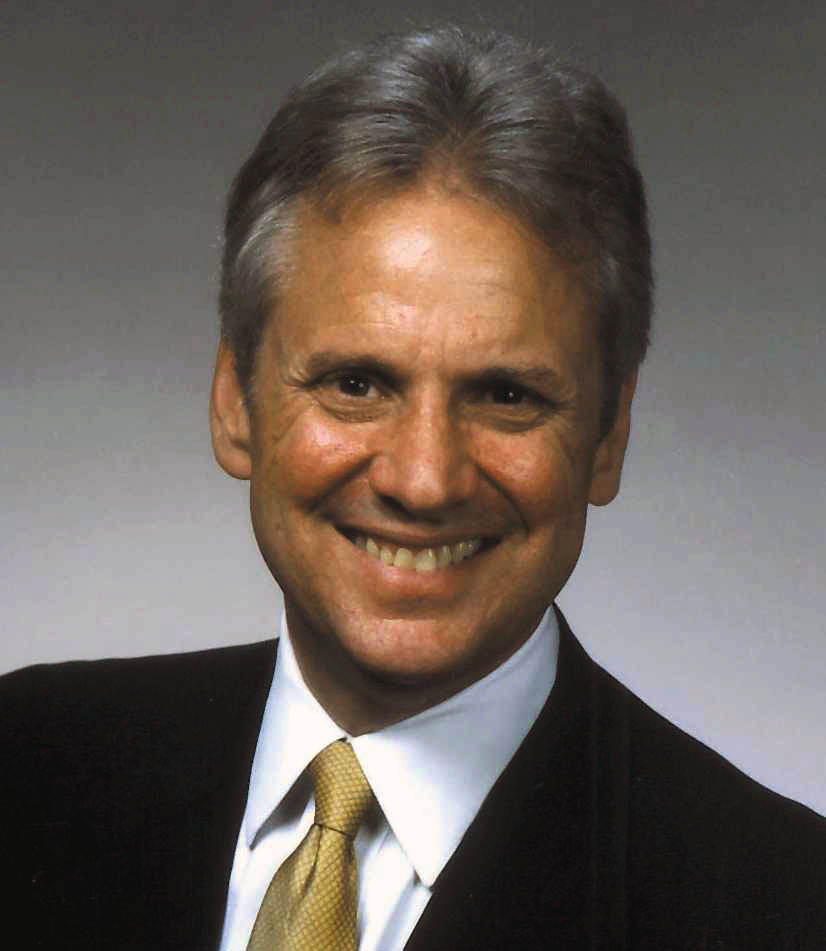
Henry McMaster's official portrait, 2005

McMaster placed first in the Republican primary for attorney general, with 126,164 votes (42.41%), ahead of State Senator and former judge Larry Richter and attorney Jon E. Ozmint. He defeated Richter in the runoff, 162,014 votes (55.8%) to 128,271 (44.2%). In the general election, McMaster defeated Democratic attorney and former director of the South Carolina Department of Probation, Parole and Pardon Services Stephen K. Benjamin, 601,931 votes (55.5%) to 482,560 (44.5%) in the 2002 South Carolina attorney general election. He was reelected in 2006, unopposed in both the Republican primary and the general election.

== Run for governor; Ports Authority ==
In 2010, McMaster ran for governor, but finished third in the Republican primary with 71,187 votes (16.94%), ahead of Lieutenant Governor André Bauer's 52,324 (12.45%) but behind U.S. representative Gresham Barrett's 91,461 (21.76%) and state representative Nikki Haley's 205,360 (48.86%). He immediately endorsed Haley, who had been the front-runner throughout the race and defeated Barrett in the runoff by a landslide.

In 2011, Haley appointed McMaster to the South Carolina Ports Authority, succeeding Harry Butler Jr. and was replaced by Kurt D. Grindstaff.

=== Campaign finance violation ===
On January 6, 2015, the Ethics Commission of South Carolina accused McMaster of accepting about $70,000 in donations to his 2010 campaign for governor, exceeding South Carolina's limit for donations by $51,850. The commission released documents stating that McMaster accepted these extra funds to help settle campaign debt. In September 2015, the commission refused to dismiss the complaint and McMaster's attorney indicated McMaster was likely to settle. In March 2016, the commission ordered McMaster "to repay $72,700 in excess campaign contributions from his 2010 run for governor and pay a $5,100 fine."

== Lieutenant Governor of South Carolina (2015–2017) ==
McMaster filed to run for lieutenant governor of South Carolina on March 27, 2014. He received 44% of the vote in a four-way Republican Party primary, forcing a runoff between him and Mike Campbell, son of former governor Carroll A. Campbell Jr. McMaster defeated Campbell with 63.6% of the vote and faced Democratic state representative Bakari Sellers in the general election. During the campaign, Sellers challenged McMaster to renounce his 30-year membership in Columbia's Forest Lake Country Club, a private country club alleged to exclude black members; in response, McMaster's campaign manager said that the club "[had] no policies of racial discrimination" and that McMaster "would not be a member if it did." On November 4, 2014, McMaster was elected lieutenant governor with 58.8% of the vote. Upon his inauguration, he succeeded Democrat Yancey McGill. (Note: McGill was a Democrat as lieutenant governor, though he was not elected to the position. He became lieutenant governor after Glen McConnell's resignation.)

McMaster was elected on a separate ticket from Governor Haley, the last time a lieutenant governor was elected in this manner; as of 2018, candidates for governor and lieutenant governor run on the same ticket. During the 2016 presidential campaign, McMaster was an early and avid supporter of Donald Trump. He claimed to be the first elected politician in the United States to support Trump. After Trump won the Republican nomination, McMaster delivered the nominating speech at the Republican National Convention.

== Governor of South Carolina (2017–present) ==
=== Appointment and elections ===
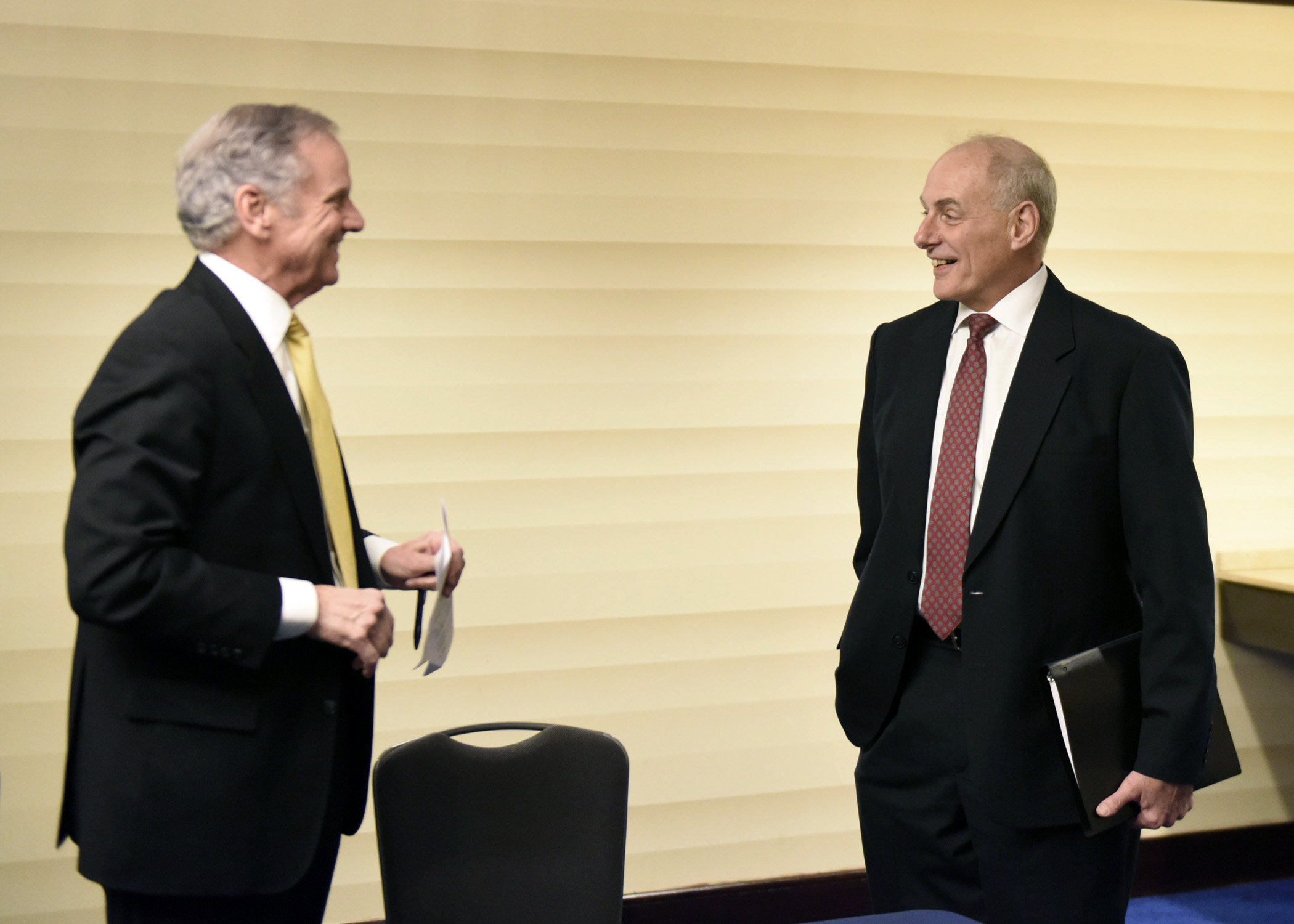
McMaster meeting with John F. Kelly, the United States secretary of homeland security, in February 2017

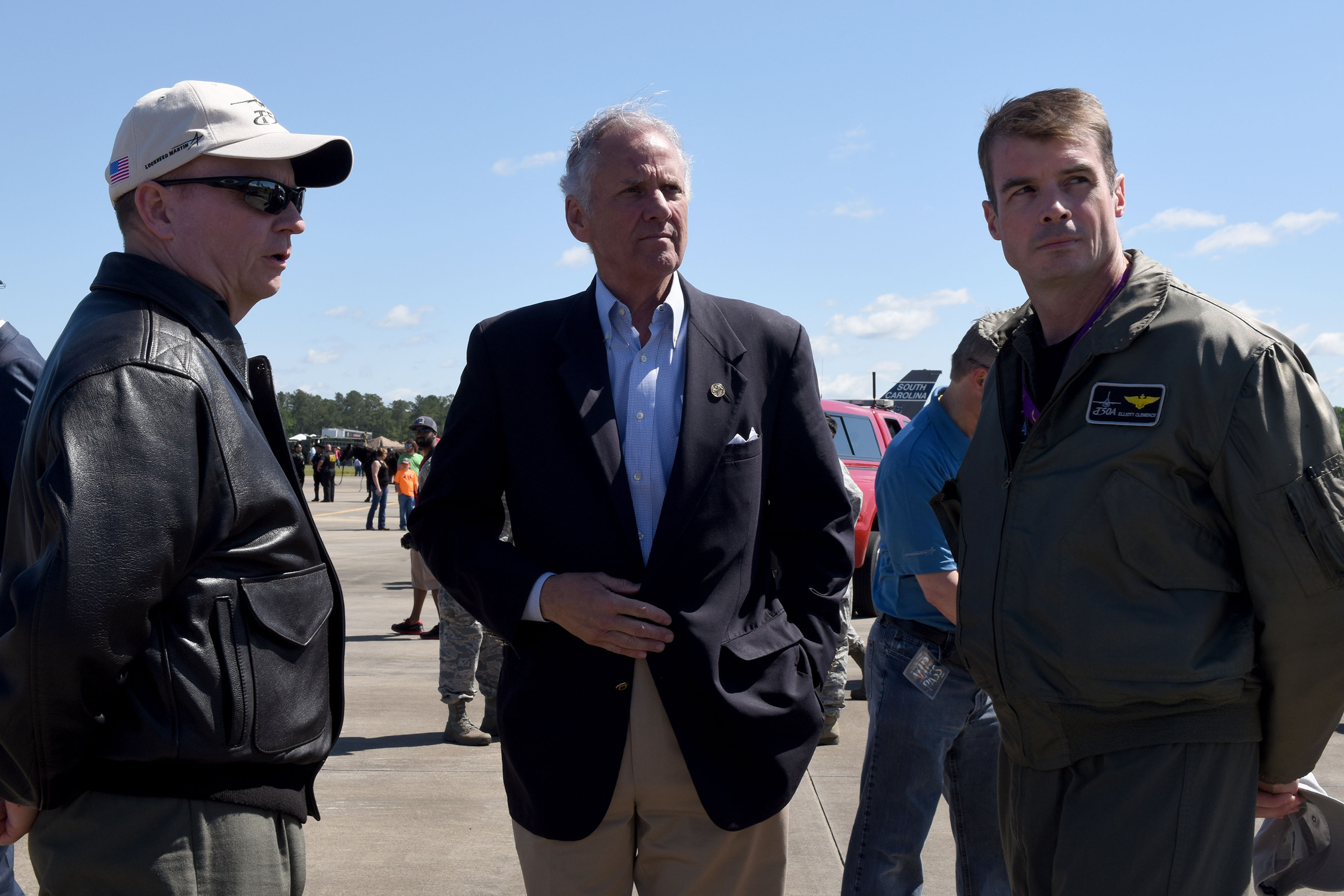
McMaster (center) visits the South Carolina National Guard Air and Ground Expo at McEntire Joint National Guard Base, May 2017

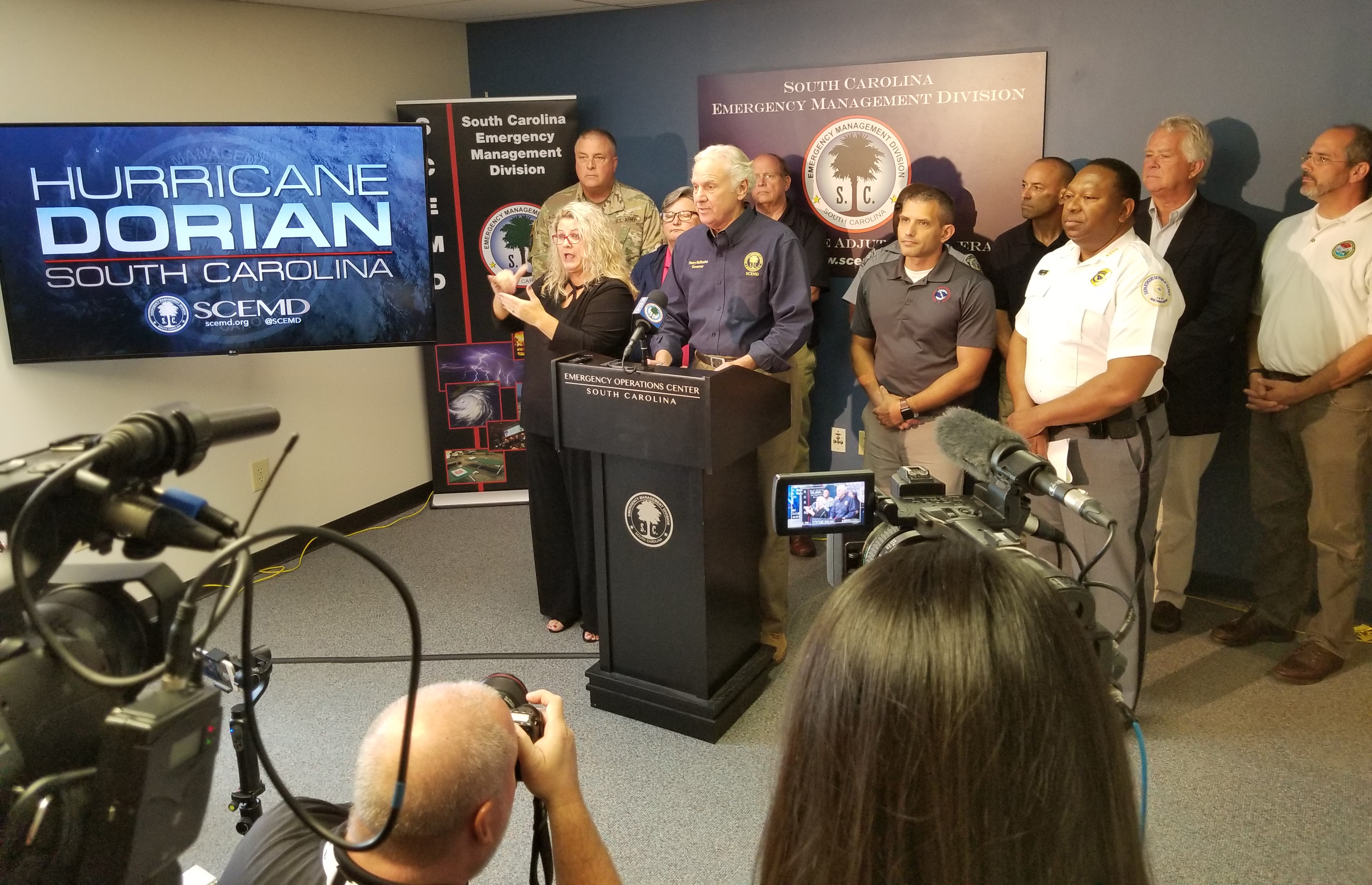
McMaster briefs press on South Carolina's emergency response to Hurricane Dorian, 2019

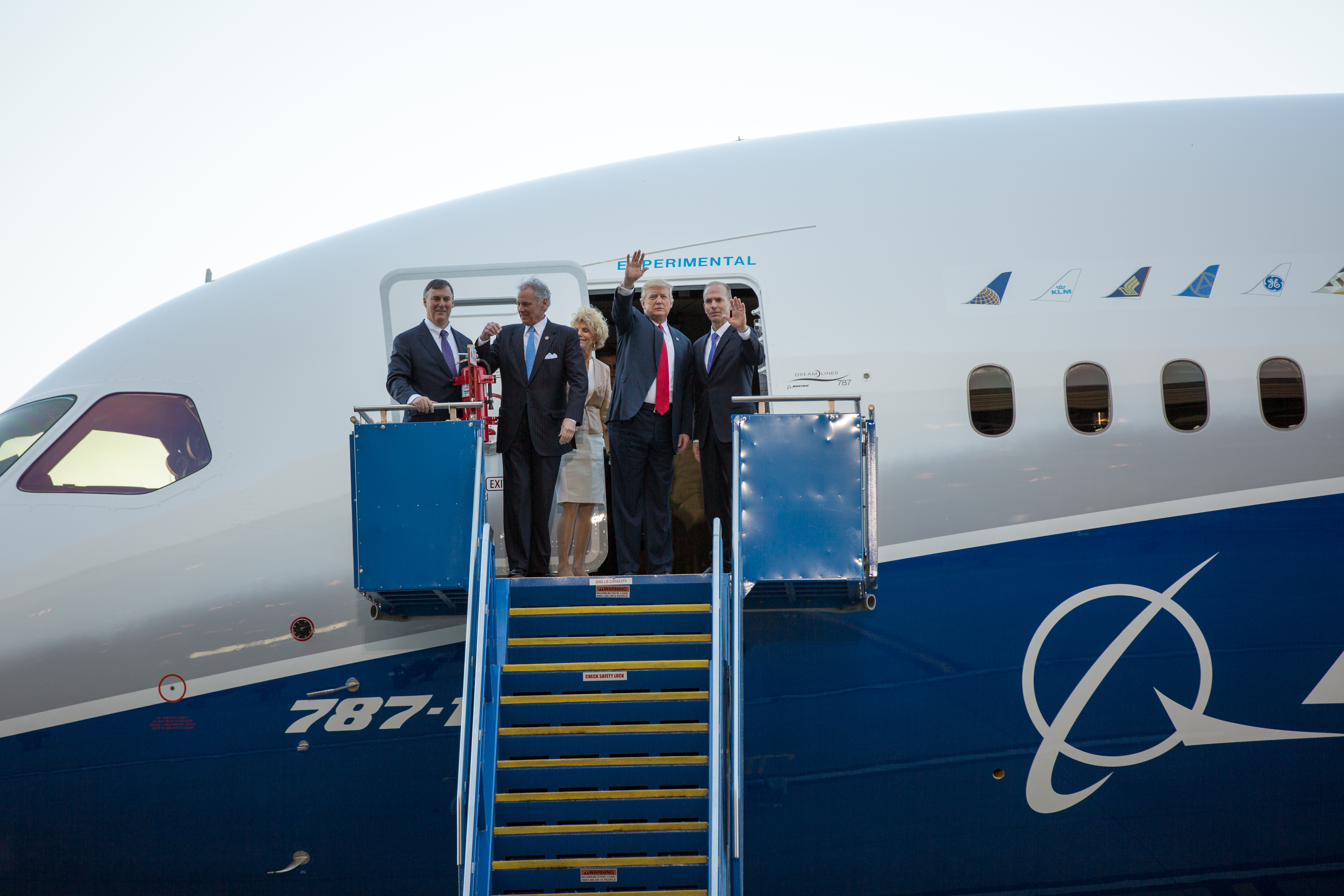
President Donald Trump and Henry McMaster rollout the first Boeing 787-10 at the factory in Charleston, South Carolina.

On November 23, 2016, President-elect Donald Trump announced his intention to nominate Haley as Ambassador to the United Nations. On January 24, 2017, the Senate confirmed Haley. Later that day, she resigned as governor and McMaster assumed the governorship. Inaugurated at the age of 69 years and 8 months, McMaster is the oldest person ever to assume the office of governor in South Carolina. During the 2024 Republican Party presidential primaries, Trump said he nominated Haley in order for McMaster to become governor. McMaster served the remainder of Haley's term, which expired in January 2019.

McMaster placed first in the June 2018 Republican gubernatorial primary with 155,072 votes. But since he received 42.3% of the vote, less than a majority, he faced John Warren in a runoff. On June 26, McMaster won the runoff with over 53% of the vote. He chose businesswoman Pamela Evette as his running mate over incumbent lieutenant governor Kevin L. Bryant, who ran against McMaster for the gubernatorial nomination. Trump endorsed McMaster. McMaster defeated Democratic nominee James Smith in the general election with 54% of the vote.

McMaster ran for reelection in 2022 and secured the Republican nomination in the June 14 primary. He defeated the Democratic nominee, Joe Cunningham, in the general election.

==== Recognition ====
McMaster ranked fifth on the Post and Courier Columbia's 2025 Power List.

=== Endorsements ===
McMaster endorsed Lindsey Graham in the 2026 United States Senate race, and served in a leadership capacity on Graham's campaign team until Graham died on July 11.

=== Policies ===
==== Abortion ====
McMaster opposes abortion. On February 18, 2021, he signed a bill into law that would ban most abortions. The next day, a federal judge suspended the law until June 2022. After the U.S. Supreme Court overturned Roe v. Wade, McMaster said he "looks forward to the day we don't have abortions," and that he would sign any anti-abortion bill that came across his desk.

In 2023, McMaster signed the Heartbeat bill into law, prohibiting abortion after a heartbeat is detected (usually six weeks into pregnancy). The next day, courts blocked the law; McMaster and Republican lawmakers appealed to the South Carolina Supreme Court. On August 23, 2023, the state supreme court overrode the block, restoring the stricter prohibition.

==== Fiscal policies ====
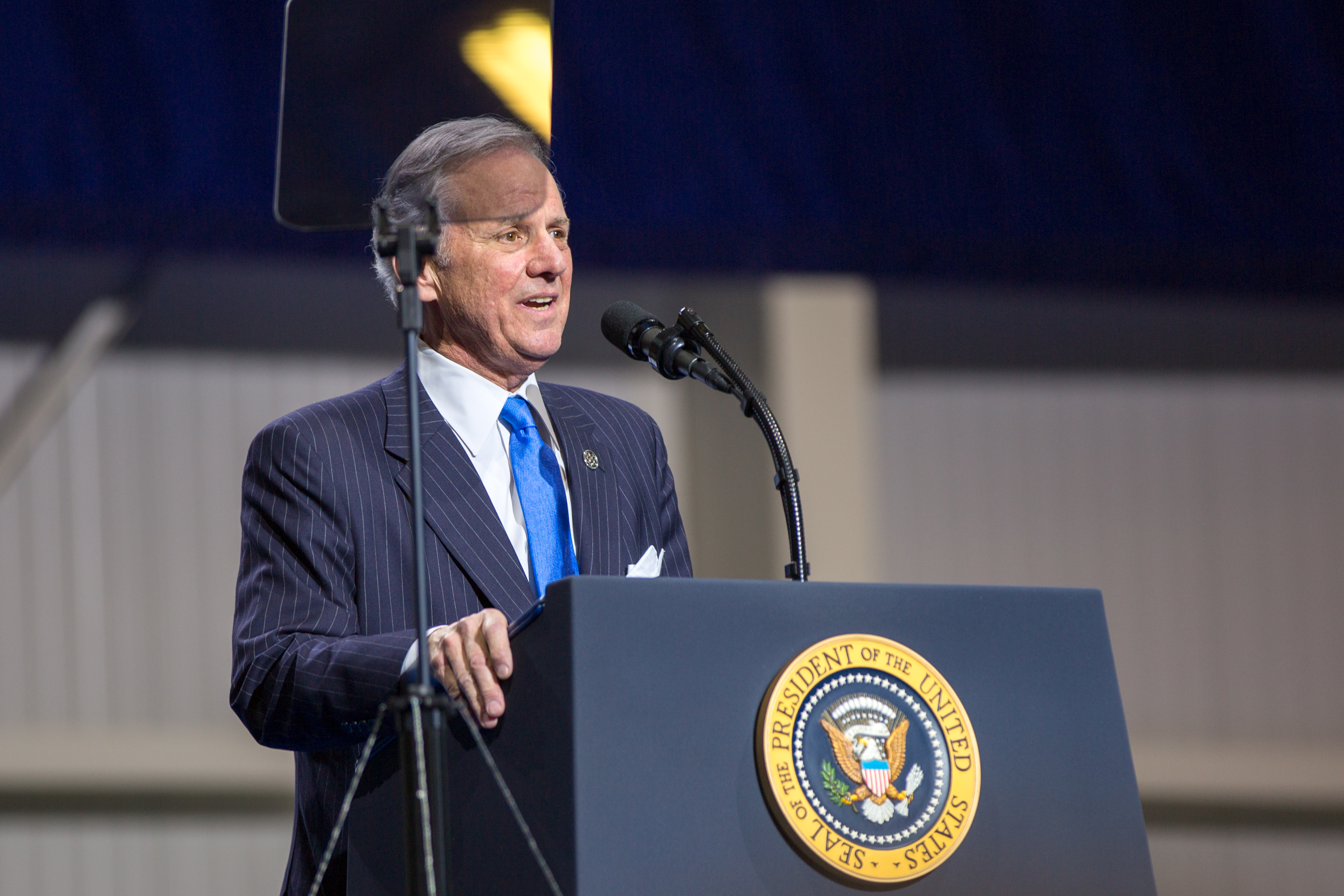
McMaster speaking in February 2017

On February 6, 2017, McMaster's first major action as governor was to request $5.18 billion from President Trump for South Carolina's infrastructure. Trump made no public statement about McMaster's request. Later in February, McMaster announced, "[the] state government is going to have to go on a diet as far as spending." On May 9, 2017, he vetoed a bill that would have raised the state's gas tax by 12 cents—the largest tax increase in state history—but the South Carolina General Assembly overrode his veto the following day. McMaster said the state had "plenty of money in the system to do all the work on the roads if we would just apply it to the roads that need the work... It's not necessary to put yet another tax on the people of South Carolina." In 2025, McMaster proposed allocating $1.1 billion to state construction projects, one of the largest single-year infrastructure investments in state history.

In 2023, McMaster appointed Democrat Brian J. Gaines as Comptroller General in a recess appointment.

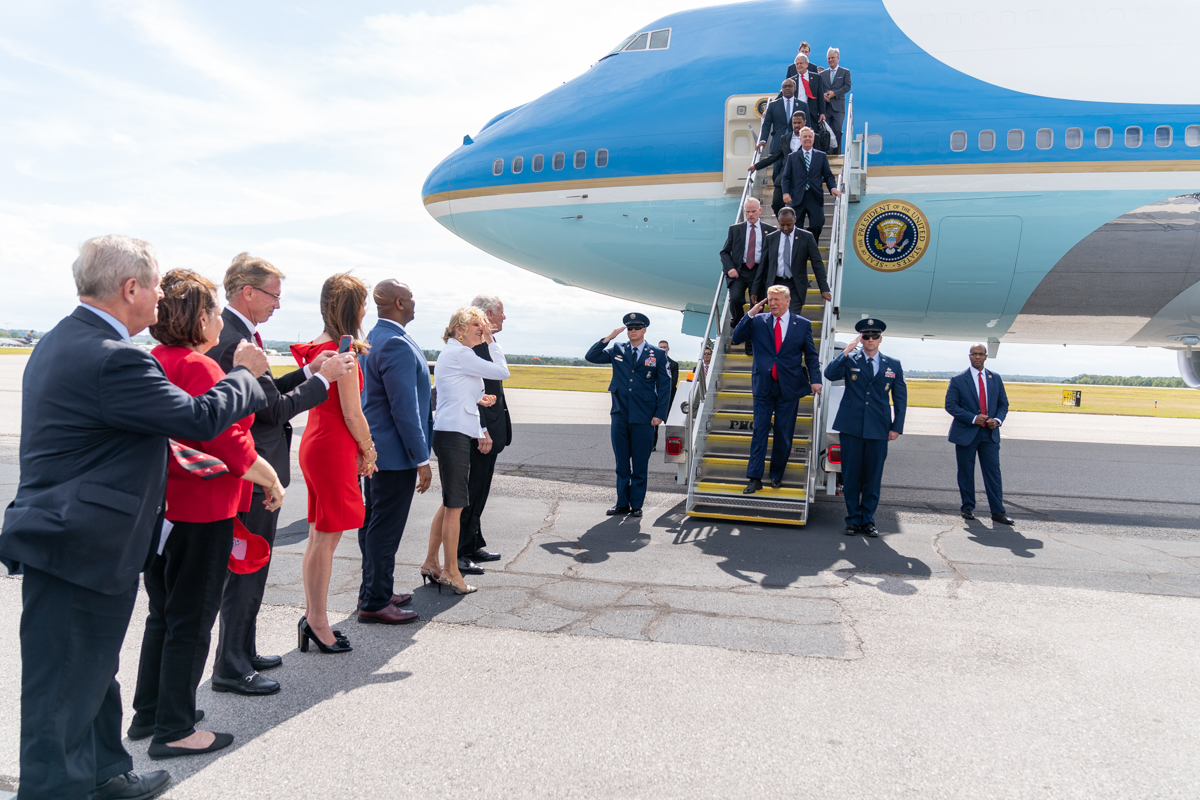
McMaster, a strong ally of Donald Trump, greets the president as he arrives in South Carolina

==== Firearms ====
McMaster is a strong supporter of the Second Amendment to the U.S. Constitution, the National Rifle Association, and legislation that gives citizens easy access to firearms. When students led a walkout to protest gun violence and call for stricter gun control a month after the Stoneman Douglas High School shooting, McMaster called the walkout "shameful" and said it was a "tricky move" orchestrated by "left-wing groups" that were using the students as "tools" to further their agenda. Student activist David Hogg, who survived the Parkland shooting, criticized McMaster, saying in a tweet that "future voters will not reelect you and outlive you too." In 2021, McMaster signed a bill that allows South Carolina's citizens to open carry a firearm with a concealed weapons permit, which required holders to pass a training course and background check. But that requirement was eliminated after McMaster signed legislation in 2024 that allows permit-less open carry. The law also reduced the minimum age for handgun ownership from 21 to 18 and increased penalties for unlawful uses of firearms.

==== Immigration ====
In 2018, McMaster offered to send troops from the South Carolina National Guard to assist Texas in combating illegal immigration and drug trafficking. This came after Trump called for the deployment of thousands of soldiers along the Mexico–United States border, in which border states such as Arizona and New Mexico also participated. In 2023, after a request for assistance by Texas governor Greg Abbott following the expiration of Title 42, McMaster authorized the deployment of South Carolina National Guard troops to Texas. He called the troop mobilization an attempt to "stop the drug cartels, criminals, and terrorists from entering our country to peddle their poison".

==== Labor unions ====
In 2024, McMaster joined five other Republican governors (Kay Ivey, Brian Kemp, Tate Reeves, Bill Lee, and Greg Abbott) in a statement opposing the United Auto Workers unionization campaign.

==== LGBTQ+ issues ====
In 1993, as chair of the South Carolina Republican Party, McMaster criticized a bill cosponsored by Senator Fritz Hollings, a Democrat, that would prohibit workplace discrimination based on sexual orientation. McMaster said, "I want to know why he sponsored the gay-rights bill that allows homosexuals to be recruited to teach in schools, among other things." In 2006, as attorney general, McMaster successfully led the fight to ban same-sex marriage in South Carolina. He also said that South Carolina should "secede" over Don't Ask, Don't Tell. In an October 2022 gubernatorial debate, McMaster said that if the U.S. Supreme Court overturned Obergefell v. Hodges, he would enforce South Carolina's preexisting legislation that banned same-sex marriage. In 2022, he signed a bill that requires student athletes from elementary school to college to play on the team that corresponds to the gender listed on their birth certificates.

==== COVID-19 pandemic ====
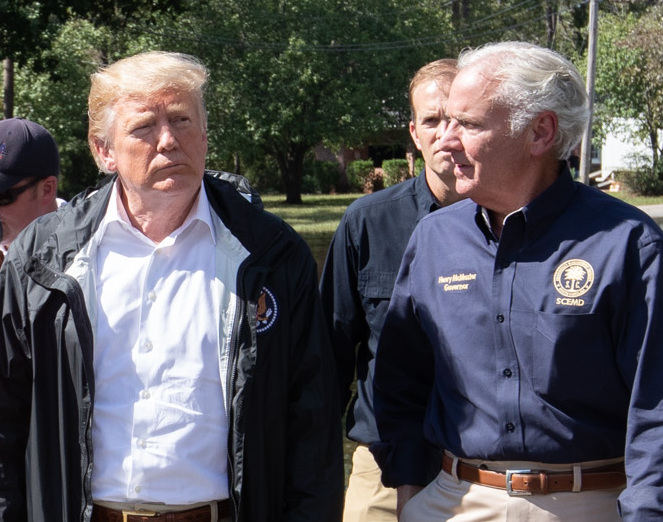
McMaster and President Donald Trump

Like most governors during the COVID-19 pandemic in the United States in 2020, McMaster declared a state of emergency. On April 20, 2020, McMaster drew criticism for reopening beaches and retail stores five days after South Carolina experienced its highest number of new positive COVID-19 tests, but he did include additional social distancing requirements in his executive order. McMaster said the economy was stalled because of the pandemic and that he anticipated having the economy "humming" by June 2020. By early June, McMaster reopened the majority of the state, though schools remained closed and businesses were required to follow social distancing procedures. Many schools and universities across the country canceled graduation ceremonies, but McMaster urged South Carolina schools to hold ceremonies in a manner that abided by social distancing requirements. He delivered the commencement address at West Florence High School's graduation ceremony and sang "Mull of Kintyre" while playing his guitar.

On June 10, state epidemiologist Linda Bell said that COVID-19 was worse in June than it was when the state was closed in March and April. On average, the number of cases in early June was five to six times higher than in March and April. McMaster said, "it is up to the people to determine what kind of precautions need to be followed," indicating that he would not place any more restrictions on businesses and public facilities. Bell accused McMaster of intentionally misleading the public about her stance on reopening the economy; she claimed that his staff was "somewhat manipulative" and made it appear that she and other scientists backed his plan to reopen the economy when she did not.

By late June and early July, confirmed cases in South Carolina had risen by as much as 2,000% compared to March and April. Despite pleas from lawmakers and other state officials, McMaster declined to enact a statewide requirement to wear masks, saying that such an order would be unenforceable. Consequently, dozens of municipalities enacted their own mask requirement ordinances, including Columbia, Forest Acres, Greenville, Charleston, Lexington, and most large cities and towns. Bell criticized McMaster's decision and said a statewide mask requirement would be more effective. McMaster responded that a statewide requirement would give a “false sense of security to South Carolinians." Attorney General Alan Wilson noted that ordinances and laws requiring masks are not illegal. On July 10, as the state's COVID-19 cases exceeded 50,000 and nearly 900 deaths, McMaster issued an executive order prohibiting businesses from selling alcohol after 11 p.m. in an effort to prevent the spread of the virus among younger people.

On July 15, McMaster said in an address that South Carolina schools should give parents the option to send students to in-person classes in September 2020. He instructed Superintendent of Education Molly Spearman to reject any school's reopening plan if it did not allow in-person learning. Groups such as the Palmetto State Teachers Association, the S.C. Education Association, and SC for Ed criticized McMaster's order, saying that it "would needlessly jeopardize the health and safety of our state's 800,000 students and more than 50,000 teachers." Several school districts, including Greenville County School District, the state's largest, denounced the order. Spearman, a Republican elected independently of McMaster, also disapproved of his order.

On July 29, McMaster signed an executive order requiring face masks for employees and patrons in all South Carolina restaurants and bars and prohibiting any restaurant from operating at more than 50% capacity, seating tables less than six feet apart, or allowing people to congregate at a bar. By October, McMaster lifted most restrictions and unveiled the SC Coronavirus Aid, Relief, and Economic Security (CARES) Act grants, a $65 million program aimed at helping small businesses and minority-owned businesses affected by COVID-19.

On December 22, the governor's office announced that McMaster and wife had both tested positive for COVID-19.

In 2021, McMaster said he would block the federal government from sending people door-to-door to promote vaccinations. In September 2021, he criticized federal vaccine requirements, saying, "Biden and the radical Democrats thumbed their noses at the Constitution." McMaster pledged to fight Biden "to the gates of hell" over the vaccine requirement. In 2025–2026, South Carolina was ground zero for the largest measles outbreak since 2000, the year in which measles were declared eliminated in the United States. The outbreak was attributed to low vaccination rates but McMaster did not support revising South Carolina's vaccination exemption policies.

==== George Floyd protests ====
In response to the murder of George Floyd in Minnesota, protests flared across the nation. In South Carolina, protests occurred in Columbia, Greenville, and Charleston. Greenville's protests were largely peaceful, but there were some instances of violence in Columbia and Charleston. In Columbia, police cars were destroyed, shots were fired at police, and businesses were vandalized. In Charleston, protesters stopped traffic on Interstate 26 and the Arthur Ravenel Jr. Bridge. Like President Trump, McMaster said that state and local governments were being too lenient on rioters and looters and was critical of Charleston's initial response. He said to Trump, "We've got to take people out, give them justice, make it more than just the cost of doing business to come into one town, get arrested, pay bond." McMaster mobilized the South Carolina National Guard to be dispatched, if necessary, to halt riots and looting. At Trump's request, he also sent members of the National Guard to Washington, D.C. to aid in larger-scale protests.

=== Allegations and investigations ===
==== Corruption investigation ====
In 2017, McMaster, the University of South Carolina, BlueCross BlueShield, Columbia Mayor Steve Benjamin, and a number of prominent state legislators were connected to Richard Quinn and Associates, a firm he employed for political consulting. Quinn was named as part of a larger corruption probe Special Prosecutor David Pascoe conducted within the South Carolina General Assembly, which first ensnared then-speaker Bobby Harrell, who resigned and pleaded guilty to public corruption charges in 2014. McMaster has not been implicated in Pascoe's corruption probe, but four state legislators have been indicted as part of it as of May 2017.

McMaster's connections to Richard Quinn and Associates caused him difficulty in the South Carolina legislature when he attempted to replace two members of the South Carolina Ports Authority (SCPA) Board of Directors whose terms had expired. At the time of McMaster's replacement nominations, the SCPA paid Quinn a consulting fee of $8,100 per month. State lawmakers delayed the vote on McMaster's two nominees for two weeks, citing the ongoing corruption probe that had pulled in three Republican legislators. Both nominees were confirmed after the SCPA voted to cease employing Quinn. McMaster likewise ceased to use Quinn in advance of his 2018 gubernatorial campaign.

==== Nukegate ====
McMaster was in office when it was announced that SCANA and Santee Cooper were abandoning the expansion of the Virgil C. Summer Nuclear Generating Station in 2017. The event has been nicknamed the Nukegate scandal. Following the retirement of Santee Cooper's chairman, McMaster appointed Charlie Condon as a replacement. McMaster favors the sale of the utility, which he has called a "rogue agency" due to its independence and financial problems.

==== Adams v. Henry McMaster ====
McMaster is a longtime advocate of private education. In 2020, as part of the Governor's Emergency Education Relief (GEER) and the CARES Act, federal funds were distributed to support education in states amid the COVID-19 pandemic. McMaster announced that he sought to use $32 million, or two thirds, of South Carolina's $48 million allotment on private school vouchers, and that 5,000 grants to private schools would be made with the federal relief money. His decision received harsh criticism from educators and politicians around the state. The Palmetto State Teachers Association stated that the money could have been better used for South Carolina's nearly 1,000,000 students in public education instead of 5,000 students in private schools. SC for Ed, a teachers' advocacy group, called the decision "disappointing."

McMaster's supporters argued that parents should have a choice about where to send their children. On July 22, 2020, McMaster's decision was halted by court order after educators sued him for failing to uphold a principle of the South Carolina Constitution: "No money shall be paid from public funds nor shall the credit of the State or any of its political subdivisions be used for the direct benefit of any religious or other private educational institution." McMaster's attorneys argued that the decision to use emergency funds for private schools should be decided by the voters or the South Carolina General Assembly, not a court order. On October 7, in the case Adams v. Henry McMaster, the South Carolina Supreme Court unanimously struck down McMaster's decision, citing a violation of the state constitution. On October 23, McMaster filed a petition to the court to review the ruling.

==== Comments about Democrats ====
In May 2023, McMaster angered Democrats after saying at a convention at River Bluff High School: "I look forward to the day that Democrats are so rare, we have to hunt them with dogs." Democrats demanded an apology and compared the comments to slave catchers who would use dogs to hunt escaped slaves. A spokesperson for McMaster said that he "has been making this joke at GOP conventions for years, and everyday South Carolinians understand that it's a joke."

==== Kidnapping plot allegations ====
On October 8, 2020, a federal indictment against six men associated with the Wolverine Watchmen, a Michigan-based militia group, was unsealed. The indictment charges the men with plotting to kidnap Michigan governor Gretchen Whitmer and violently overthrow Michigan's government. A search warrant unsealed on October 28 revealed that the suspects had also discussed targeting McMaster during the early stages of their planning. One of the suspects was arrested in Columbia at the time the plot was uncovered, but there was no indication that he had plans of going after McMaster.

==== Conservation and preservation ====
McMaster has been an advocate of preserving the Gullah culture, an African American ethnic group who predominantly live in South Carolina's Lowcountry region. In 2022, he declared the first week in August to be Gullah/Geechee appreciation week, and awarded the Order of the Palmetto award to Queen Quet, the chieftess of the Gullah/Geeche nation. McMaster has also called for the preservation of South Carolina's environmental landscapes from "over-development, mismanagement, flooding, erosion or from storm damage." He argued that such conservation would preserve South Carolina's culture and the economic revenue generated from such landscapes.

=== Veto record ===
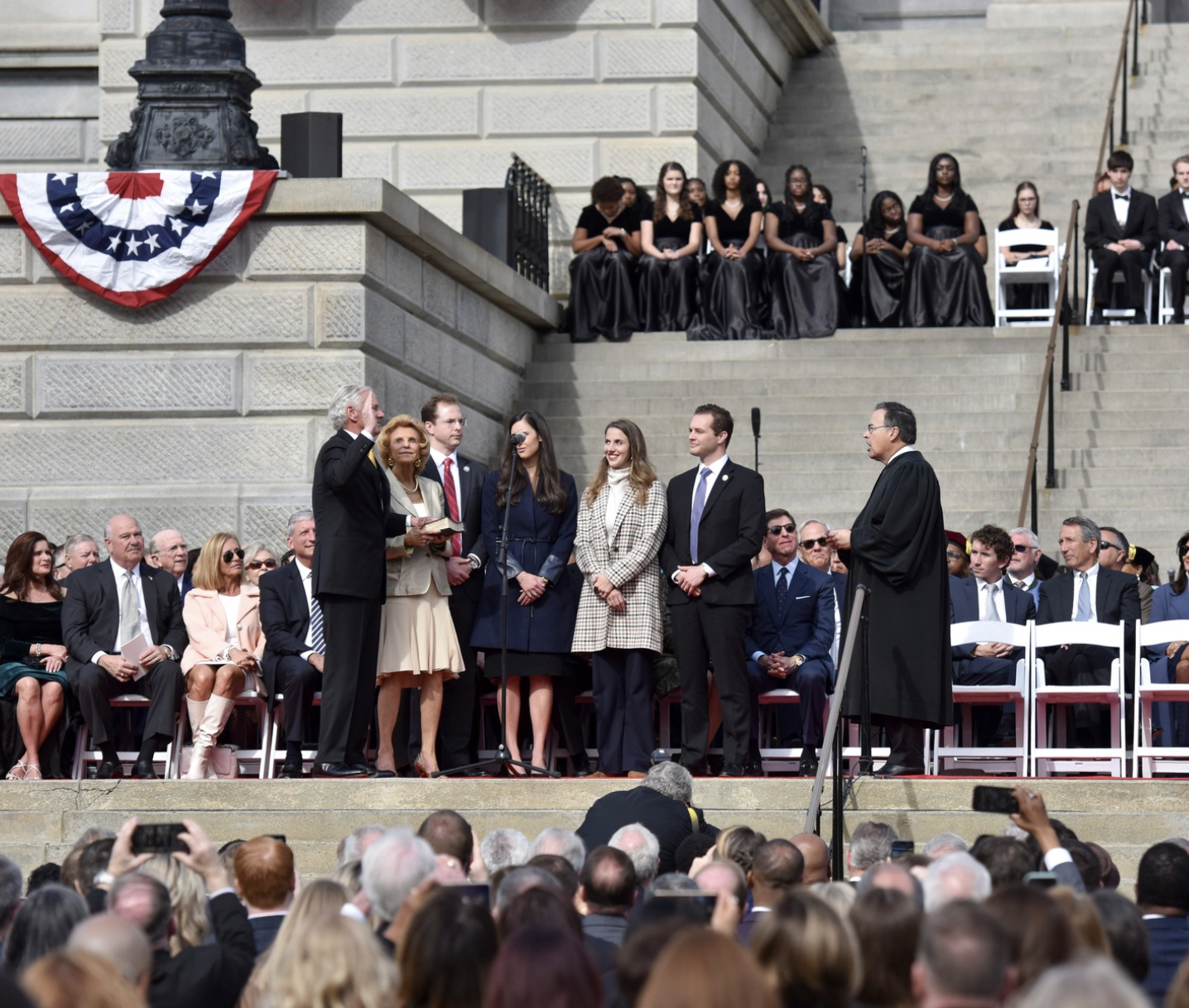
McMaster sworn in to his second full term, January 11, 2023.

As of February 9, 2026, McMaster had signed nearly 1,000 bills, vetoed 36, and had 24 vetoes overridden.

Legislative record
Legislative Action	Total
Bills Signed	979
Bills Vetoed	36
Line-item veto	7
Vetoes Sustained by Legislature	10
Vetoes Overridden by Legislature	24

== Personal life ==
=== Family ===
McMaster has been married to Peggy McMaster (née McAbee) since March 18, 1978. They have two adult children and reside in Columbia, South Carolina. He owns an English Bulldog named Mac. McMaster and his family attend First Presbyterian Church in Columbia.

=== Properties ===
McMaster and his wife own several houses and rental apartments in the Columbia area. One home they own is the McCord House, which was constructed in 1849 and used as a Union headquarters during the Civil War. McMaster typically leases or rents these homes to University of South Carolina students; they are his largest source of income. According to the Post and Courier, tenants have complained that the properties are unsafe and unsanitary. Images of roaches, outdated utilities, mold, bedbugs, mice, and bats validated the claim. Tenants have also complained about mold and having to wait months for pest control. When asked about the issues, McMaster denied the homes were unfit for renting. A spokeswoman for his campaign said, "Of course they are livable. No one would rent them if they were not." In 2016, McMaster's tax return showed that he received $7.7 million in rent on such houses and apartments between 2006 and 2015; he paid a little over $500,000 for upkeep, maintenance, and cleaning. McMaster has also reportedly paid over $16,000 in fines for ordinance violations. He has suggested that the fines were accrued because tenants trashed the properties.

== Electoral history ==
McMaster ran unsuccessfully for the U.S. Senate in 1986, for lieutenant governor in 1990, and for governor in 2010. He was elected attorney general in 2002 and 2006, lieutenant governor in 2014, and governor in 2018 and 2022.

== Notes ==
Party political offices
Preceded by Marshall Mays	Republican nominee for U.S. Senator from South Carolina (Class 3); 1986	Succeeded by Thomas F. Hartnett
Preceded by Thomas F. Hartnett	Republican nominee for Lieutenant Governor of South Carolina; 1990	Succeeded by Bob Peeler
Preceded by Barry Wynn	Chair of the South Carolina Republican Party; 1993–2002	Succeeded by Katon Dawson
Preceded by Charlie Condon	Republican nominee for Attorney General of South Carolina; 2002, 2006	Succeeded by Alan Wilson
Preceded by Ken Ard	Republican nominee for Lieutenant Governor of South Carolina; 2014	Succeeded by Pamela Evette
Preceded by Nikki Haley	Republican nominee for Governor of South Carolina; 2018, 2022	Succeeded by Alan Wilson
Legal offices
Preceded by Charlie Condon	Attorney General of South Carolina; 2003–2011	Succeeded by Alan Wilson
Political offices
Preceded by Yancey McGill	Lieutenant Governor of South Carolina; 2015–2017	Succeeded by Kevin L. Bryant
Preceded by Nikki Haley	Governor of South Carolina; 2017–present	Incumbent
U.S. order of precedence (ceremonial)
Preceded by JD Vance as Vice President	Order of precedence of the United States; Within South Carolina	Succeeded by Mayor of city in which event is held
Preceded by JD Vance as Vice President	Order of precedence of the United States; Within South Carolina	Succeeded by Otherwise Mike Johnson as Speaker of the House
Preceded by Wes Moore as Governor of Maryland	Order of precedence of the United States; Outside South Carolina	Succeeded by Kelly Ayotte as Governor of New Hampshire
