= 1986 United States Senate election in South Carolina =

- November 4, 1986
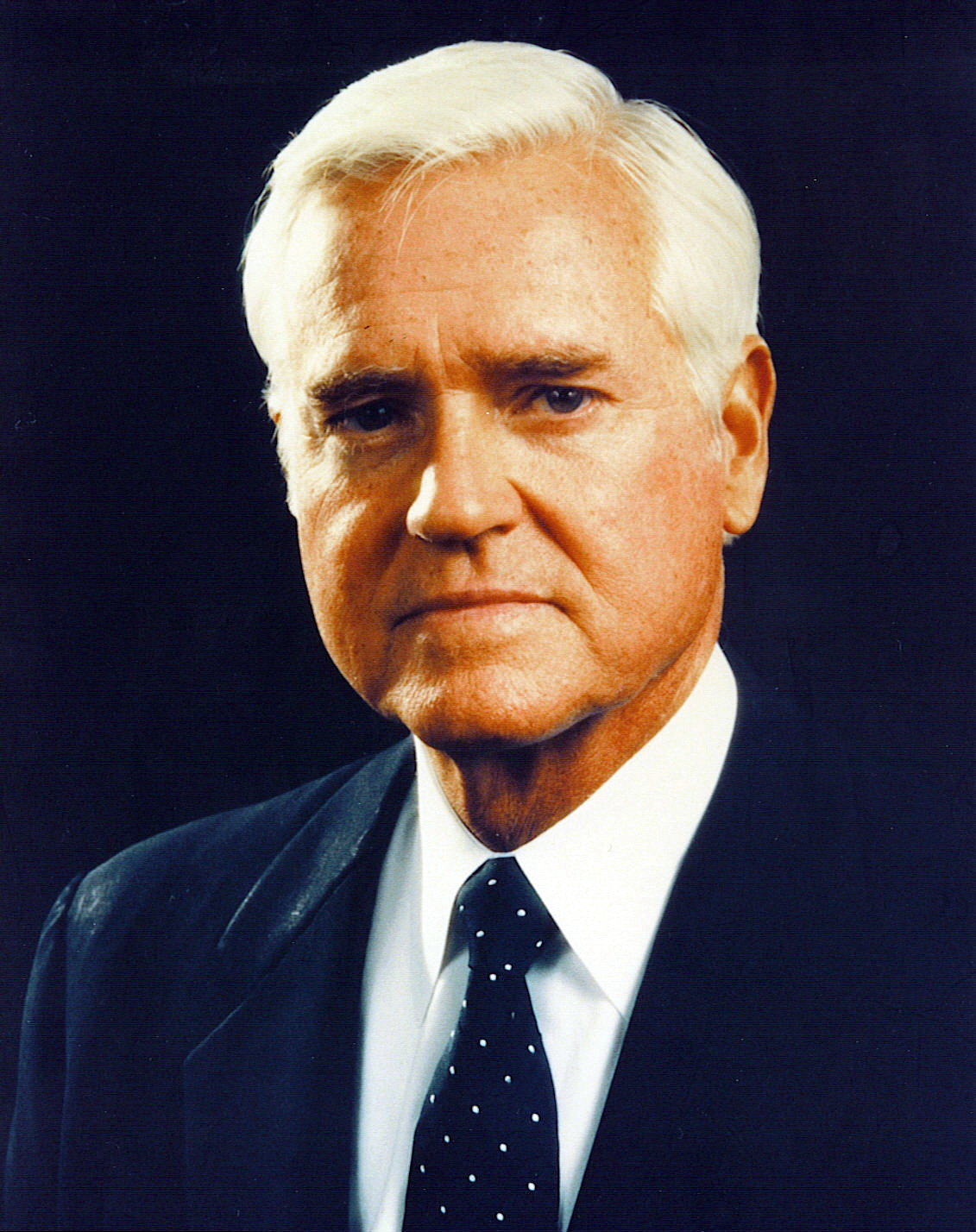

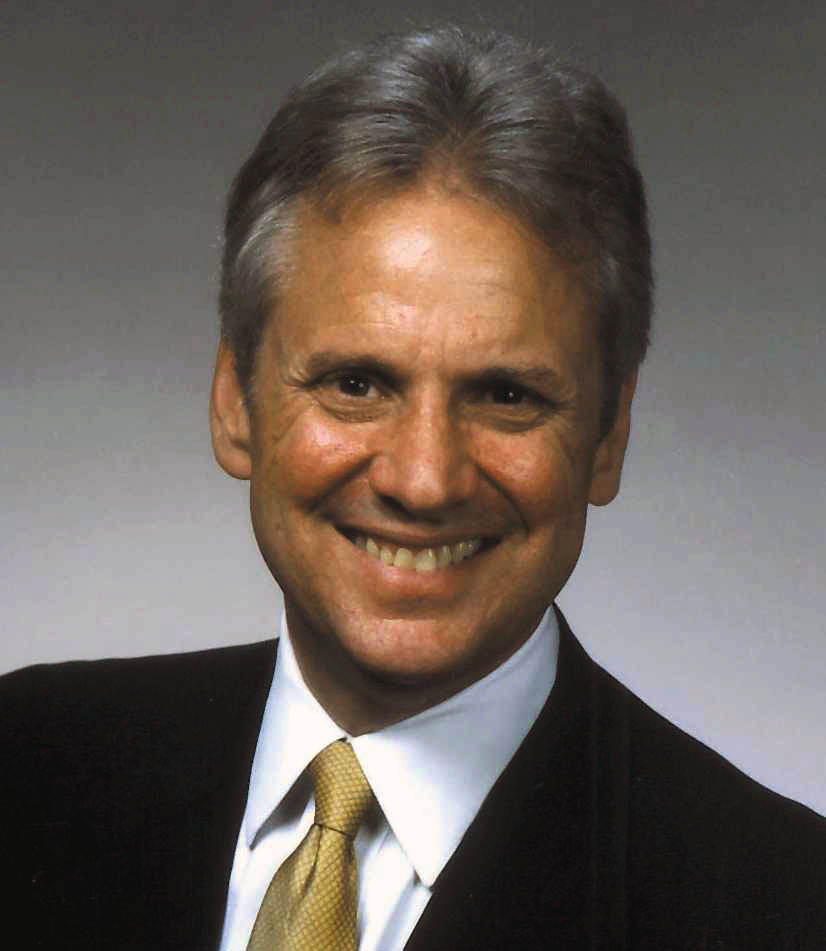
Nominee	Ernest Hollings	Henry McMaster
Party	Democratic	Republican
Popular vote	463,354	261,394
Percentage	63.07%	35.63%
- County results Hollings: 50–60% 60–70% 70–80% 80–90% McMaster: 50–60%
U.S. senator before election
Ernest Hollings
Democratic
Elected U.S. Senator
Ernest Hollings
Democratic

The 1986 South Carolina United States Senate election was held on November 4, 1986 to select the U.S. Senator from the state of South Carolina. Popular incumbent Democratic Senator Fritz Hollings easily defeated Republican challenger Henry McMaster to win his fifth (his fourth full) term. This is the last U.S. Senate election in South Carolina where Democrats won with a double-digit margin. McMaster later served as South Carolina’s lieutenant governor from 2011 to 2017 and has been the state’s governor following the resignation of Nikki Haley in 2017. McMaster also served South Carolina as its State Attorney General from 2003 to 2011.

== Republican primary ==
The Republican primary campaign pitted U.S. Attorney Henry McMaster against Henry Jordan, a social conservative supported by televangelist Pat Robertson and many Christian activists.

=== Candidates ===
- Henry Jordan, surgeon
- Henry McMaster, U.S. Attorney

=== Results ===
McMaster: 50–60%; 60–70%; 70–80%; 80–90%; >90%; Jordan: 50–60%; 60–70%; 80–90%; >90%; Tie: 50%

Republican Primary
Candidate	Votes	%
Henry McMaster	27,695	53.4%
Henry Jordan	24,164	46.6%

== General election ==
=== Endorsements ===
Ernest Hollings (D)

Newspapers

- Anderson Independent-Mail
- The Columbia Record
- The State
- The Sun News

=== Candidates ===
- Ray Hillyard (A)
- Fritz Hollings (D), incumbent U.S. Senator
- Henry McMaster (R), U.S. Attorney
- Steven Vandervelde (L)

=== Campaign ===
The race was not seriously contested and was not a target by the Republicans. With little financial assistance, McMaster was unable to mount a credible challenge to Hollings' re-election in what became a difficult year for Republicans.

=== Results ===
South Carolina U.S. Senate Election, 1986
Party	Candidate	Votes	%	±%
Democratic	Fritz Hollings (incumbent)	465,511	63.07%	−7.29%
Republican	Henry McMaster	262,976	35.63%	+6.00%
Libertarian	Steven B. Vandervelde	4,788	0.65%	N/A
American	Ray Hillyard	4,588	0.62%	N/A
No party	Write-Ins	199	0.03%	N/A
Majority		202,535	27.44%	−13.29%
Turnout		738,062	56.6%	−13.9%
Democratic hold				

== See also ==
- List of United States senators from South Carolina
- 1986 United States Senate elections
- 1986 South Carolina gubernatorial election
