= 2014 South Carolina elections =

- November 4, 2014

A general election was held in the U.S. state of South Carolina on November 4, 2014. All of South Carolina's executive officers were up for election, all of the seats in the General Assembly's House of Representatives, both United States Senate seats, and all of South Carolina's seven seats in the United States House of Representatives.

Primary elections were held on June 10, 2014, and primary runoffs were held on June 24.

== State House of Representatives ==
All 124 seats in the state House were up for election. Both major parties maintained their seat share, with the Republicans holding 78 seats and the Democrats holding 46.

== Governor ==
Incumbent Republican Governor Nikki Haley ran for re-election to a second term.

Democratic state senator Vincent Sheheen, the nominee in 2010 ran again.

Republican-turned-Independent Tom Ervin, an attorney, former state representative and former circuit court judge ran, but withdrew in the final week and endorsed Sheheen. Other candidates included Libertarian businessman Steve French; and former NFL player Morgan Bruce Reeves of the United Citizens Party. and Charels Green (better known as Angry Grandpa) a semi famous YouTuber

Haley won re-election.

== Lieutenant governor ==
2014 South Carolina lieutenant gubernatorial election
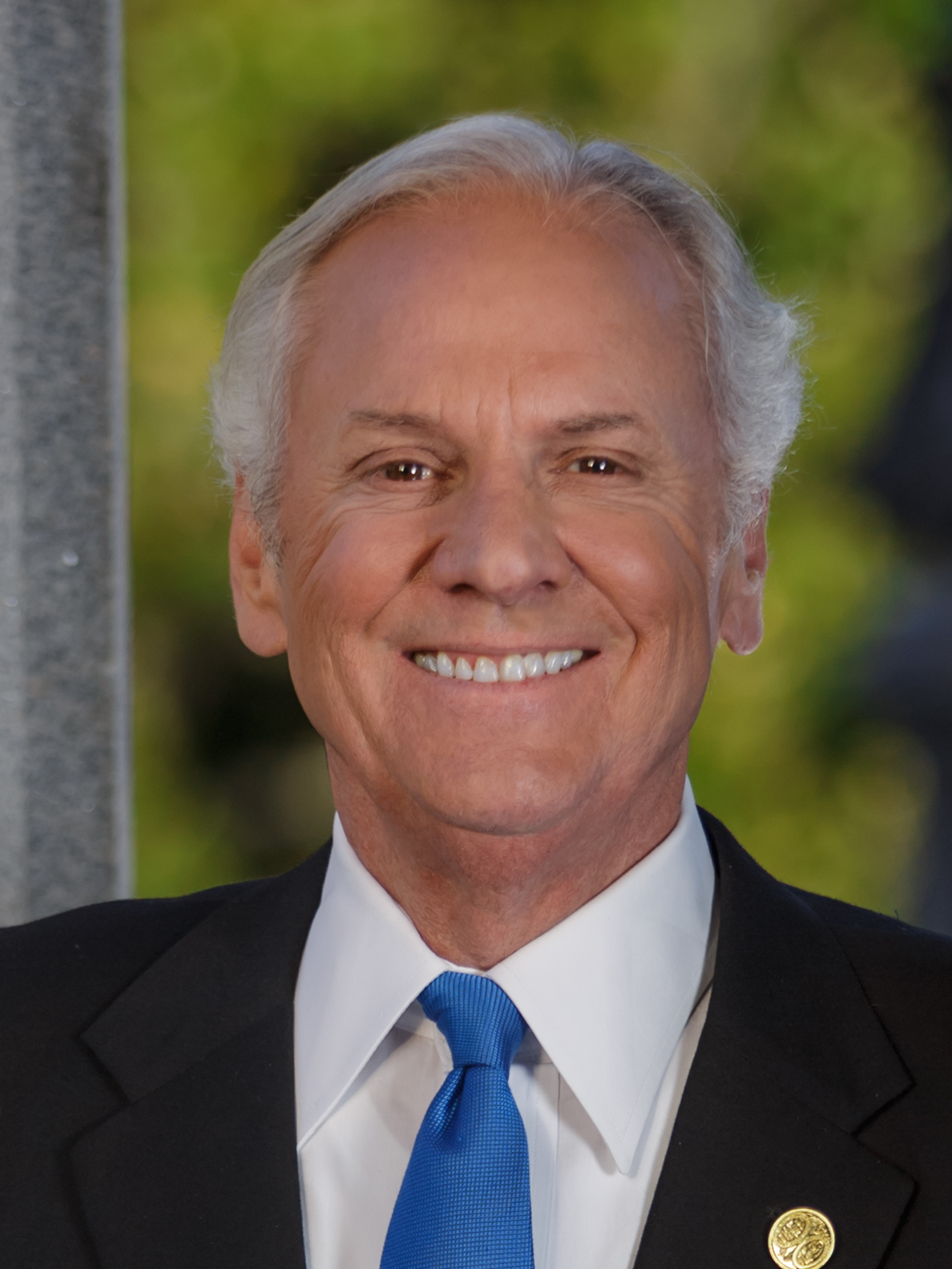

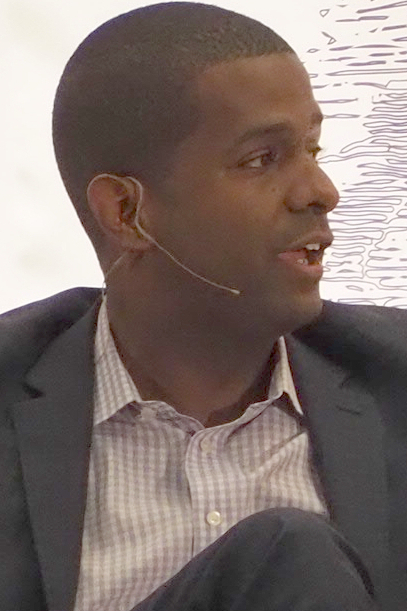
Nominee	Henry McMaster	Bakari Sellers
Party	Republican	Democratic
Popular vote	726,821	508,807
Percentage	58.7%	41.1%
- County results McMaster: 50–60% 60–70% 70–80% Sellers: 50–60% 60–70% 70–80%
Lieutenant Governor before election
Yancey McGill
Democratic
Elected Lieutenant Governor
Henry McMaster
Republican

This was the last election in which the lieutenant governor was elected separately from the governor. Republican Ken Ard, who was elected in 2010, resigned the office in March 2012 while under investigation for ethics charges. He was succeeded by a fellow Republican, President pro tempore of the South Carolina Senate Glenn F. McConnell. McConnell had planned to run, but withdrew from the race in January 2014 and was announced as the next president of the College of Charleston in March, a position he took up in June.

The state constitution requires that the Senate President pro tempore become lieutenant governor in the event of a vacancy but McConnell's successor as president pro tempore, Republican state senator John E. Courson, expressed no desire to give up his Senate seat to serve as lieutenant governor for six months. He went as far as resigning as president pro tempore, to avoid becoming lieutenant governor, a position widely regarded as one of the weakest in the state. There was much confusion as to what would happen next, with McConnell saying he would delay his resignation so as not to leave the state "in a constitutional crisis" and Courson and Senate Judiciary Committee Chairman Larry A. Martin saying that they knew of no Senator who would want to become lieutenant governor for six months. The dispute was finally ended when Democrat Yancey McGill agreed to become Senate President pro tempore, and then lieutenant governor. After he ascended to that office, Republican Hugh K. Leatherman Sr. became the new Senate President pro tempore.

Businessman Mike Campbell, who lost the runoff for lieutenant governor in 2010, businessman Pat McKinney, former attorney general of South Carolina and candidate for governor in 2010 Henry McMaster and minister Ray Moore ran for the Republican nomination.

South Carolina Lieutenant Governor Republican Primary Results, 2014
Party	Candidate	Votes	%
Republican	Henry McMaster	131,546	43.63
Republican	Pat McKinney	73,451	24.36
Republican	Mike Campbell	72,204	23.95
Republican	Ray Moore	24,335	8.07
Total votes		301,536	100

As no candidate won a majority of the vote, a runoff was held. A recount had been scheduled to take place as the difference between second-placed Pat McKinney and third-placed Mike Campbell was only 0.41%, but McKinney withdrew from the race, citing personal reasons. Campbell thus faced first-placed Henry McMaster in the runoff.

South Carolina Lieutenant Governor Republican Primary Runoff results, 2014
Party	Candidate	Votes	%
Republican	Henry McMaster	85,301	63.58
Republican	Mike Campbell	48,863	36.42
Total votes		134,164	100

State Representative Bakari Sellers ran for the Democrats. McMaster won the general election.

South Carolina Lieutenant Governor election, 2014
Party	Candidate	Votes	%	±%
Republican	Henry McMaster	726,821	58.75%	+3.59%
Democratic	Bakari Sellers	508,807	41.13%	−3.64%
Write-ins		1,514	0.12%	+0.04%
Majority		218,014	17.62%	+7.53%
Turnout		1,237,142	42.94%	−7.54%
Republican gain from Democratic		Swing		

== Attorney General ==
Incumbent Republican attorney general Alan Wilson ran for re-election to a second term in office.

2014 South Carolina Attorney General election
- November 4, 2014
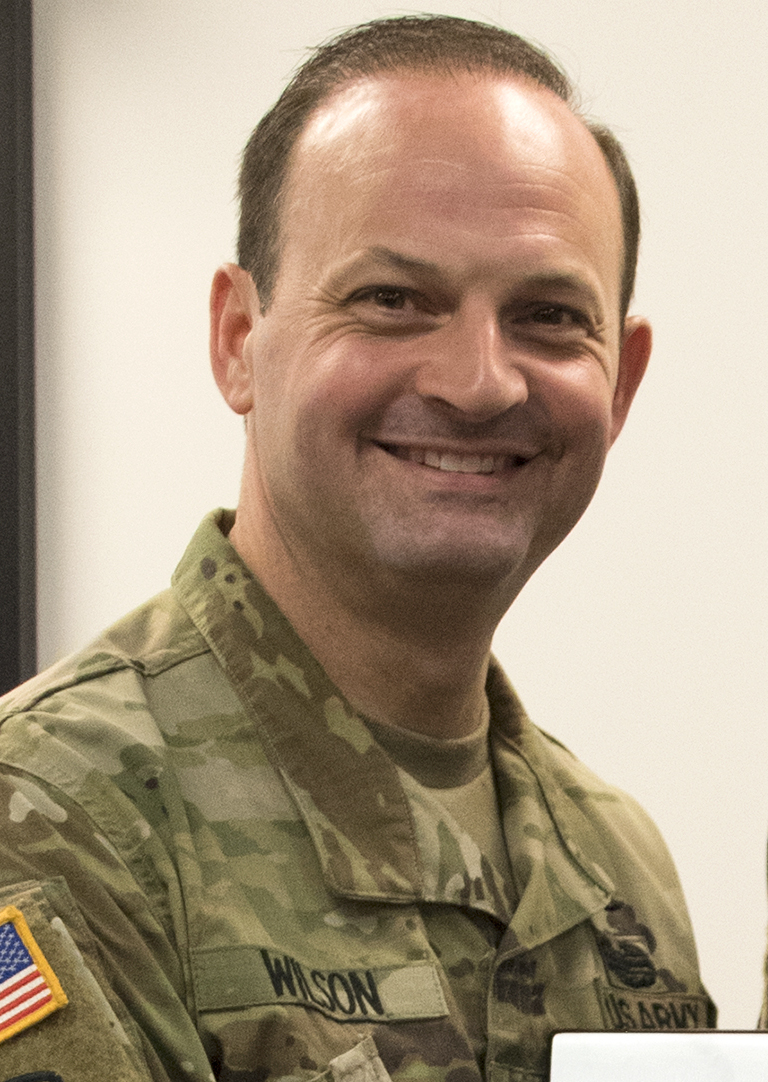

Candidate	Alan Wilson	Parnell Diggs
Party	Republican	Democratic
popular vote	738,434	486,058
Percentage	60.26%	39.67%
- County results Wilson: 50–60% 60–70% 70–80% 80–90% Diggs: 50–60% 60–70% 70–80%

Attorney, President of the National Federation of the Blind of South Carolina and candidate for South Carolina's 7th congressional district in 2012 Parnell Diggs ran as the Democratic nominee. Wilson defeated him and won re-election.

South Carolina Attorney General election, 2014
Party	Candidate	Votes	%	±%
Republican	Alan Wilson	738,434	60.26%	+6.52%
Democratic	Parnell Diggs	486,058	39.67%	−4.53%
Write-ins		879	0.07%	+0.03%
Majority		252,376	17.62%	+8.10%
Turnout		1,225,371	42.53%	−7.95%
Republican hold		Swing		

== Secretary of State ==
Incumbent Republican Secretary of State Mark Hammond ran for re-election to a fourth term in office.

2014 South Carolina Secretary of State election
- November 4, 2014
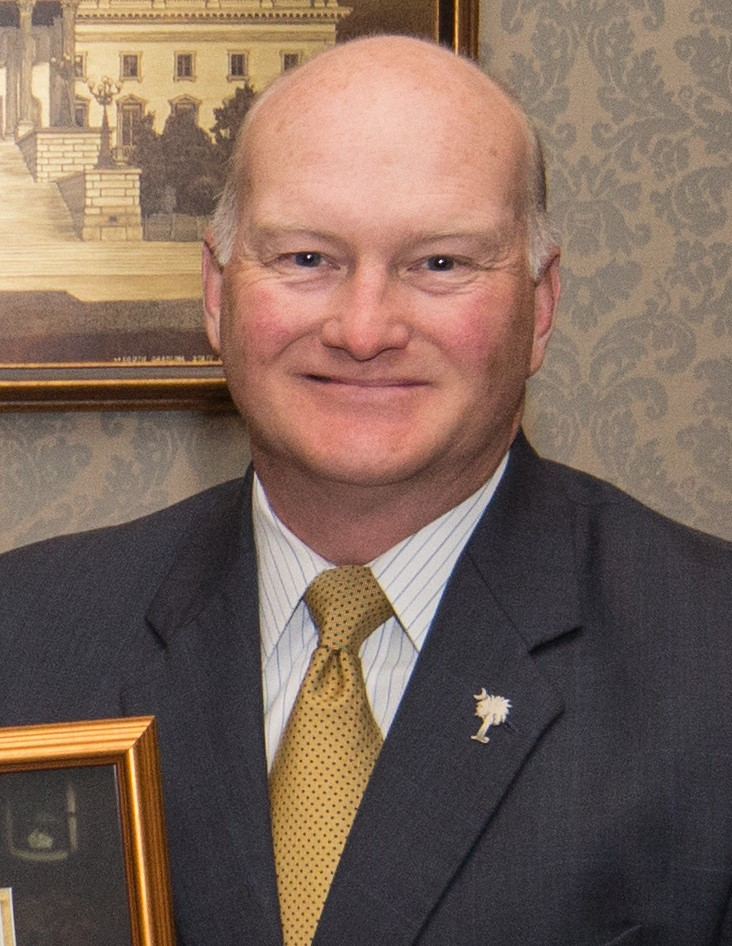

Candidate	Mark Hammond	Ginny Deerin
Party	Republican	Democratic
popular vote	730,739	496,344
Percentage	59.41%	40.42%
- County results Hammond: 50–60% 60–70% 70–80% Deerin: 50–60% 60–70% 70–80%

Nonprofit consultant Ginny Deerin ran as the Democratic nominee. She was endorsed by the Club for Growth, a conservative political organization that usually supports Republicans. She was the first ever Democrat running for statewide office to have been endorsed by them. However, Hammond still won re-election.

South Carolina Secretary of State election, 2014
Party	Candidate	Votes	%	±%
Republican	Mark Hammond	730,739	59.51%	−1.40%
Democratic	Ginny Deerin	496,344	40.42%	+1.38%
Write-ins		788	0.06%	−0.01%
Majority		234,395	19.09%	−2.78%
Turnout		1,227,871	42.62%	−7.48%
Republican hold		Swing		

== Treasurer ==
Incumbent Republican Treasurer Curtis M. Loftis Jr. ran for re-election to a second term in office.

2014 South Carolina Treasurer election
- November 4, 2014
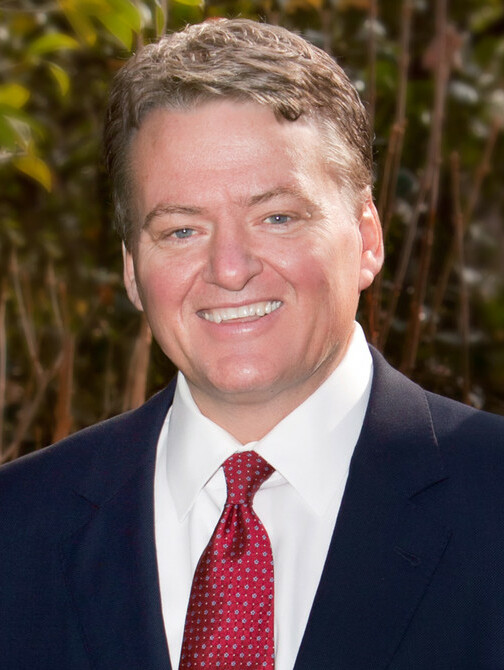

Candidate	Curtis Loftis
Party	Republican	Write-ins
popular vote	857,526	10,819
Percentage	98.75%	1.25%
- County results Loftis: 90-100%

Brian Adams ran against Loftis Jr. in the Republican primary.

South Carolina Treasurer Republican Primary results, 2014
Party	Candidate	Votes	%
Republican	Curtis M. Loftis Jr.	177,854	62.02
Republican	Brian Adams	108,934	37.98
Total votes		286,788	100

No Democrat filed to run for the office. Loftis won re-election.

South Carolina Treasurer election, 2014
Party	Candidate	Votes	%	±%
Republican	Curtis Loftis	857,526	98.75%	−0.19%
Write-ins		10,819	1.25%	+0.19%
Majority		846,707	97.50%	−0.38%
Turnout		868,345	30.14%	−4.61%
Republican hold		Swing		

== Comptroller General ==
Incumbent Republican Richard Eckstrom ran for re-election to a fourth term in office.

2014 South Carolina Comptroller General election
- November 4, 2014
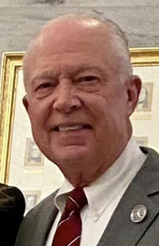

Candidate	Richard Eckstrom	Kyle Herbert
Party	Republican	Democratic
popular vote	728,549	489,066
Percentage	59.80%	40.14%
- County results Eckstrom: 50–60% 60–70% 70–80% Herbert: 50–60% 60–70% 70–80%

Eckstrom was challenged in the Republican primary by Robert D. Shelley, but Shelley withdrew.

Kyle Herbert was the Democratic nominee. Eckstrom won re-election.

South Carolina Comptroller General election, 2014
Party	Candidate	Votes	%	±%
Republican	Richard Eckstrom	728,549	59.80%	+3.30%
Democratic	Kyle Herbert	489,066	40.14%	−3.31%
Write-ins		693	0.06%	+0.01%
Majority		239,483	19.66%	+6.61%
Turnout		1,218,308	42.49%	−7.78%
Republican hold		Swing		

== Superintendent of Education ==
Incumbent Republican Superintendent of Education Mick Zais did not run for re-election to a second term in office.

2014 South Carolina Superintendent of Education election
- November 4, 2014
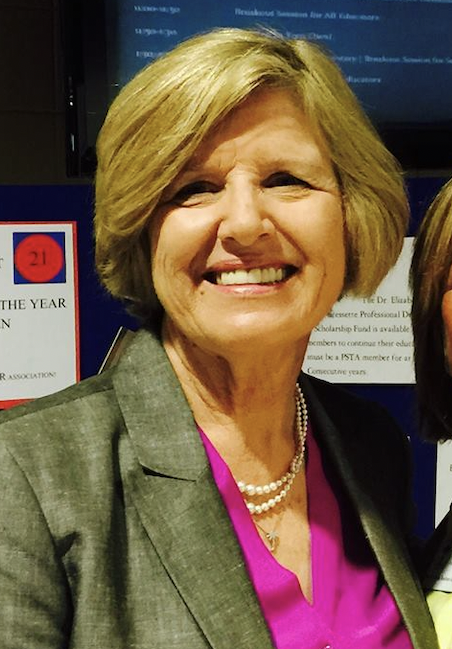

Candidate	Molly Spearman	Tom Thompson
Party	Republican	Democratic
popular vote	699,081	476,358
Percentage	56.97%	38.82%
- County results Spearman: 50–60% 60–70% 70–80% Thompson: 40–50% 50–60% 60–70% 70–80%

Lee Atwater's widow Sally Atwater, Anderson County School Board member Gary Burgess, South Carolina Department of Education official Meka Bosket Childs, Amy Cofield, candidate for the State House in 2010 Sheri Few, Don Jordan, Charleston County School Board member and candidate for South Carolina's 1st congressional district in 2013 Elizabeth Moffly and former state representative Molly Mitchell Spearman ran for the Republican nomination.

South Carolina Superintendent of Education Republican Primary results, 2014
Party	Candidate	Votes	%
Republican	Molly Mitchell Spearman	64,992	22.45
Republican	Sally Atwater	63,584	21.96
Republican	Sheri Few	56,044	19.36
Republican	Gary Burgess	31,091	10.74
Republican	Amy Cofield	20,720	7.16
Republican	Meka Bosket Childs	20,720	6.71
Republican	Elizabeth Moffly	17,421	6.02
Republican	Don Jordan	16,246	5.61
Total votes		289,534	100

As no candidate won a majority, a runoff was held between the top two finishers, Molly Mitchell Spearman and Sally Atwater. Atwater was considered to be the frontrunner, until she called conservative talk show host Russ Cassell on News Radio WORD to talk about her candidacy. In the "awkward", "evasive" and "awful, incomprehensible, it-should-force-her-to-drop-out-of-the-race" interview, she seemed unable to give answers to basic questions about sex education and the teaching of evolution, to Cassell's amazement. After Atwater hung up, Cassell concluded: "Folks, I don't want to be brutal, I don't want to be mean. What you have just heard is an example of a person running for public office on name recognition only, who is clueless." Atwater subsequently apologized for her performance and the interview, which was uploaded to YouTube, went viral. Atwater subsequently declined to debate Spearman before the runoff, with a spokesman for Spearman saying that "given [Atwater's] debate performance in the primary and her recent radio interview on WORD-FM, we can understand why she has made this political calculation. Atwater was also the subject of a lawsuit alleging that as a teacher she "routinely harassed, physically assaulted, and psychologically tormented" a disabled student. Atwater's campaign dismissed the lawsuit as "baseless and frivolous".

South Carolina Superintendent of Education Republican Primary Runoff results, 2014
Party	Candidate	Votes	%
Republican	Molly Mitchell Spearman	76,672	57.16
Republican	Sally Atwater	57,456	42.84
Total votes		134,164	100

=== Endorsements ===
Sally Atwater

Presidents of the United States

- George H. W. Bush, 41st President of The United States

U.S. Representatives

- Newt Gingrich (R-GA), former Speaker of the United States House of Representatives

South Carolina Department of Education official Montrio M. Belton Sr., Sheila C. Gallagher, State Representative Jerry Govan and Tom Thompson ran for the Democratic nomination.

South Carolina Superintendent of Education Democratic Primary results, 2014
Party	Candidate	Votes	%
Democratic	Sheila C. Gallagher	42,186	36.44
Democratic	Tom Thompson	30,488	26.34
Democratic	Jerry Govan	21,824	18.85
Democratic	Montrio M. Belton Sr.	21,260	18.37
Total votes		115,758	100

As no candidate won a majority, a runoff was held between the top two finishers, Sheila C. Gallagher and Tom Thompson.

South Carolina Superintendent of Education Democratic Primary Runoff results, 2014
Party	Candidate	Votes	%
Democratic	Tom Thompson	23,541	59.13
Democratic	Sheila C. Gallagher	16,269	40.87
Total votes		39,810	100

Ed Murray ran as the American Party nominee. Spearman won the general election.

South Carolina Superintendent of Education election, 2014
Party	Candidate	Votes	%	±%
Republican	Molly Spearman	699,081	56.97%	+5.71%
Democratic	Tom Thompson	476,358	38.82%	−4.29%
American Party	Ed Murray	46,695	3.81%	+3.81%
Write-ins		5,055	0.41%	+0.37%
Majority		222,723	18.15%	+10.00%
Turnout		1,227,189	42.60%	−7.71%
Republican hold		Swing		

== Commissioner of Agriculture ==
Incumbent Republican Commissioner of Agriculture Hugh Weathers, who was appointed to the position in September 2004, ran for re-election to a third full term in office.

Joe Farmer ran against Weathers in the Republican primary.

South Carolina Commissioner of Agriculture Republican Primary results, 2014
Party	Candidate	Votes	%
Republican	Hugh Weathers	184,621	65.06
Republican	Joe Farmer	99,155	34.94
Total votes		283,776	100

Emile DeFelice of the American Party and David Edmond of the United Citizens Party also ran. No Democrat filed to run for the office. Weathers won re-election.

Results by county Weathers: 50–60%; 60–70%; 70–80%; 80–90%

South Carolina Commissioner of Agriculture election, 2014
Party	Candidate	Votes	%	±%
Republican	Hugh Weathers	759,640	79.66%	+19.55%
United Citizens	Dave Edmond	106,223	11.14%	+11.14%
American Party	Emile DeFelice	84,831	8.90%	+8.90%
Write-ins		2,922	0.31%	+0.27%
Majority		653,417	68.52%	+48.46%
Turnout		953,616	33.10%	−16.82%
Republican hold		Swing		

== Adjutant General ==
Incumbent Republican Adjutant General Robert E. Livingston Jr. ran for re-election to a second term in office.

James Breazeale ran against Livingston Jr. in the Republican primary.

South Carolina Adjutant General Republican primary, 2014
Party	Candidate	Votes	%
Republican	Robert E. Livingston Jr.	209,484	75.75
Republican	James Breazeale	67,077	24.25
Total votes		276,561	100

No Democrat filed to run for the office. Livigston won re-election. Because South Carolina voters approved Amendment 2 in the 2014 general election, this was the last time that the adjutant general was popularly elected. Because South Carolina was the only state in the union to elect its adjutant general, this was the final time that a state adjutant general stood for election in the United States, barring future state constitutional changes.

Results by county Livingston: 90–100%

South Carolina Adjutant General election, 2014
Party	Candidate	Votes	%	±%
Republican	Bob Livingston	858,106	98.97%	−0.28%
Write-ins		8,896	1.03%	+0.28%
Majority		849,210	97.94%	−0.56%
Turnout		867,002	30.10%	−4.27%
Republican hold		Swing		

== United States Senate ==
Regularly scheduled election

Incumbent Republican senator Lindsey Graham is running for re-election to a third term in office. He faced six challengers in the Republican primary: pastor and businessman Det Bowers, State Senator Lee Bright, businessman and candidate for South Carolina's 3rd congressional district in 2010 Richard Cash, attorney, Lieutenant Colonel in the United States Army Reserve and candidate for lieutenant governor in 2010 Bill Connor, attorney Benjamin Dunn and businesswoman and author Nancy Mace. Graham won the primary with 56% of the vote, negating the need for a runoff.

State Senator Brad Hutto defeated entrepreneur Jay Stamper in the Democratic primary.

Former Republican state treasurer Thomas Ravenel is running as an independent. Libertarian Victor Kocher is also running.

Special election

Incumbent Republican senator Tim Scott, who was appointed to the office in January 2013 after Jim DeMint resigned, is running for election to the remaining part of the term. The seat will be up for election to a six-year term in 2016.

Scott defeated Randall Young in the Republican primary.

Richland County Councilwoman Joyce Dickerson defeated former York County Councilman Sidney Moore and attorney and candidate for South Carolina's 7th congressional district in 2012 Harry Pavilack for the Democratic nomination.

Independents Brandon Armstrong, a painting contractor, and Jill Bossi, former Vice President of the American Red Cross, are also running.

== United States House of Representatives ==
All of South Carolina's seven seats in the United States House of Representatives will be up for election in 2014.

== Advisory Questions and Referendums ==
Several advisory questions were placed on the primary election ballots to advise the major state parties on the positions of their membership on major policy questions. In the general election, voters also voted on two constitutional amendments. All passed with heavy majorities.

=== Primary Advisory Questions ===
Democratic Advisory Question One asked primary voters whether each state, rather than Congress, should determine whether to allow and how to regulate online gaming.

Democratic Question 1 Results by county Yes: 80–90%; 70–80%; 60–70%

Democratic Question 1
Choice	Votes	%
For	89,365	72.36
Against	34,131	27.64
Total	123,496	100.00
Registered voters/turnout	2,836,470	4.35
Source: – Official Results

Democratic Advisory Question Two asked whether gaming laws should be "modified" to fund transportation needs in the state, rather than tax increases.

Democratic Question 2 Results by county Yes: 80–90%; 70–80%

Democratic Question 2
Choice	Votes	%
For	99,667	80.50
Against	24,143	19.50
Total	123,810	100.00
Registered voters/turnout	2,836,470	4.36
Source: – Official Results

Democratic Advisory Question Three asked whether medical marijuana should be legalized for the treatment of "severe, chronic illnesses."

Democratic Question 3 Results by county Yes: 80–90%; 70–80%; 60–70%

Democratic Question 3
Choice	Votes	%
For	94,961	75.29
Against	31,172	24.71
Total	126,133	100.00
Registered voters/turnout	2,836,470	4.45
Source: – Official Results

Republican Question 1 asked whether the "privileges and immunities" of South Carolina citizens under the state constitution should be extended to unborn fetuses.

Republican Question 1 Results by county Yes: 80–90%; 70–80%; 60–70%; No Vote:

Republican Question 1
Choice	Votes	%
For	240,453	78.65
Against	65,273	21.35
Total	305,726	100.00
Registered voters/turnout	2,836,470	10.78
Source: – Official Results

Republican Question 2 asked whether the state income tax should be reduced by 1.4% a year until it no longer exists.

Republican Question 2 Results by county Yes: 80–90%; 70–80%; 60–70%; No Vote:

Republican Question 2
Choice	Votes	%
For	245,441	79.86
Against	61,908	20.14
Total	307,349	100.00
Registered voters/turnout	2,836,470	10.84
Source: – Official Results

=== Constitutional amendments ===
In the general election, voters voted on two amendments.

Amendment One amended the state's constitution to allow non-profit organizations to hold raffles for fundraising purposes. It passed.

Amendment 1 Results by county Yes: 80–90%; 70–80%

Amendment 1
Choice	Votes	%
For	989,991	82.72
Against	206,862	17.28
Total	1,196,853	100.00
Registered voters/turnout	2,881,052	41.54
Source: – Official Results

Amendment Two amended the state's constitution to make the adjutant general appointed by the governor, rather than popularly elected. It passed.

Amendment 2 Results by county Yes: 60–70%; 50–60%; No: 50–60%

Amendment 2
Choice	Votes	%
For	666,963	56.38
Against	515,970	43.62
Total	1,182,933	100.00
Registered voters/turnout	2,881,052	41.06
Source: – Official Results
