= Ralph Norman =

American politician (born 1953)

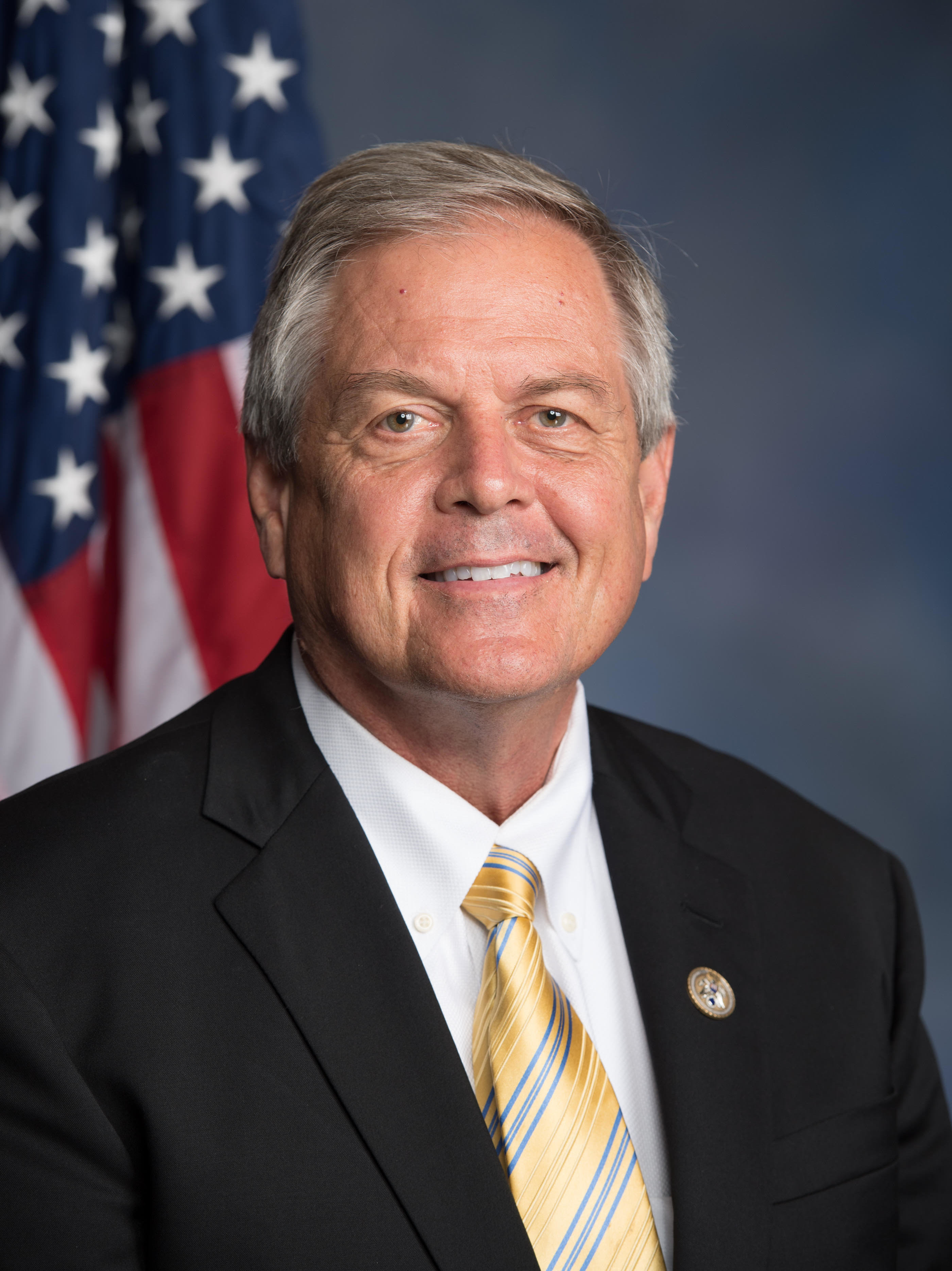
- Official portrait, 2017

Member of the U.S. House of Representatives from South Carolina's 5th district
- Incumbent
- Assumed office June 20, 2017 (Note: Norman's official service begins on the date of the special election, while he was not sworn in until June 26, 2017.)
- Preceded by: Mick Mulvaney
- Succeeded by: Wes Climer

Member of the South Carolina House of Representatives from the 48th district
- In office November 3, 2009 – February 16, 2017
- Preceded by: Carl Gullick
- Succeeded by: Bruce M. Bryant
- In office January 11, 2005 – January 9, 2007
- Preceded by: Becky Richardson
- Succeeded by: Carl Gullick

Personal details
- Born: Ralph Warren Norman Jr. June 20, 1953 (age 73) Rock Hill, South Carolina, U.S.
- Party: Republican
- Spouse: Elaine Rice (m. 1974)
- Children: 4
- Education: Presbyterian College (BS)
- Website: House website Campaign website
- Norman's voice Norman honoring Grover Fewox, a deceased World War II veteran. Recorded September 27, 2018.

Ralph Warren Norman Jr. (born June 20, 1953) is an American politician and real estate developer who has served as the U.S. representative for South Carolina's 5th congressional district since 2017. His district includes most of the South Carolina side of the Charlotte metropolitan area, along with outer portions of the Upstate and Midlands. Norman's tenure in Congress will end in January 2027 after unsuccessful gubernatorial and U.S. Senate bids.

A member of the Republican Party, Norman served as representative for the 48th district in the South Carolina House of Representatives from 2005 to 2007 and from 2009 to 2017.

Norman won a special election after Mick Mulvaney vacated his seat in Congress upon being appointed director of the Office of Management and Budget by President Donald Trump. As of November 2026, with a net worth of $63.73 million, Norman is the 25th wealthiest member of Congress. Heritage Action rated Norman as a 100% conservative member of the 119th Congress as of November 2026, with a lifetime rating of 98% conservative.

He advocated for the implementation of martial law to prevent the peaceful transfer of power to President-elect Joe Biden in January 2021.

== Early life and education ==
Norman was born in Rock Hill, South Carolina on June 20, 1953, to Warren and Mary Norman. After graduating from Rock Hill High School in 1971, Norman earned a Bachelor of Science degree in business from Presbyterian College in 1975.

== Career ==
Norman was a real estate developer at the Warren Norman Company, a business founded by Norman's father.

=== South Carolina House of Representatives ===
In 2004, Norman was elected to serve District 48 in the South Carolina House of Representatives, winning a three-way Republican primary outright with 52% of the vote. After one term, Norman chose not to run for reelection so he could become the 2006 Republican candidate for U.S. Congress in South Carolina's 5th congressional district against John Spratt. He lost to Spratt.

On November 3, 2009, Norman defeated Democrat Kathy Cantrell in a special election to reclaim his old seat.

== U.S. House of Representatives ==
=== Elections ===
==== 2017 special election ====
In December 2016, President Donald Trump nominated Mick Mulvaney for Director of the Office of Management and Budget (OMB). At the time, Mulvaney represented South Carolina's 5th Congressional District in the United States House of Representatives. Shortly after the nomination, and in anticipation that Mulvaney's seat in Congress would be vacated once the United States Senate confirmed him, Norman announced his intention to resign from the South Carolina House of Representatives to run for Congress.

On May 16, 2017, Norman won a Republican primary runoff election against Tommy Pope by a margin of 0.6%, triggering an automatic recount per South Carolina state law. Following that recount, the South Carolina State Election Commission certified Norman as the Republican nominee on May 19, 2017. With 35,425 votes cast, Norman received 17,823 to Pope's 17,602, a 221-vote difference.

Having secured the Republican nomination, Norman faced Democratic nominee Sumter attorney Archie Parnell in a special election on June 20. Norman received 51.0% of the vote to Parnell's 47.9%.

Norman was sworn into office on June 26, 2017.

==== 2018 ====
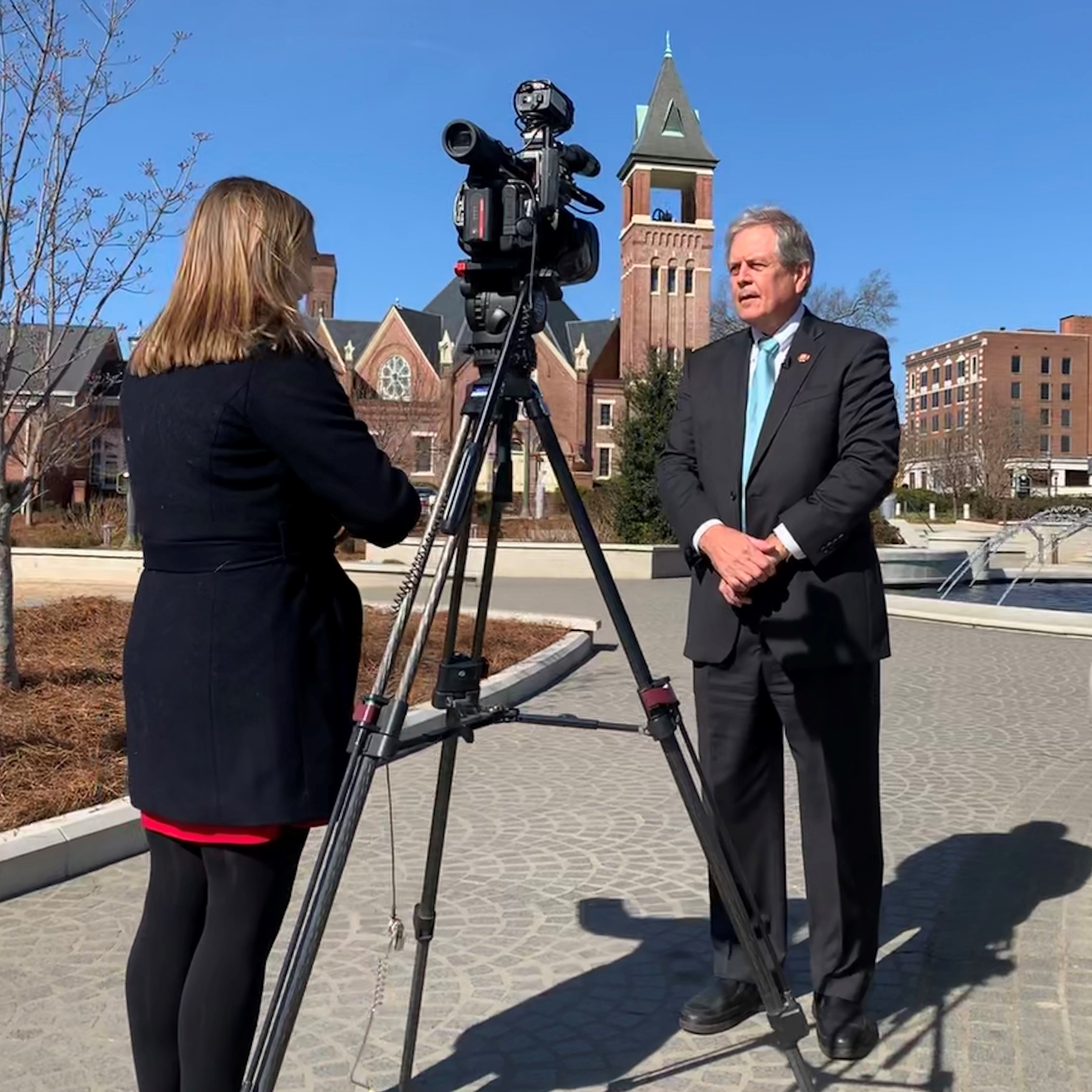
Norman being interviewed in 2019

On March 19, 2018, Norman filed for reelection with the South Carolina Election Commission. Facing no primary challengers, he secured the Republican party nomination after the primary election on June 12.

Meanwhile, Parnell chose to run again for South Carolina's 5th Congressional District seat. He defeated three opponents to win the Democratic nomination, and faced Norman again in the general election.

The general election was on November 6. Norman was reelected with 57.0% of the vote to Parnell's 41.5%. State and national Democrats had distanced themselves from Parnell after news broke that he had abused his first wife.

==== 2020 ====
Norman filed for reelection on March 16, 2020. He secured the Republican nomination after facing no Republican challengers in the primary election on June 12.

Norman went on to defeat Democrat Mauricus "Moe" Brown in the general election on November 3. He received 60.1% of the vote to Brown's 39.9%.

2022

Norman defeated Democratic nominee Evangeline Hundley with 64% of the total votes compared to her 34.5%. In 2024, he defeated Hundley once more, with 63.5% of the total votes to her 36.3%.

=== Tenure ===
==== Silfab Solar controversy ====
In 2024, Norman became the target of protests from members of his district over the plan for Canadian solar panel manufacturer Silfab Solar, Inc. to build a manufacturing plant in his district. The controversy stems around the Canadian company's plan to use the toxic gas Silane at a site zoned by the York County Zoning Board as "Light Industrial". The proposed site sits adjacent to an elementary and middle school, prompting fears there would not be time to evacuate thousands of children in time. The York County Board of Zoning Appeals ruled unanimously that York County staff erred and solar panel and cell manufacturing is prohibited, reversing York County staff’s interpretation on May 9, 2024. Silfab appealed the York zoning vote, though the county has asserted they don't have to, in violation of the order of the Board of Zoning appeals decision.

Norman became a target of the protest due to his founding of the Bipartisan Congressional Solar Caucus with Illinois Democrat Raja Krishnamoorthi.

==== Kavanaugh hearings joke ====
On September 20, 2018, at an election debate for the Republican nomination, Norman joked about sexual assault allegations against Supreme Court nominee Brett Kavanaugh. He kicked off the debate by asking the audience, "Did y'all hear this latest late-breaking news on the Kavanaugh hearings? ... Ruth Bader Ginsburg came out saying she was groped by Abraham Lincoln."

==== Firearm incident ====
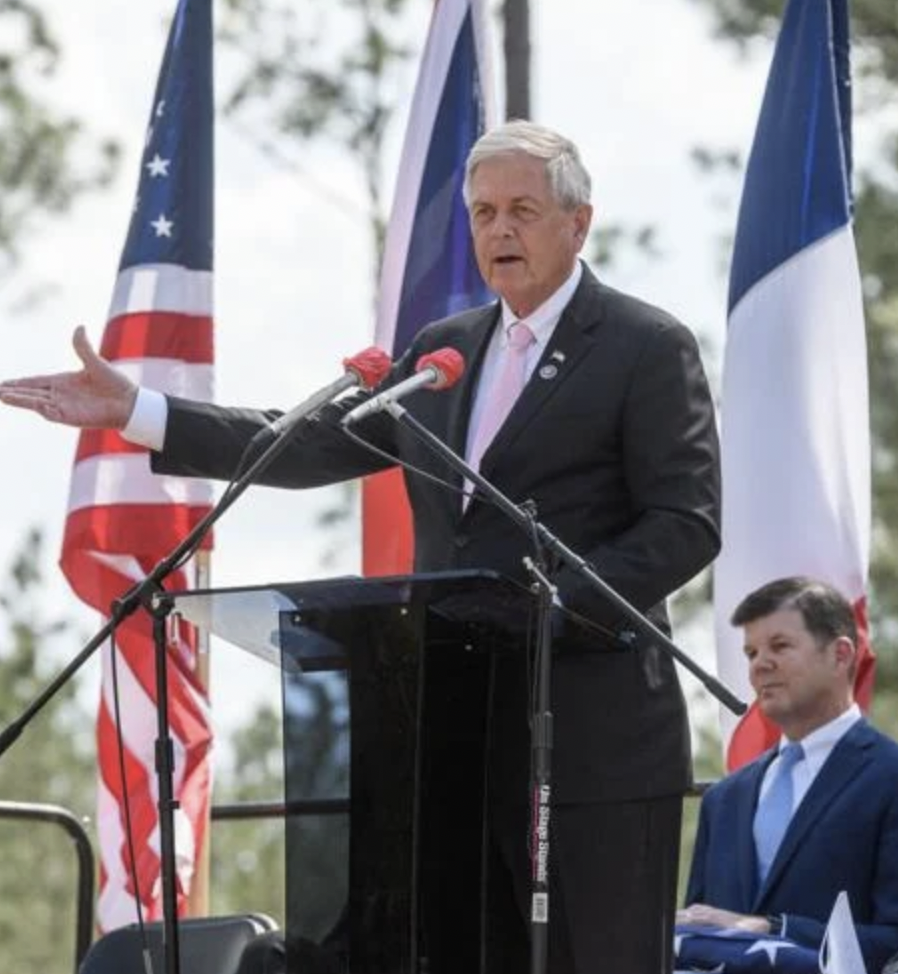
Norman speaking in Camden, SC at the reburial ceremony of 13 American Revolutionary War soldiers

At a public meeting for constituents on April 6, 2018, Norman engaged in a conversation with representatives from Moms Demand Action for Gun Sense in America (MDA). During that conversation, he placed his .38-caliber Smith & Wesson handgun on the table to illustrate his belief that "gun violence is a spiritual, mental or people issue, not a gun issue." According to Norman, the loaded firearm was visible for "maybe a minute, or two minutes" and was never pointed at any individual, but MDA representatives who were seated at the table with Norman said the firearm was visible for "five to 10 minutes" and that they felt unsafe. Norman holds a concealed weapons permit issued by South Carolina.

The incident sparked widespread criticism of Norman. On April 9, 2018, South Carolina Democratic Party Chair Trav Robertson wrote the South Carolina Law Enforcement Division a letter requesting felony charges against Norman for his conduct. The case was originally assigned to South Carolina 16th Solicitor Kevin Brackett, but Brackett recused himself, citing a "personal friendship" with Norman. The issue was then forwarded to South Carolina Attorney General Alan Wilson, who declined to press charges, stating that Norman's actions did not "warrant a criminal investigation" or constitute "a prosecutable offense."

==== Conservative Political Action Conference attendance ====
In late February 2021, Norman and a dozen other Republican House members skipped votes and enlisted others to vote for them, citing the ongoing COVID-19 pandemic. But he and the other members were actually attending the Conservative Political Action Conference, which was held at the same time as their slated absences. In response, the Campaign for Accountability, an ethics watchdog group, filed a complaint with the House Committee on Ethics and requested an investigation into Norman and the other lawmakers.

==== Conservative Opportunity Society ====
In 2021, Norman was elected chair of the Conservative Opportunity Society.

==== COVID-19 pandemic ====
In 2021, Norman violated House rules by not wearing a face mask in the House Chamber and was fined $500 as provided by the rules. Despite committing the infraction, he and two other Republican lawmakers sued Speaker Nancy Pelosi over the incident. Norman tested positive for COVID-19 on August 5, 2021, and reported that he had been fully vaccinated and had only mild symptoms.

==== Federal loans ====
In August 2022, Norman criticized President Joe Biden for forgiving up to $10,000 of student loan debt for eligible borrowers. Norman was criticized for hypocrisy because he had $306,520 of debt from his PPP loan forgiven.

==== Biden impeachment inquiry ====
Norman supported the inquiry into an impeachment of Joe Biden, and said on the House floor that Biden would need to "prove" his innocence:

The evidence, I think, as things come out, will finally show what the trail is, and the fact that there are consequences. You cannot just say you are innocent and not have to prove it.

==== Chuck Edwards censuring ====
In September 2026, in a vote to censure representative Chuck Edwards following a House Ethics Committee sexual harassment investigation, Norman was the only representative other than Edwards who voted against the censuring.

=== Committee assignments ===
- Committee on Financial Services
  - Subcommittee on Housing and Insurance
  - Subcommittee on Financial Institutions
- Committee on the Budget
- Committee on Rules
  - Subcommittee on Legislative and Budget Process

=== Caucus memberships ===
- Republican Study Committee
- Freedom Caucus
- Rare Disease Caucus
- Congressional Motorcycle Caucus
- Congressional Solar Caucus
- Congressional Western Caucus
- Congressional Waste-Cutters Caucus
- Congressional Blockchain Caucus
- United States–China Working Group

== 2026 South Carolina gubernatorial campaign ==
On July 25, 2025, Norman announced he was running for Governor of South Carolina in the 2026 election. Norman held a formal launch event on July 27 in his district's city of Rock Hill. Norman joined a growing Republican primary field that included Attorney General Alan Wilson, Lieutenant Governor Pamela Evette, State Senator Josh Kimbrell, and U.S. Representative Nancy Mace.

Norman campaigned on a platform to "clean up Columbia" and framed himself as an anti-establishment conservative. Key policy proposals from his campaign launch included passing term limits, improving the state's roads and schools, creating a South Carolina Department of Government Efficiency, and allowing residents to elect judges. Touting his record as a member of the conservative House Freedom Caucus, his campaign website states he is "100% Pro-Life and 100% Pro-Gun." His platform emphasized his background as a fiscal conservative with an "appetite for cutting federal spending," pointing to his efforts in Congress to slash public benefits for illegal immigrants and implement strict work requirements for Medicaid as proof of his commitment to these values.

Norman failed to advance to the runoff, finishing in 3rd place to Evette and Wilson. He endorsed Wilson in the subsequent runoff.

== 2026 U.S. Senate campaign ==
On July 18, 2026, Norman announced that he would run in the special primary election for the U.S. Senate seat formerly held by Lindsey Graham, who died a week prior. On August 11, 2026, Norman finished second in the special primary election, advancing to a runoff against US Senate incumbent Darline Graham, who had been appointed by Governor McMaster to finish out her brother's term. On August 25, 2026, Norman was defeated by Darline Graham in the special primary election runoff.

Following the defeat, Norman refused to endorse Trump-endorsed Republican candidate Darline Graham, claiming she was unqualified for the position. Norman's son, Warren Norman, also chose to endorse Annie Andrews for the Senate seat.

== Political positions ==
=== Steve King ===
In 2019, Norman joined a small group of House Republicans who sought to reinstate Representative Steve King on House committees. King had lost his committee positions due to a series of racist and white nationalist remarks. The group included Louie Gohmert and Paul Gosar. King was not reinstated.

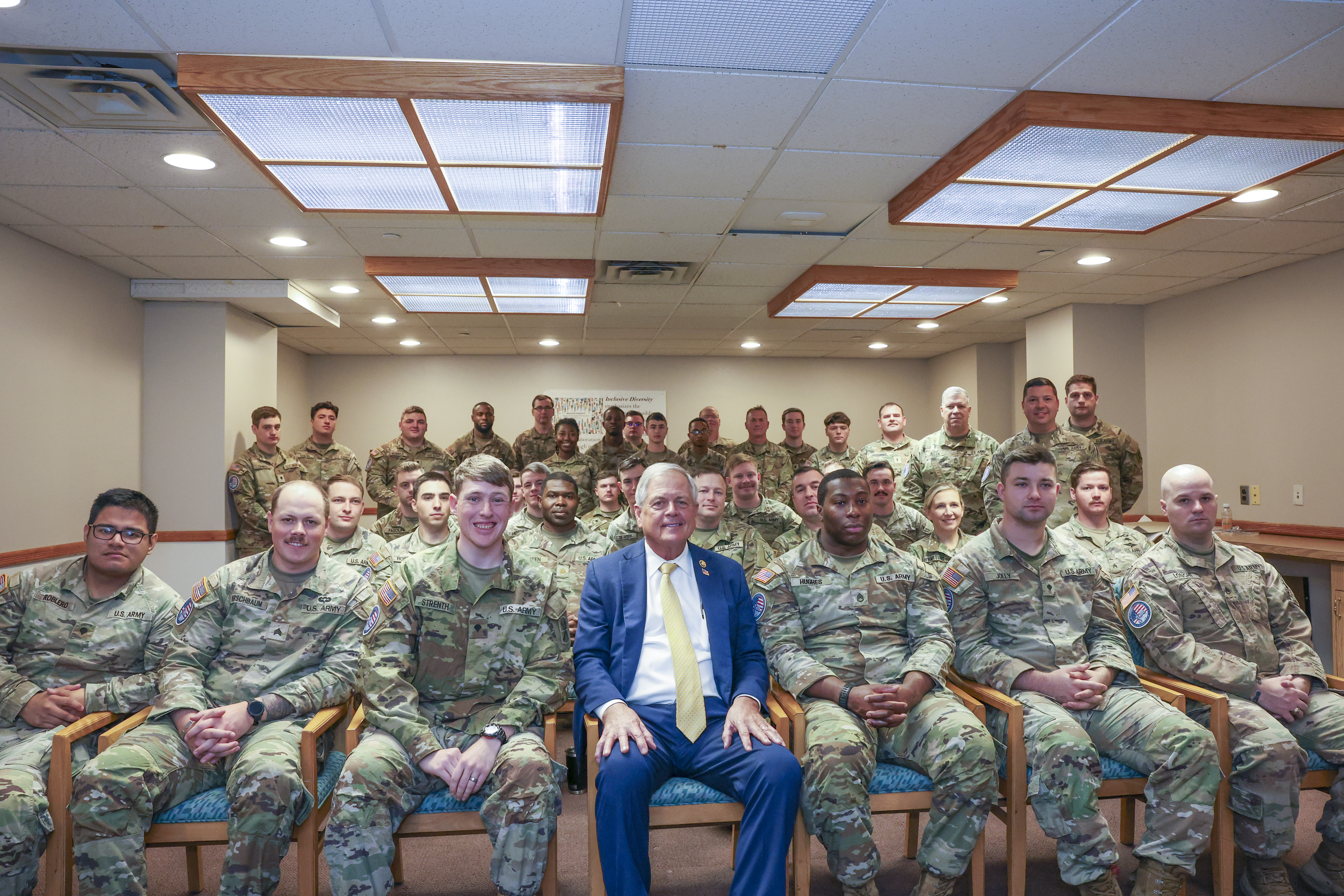
Norman Meets with South Carolina Army National Guard Soldiers during the 60th Presidential Inauguration, 2025.

=== Donald Trump ===
Norman was described as a Trump ally during Donald Trump's presidency. After Joe Biden won the 2020 presidential election and Trump made claims of election fraud, Norman called for an investigation into fraud.

On October 31, 2019, Norman voted with his fellow Republicans in opposition to a resolution outlining rules for then-ongoing impeachment inquiry against Donald Trump. On December 18, 2019, Norman voted against both of the articles of impeachment of the first impeachment of President Trump.

After Trump was impeached for his alleged incitement of a pro-Trump mob to storm the U.S. Capitol over false claims of election fraud, Norman criticized Representative Liz Cheney for voting to impeach Trump. Norman said he was "bothered by Cheney's attitude". Norman himself voted against the second impeachment of Trump. On January 17, 2021, Norman sent a text message to White House Chief of Staff Mark Meadows asking him to urge President Trump to invoke martial law (misspelling it 'Marshall Law') to prevent the inauguration of Joe Biden.

However, Norman endorsed and campaigned for his decades-long ally Nikki Haley for president over Trump in the 2024 Republican primaries. He was the only member of the U.S. Congress to endorse Haley.

=== Biden administration ===
Norman supported efforts to impeach President Biden. During the 117th United States Congress, he co-sponsored two resolutions to impeach Biden. He also co-sponsored resolutions to impeach Vice President Kamala Harris, Secretary of Homeland Security Alejandro Mayorkas, and Secretary of State Antony Blinken.

=== US–Mexico border ===
In February 2022, Norman co-sponsored the Secure America's Borders First Act, which would prohibit the expenditure or obligation of military and security assistance to Kyiv over the U.S. border with Mexico.

=== Epstein files ===
As a member of the United States House Committee on Rules, on July 14, 2025, he voted in support of an amendment by Congressman Ro Khanna which would in essence order the release of the Jeffrey Epstein files. The amendment, which included the language that "affirms Congress's Article I authority to conduct oversight, demands that the Trump Administration release the Epstein files, calls on the Department of Justice and FBI to submit a report on any delays, suppression, or destruction of evidence related to the files, and supports full transparency and access to these documents in the interest of justice and accountability" was defeated with 8 "nay" votes and 4 "yea" votes. Explaining why he joined Democrats, Norman said: “The public’s been asking for it. I think there are files. All of a sudden not to have files is a little strange. We’ll see how it plays out… I think the president will do the right thing.”

Subsequently, on September 2, 2025, Norman voted against a resolution calling for a floor vote in the House on the bipartisan Epstein Files Transparency Act. The measure would have allowed the Justice Department to withhold or redact files that “contain personally identifiable information of victims or victims’ personal and medical files and similar files the disclosure of which would constitute a clearly unwarranted invasion of personal privacy.” Norman said that he preferred to review alternative measures and stated “We’re all for releasing the information and getting this moving forward,” he said. The resolution was defeated on party lines vote with Norman voting in the negative.

== Electoral history ==
2004 South Carolina House of Representatives District 48 Republican primary
| Party | Candidate | Votes | % |
|---|---|---|---|
| Republican | Ralph W. Norman | 1,956 | 52.7% |
| Republican | Peggy Upchurch | 937 | 25.2% |
| Republican | Michael Johnson | 821 | 22.1% |
| Total votes | | 3,714 | 100.0% |

2004 South Carolina House of Representatives District 48 election
| Party | Candidate | Votes | % |
|---|---|---|---|
| Republican | Ralph W. Norman | 15,120 | 99.5% |
| Write-in | | 81 | 0.5% |
| Total votes | | 15,201 | 100.0% |

2006 South Carolina's 5th congressional district election
| Party | Candidate | Votes | % |
|---|---|---|---|
| Democratic | John Spratt | 99,669 | 56.9% |
| Republican | Ralph Norman | 75,422 | 43.1% |
| Write-in | | 63 | 0.04% |
| Total votes | | 175,154 | 100.0% |

2009 South Carolina House of Representatives District 48 special Republican primary
| Party | Candidate | Votes | % |
|---|---|---|---|
| Republican | Ralph W Norman | 2,665 | 69.0% |
| Republican | Roger Costner | 1,156 | 29.9% |
| Republican | Sam Rhodes | 40 | 1.0% |
| Total votes | | 3,861 | 100.0% |

2009 South Carolina House of Representatives District 48 special election
| Party | Candidate | Votes | % |
|---|---|---|---|
| Republican | Ralph W Norman | 4,610 | 71.9% |
| Democratic | Kathy F Cantrell | 1,791 | 27.9% |
| Write-in | | 14 | 0.2% |
| Total votes | | 6,415 | 100.0% |

2010 South Carolina House of Representatives District 48 election
| Party | Candidate | Votes | % |
|---|---|---|---|
| Republican | Ralph W Norman (incumbent) | 15,077 | 80.1% |
| Libertarian | Stan Smith | 3,693 | 19.6% |
| Write-in | | 48 | 0.3% |
| Total votes | | 18,818 | 100.0% |

2012 South Carolina House of Representatives District 48 election
| Party | Candidate | Votes | % |
|---|---|---|---|
| Republican | Ralph W Norman (incumbent) | 13,762 | 98.7% |
| Write-in | | 184 | 1.3% |
| Total votes | | 13,946 | 100.0% |

2014 South Carolina House of Representatives District 48 election
| Party | Candidate | Votes | % |
|---|---|---|---|
| Republican | Ralph W Norman (incumbent) | 7,582 | 73.2% |
| Democratic | Barry McGrew | 2,762 | 26.7% |
| Write-in | | 8 | 0.1% |
| Total votes | | 10,352 | 100.0% |

2016 South Carolina House of Representatives District 48 election
| Party | Candidate | Votes | % |
|---|---|---|---|
| Republican | Ralph W Norman (incumbent) | 15,939 | 98.6% |
| Write-in | | 225 | 1.4% |
| Total votes | | 16,164 | 100.0% |

South Carolina's 5th congressional district special election Republican primary, 2017
| Party | Candidate | Votes | % |
|---|---|---|---|
| Republican | Tommy Pope | 11,943 | 30.4% |
| Republican | Ralph Norman | 11,808 | 30.1% |
| Republican | Tom Mullikin | 7,759 | 19.8% |
| Republican | Chad Connelly | 5,546 | 14.1% |
| Republican | Sheri Few | 1,930 | 4.9% |
| Republican | Kris Wampler | 197 | 0.5% |
| Republican | Ray Craig | 87 | 0.2% |
| Total votes | | 39,270 | 100.0% |
Runoff election
| Republican | Ralph Norman | 17,823 | 50.3% |
| Republican | Tommy Pope | 17,602 | 49.7% |
| Total votes | | 35,425 | 100.0% |

South Carolina's 5th congressional district special election, 2017
| Party | Candidate | Votes | % | ±% |
|---|---|---|---|---|
| Republican | Ralph Norman | 45,076 | 51.0% | −8.0% |
| Democratic | Archie Parnell | 42,341 | 47.9% | +9.2% |
| American | Josh Thornton | 319 | 0.4% | −1.7% |
| Libertarian | Victor Kocher | 273 | 0.3% | N/A |
| Green | David Kulma | 242 | 0.3% | N/A |
| Write-In | Write-in | 65 | 0.1% | +0.3% |
| Total votes | | 88,316 | 100.0% | |
| Republican hold | | | | |

South Carolina's 5th congressional district, 2018
| Party | Candidate | Votes | % |
|---|---|---|---|
| Republican | Ralph Norman (incumbent) | 141,757 | 57.0 |
| Democratic | Archie Parnell | 103,129 | 41.5 |
| Constitution | Michael Chandler | 3,443 | 1.4 |
| n/a | Write-ins | 250 | 0.1 |
| Total votes | | 248,579 | 100.0 |
| Republican hold | | | |

South Carolina's 5th congressional district, 2020
| Party | Candidate | Votes | % |
|---|---|---|---|
| Republican | Ralph Norman (incumbent) | 220,006 | 60.1 |
| Democratic | Moe Brown | 145,979 | 39.9 |
| Write-in | | 273 | 0.1 |
| Total votes | | 366,258 | 100.0 |
| Republican hold | | | |

South Carolina's 5th congressional district, 2022
| Party | Candidate | Votes | % |
|---|---|---|---|
| Republican | Ralph Norman (incumbent) | 154,725 | 64.0 |
| Democratic | Evangeline Hundley | 83,299 | 34.5 |
| Green | Larry Gaither | 3,547 | 1.5 |
| Write-in | | 136 | 0.1 |
| Total votes | | 241,707 | 100.0 |
| Republican hold | | | |

South Carolina's 5th congressional district, 2024
| Party | Candidate | Votes | % |
|---|---|---|---|
| Republican | Ralph Norman (incumbent) | 228,260 | 63.5 |
| Democratic | Evangeline Hundley | 130,592 | 36.3 |
| Write-in | | 557 | 0.2 |
| Total votes | | 359,409 | 100.0 |
| Republican hold | | | |

2026 United States Senate special Republican primary in South Carolina
| Party | Candidate | Votes | % |
|---|---|---|---|
| Republican | Darline Graham (incumbent) | 109,881 | 32.7% |
| Republican | Ralph Norman | 82,627 | 24.6% |
| Republican | Russell Fry | 65,955 | 19.7% |
| Republican | Mark Sanford | 50,136 | 14.9% |
| Republican | Mark Lynch | 19,892 | 5.9% |
| Republican | Danny Ford II | 2,804 | 0.84% |
| Republican | Duke Buckner | 1,583 | 0.47% |
| Republican | Glenda Gail Parker | 977 | 0.29% |
| Republican | Samuel Sam Shepherd | 931 | 0.28% |
| Republican | Mark McBride | 769 | 0.23% |
| Total votes | | 335,555 | 100.0% |

2026 United States Senate special Republican primary runoff in South Carolina
| Party | Candidate | Votes | % |
|---|---|---|---|
| Republican | Darline Graham (incumbent) | 193,486 | 52.4% |
| Republican | Ralph Norman | 175,412 | 47.6% |
| Total votes | | 368,898 | 100.0% |

2026 South Carolina gubernatorial election Republican primary
| Party | Candidate | Votes | % |
|---|---|---|---|
| Republican | Pamela Evette | 136,480 | 28.9 |
| Republican | Alan Wilson | 123,643 | 26.2 |
| Republican | Ralph Norman | 80,790 | 17.1 |
| Republican | Rom Reddy | 66,992 | 14.2 |
| Republican | Nancy Mace | 57,380 | 12.1 |
| Republican | Josh Kimbrell (withdrawn) | 3,957 | 0.8 |
| Republican | Jacqueline DuBose (decertified) | 3,714 | 0.8 |
| Total votes | | 472,956 | 100.0 |

== Personal life ==
Norman resides in Rock Hill with his wife Elaine. They have four children and 17 grandchildren.

Norman is a Presbyterian.

U.S. House of Representatives
| Preceded by Mick Mulvaney | Member of the U.S. House of Representatives from South Carolina's 1st congressional district 2017–present | Incumbent |
U.S. order of precedence (ceremonial)
| Preceded by Jimmy Gomez | United States representatives by seniority 181st | Succeeded by Michael Cloud |
