= 2018 United States House of Representatives elections in South Carolina =

- November 6, 2018

All 7 South Carolina seats to the United States House of Representatives
- Turnout: 55.03%
	Majority party	Minority party
Party	Republican	Democratic
Last election	6	1
Seats won	5	2
Seat change	▼1	▲1
Popular vote	927,494	758,340
Percentage	54.29%	44.37%
Swing	▼6.24%	▲4.90%

Republican
50–60%
60–70%
70–80%
Democratic
50–60%
60–70%
70–80%
80–90%
Winners
Republican hold
Democratic hold
Democratic gain

The 2018 United States House of Representatives elections in South Carolina were held on November 6, 2018, to elect the seven U.S. representatives from the state of South Carolina, one from each of the state's seven congressional districts. The elections coincided with a gubernatorial election, as well as other elections to the House of Representatives, elections to the United States Senate and various state and local elections.

This was the first time that the Democrats picked up a seat in South Carolina since 1986. The state congressional delegation changed from 6–1 for Republicans to 5–2 for Republicans. This is the only time since 2008 that Democrats had won more than one U.S. House seat in South Carolina.

== Results summary ==
=== Statewide ===
Party	Candi- dates	Votes		Seats		
Party	Candi- dates	No.	%	No.	+/–	%
Republican Party	7	927,494	54.29%	5	▼1	71.43%
Democratic Party	7	758,340	44.37%	2	▲1	28.57%
American Party	3	15,011	0.88%	0	Steady	0.00%
Constitution Party	1	3,443	0.20%	0	Steady	0.00%
Green Party	1	3,214	0.19%	0	Steady	0.00%
Write-in	7	1,790	0.10%	0	Steady	0.00%
Total	26	1,709,292	100.00%	7	Steady	100.00%

Popular vote
Republican	54.29%
Democratic	44.37%
Other	1.37%

House seats
Republican	71.43%
Democratic	28.57%

=== District ===
Results of the 2018 United States House of Representatives elections in South Carolina by district:

District	Republican		Democratic		Others		Total		Result
District	Votes	%	Votes	%	Votes	%	Votes	%	Result
District 1	141,473	49.22%	145,455	50.60%	505	0.18%	287,433	100.00%	Democratic gain
District 2	144,642	56.25%	109,199	42.47%	3,298	1.28%	257,139	100.00%	Republican hold
District 3	153,338	67.79%	70,046	30.97%	2,820	1.25%	226,204	100.00%	Republican hold
District 4	145,321	59.57%	89,182	36.56%	9,447	3.87%	243,950	100.00%	Republican hold
District 5	141,757	57.03%	103,129	41.49%	3,693	1.49%	248,579	100.00%	Republican hold
District 6	58,282	28.23%	144,765	70.13%	3,386	1.64%	206,433	100.00%	Democratic hold
District 7	142,681	59.56%	96,564	40.31%	309	0.13%	239,554	100.00%	Republican hold
Total	927,494	54.26%	758,340	44.37%	23,458	1.37%	1,709,292	100.00%	.

== District 1 ==
2018 South Carolina's 1st congressional district election
- November 6, 2018
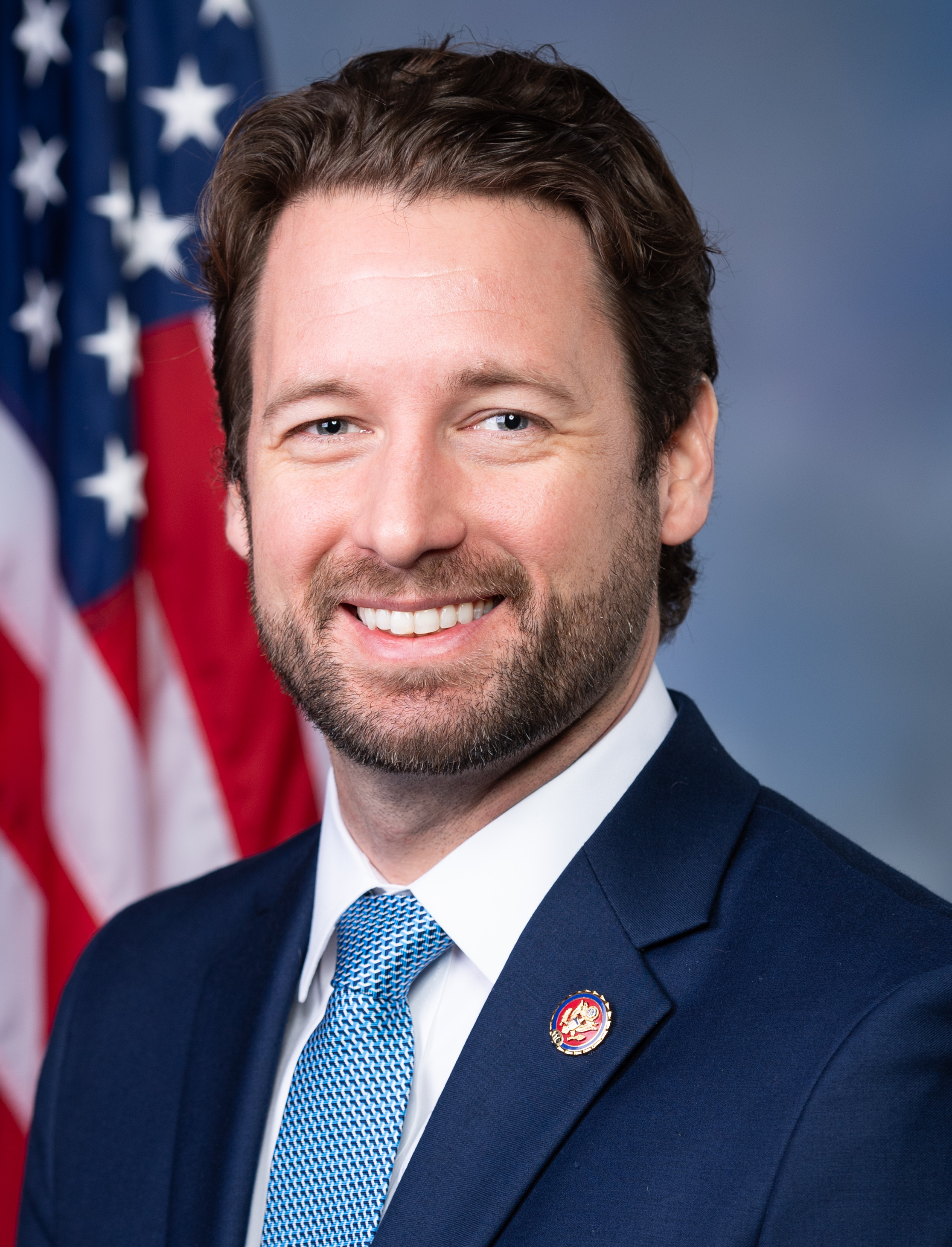

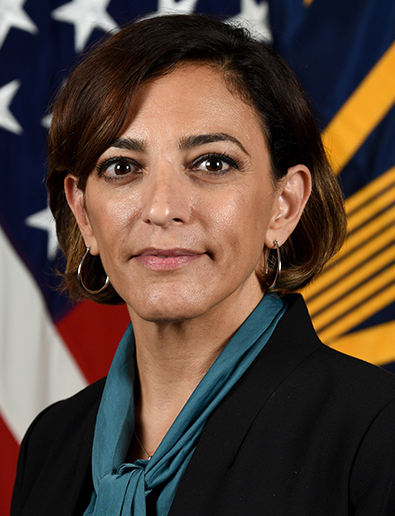
Nominee	Joe Cunningham	Katie Arrington
Party	Democratic	Republican
Popular vote	145,455	141,473
Percentage	50.6%	49.2%
- County results Cunningham: 50–60% Arrington: 50–60% 70–80%
U.S. Representative before election
Mark Sanford
Republican
Elected U.S. Representative
Joe Cunningham
Democratic

The 1st district is located in the Low Country, on the Atlantic coastal plain from Hilton Head to the border of Georgetown County, it includes most of the Charleston area. The incumbent was Republican Mark Sanford, who had represented the district since 2013. Sanford was defeated by Republican Katie Arrington in the primary. Arrington lost the general election to Democrat Joe Cunningham.

=== Democratic primary ===
==== Results ====
Democratic primary results
Party	Candidate	Votes	%
Democratic	Joe Cunningham	23,443	71.5
Democratic	Toby Smith	9,342	28.5
Total votes		32,785	100.0

=== Republican primary ===
Sanford defeated State Representative Jenny Horne in the 2016 primary by only a 56-44 percent margin. The closer than expected result led to speculation that Sanford could be vulnerable to another primary challenge in 2018. Former director of the South Carolina Department of Health and Environmental Control Catherine Templeton was reportedly being recruited to challenge Sanford, but decided instead to run for governor.

==== Polling ====
Poll source	Date(s) administered	Sample size	Margin of error	Katie Arrington	Mark Sanford	Undecided
Palmetto Politics	May 13–14, 2018	315	± 4.5%	39%	40%	21%

==== Results ====
Republican primary results
Party	Candidate	Votes	%
Republican	Katie Arrington	33,089	50.6
Republican	Mark Sanford (incumbent)	30,428	46.5
Republican	Dimitri Cherny	1,930	2.9
Total votes		65,447	100.0

==== Endorsements ====
Katie Arrington (R)

Executive branch officials

- Donald Trump, 45th president of the United States

State figures

- Keith Summey, North Charleston mayor
Mark Sanford (R)

U.S. representatives

- Justin Amash, U.S. congressman (I-MI)
- Joe Walsh, former U.S. congressman (R-IL)

Organizations

- FreedomWorks
- National Federation of Independent Business
- Tea Party Patriots

=== General election ===
==== Predictions ====
Source	Ranking	As of
538	Likely R	November 6, 2018
Daily Kos	Lean R	November 5, 2018
RCP	Lean R	November 5, 2018
Sabato's Crystal Ball	Lean R	November 5, 2018
Inside Elections	Likely R	November 5, 2018
The Cook Political Report	Lean R	November 5, 2018

==== Debates ====
- Complete video of debate, October 16, 2018

==== Polling ====
Poll source	Date(s) administered	Sample size	Margin of error	Katie Arrington (R)	Joe Cunningham (D)	Undecided
Public Policy Polling (D)	August 30–31, 2018	628	± 3.9%	49%	42%	9%

==== Results ====
South Carolina's 1st congressional district, 2018
Party	Candidate	Votes	%
Democratic	Joe Cunningham	145,455	50.6
Republican	Katie Arrington	141,473	49.2
n/a	Write-ins	505	0.2
Total votes		287,433	100.0
Democratic gain from Republican			

== District 2 ==
2018 South Carolina's 2nd congressional district election
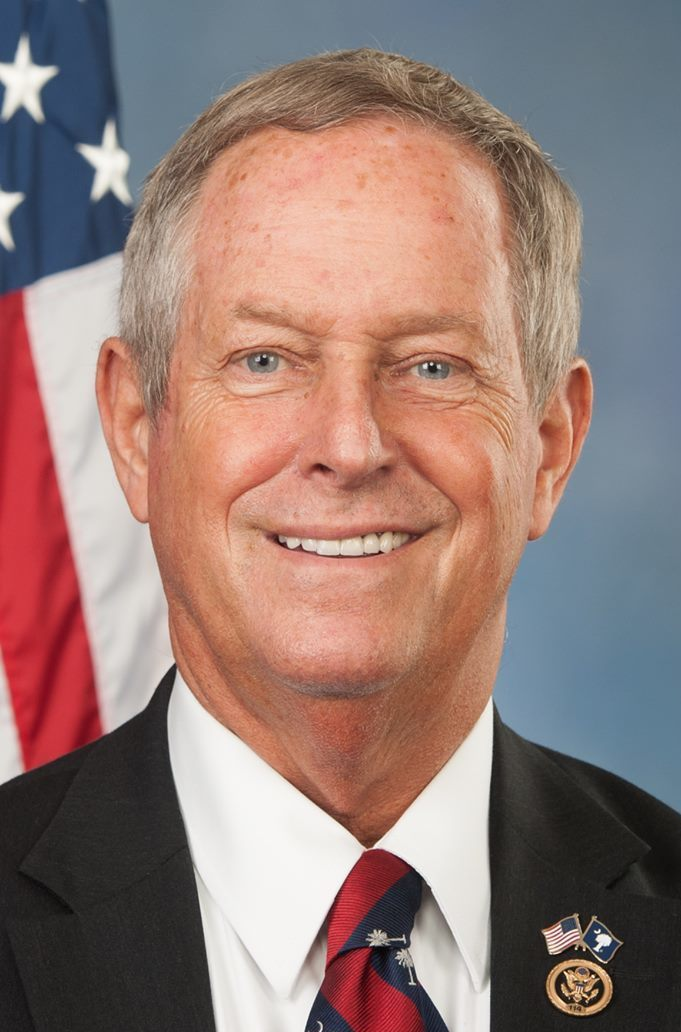

Nominee	Joe Wilson	Sean Carrigan
Party	Republican	Democratic
Popular vote	144,642	109,199
Percentage	56.2%	42.5%
- County results Wilson: 50–60% 60–70% Carrigan: 50–60%
U.S. Representative before election
Joe Wilson
Republican
Elected U.S. Representative
Joe Wilson
Republican

The 2nd district is located in central South Carolina and spans from Columbia to the South Carolina side of the Augusta, Georgia metropolitan area. The incumbent was Republican Joe Wilson, who had represented the district since 2001. Wilson was re-elected with 60% of the vote in 2016 and ran unopposed in the Republican primary.

=== Democratic primary ===
==== Results ====
Democratic primary results
Party	Candidate	Votes	%
Democratic	Annabelle Robertson	14,109	41.8
Democratic	Sean Carrigan	13,469	39.9
Democratic	Phil Black	6,200	18.4
Total votes		33,778	100.0

==== Runoff results ====
Democratic primary runoff results
Party	Candidate	Votes	%
Democratic	Sean Carrigan	5,726	53.36
Democratic	Annabelle Robertson	5,004	46.64
Total votes		10,730	100.0

=== General election ===
==== Predictions ====
Source	Ranking	As of
The Cook Political Report	Safe R	November 5, 2018
Inside Elections	Safe R	November 5, 2018
Sabato's Crystal Ball	Safe R	November 5, 2018
RCP	Safe R	November 5, 2018
Daily Kos	Safe R	November 5, 2018
538	Safe R	November 7, 2018
CNN	Safe R	October 31, 2018
Politico	Safe R	November 4, 2018

==== Results ====
South Carolina's 2nd congressional district, 2018
Party	Candidate	Votes	%
Republican	Joe Wilson (incumbent)	144,642	56.2
Democratic	Sean Carrigan	109,199	42.5
American	Sonny Narang	3,111	1.2
n/a	Write-ins	187	0.1
Total votes		257,139	100.0
Republican hold			

== District 3 ==
2018 South Carolina's 3rd congressional district election
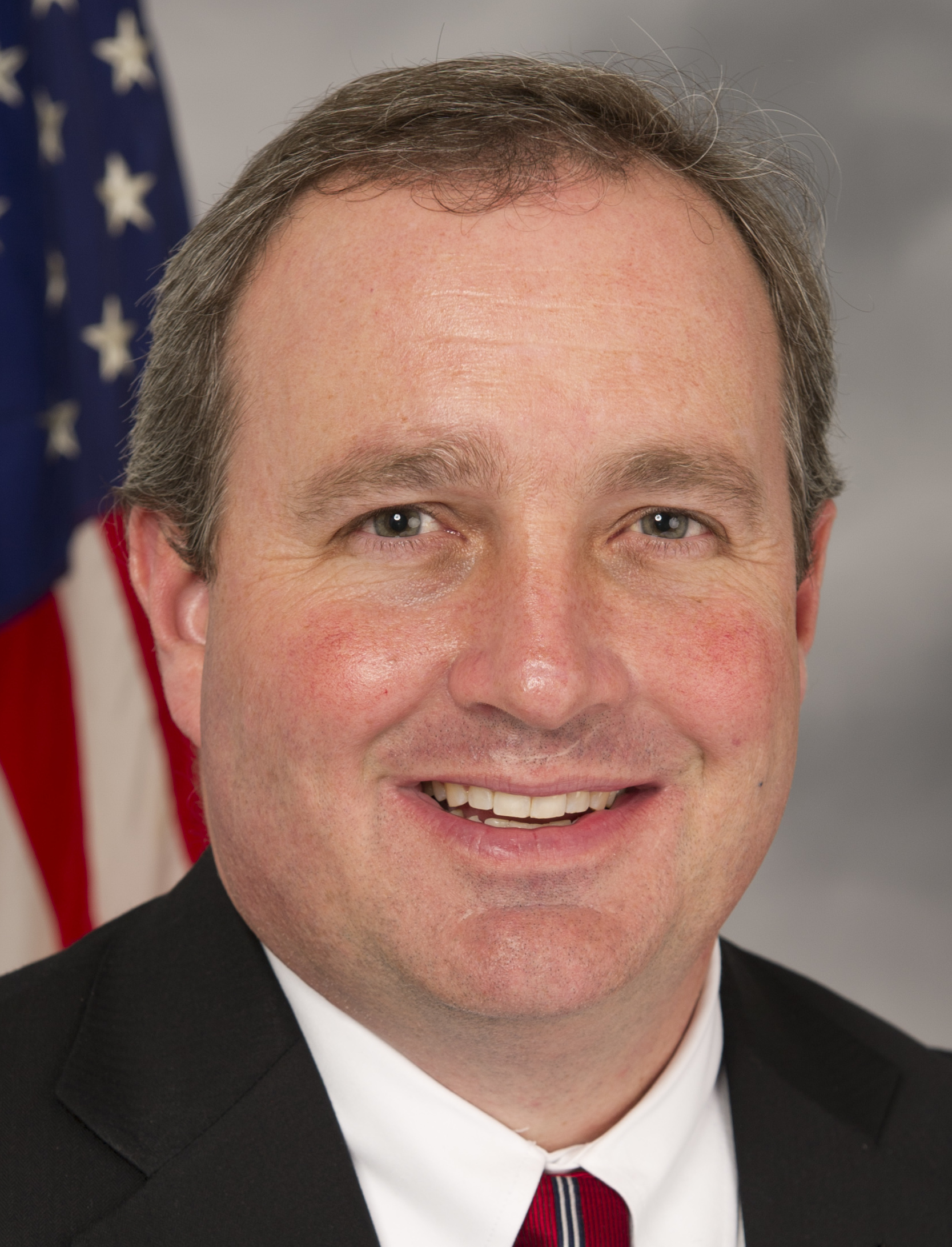

Nominee	Jeff Duncan	Mary Geren
Party	Republican	Democratic
Popular vote	153,338	70,046
Percentage	67.8%	31.0%
- County results Duncan: 50–60% 60–70% 70–80%
U.S. Representative before election
Jeff Duncan
Republican
Elected U.S. Representative
Jeff Duncan
Republican

The 3rd district is located in northwestern South Carolina. The incumbent was Republican Jeff Duncan, who had represented the district since 2011. Duncan was re-elected with 73% of the vote in 2016.

=== Democratic primary ===
==== Results ====
Democratic primary results
Party	Candidate	Votes	%
Democratic	Mary Geren	12,929	69.7
Democratic	Hosea Cleveland	5,615	30.3
Total votes		18,544	100.0

=== General election ===
==== Predictions ====
Source	Ranking	As of
The Cook Political Report	Safe R	November 5, 2018
Inside Elections	Safe R	November 5, 2018
Sabato's Crystal Ball	Safe R	November 5, 2018
RCP	Safe R	November 5, 2018
Daily Kos	Safe R	November 5, 2018
538	Safe R	November 7, 2018
CNN	Safe R	October 31, 2018
Politico	Safe R	November 4, 2018

==== Results ====
South Carolina's 3rd congressional district, 2018
Party	Candidate	Votes	%
Republican	Jeff Duncan (incumbent)	153,338	67.8
Democratic	Mary Geren	70,046	31.0
American	Dave Moore	2,697	1.2
n/a	Write-ins	123	0.0
Total votes		226,204	100.0
Republican hold			

== District 4 ==
2018 South Carolina's 4th congressional district election
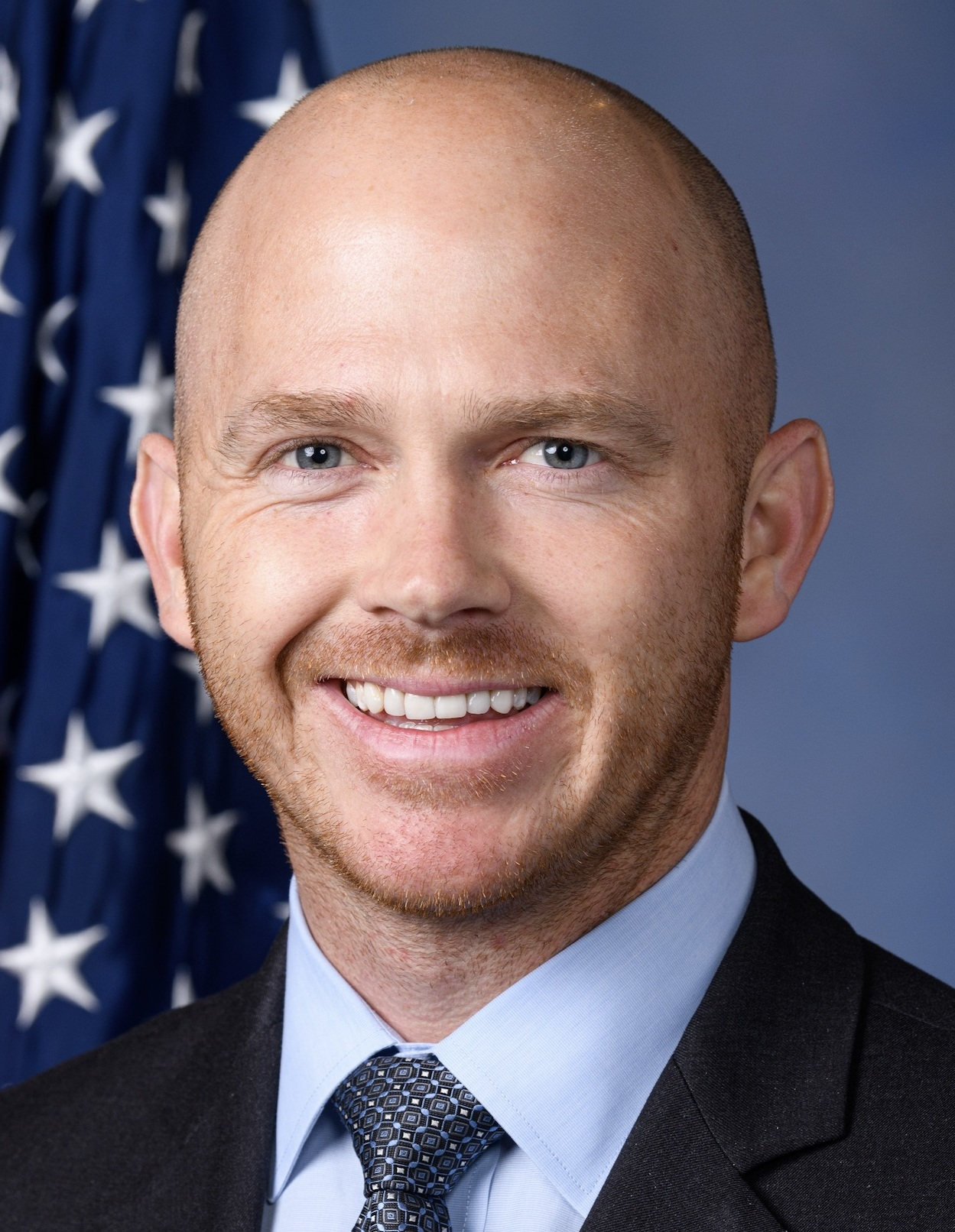

Nominee	William Timmons	Brandon Brown
Party	Republican	Democratic
Popular vote	145,321	89,182
Percentage	59.6%	36.6%
- County results Timmons: 50–60% 60–70%
U.S. Representative before election
Trey Gowdy
Republican
Elected U.S. Representative
William Timmons
Republican

The 4th district is located in Upstate South Carolina. The incumbent was Republican Trey Gowdy, who had represented the district since 2011. Gowdy was re-elected with 67% of the vote in 2016. Gowdy announced in January 2018 that he would not run for re-election in 2018.

=== Democratic primary ===
==== Results ====
Democratic primary results
Party	Candidate	Votes	%
Democratic	Doris Lee Turner	7,021	29.5
Democratic	Brandon P Brown	6,787	28.5
Democratic	Eric Graben	6,126	25.7
Democratic	Will Morin	2,172	9.1
Democratic	J.T. Davis	1,715	7.2
Total votes		23,821	100.0

==== Runoff results ====
Democratic primary runoff results
Party	Candidate	Votes	%
Democratic	Brandon P Brown	7,085	62.11
Democratic	Doris Lee Turner	4,323	37.89
Total votes		11,408	100.0

=== Republican primary ===
==== Results ====
Republican primary results
Party	Candidate	Votes	%
Republican	Lee Bright	16,641	24.9
Republican	William Timmons	12,818	19.2
Republican	Dan Hamilton	12,445	18.6
Republican	Josh Kimbrell	7,422	11.1
Republican	James Epley	5,365	8.0
Republican	Stephen Brown	5,057	7.6
Republican	Shannon Pierce	2,436	3.6
Republican	Mark Burns	1,650	2.5
Republican	Claude Schmid	1,405	2.1
Republican	Dan Albert	510	0.8
Republican	John Marshall Mosser	454	0.7
Republican	Justin David Sanders	352	0.5
Republican	Barry Bell	199	0.3
Total votes		66,754	100.0

Runoff debate
No.	Date	Host	Moderator	Link	Republican	Republican
Key: P Participant A Absent N Not invited I Invited W Withdrawn						
Key: P Participant A Absent N Not invited I Invited W Withdrawn					Lee Bright	William Timmons
1	Jun. 18, 2018	First Monday in Greenville; Greenville County Republican Party; South Carolina Republican Party; WGTK (AM)	Deb Sofield		P	P

==== Runoff results ====
Republican primary runoff results
Party	Candidate	Votes	%
Republican	William Timmons	37,014	54.29
Republican	Lee Bright	31,170	45.71
Total votes		68,184	100.0

=== General election ===
==== Predictions ====
Source	Ranking	As of
The Cook Political Report	Safe R	November 5, 2018
Inside Elections	Safe R	November 5, 2018
Sabato's Crystal Ball	Safe R	November 5, 2018
RCP	Safe R	November 5, 2018
Daily Kos	Safe R	November 5, 2018
538	Safe R	November 7, 2018
CNN	Safe R	October 31, 2018
Politico	Safe R	November 4, 2018

==== Results ====
South Carolina's 4th congressional district, 2018
Party	Candidate	Votes	%
Republican	William Timmons	145,321	59.6
Democratic	Brandon Brown	89,182	36.6
American	Guy Furay	9,203	3.8
n/a	Write-ins	244	0.1
Total votes		243,950	100.0
Republican hold			

== District 5 ==
2018 South Carolina's 5th congressional district election
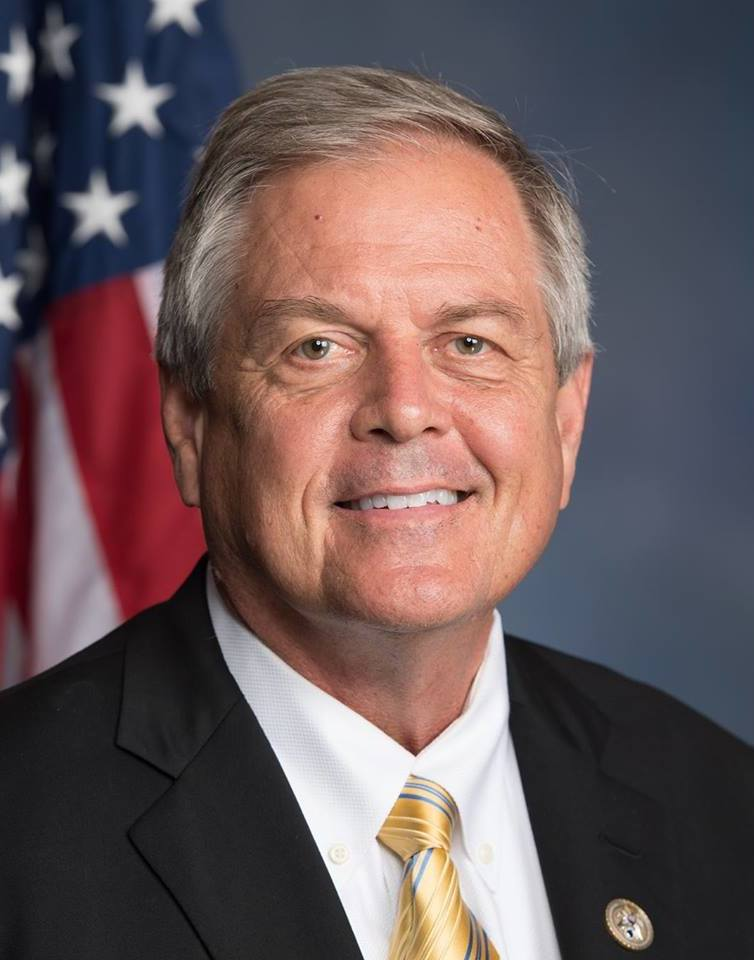

Nominee	Ralph Norman	Archie Parnell
Party	Republican	Democratic
Popular vote	141,757	103,129
Percentage	57.0%	41.5%
- County results Norman: 50–60% 60–70% 70–80% Parnell: 50–60% 60–70%
U.S. Representative before election
Ralph Norman
Republican
Elected U.S. Representative
Ralph Norman
Republican

The 5th district is located in northern South Carolina. The incumbent was Republican Ralph Norman, who had represented the district since 2017. Norman was elected with 51% of the vote in a 2017 special election to replace Mick Mulvaney. Norman's challenger in the special election, Archie Parnell, announced on the 9th of October that he would seek the Democratic nomination for the 2018 election for District 5. The primaries were held on June 12, 2018. Incumbent Ralph Norman was unopposed for the Republican nomination.

=== Democratic primary ===
Special election candidate and former Goldman Sachs employee Parnell had the most fundraising of the four Democratic candidates as of June 9. He was opposed by former York County Councilwoman Sidney Moore, professional clown Steven Lough, and Mark Ali, a formerly illegal immigrant. Parnell's campaign was overshadowed by the resignation of many of his campaign staff after the discovery of allegations of domestic violence committed by him in 1973. However, he refused to drop out of the race, and won the primary with 60% of the vote.

==== Results ====
Democratic primary results
Party	Candidate	Votes	%
Democratic	Archie Parnell	16,610	60.0
Democratic	Sidney Moore	4,753	17.2
Democratic	Mark Ali	3,710	13.4
Democratic	Steve Lough	2,620	9.5
Total votes		27,693	100.0

=== General election ===
==== Predictions ====
Source	Ranking	As of
The Cook Political Report	Safe R	November 5, 2018
Inside Elections	Safe R	November 5, 2018
Sabato's Crystal Ball	Safe R	November 5, 2018
RCP	Safe R	November 5, 2018
Daily Kos	Safe R	November 5, 2018
538	Safe R	November 7, 2018
CNN	Safe R	October 31, 2018
Politico	Safe R	November 4, 2018

==== Results ====
South Carolina's 5th congressional district, 2018
Party	Candidate	Votes	%
Republican	Ralph Norman (incumbent)	141,757	57.0
Democratic	Archie Parnell	103,129	41.5
Constitution	Michael Chandler	3,443	1.4
n/a	Write-ins	250	0.1
Total votes		248,579	100.0
Republican hold			

== District 6 ==
2018 South Carolina's 6th congressional district election
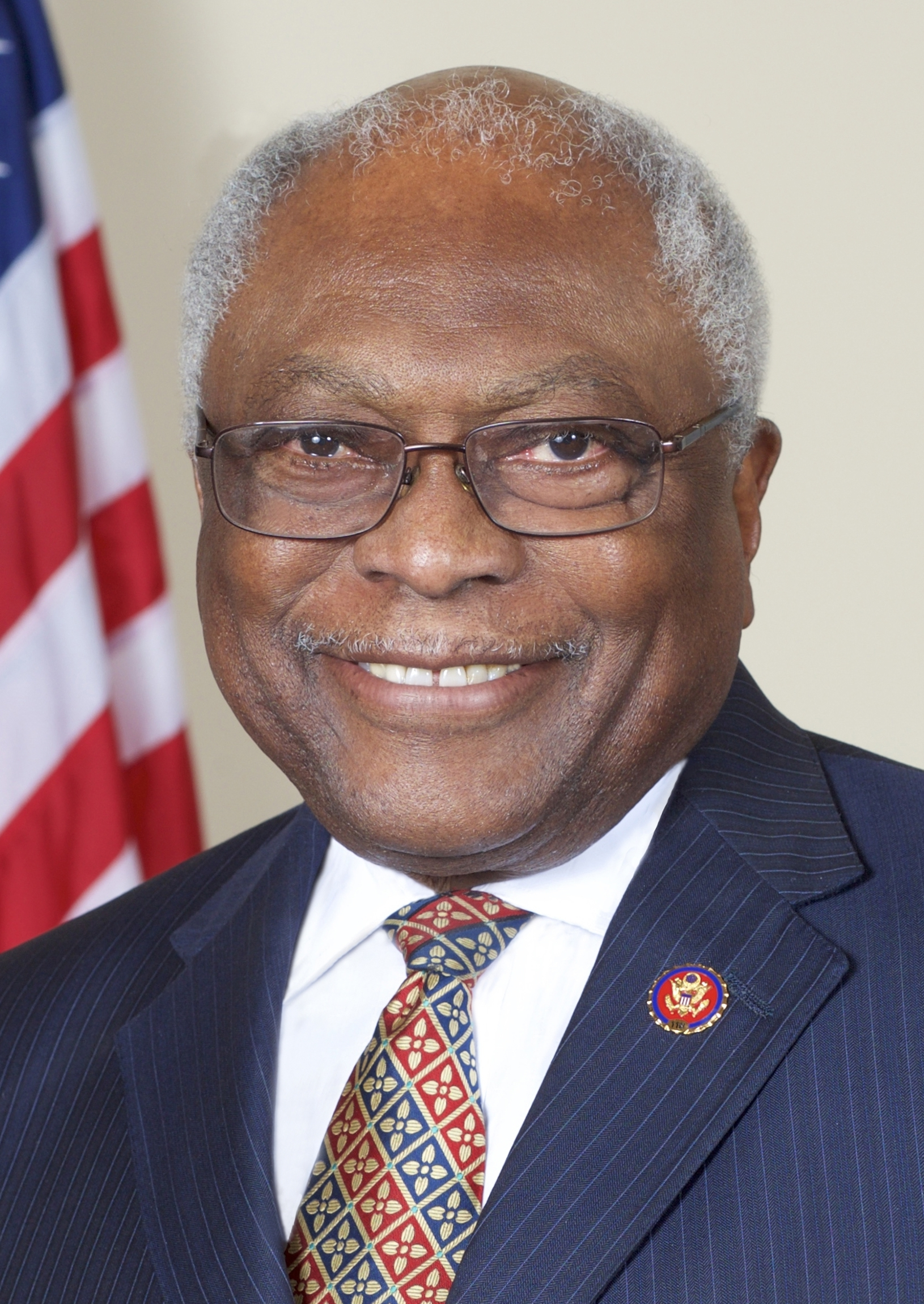

Nominee	Jim Clyburn	Gerhard Gressmann
Party	Democratic	Republican
Popular vote	144,765	58,282
Percentage	70.1%	28.2%
- County results Clyburn: 40–50% 50–60% 60–70% 70–80% 80–90%
U.S. Representative before election
Jim Clyburn
Democratic
Elected U.S. Representative
Jim Clyburn
Democratic

The 6th district is located in central and southern South Carolina. The incumbent was Democrat Jim Clyburn, who had represented the district since 1993. Clyburn was re-elected with 70% of the vote in 2016.

=== General election ===
==== Predictions ====
Source	Ranking	As of
The Cook Political Report	Safe D	November 5, 2018
Inside Elections	Safe D	November 5, 2018
Sabato's Crystal Ball	Safe D	November 5, 2018
RCP	Safe D	November 5, 2018
Daily Kos	Safe D	November 5, 2018
538	Safe D	November 7, 2018
CNN	Safe D	October 31, 2018
Politico	Safe D	November 4, 2018

==== Results ====
South Carolina's 6th congressional district, 2018
Party	Candidate	Votes	%
Democratic	Jim Clyburn (incumbent)	144,765	70.1
Republican	Gerhard Gressmann	58,282	28.2
Green	Bryan Pugh	3,214	1.6
n/a	Write-ins	172	0.1
Total votes		206,433	100.0
Democratic hold			

== District 7 ==
2018 South Carolina's 7th congressional district election
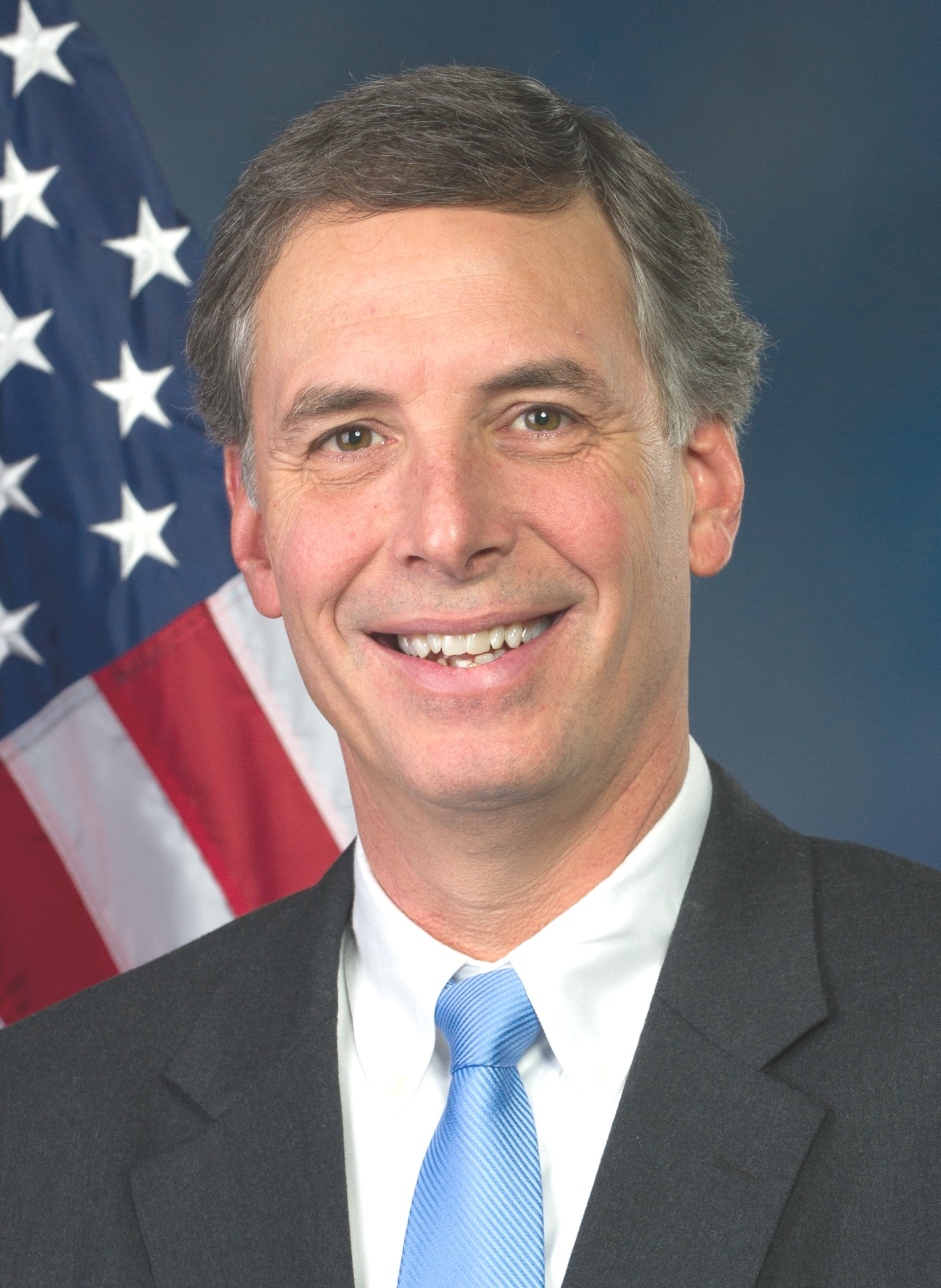

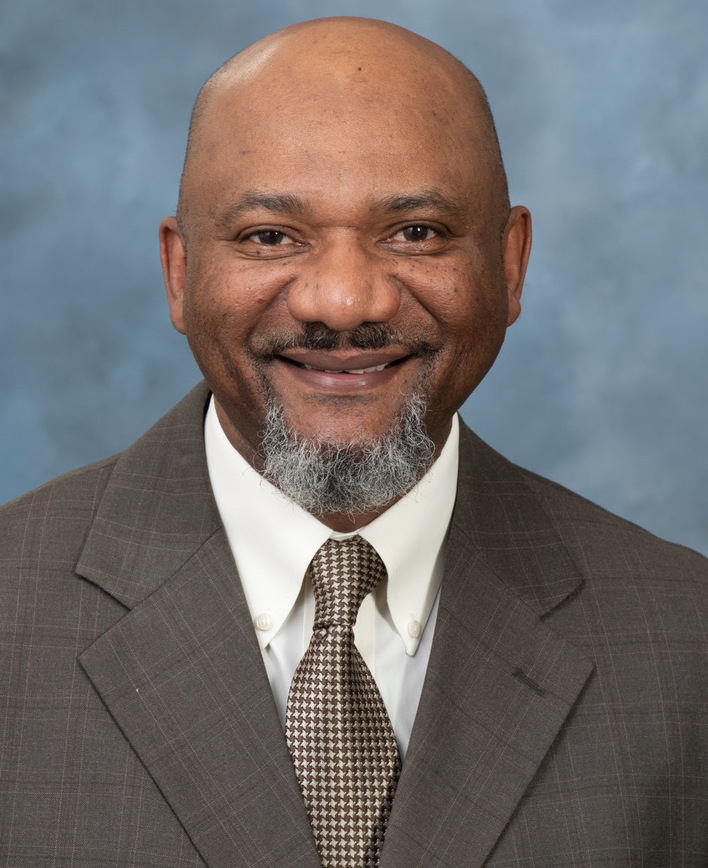
Nominee	Tom Rice	Robert Q. Williams
Party	Republican	Democratic
Popular vote	142,681	96,564
Percentage	59.6%	40.3%
- County results Rice: 50–60% 60–70% Williams: 50–60%
U.S. Representative before election
Tom Rice
Republican
Elected U.S. Representative
Tom Rice
Republican

The 7th district is located in northeastern South Carolina. The incumbent was Republican Tom Rice, who had represented the district since 2013. Rice was re-elected with 61% of the vote in 2016.

=== Democratic primary ===
==== Results ====
Democratic primary results
Party	Candidate	Votes	%
Democratic	Robert Q. Williams	14,087	41.3
Democratic	Mal Hyman	10,122	29.7
Democratic	Bill Hopkins	6,066	17.8
Democratic	Bruce Fischer	3,811	11.2
Total votes		34,086	100.0

==== Runoff results ====
Democratic primary runoff results
Party	Candidate	Votes	%
Democratic	Robert Q. Williams	7,702	51.40
Democratic	Mal Hyman	7,282	48.60
Total votes		14,984	100.0

=== Republican primary ===
==== Results ====
Republican primary results
Party	Candidate	Votes	%
Republican	Tom Rice (incumbent)	37,926	83.6
Republican	Larry Guy Hammond	7,438	16.4
Total votes		45,364	100.0

=== General election ===
==== Predictions ====
Source	Ranking	As of
The Cook Political Report	Safe R	November 5, 2018
Inside Elections	Safe R	November 5, 2018
Sabato's Crystal Ball	Safe R	November 5, 2018
RCP	Safe R	November 5, 2018
Daily Kos	Safe R	November 5, 2018
538	Safe R	November 7, 2018
CNN	Safe R	October 31, 2018
Politico	Safe R	November 4, 2018

==== Results ====
South Carolina's 7th congressional district, 2018
Party	Candidate	Votes	%
Republican	Tom Rice (incumbent)	142,681	59.6
Democratic	Robert Q. Williams	96,564	40.3
n/a	Write-ins	309	0.1
Total votes		239,554	100.0
Republican hold			
