= 2017 South Carolina's 5th congressional district special election =

- June 20, 2017

South Carolina's 5th congressional district
- Turnout: 18.34% ▼
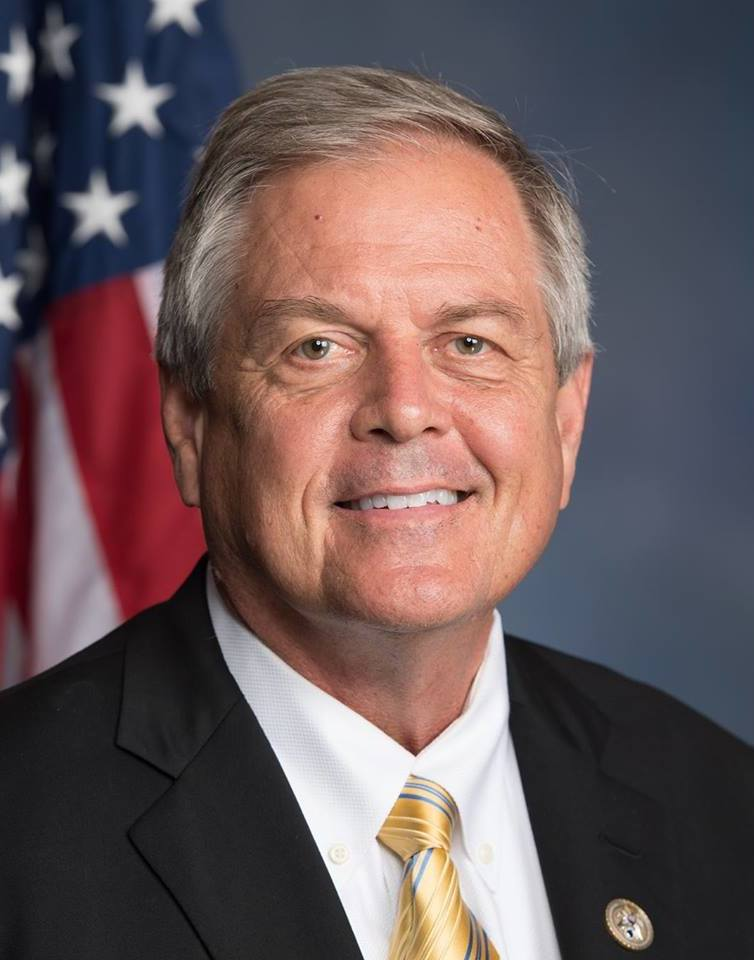

Nominee	Ralph Norman	Archie Parnell
Party	Republican	Democratic
Popular vote	45,076	42,341
Percentage	51.04%	47.94%
- Norman: 40–50% 50–60% 60–70% 70–80% 80–90% >90% Parnell: 50–60% 60–70% 70–80% 80–90% >90% Tie: 40–50% 50% No votes
U.S. Representative before election
Mick Mulvaney
Republican
Elected U.S. Representative
Ralph Norman
Republican

A special election was held on June 20, 2017, to determine the member of the United States House of Representatives for South Carolina's 5th congressional district. Representative Mick Mulvaney was nominated by President Donald Trump as director of the Office of Management and Budget and confirmed by the United States Senate on February 16, 2017, necessitating his resignation from the House of Representatives.

State Representative Ralph Norman narrowly defeated Archie Parnell, a senior advisor for Goldman Sachs, 51.0% to 47.9%, in a low-turnout election.

== Republican primary ==
=== Candidates ===
==== Declared ====
- Chad Connelly, former chairman of the South Carolina Republican Party
- Ray Craig, international ministry aid worker
- Sheri Few, education activist, candidate for Superintendent of Education in 2014 and state house candidate in 2006, 2008 and 2010
- Tom Mullikin, attorney and commander of the South Carolina State Guard
- Ralph Norman, state representative and nominee for this district in 2006
- Tommy Pope, state representative
- Kris Wampler, attorney

==== Declined ====
- Penry Gustafson, former businesswoman and community advocate of Camden, SC
- Gary Simrill, state representative

=== Endorsements ===
Tommy Pope
- Trey Gowdy, U.S. representative
Ralph Norman

Individuals

- Ted Cruz, senator from Texas
- Jim DeMint, former senator from South Carolina
- Nikki Haley, U.S. Ambassador to the United Nations
- Scott Walker, governor of Wisconsin
- Joe Wilson, U.S. representative

Organizations

- Club for Growth Action, conservative super PAC
Chad Connelly
- Jeff Duncan, U.S. representative
Tom Mullikin
- Al Simpson, chief of staff to former U.S. representative Mick Mulvaney

=== First round ===
==== Polling ====
Poll source	Date(s) administered	Sample size	Margin of error	Chad Connelly	Sheri Few	Tom Mullikin	Ralph Norman	Tommy Pope	Kris Wampler	Other	Undecided
Atlantic Research and Media of North Carolina*	February 25, 2017	239	± 6.2%	1%	9%	8%	11%	19%	0%	—	51%
Remington Research Group	January 7–8, 2017	778	± 3.4%	9%	—	—	9%	25%	—	6%	52%

*Internal survey for the Sheri Few campaign

==== Results ====
Results by county: Norman: 20–30%; 30–40%; Pope: 30–40%; 40–50%; Mullikin: 40–50%; 50–60%; Connelly: 60–70%

South Carolina's 5th congressional district special election Republican primary, 2017
Party	Candidate	Votes	%
Republican	Tommy Pope	11,943	30.4%
Republican	Ralph Norman	11,808	30.1%
Republican	Tom Mullikin	7,759	19.8%
Republican	Chad Connelly	5,546	14.1%
Republican	Sheri Few	1,930	4.9%
Republican	Kris Wampler	197	0.5%
Republican	Ray Craig	87	0.2%
Total votes		39,270	100.00%

=== Runoff ===
==== Polling ====
Poll source	Date(s) administered	Sample size	Margin of error	Ralph Norman	Tommy Pope	Undecided
Trafalgar Group	May 8–10, 2017	1000+	± 3.1%	46%	45%	9%

==== Results ====
Results by county: Norman: 50–60%; 60–70%; 70–80%; Pope: 50–60%

South Carolina's 5th congressional district special election Republican primary runoff, 2017
Party	Candidate	Votes	%
Republican	Ralph Norman	17,823	50.31%
Republican	Tommy Pope	17,602	49.69%
Total votes		35,425	100.00%

== Democratic primary ==
=== Candidates ===
==== Declared ====
- Alexis Frank, recent college graduate and Army veteran
- Les Murphy, United States Marine Corps veteran
- Archie Parnell, Goldman Sachs senior adviser

==== Declined ====
- John King, state representative
- Thomas McElveen, state senator
- Mandy Powers Norrell, state representative
- Fran Person, nominee for this seat in 2016
- Vincent Sheheen, state senator and nominee for governor in 2010 and 2014

=== Results ===
Results by county: Parnell: 50–60%; 60–70%; 70–80%; 80–90%

South Carolina's 5th congressional district special election Democratic primary, 2017
Party	Candidate	Votes	%
Democratic	Archie Parnell	13,333	71.3%
Democratic	Alexis Frank	4,030	21.5%
Democratic	Les Murphy	1,346	7.2%
Total votes		18,709	100.00%

== Libertarian Party ==
=== Candidates ===
==== Nominated ====
- Victor Kocher

==== Eliminated at convention ====
The Libertarian Party nominating convention was held on April 1, 2017.

- Bill Bledsoe
- Nathaniel Cooper

== Green Party ==
=== Candidates ===
==== Nominated ====
- David Kulma, professor at Winthrop University and musician

== General election ==
=== Candidates ===
- Victor Kocher (Libertarian)
- David Kulma (Green)
- Ralph Norman (Republican)
- Archie Parnell (Democratic)
- Josh Thornton (American)

=== Polling ===
Poll source	Date(s) administered	Sample size	Margin of error	Ralph Norman (R)	Archie Parnell (D)	Other	Undecided
Change Research	June 14–18, 2017	872	± 3%	53%	44%	3%	–
Gravis Marketing	May 19–22, 2017	746	± 3.6%	47%	34%	3%	16%
Victory Enterprises/Rampart PAC (R)	May 17–18, 2017	629	± 3.9%	53%	36%	–	11%

=== Results ===
South Carolina's 5th congressional district special election, 2017
Party	Candidate	Votes	%	±%
Republican	Ralph Norman	45,076	51.04%	−8.03%
Democratic	Archie Parnell	42,341	47.94%	+9.17%
American	Josh Thornton	319	0.36%	−1.74%
Libertarian	Victor Kocher	273	0.31%	N/A
Green	David Kulma	242	0.27%	N/A
Write-In	Write-in	65	0.07%	+0.31%
Total votes		88,316	100.0%	
Republican hold				

=== County results ===
Vote breakdown by county
	Ralph Norman Republican		Archie Parnell Democrat		Total
County	Votes	%	Votes	%	Votes
Cherokee	3,367	61.86%	2,031	37.31%	5,443
Chester	1,940	45.20%	2,301	53.61%	4,292
Fairfield	1,125	32.33%	2,314	66.49%	3,480
Kershaw	3,720	52.53%	3,299	46.59%	7,081
Lancaster	6,237	55.07%	4,985	44.02%	11,325
Lee	632	25.54%	1,825	73.74%	2,475
Newberry	1,627	51.07%	1,519	47.68%	3,186
Spartanburg	763	70.98%	302	28.09%	1,075
Sumter	3,757	39.64%	5,671	59.84%	9,477
Union	1,436	50.35%	1,397	48.98%	2,852
York	20,472	54.44%	16,697	44.33%	37,630

== See also ==
- List of special elections to the United States House of Representatives
