= Kirsh =

Kirsh is a surname. Notable people with the surname include:

- David Kirsh (born 1950), Canadian cognitive scientist
- Herb Kirsh (1929–2014), American politician
- Nathan Kirsh (born 1932), South African-born business magnate

== See also ==
- Kirsch
