= Archie Parnell =

American politician

- Born: Archie William Parnell Jr. 1950 or 1951 (age 75–76)
- Education: University of South Carolina (BA, JD); Georgetown University (LLM)
- Occupation: Tax attorney
- Employer(s): Justice Department (1974–1976); House Ways and Means Committee staff (1976–1980); ExxonMobil (1980–1990); Coudert Brothers (1990–1996); Goldman Sachs (1996–2016)
- Political party: Democratic
- Website: archieparnell4congress.com

Archie William Parnell Jr. is an American attorney and politician. He was the Democratic Party's nominee for the June 20, 2017, special election for South Carolina's 5th congressional district of the United States House of Representatives. He narrowly lost the election to Republican Ralph Norman, receiving 47.9 percent of the vote in the general election, an unexpectedly close margin. Parnell challenged Norman again in the 2018 election to lose again having earned 41.5 percent of the vote.

== Early life and education ==
Parnell grew up mostly in Sumter, South Carolina, where he currently resides. His family also lived in several places including the U.K., Germany, and Florida, where his father Archie Parnell Sr. was stationed with U.S. Air Force. Parnell Jr. attended Willow Drive School through sixth grade and, after his family returned to Sumter, graduated from Sumter High School. He then attended the University of South Carolina, where he earned a B.A. degree and a J.D. degree. He later earned a LL.M. degree from Georgetown University.

== Early career ==
Parnell worked as a tax attorney for the U.S. Department of Justice and for the House Ways and Means Committee. While serving as senior staff counsel for the committee, he also wrote articles that were published in the Catholic University Law Review and the Yale Law Journal.

Parnell later worked as a tax attorney for ExxonMobil for ten years. From 1996 to 2016, he worked for Goldman Sachs and was a managing director for the company’s Hong Kong office. He retired from the position before declaring his intention to run for U.S. Congress.

== Political campaigns ==
=== 2017 election campaign ===
In March 2017, Parnell announced his candidacy for the position formerly held by Representative Mick Mulvaney of South Carolina, who resigned from his congressional seat to become budget director on Trump administration. Parnell was new to politics but was the first Democrat to announce his candidacy for the 5th District seat. By the time he entered the race, seven Republicans had also announced their candidacy for the district that is increasingly leaning towards the conservative party and a Republican was first elected in 2011 when a Democrat, John Spratt, who had held the seat for a long time lost to Mulvaney.

Two other Democratic candidates also entered the race: Alexis Frank and Les Murphy. Spratt endorsed Parnell in the Democratic primary held on May 2, 2017. He also gained the endorsement of other Democrats in the state including Jim Hodges, formerly the Governor of South Carolina. Parnell won the primary with 71.3% of the vote to become the democratic nominee.

A number of television advertisements of Parnell's drew national media notice. In it, he imitated the fictional character Frank Underwood, who represents what appears to be the South Carolina 5th district in the television show House of Cards. Although Parnell's own internal polls predicted that he was 10 percentage points behind his Republican opponent, Ralph Norman, Parnell lost the June 20 election by a small margin, earning 47.9% percent of the votes to Norman's 51.1%. Fewer than 3,000 votes separated the two candidates. A Politico analysis attributed Parnell's relatively high vote percentage, given the district and the special election timing, to his humble, positive, and funny ad messages, and his avoidance of standard partisan conflicts and rhetoric. Parnell spent approximately $500,000 on his campaign through the end of May 2017. In addition to his unique advertising and campaign strategy, his close margin has been attributed, in part, to low Republican turnout.

=== 2018 election campaign ===
On October 9, 2017, Parnell announced that he would challenge Norman for a full term in the regular 2018 election. He again released a humorous campaign ad that gained national attention. In the ad, he was depicted getting a tattoo, receiving a haircut at a local barbershop, and playing Go Fish with Congressman Jim Clyburn. In January 2018, Democratic Congressional Campaign Committee added the election in the 5th district to its "Majority Maker district" list which the political party was targeting with the hope of gaining towards a majority in the 116th United States Congress.

On May 21, 2018, an article in Charleston's Post and Courier revealed the discovery of court documents from Parnell's previously undisclosed 1973 divorce. Parnell's wife was granted a restraining order and a divorce "on the ground of physical cruelty." No charges were filed. Parnell did not challenge the statements at the time or after their 2018 discovery. After the news story broke, some of Parnell's campaign staff quit, and South Carolina Democratic Party officials called on Parnell to withdraw from the race.

Parnell chose to remain in the race. On June 12, 2018, he won a four-way Democratic primary with approximately 60% of the vote. He lost to Norman in the general election, taking 41.5 percent of the votes to his opponent's 57.1 percent.

== Academic career ==
Parnell was an adjunct faculty member of the University of South Carolina School of Law. In 2018, he taught a course in "International Business Structures" at the law school.

In 2020, Parnell joined the faculty of the O. P. Jindal Global University in Sonipat, India. He became a visiting professor of law at the Jindal Global Law School, co-teaching a course entitled "A Tale of Two Tax Systems: Discerning Solutions for India–US Tax Disputes".
