= Tommy Pope (politician) =

American politician (born 1962)

Speaker pro tempore of the South Carolina House of Representatives
- Incumbent
- Assumed office December 2, 2014
- Preceded by: Jay Lucas

Member of the South Carolina House of Representatives from the 47th district
- Incumbent
- Assumed office November 8, 2010
- Preceded by: Herb Kirsh

Personal details
- Born: July 24, 1962 (age 64) Rock Hill, South Carolina, U.S.
- Party: Republican
- Spouse: Kimberly Greenwood (m. 1994)
- Education: University of South Carolina (BS, JD)

Thomas E. Pope (born July 24, 1962) is an American politician. He is a Republican.

== Early life and education ==
Pope was born on July 24, 1962 in Rock Hill, South Carolina. He attended the South Carolina Criminal Justice Academy in 1983, and received a B.S. in 1984 and a J.D. in 1987 from the University of South Carolina.

== Career ==
Pope previously served as solicitor (equivalent to a district attorney) of the 16th Judicial Circuit in South Carolina, representing the people of Union and York counties from 1993 to 2006.

Pope prosecuted Susan Smith in 1995 for the drowning death of her two children. He testified at her November 2024 and 2026 parole hearings, urging that she be denied parole.

He is currently a managing partner of Elrod Pope Law Firm in Rock Hill, South Carolina.

== Political career ==
=== South Carolina House ===
Pope currently serves as speaker pro tempore within the South Carolina House of Representatives and since 2010 has served as a South Carolina House Member from the 47th District.

In 2024 he was re-elected by acclamation as speaker pro tempore.

=== 2017 South Carolina 5th congressional district special election ===
On February 6, 2017, Pope announced his intention to seek South Carolina's 5th congressional district seat in the upcoming special election, due to the resignation of Mick Mulvaney to become the Director of the Office of Management and Budget.

On May 2, 2017, Pope narrowly won the Republican primary for the U.S. congressional seat, leading by only 0.3%. On May 16, 2017, Pope lost the runoff against Ralph Norman by 200 votes, or 0.6%.

== Electoral history ==
2016 South Carolina House of Representatives District 47 election
Party	Candidate	Votes	%
Republican	Tommy Pope	13,579	83.3%
Constitution	Diane Phelps Simmons	2,659	16.3%
Write-in		59	0.36%
Total votes		16,297	100.0%

2018 South Carolina House of Representatives District 47 election
Party	Candidate	Votes	%
Republican	Tommy Pope	10,894	71.6%
Democratic	Marty R. Cotton	4,315	28.3%
Write-in		12	0.08%
Total votes		15,221	100.0%

2020 South Carolina House of Representatives District 47 election
Party	Candidate	Votes	%
Republican	Tommy Pope	17,569	73.3%
Democratic	Ryan McKenzie Arioli	6,355	26.5%
Write-in		29	0.12%
Total votes		23,953	100.0%

2022 South Carolina House of Representatives District 47 election
Party	Candidate	Votes	%
Republican	Tommy Pope	12,501	98.5%
Write-in		185	1.5%
Total votes		12,686	100.0%

2024 South Carolina House of Representatives District 47 election
Party	Candidate	Votes	%
Republican	Tommy Pope	19,625	98.8%
Write-in		236	1.2%
Total votes		19,861	100.0%

South Carolina House of Representatives
Preceded by Jay Lucas	Speaker pro tempore of the South Carolina House of Representatives; 2014–present	Incumbent
