= Congressional Solar Caucus =

Caucus in the US House of Representatives

The Congressional Solar Caucus is a bipartisan United States House of Representatives caucus whose members "work on a bipartisan basis to find common ground to tackle issues facing solar business and communities". The caucus was started in February 2018, during the 115th Congress, by Representatives Raja Krishnamoorthi (D-IL) and Ralph Norman (R-SC).

== Mission ==
The mission of the Caucus is:

"to raise awareness for how policymakers, business leaders, and academic experts can work together to foster jobs, growth, and America’s leadership in the solar industry."

== Members ==
=== 118th Congress ===
Congressional Solar Caucus in the 118th United States Congress

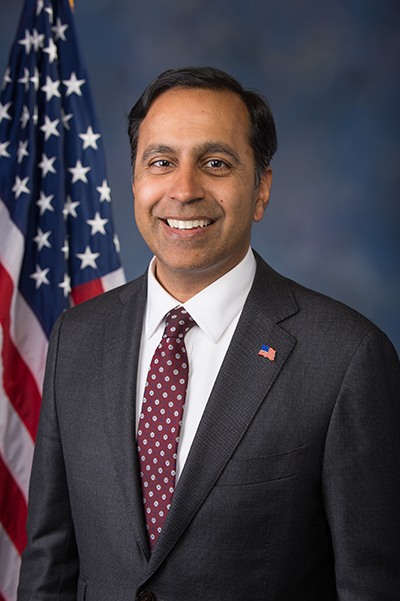
Co-chair Raja Krishnamoorthi

In the 118th Congress, members were as follows:

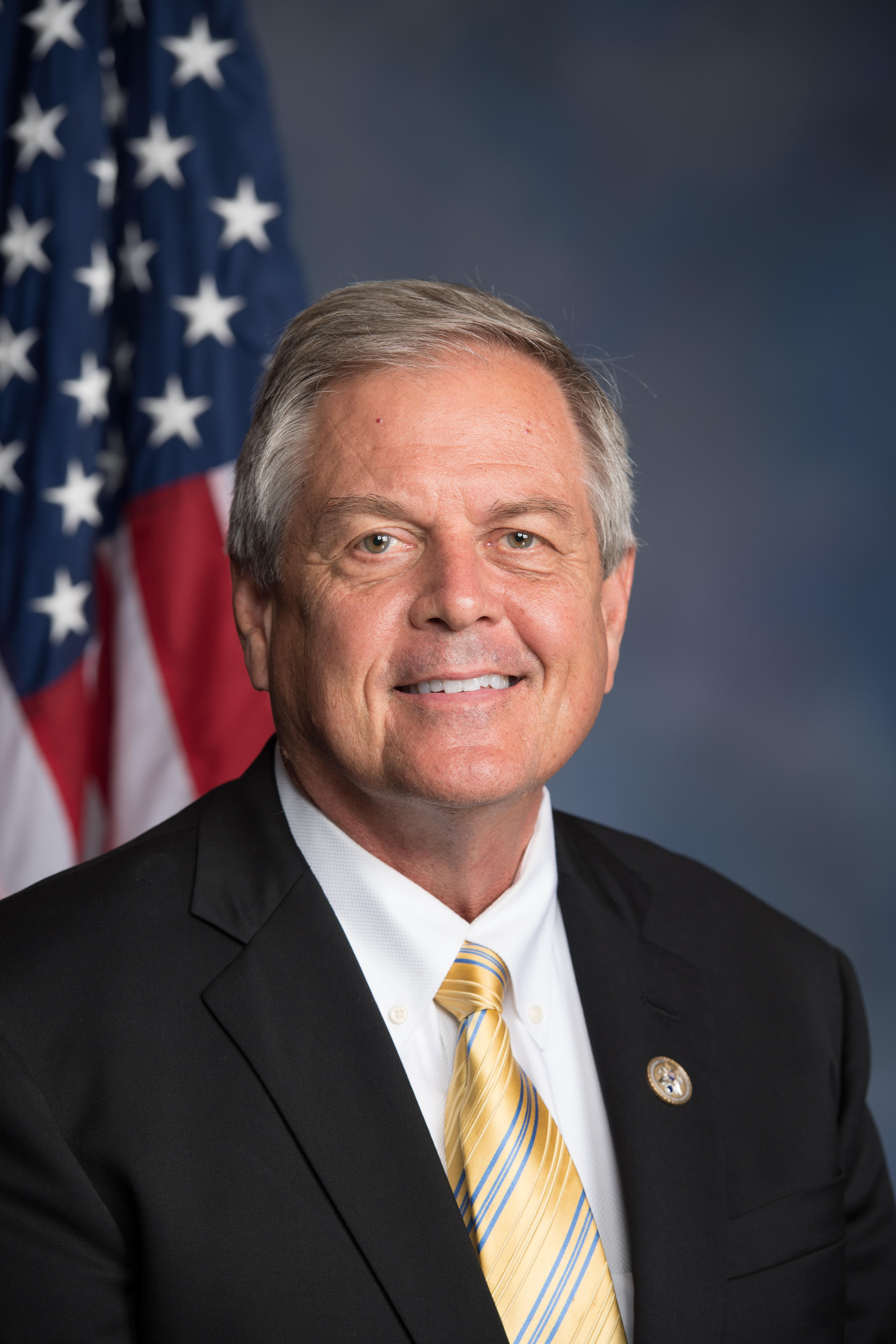
Co-chair Ralph Norman

Name	Party	District
Rep. Raja Krishnamoorthi (co-chair)	Democratic	Illinois 8th
Rep. Ralph Norman (co-chair)	Republican	South Carolina 5th
Rep. Brendan Boyle	Democratic	Pennsylvania 2nd
Rep. Julia Brownley	Democratic	California 26th
Rep. Salud Carbajal	Democratic	California 24th
Rep. John Curtis	Republican	Utah 3rd
Rep. Sharice Davids	Democratic	Kansas 3rd
Rep. Debbie Dingell	Democratic	Michigan 6th
Rep. Jeff Duncan	Republican	South Carolina 3rd
Rep. Brian Fitzpatrick	Republican	Pennsylvania 1st
Rep. Paul Gosar	Republican	Arizona 4th
Rep. Eleanor Holmes Norton	Democratic	District of Columbia
Rep. Joe Neguse	Democratic	Colorado 2nd
Rep. Donald Norcross	Democratic	New Jersey 1st
Rep. Matt Cartwright	Democratic	Pennsylvania 8th
Rep. Gerald Connolly	Democratic	Virginia 11th
Rep. Debbie Wasserman Schultz	Democratic	Florida 23rd
Rep. Jamie Raskin	Democratic	Maryland 8th
Rep. Raul Ruiz	Democratic	California 25th
Rep. Darren Soto	Democratic	Florida 9th
Rep. Paul Tonko	Democratic	New York 20th
Rep. Marc Veasey	Democratic	Texas 33rd
Rep. Rick Larsen	Democratic	Washington 2nd
Rep. Zoe Lofgren	Democratic	California 18th

Last updated November 15, 2024

== See also ==
- Photovoltaics
- Solar power in the United States
- Caucuses of the United States Congress
- United States House of Representatives
