= 2016 United States House of Representatives elections in South Carolina =

- November 8, 2016

All 7 South Carolina seats to the United States House of Representatives
	Majority party	Minority party
Party	Republican	Democratic
Last election	6	1
Seats won	6	1
Seat change	Steady	Steady
Popular vote	1,193,711	800,801
Percentage	58.53%	39.27%
Swing	▼5.02%	▲6.20%

Republican
40–50%
50–60%
60–70%
70–80%
80–90%
Democratic
40–50%
50–60%
60–70%
70–80%
Winners
Republican hold
Democratic hold

The 2016 United States House of Representatives elections in South Carolina were held on November 8, 2016, to elect the seven U.S. representatives from the state of South Carolina, one from each of the state's seven congressional districts. The elections coincided with the 2016 U.S. presidential election, as well as other elections to the House of Representatives, elections to the United States Senate, and various state and local elections. The primaries were held on June 14.

== Overview ==
District	Republican		Democratic		Others		Total		Result
District	Votes	%	Votes	%	Votes	%	Votes	%	Result
District 1	190,410	58.56%	119,779	36.84%	14,981	4.61%	325,170	100.0%	Republican hold
District 2	183,746	60.25%	109,452	35.89%	11,798	3.87%	304,996	100.0%	Republican hold
District 3	198,431	72.82%	73,766	27.07%	284	0.10%	272,481	100.0%	Republican hold
District 4	198,648	67.19%	91,676	31.01%	5,346	1.81%	295,670	100.0%	Republican hold
District 5	175,909	59.07%	115,437	38.77%	6,435	2.16%	297,781	100.0%	Republican hold
District 6	70,099	27.61%	177,947	70.09%	5,855	2.31%	253,901	100.0%	Democratic hold
District 7	176,468	60.96%	112,744	38.95%	251	0.09%	289,463	100.0%	Republican hold
Total	1,193,711	58.53%	800,801	39.27%	44,950	2.20%	2,039,462	100.0%	

Popular vote
Republican	58.53%
Democratic	39.27%
Other	2.20%

House seats
Republican	85.71%
Democratic	14.29%

== District 1 ==
2016 South Carolina's 1st congressional district election
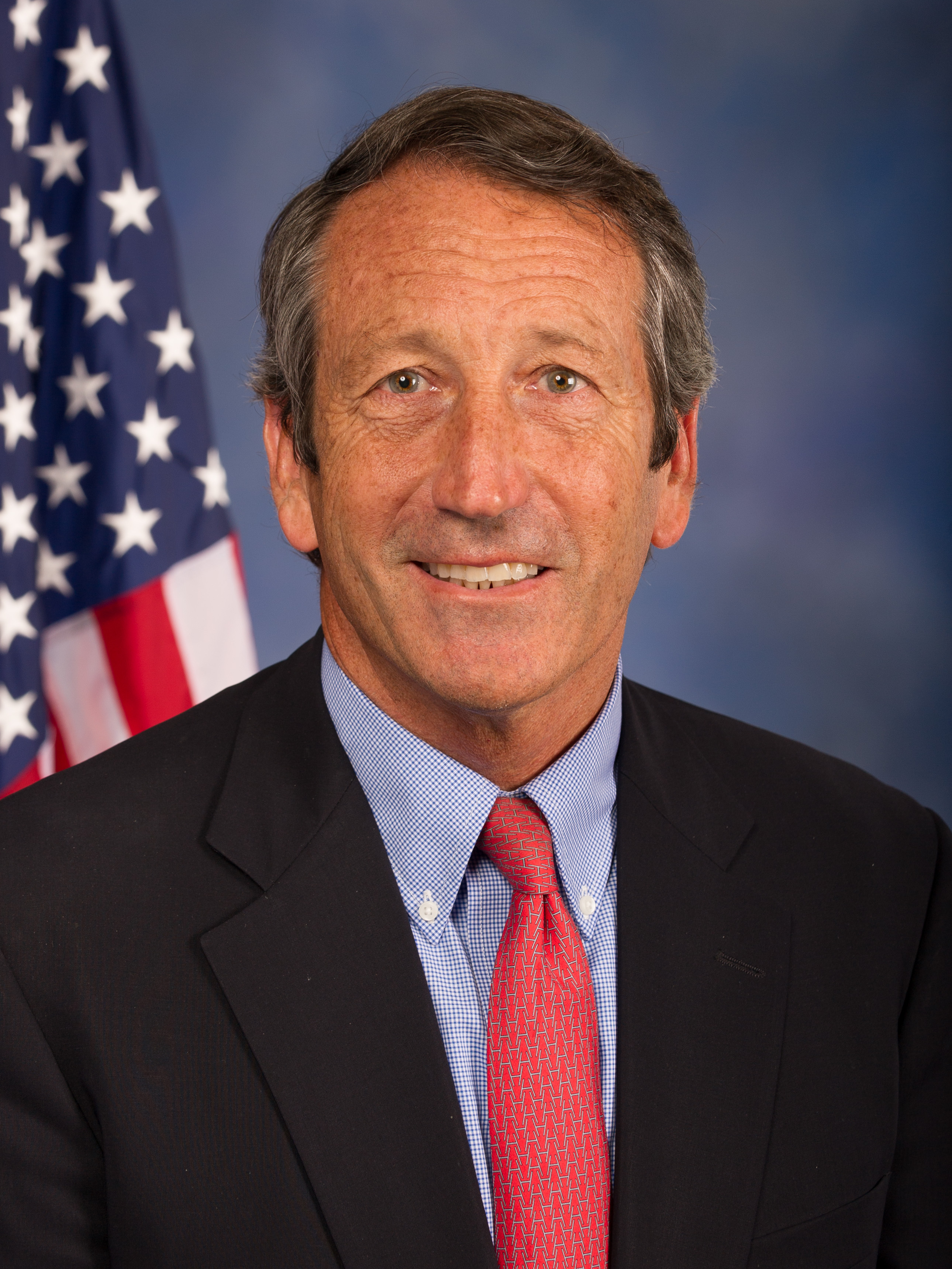

Nominee	Mark Sanford	Dimitri Cherny
Party	Republican	Democratic
Popular vote	190,410	119,779
Percentage	58.6%	36.8%
- Sanford: 50–60% 60–70% 70–80% 80–90% Cherry: 50–60% 60–70% 70–80% 80–90% >90% Tie: 50%
U.S. Representative before election
Mark Sanford
Republican
Elected U.S. Representative
Mark Sanford
Republican

The 1st district is located on the Atlantic coastal plain, from Seabrook Island to the border with North Carolina and includes most of Charleston and Myrtle Beach. The incumbent was Republican Mark Sanford, who had represented the district since 2013, and previously from 1995 to 2001. The district had a PVI of R+11.

=== Republican primary ===
==== Candidates ====
===== Nominee =====
- Mark Sanford, incumbent U.S. representative

===== Eliminated in primary =====
- Jenny Horne, state representative

==== Campaign ====
During the campaign, Sanford had a significant fundraising advantage over Horne. During their sole debate, the two expressed contrasting views on Donald Trump. Sanford said, "I think he says some things which are very, very strange. Some of which are destructive." Horne said, "I think what Donald Trump is appealing to is the anger and frustration that a lot of us feel in the U.S..."

==== Results ====
Horne polled stronger than expected, with Sanford receiving 56% of the vote to Horne's 44%.

Republican primary results
Party	Candidate	Votes	%
Republican	Mark Sanford (incumbent)	21,299	55.6
Republican	Jenny Horne	17,001	44.4
Total votes		38,300	100.0

=== Democratic primary ===
==== Candidates ====
===== Nominee =====
- Dimitri Cherny, truck driver, former high-tech product manager and activist

He also received the Working Families and Green Party nominations.

=== General election ===
==== Predictions ====
Source	Ranking	As of
The Cook Political Report	Safe R	November 7, 2016
Daily Kos Elections	Safe R	November 7, 2016
Rothenberg	Safe R	November 3, 2016
Sabato's Crystal Ball	Safe R	November 7, 2016
RCP	Safe R	October 31, 2016

==== Results ====
South Carolina's 1st congressional district, 2016
Party	Candidate	Votes	%
Republican	Mark Sanford (incumbent)	190,410	58.6
Democratic	Dimitri Cherny	119,779	36.8
Libertarian	Michael Grier Jr.	11,614	3.6
American	Albert Travison	2,774	0.8
Write-in		593	0.2
Total votes		325,170	100.0
Republican hold			

== District 2 ==
2016 South Carolina's 2nd congressional district election
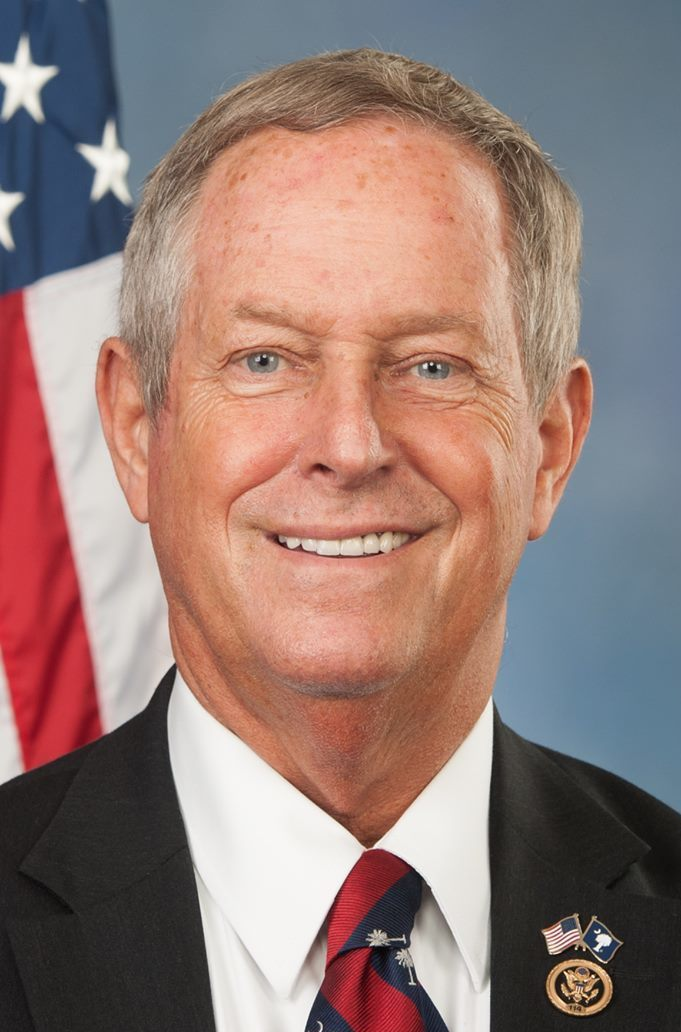

Nominee	Joe Wilson	Arik Bjorn
Party	Republican	Democratic
Popular vote	183,746	109,452
Percentage	60.2%	35.9%
- Wilson: 40–50% 50–60% 60–70% 70–80% 80–90% Bjorn: 40–50% 50–60% 60–70% 70–80% 80–90% >90% Tie: 50% No data
U.S. Representative before election
Joe Wilson
Republican
Elected U.S. Representative
Joe Wilson
Republican

The 2nd district is located in central South Carolina and spans from Columbia to the South Carolina side of the Augusta, Georgia metropolitan area. The incumbent was Republican Joe Wilson, who had represented the district since 2001. The Democratic and Green Party nominee was Arik Bjorn. The district had a PVI of R+16.

=== Republican primary ===
==== Candidates ====
===== Nominee =====
- Joe Wilson, incumbent U.S. representative

=== Democratic primary ===
==== Candidates ====
===== Nominee =====
- Arik Bjorn, former manager of South Carolina's SmartState program

===== Eliminated in primary =====
- Phil Black, businessman and Republican candidate for this seat in 2008, 2010 & 2012 and nominee for this seat in 2014

==== Results ====
Democratic primary results
Party	Candidate	Votes	%
Democratic	Arik Bjorn	9,686	50.1
Democratic	Phil Black	9,642	49.9
Total votes		19,328	100.0

=== General election ===
==== Predictions ====
Source	Ranking	As of
The Cook Political Report	Safe R	November 7, 2016
Daily Kos Elections	Safe R	November 7, 2016
Rothenberg	Safe R	November 3, 2016
Sabato's Crystal Ball	Safe R	November 7, 2016
RCP	Safe R	October 31, 2016

==== Results ====
South Carolina's 2nd congressional district, 2016
Party	Candidate	Votes	%
Republican	Joe Wilson (incumbent)	183,746	60.2
Democratic	Arik Bjorn	109,452	35.9
American	Eddie McCain	11,444	3.8
Write-in		354	0.1
Total votes		304,996	100.0
Republican hold			

== District 3 ==
2016 South Carolina's 3rd congressional district election
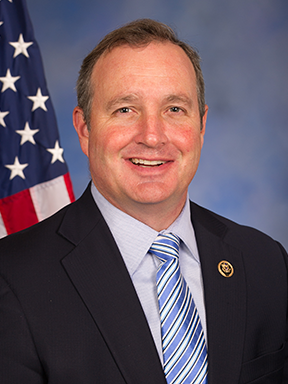

Nominee	Jeff Duncan	Hosea Cleveland
Party	Republican	Democratic
Popular vote	198,431	73,766
Percentage	72.8%	27.1%
- Duncan: 50–60% 60–70% 70–80% 80–90% >90% Bjorn: 50–60% 60–70% 70–80% 80–90% >90%
U.S. Representative before election
Jeff Duncan
Republican
Elected U.S. Representative
Jeff Duncan
Republican

The 3rd district is located in western South Carolina. The incumbent was Republican Jeff Duncan, who had represented the district since 2011. The district had a PVI of R+18.

=== Republican primary ===
==== Candidates ====
===== Nominee =====
- Jeff Duncan, incumbent U.S. representative

=== Democratic primary ===
==== Candidates ====
===== Nominee =====
- Hosea Cleveland, small business owner and candidate for this seat in 2014

=== General election ===
==== Predictions ====
Source	Ranking	As of
The Cook Political Report	Safe R	November 7, 2016
Daily Kos Elections	Safe R	November 7, 2016
Rothenberg	Safe R	November 3, 2016
Sabato's Crystal Ball	Safe R	November 7, 2016
RCP	Safe R	October 31, 2016

==== Results ====
South Carolina's 3rd congressional district, 2016
Party	Candidate	Votes	%
Republican	Jeff Duncan (incumbent)	198,431	72.8
Democratic	Hosea Cleveland	73,766	27.1
Write-in		284	0.1
Total votes		272,481	100.0
Republican hold			

== District 4 ==
2016 South Carolina's 4th congressional district election
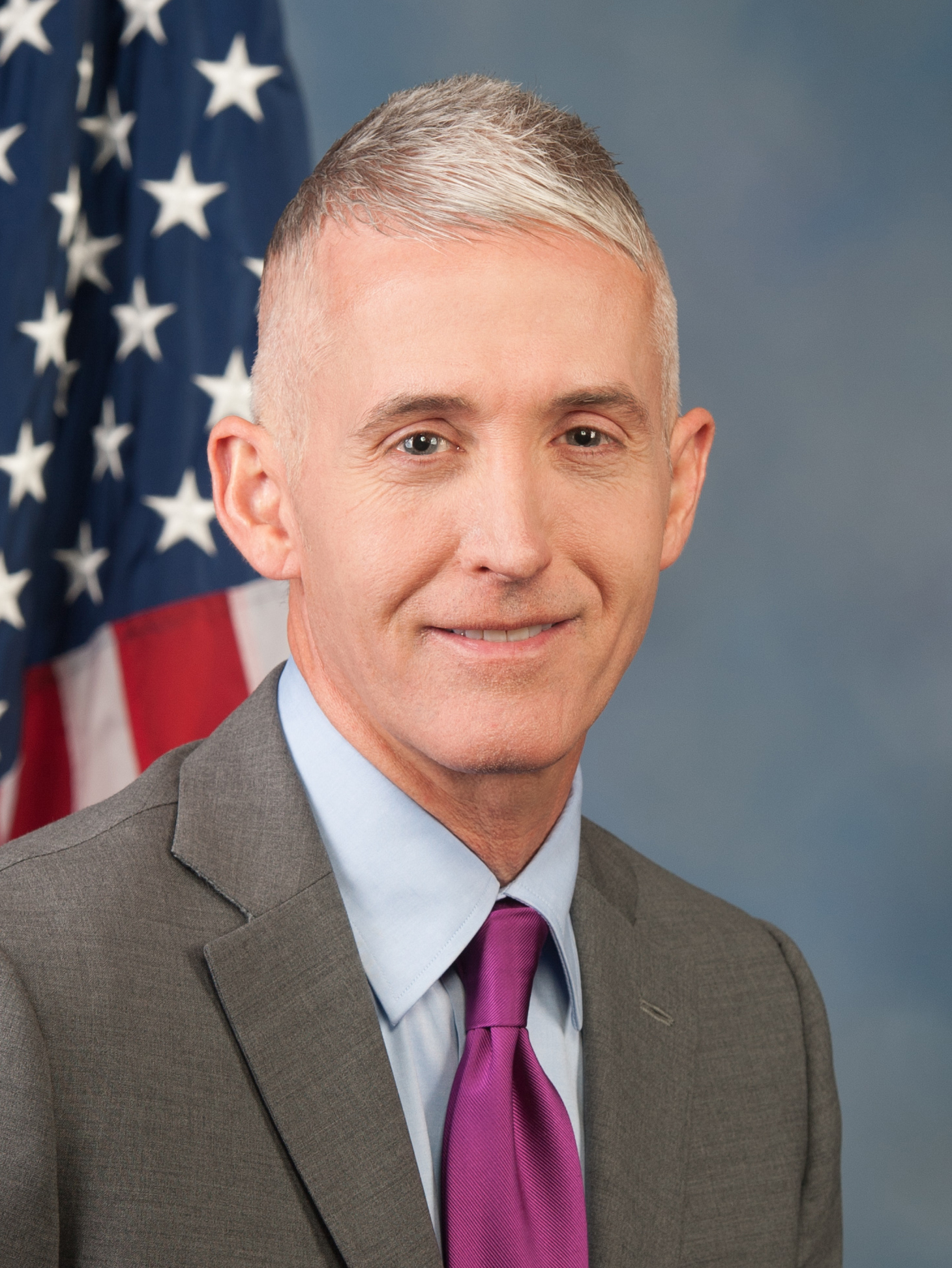

Nominee	Trey Gowdy	Chris Fedalei
Party	Republican	Democratic
Popular vote	198,648	91,676
Percentage	67.2%	31.0%
- Gowdy: 40–50% 50–60% 60–70% 70–80% 80–90% >90% Fedali: 40–50% 50–60% 60–70% 70–80% 80–90% >90%
U.S. Representative before election
Trey Gowdy
Republican
Elected U.S. Representative
Trey Gowdy
Republican

The 4th district is located in Upstate South Carolina. The incumbent was Republican Trey Gowdy, who had represented the district since 2011. The district had a PVI of R+15.

=== Republican primary ===
After Gowdy declined to run for House majority leader following the announcement of the resignation of Speaker of the House John Boehner, in 2015, John Fleming, a Republican congressman from Louisiana, told reporters that Gowdy would not run for reelection in 2016. Gowdy's office denied the report, and said that he had "every intention" of running in 2016.

==== Candidates ====
===== Nominee =====
- Trey Gowdy, incumbent U.S. representative

=== Democratic primary ===
==== Candidates ====
===== Nominee =====
- Chris Fedalei, attorney

=== General election ===
In the November general election, Gowdy faced Democrat Chris Fedalei, a 26-year-old attorney who had never held elected office.

==== Debates ====
- Complete video of debate, October 24, 2016

==== Predictions ====
Source	Ranking	As of
The Cook Political Report	Safe R	November 7, 2016
Daily Kos Elections	Safe R	November 7, 2016
Rothenberg	Safe R	November 3, 2016
Sabato's Crystal Ball	Safe R	November 7, 2016
RCP	Safe R	October 31, 2016

==== Results ====
South Carolina's 4th congressional district, 2016
Party	Candidate	Votes	%
Republican	Trey Gowdy (incumbent)	198,648	67.2
Democratic	Chris Fedalei	91,676	31.0
Constitution	Michael Chandler	5,103	1.7
Write-in		243	0.1
Total votes		295,670	100.0
Republican hold			

== District 5 ==
2016 South Carolina's 5th congressional district election
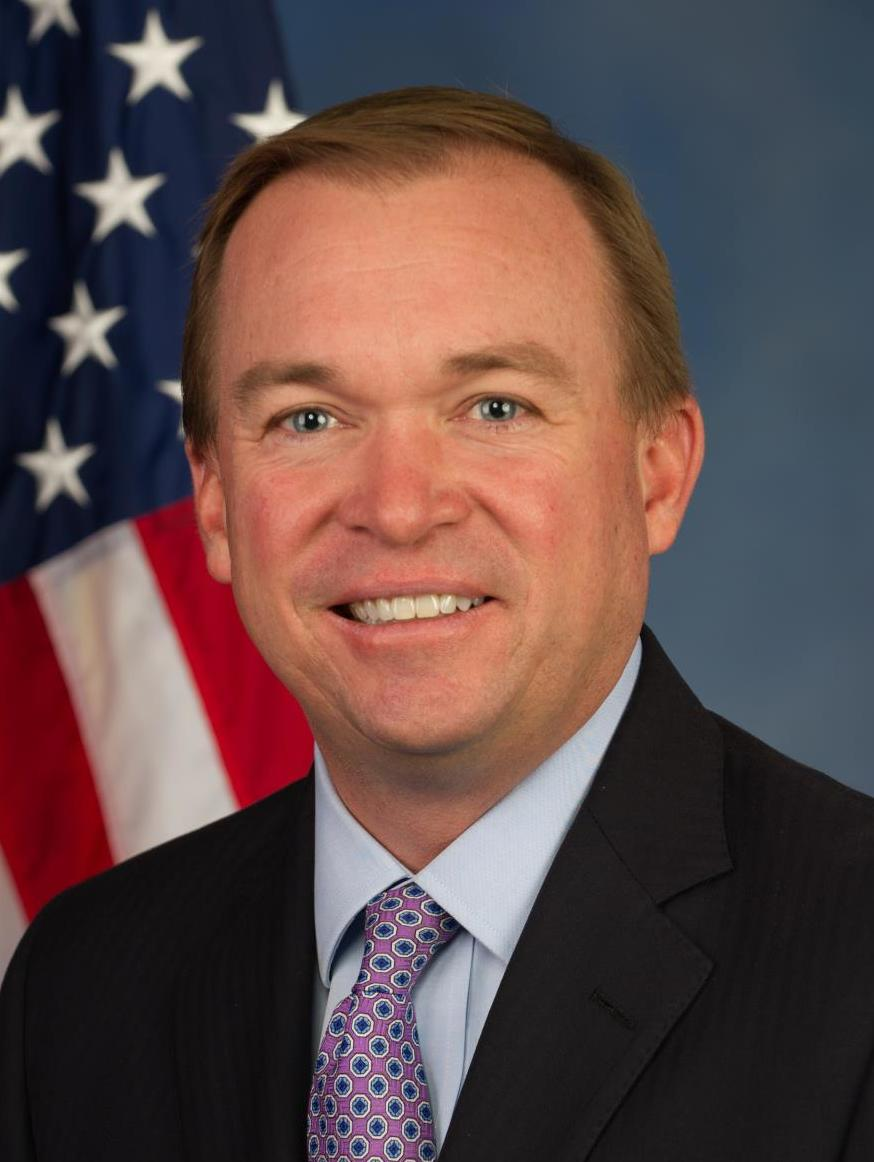

Nominee	Mick Mulvaney	Fran Person
Party	Republican	Democratic
Popular vote	175,909	115,437
Percentage	59.1%	38.8%
- Mulvaney: 40–50% 50–60% 60–70% 70–80% 80–90% >90% Person: 40–50% 50–60% 60–70% 70–80% 80–90% >90%
U.S. Representative before election
Mick Mulvaney
Republican
Elected U.S. Representative
Mick Mulvaney
Republican

The 5th district is located in northern South Carolina. The incumbent was Republican Mick Mulvaney, who had represented the district since 2011. The district had a PVI of R+9.

=== Republican primary ===
==== Candidates ====
===== Nominee =====
- Mick Mulvaney, incumbent U.S. representative

===== Eliminated in primary =====
- Ray Craig, international ministry aid worker

==== Results ====
Republican primary results
Party	Candidate	Votes	%
Republican	Mick Mulvaney (incumbent)	22,603	78.3
Republican	Ray Craig	6,280	21.7
Total votes		28,883	100.0

=== Democratic primary ===
==== Candidates ====
===== Nominee =====
- Fran Person, former aide to Joe Biden and former University of South Carolina football player

===== Withdrawn =====
- John King, state representative

=== General election ===
==== Predictions ====
Source	Ranking	As of
The Cook Political Report	Safe R	November 7, 2016
Daily Kos Elections	Safe R	November 7, 2016
Rothenberg	Safe R	November 3, 2016
Sabato's Crystal Ball	Safe R	November 7, 2016
RCP	Safe R	October 31, 2016

==== Results ====
South Carolina's 5th congressional district, 2016
Party	Candidate	Votes	%
Republican	Mick Mulvaney (incumbent)	175,909	59.1
Democratic	Fran Person	115,437	38.8
American	Rudy Barnes Jr	6,239	2.1
Write-in		196	0.1
Total votes		297,781	100.0
Republican hold			

== District 6 ==
2016 South Carolina's 6th congressional district election
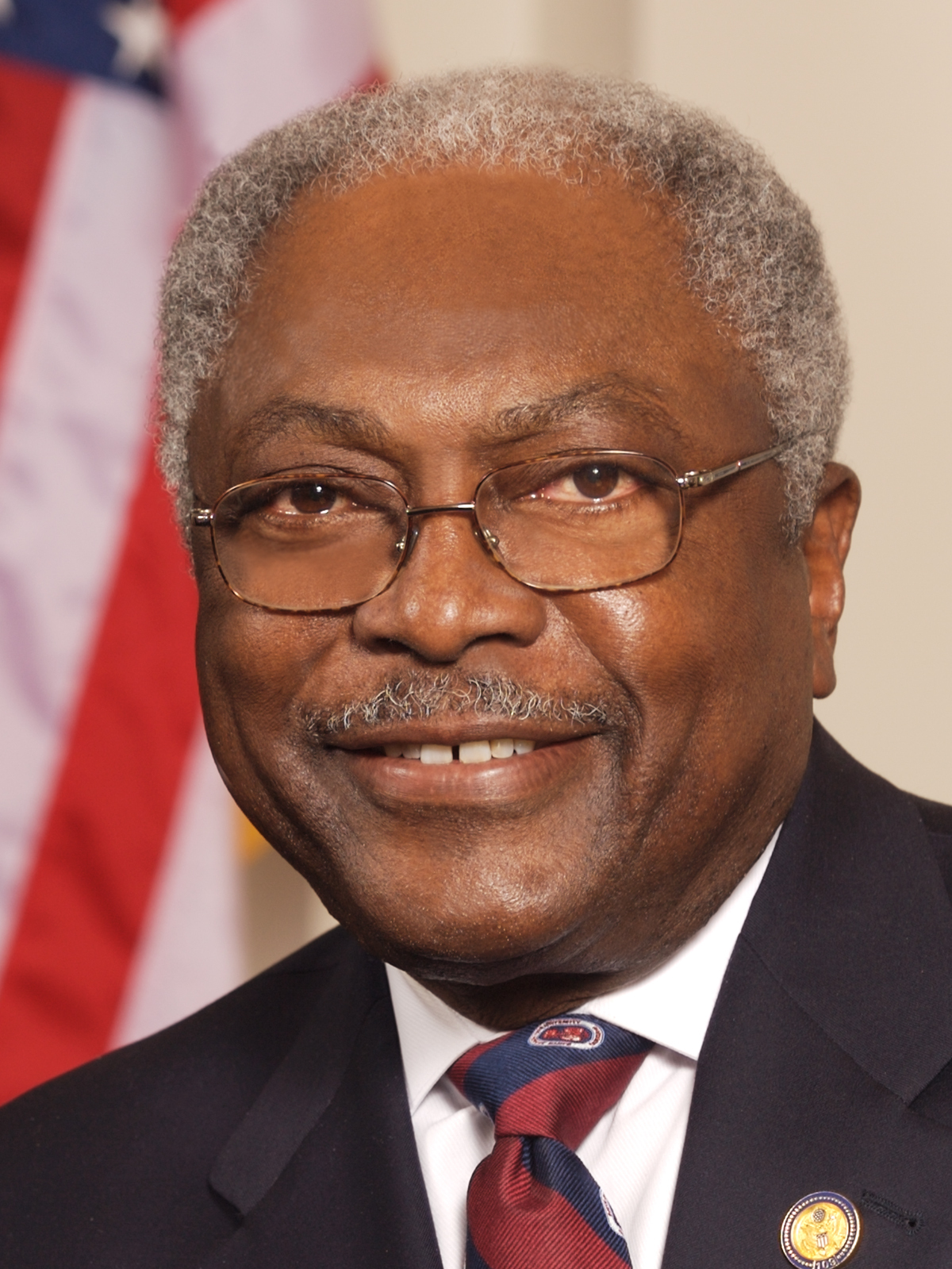

Nominee	Jim Clyburn	Laura Sterling
Party	Democratic	Republican
Popular vote	177,947	70,099
Percentage	70.1%	27.6%
- Clyburn: 40–50% 50–60% 60–70% 70–80% 80–90% >90% Sterling: 40–50% 50–60% 60–70% 70–80% 80–90% Tie: 40–50% No data
U.S. Representative before election
Jim Clyburn
Democratic
Elected U.S. Representative
Jim Clyburn
Democratic

The 6th district is located in central and southern South Carolina. The incumbent was Democrat Jim Clyburn, who had represented the district since 1993. The Green Party nominee was Prince Charles Mallory. The district had a PVI of D+21.

=== Democratic primary ===
==== Candidates ====
===== Nominee =====
- Jim Clyburn, incumbent U.S. representative

===== Withdrawn =====
- Ben Garves

=== Republican primary ===
==== Candidates ====
===== Nominee =====
- Laura Sterling

=== General election ===
==== Predictions ====
Source	Ranking	As of
The Cook Political Report	Safe D	November 7, 2016
Daily Kos Elections	Safe D	November 7, 2016
Rothenberg	Safe D	November 3, 2016
Sabato's Crystal Ball	Safe D	November 7, 2016
RCP	Safe D	October 31, 2016

==== Results ====
South Carolina's 6th congressional district, 2016
Party	Candidate	Votes	%
Democratic	Jim Clyburn (incumbent)	177,947	70.1
Republican	Laura Sterling	70,099	27.6
Libertarian	Rich Piotrowski	3,131	1.2
Green	Prince Charles Mallory	2,499	1.0
Write-in		225	0.1
Total votes		253,901	100.0
Democratic hold			

== District 7 ==
2016 South Carolina's 7th congressional district election
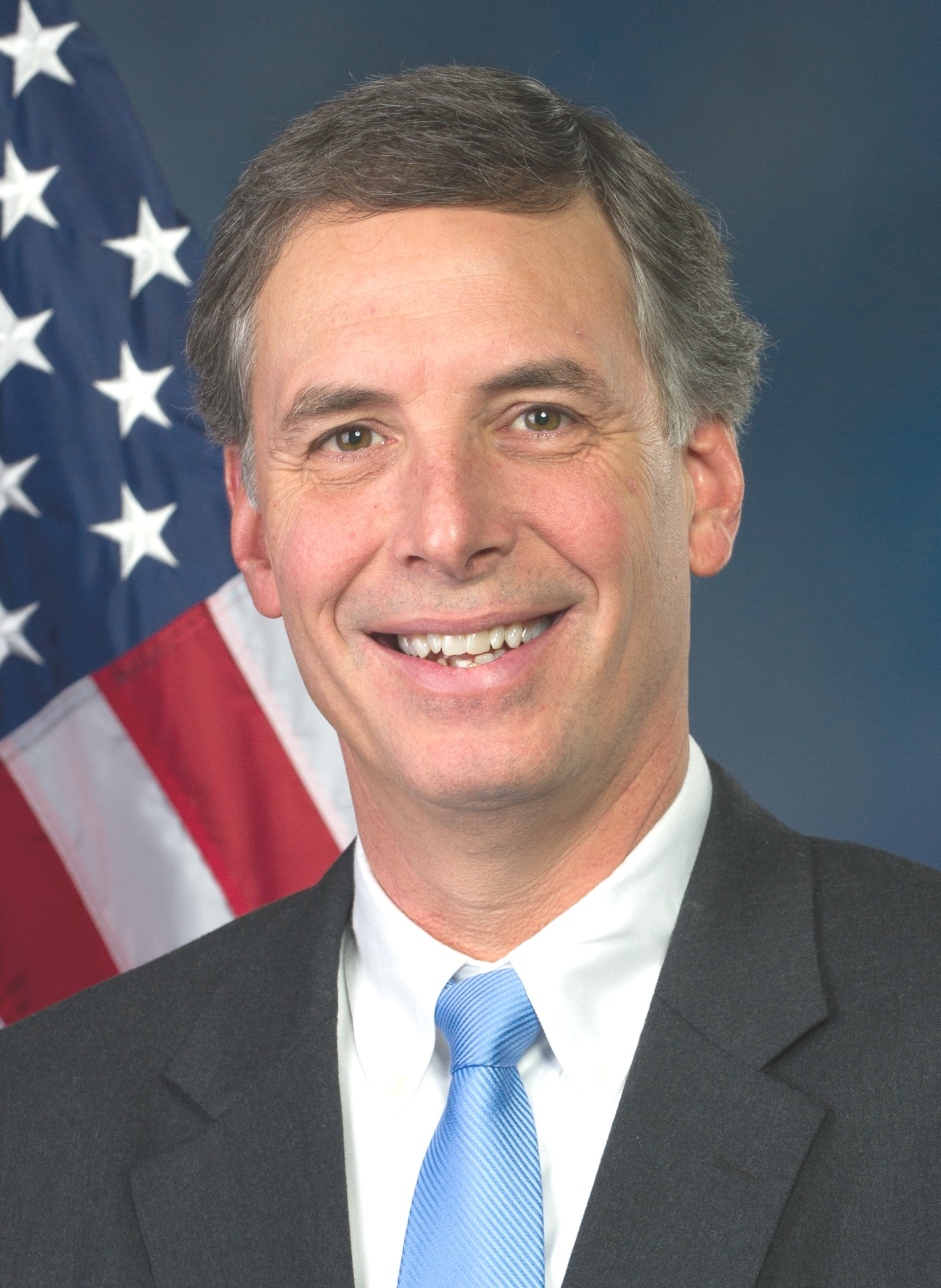

Nominee	Tom Rice	Mal Hyman
Party	Republican	Democratic
Popular vote	176,468	112,744
Percentage	61.0%	38.9%
- Rice: 50–60% 60–70% 70–80% 80–90% >90% Hyman: 50–60% 60–70% 70–80% 80–90% >90%
U.S. Representative before election
Tom Rice
Republican
Elected U.S. Representative
Tom Rice
Republican

The 7th district is located in northeastern South Carolina. The incumbent was Republican Tom Rice, who had represented this district since 2013. The Democratic and Green Party candidate was Mal Hynam. The district had a PVI of R+7.

=== Republican primary ===
==== Candidates ====
===== Nominee =====
- Tom Rice, incumbent U.S. representative

=== Democratic primary ===
==== Candidates ====
===== Nominee =====
- Mal Hyman, Coker University professor

=== General election ===
==== Predictions ====
Source	Ranking	As of
The Cook Political Report	Safe R	November 7, 2016
Daily Kos Elections	Safe R	November 7, 2016
Rothenberg	Safe R	November 3, 2016
Sabato's Crystal Ball	Safe R	November 7, 2016
RCP	Safe R	October 31, 2016

==== Results ====
South Carolina's 7th congressional district, 2016
Party	Candidate	Votes	%
Republican	Tom Rice (incumbent)	176,468	61.0
Democratic	Mal Hyman	112,744	38.9
Write-in		251	0.1
Total votes		289,463	100.0
Republican hold			
