= Josh Kimbrell =

American politician (born 1984)

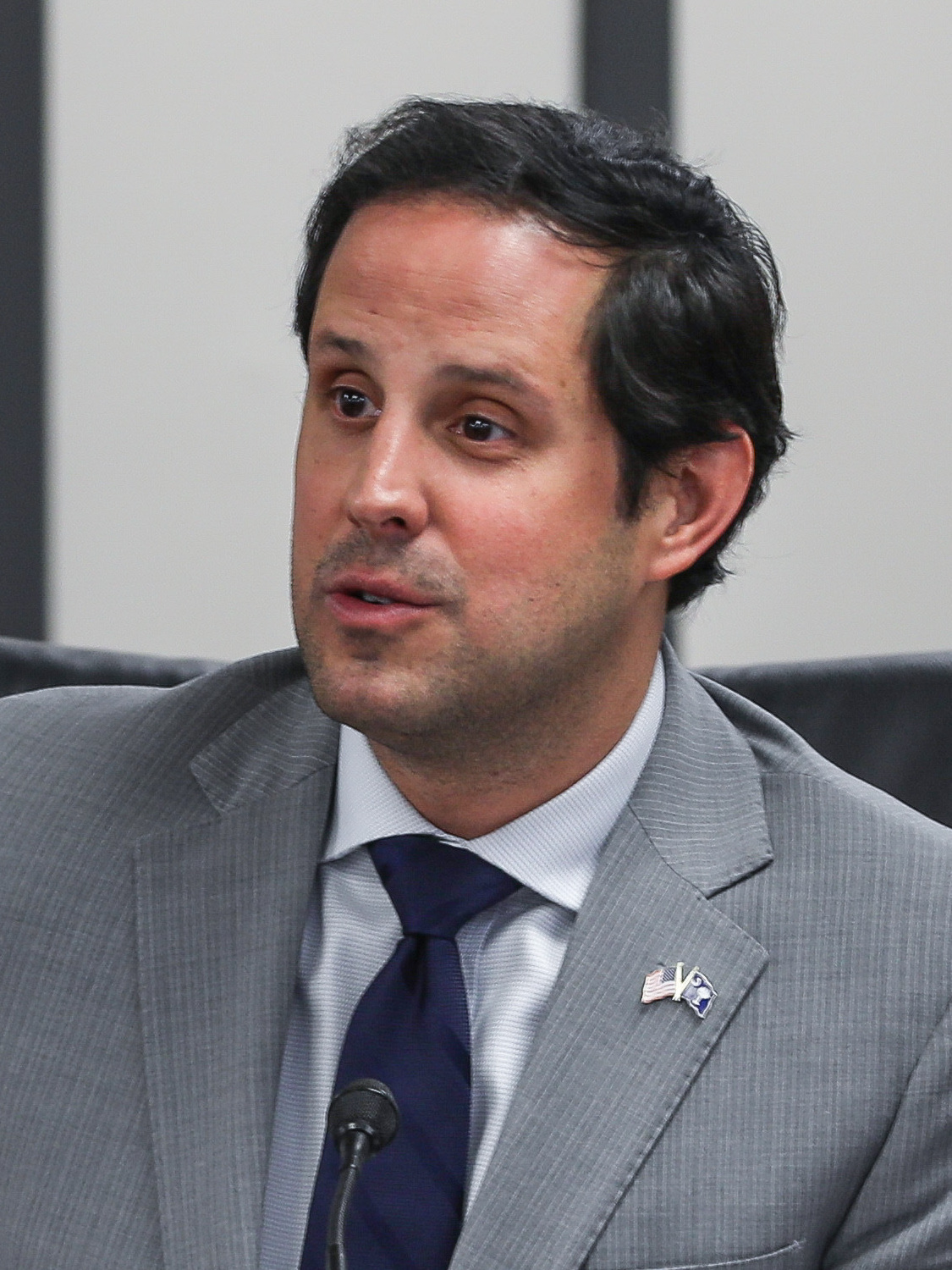
- Kimbrell in a confirmation hearing in 2025

Member of the South Carolina Senate from the 11th district
- Incumbent
- Assumed office November 9, 2020
- Preceded by: Glenn G. Reese

Personal details
- Born: Joshua Brett Kimbrell; December 18, 1984 (age 41) Spartanburg, South Carolina, U.S.
- Party: Republican
- Spouse: Liliya Kimbrell (m. 2017)
- Children: 2
- Education: North Greenville University (BA); Gardner-Webb University (attended)

Joshua Brett Kimbrell (born December 18, 1984) is an American former aviation leasing operator and politician. He is also a former Christian talk radio host.

Kimbrell has served as a member of the South Carolina Senate from the 11th District (Spartanburg) since his 2020 election. He is a member of the Republican Party.

== Political career ==
=== S.C. Senate ===
In 2020, Kimbrell defeated incumbent Democrat Glenn G. Reese, who had held the seat in the South Carolina Senate's 11th District since 1991.

In June 2021, Kimbrell sponsored a bill in the state senate that would "allow mental health professionals to refuse to provide care that violates their religious beliefs." During the 2022 session, Kimbrell also introduced a budget proviso to ban "prurient" books in children's library sections at public libraries, though some librarians and other lawmakers said the language was too vague to enforce without banning a wide variety of books.

=== 2026 gubernatorial campaign ===
On March 24, 2025, Kimbrell formed an exploratory committee to explore running in the 2026 South Carolina gubernatorial election. He announced his candidacy for governor on June 23, 2025. On June 3, 2026, according to WIS-TV news reports, Kimbrell suspended his campaign.

== Endorsements ==
Kimbrell supported Florida Governor Ron Desantis in the 2024 Republican Party presidential primaries, traveling with him to Iowa as a surrogate for the campaign. When Desantis withdrew from the race and endorsed former President Donald Trump, Kimbrell switched his endorsement to Trump.

== Personal life ==
In October 2014, Kimbrell was arrested and charged with sex crimes against his 3-year-old son. After being held in jail without bail, the charges were dropped due to insufficient evidence in February 2015.

In July 2025, Kimbrell’s business partner at Exodus Aircraft, Greenville SC businessman Frank Rogers, filed a civil lawsuit against Josh Kimbrell and his wife Liliya claiming that Kimbrell stole over 2 million dollars from him. The lawsuit claims that Kimbrell created a company named Exodus Airways and sent clients invoices for Exodus Aircraft, and provided bank routing and account information for his company, Exodus Airways so that he would be paid for those invoices under his new LLC that he co-owns with his wife Liliya. The suit also claims Liliya created various PayPal accounts and had payments made from Exodus Aircraft into her PayPal accounts, and the money was then redistributed elsewhere. Rogers claimed that Kimbrell stole this money from Exodus Aircraft and used it for personal expenses and used to it finance his state senate campaign runs.

== Electoral history ==
Year	Office	Type	Party	Main opponent	Party	Votes for Kimbrell				Result	Swing	Ref.
Year	Office	Type	Party	Main opponent	Party	Total	%	P.	±%	Result	Swing	Ref.
2018	U.S. House of Representatives	Rep. primary	Republican	William Timmons	Republican	7,465	11.13%	4th	N/A	Lost	N/A	
2020	S.C. Senate	General	Republican	Glenn G. Reese (Note: Incumbent seeking re-election.)	Democratic	26,117	55.34%	1st	N/A	Won	Gain	
