= Herb Kirsh =

American politician

Member of the South Carolina House of Representatives from the 47th district
- In office 1978–2010
- Succeeded by: Tommy Pope

Mayor of Clover, South Carolina
- In office 1975–1978

Personal details
- Born: May 17, 1929 New York City, New York, U.S.
- Died: January 28, 2014 (aged 84) Gaston County, North Carolina, U.S.
- Party: Democratic
- Spouse: Suzanne Selikowitz (m. 1950; died 2009)
- Children: 4
- Education: Duke University
- Profession: Businessman

Herbert Kirsh (May 17, 1929 – January 28, 2014) was an American politician in the State of South Carolina. He has been recognized as an Outstanding Eagle Scout.

== Background ==
Born in New York City, Kirsh moved with his family in 1937 to Clover, South Carolina. He attended Duke University and was involved in local politics in his hometown, serving as the mayor from 1975 to 1978. He was a member of the United States Naval Reserve and the owner of the Kirsh Department Store in Clover, a business started by his father.

He represented the South Carolina House of Representatives' 47th electoral district as a Democrat from 1978 to 2010, when he was defeated for re-election by Tommy Pope. Until his defeat in 2010, he was the longest-serving state representative in South Carolina and the longest-serving Jewish member of the South Carolina General Assembly in state history. The Herbert Kirsh Wildlife Conservation Area is named after him.

From December 2013 into January 2014, Kirsh suffered a series of falls, resulting in his being hospitalized and put on life support. Doctors found blood clots in his legs and his health declined. His family decided to remove him from life support on January 28, 2014. He was 84 years old. He was married to his wife Suzanne from 1950 until her death in 2009. They are survived by two of their four children.
