= Alliance Party of South Carolina =

- Chairperson: Jim Rex
- Founded: January 2014; 12 years ago
- Headquarters: Great Falls, South Carolina, U.S.
- Ideology: Centrism
- National affiliation: Alliance Party
- Seats in the Upper House: 0 / 46
- Seats in the Lower House: 0 / 124

Website
- https://sc.theallianceparty.com/

The Alliance Party of South Carolina, known as the American Party of South Carolina until 2018, is a third party in the United States.

== Background ==
The Alliance Party of South Carolina was launched in late February 2019.

== Elections ==
In the 2018 South Carolina elections, the party unsuccessfully ran thirteen candidates, one of whom was under a fusion vote with the Democratic Party, for public office.

In the 2020 South Carolina elections, the Alliance Party's presidential candidate Roque "Rocky" De La Fuente Guerra, received 1,862 votes, around 0.07%. The party unsuccessfully ran five other candidates for public office.

In the 2022 South Carolina elections, the party unsuccessfully ran three candidates. Sarah E. Work performed the best of the three with her bid for state treasurer, gaining 281,695 votes, around 19.86% of the vote, in a two way race against a Republican candidate.

=== 2024 elections ===
Map showing South Carolina ballot access for Robert F. Kennedy Jr. in the 2024 presidential election.

On May 31, 2024, the party nominated Independent Robert F. Kennedy, Jr. for president, granting him ballot access in South Carolina. The party nominated two additional federal candidates: Michael Bedenbaugh for the South Carolina's 3rd Congressional District seat being vacated by Republican Jeff Duncan, and Joseph Oddo for South Carolina's 6th Congressional District seat against incumbent Democrat Jim Clyburn The party is running two candidates for the South Carolina General Assembly: Sarah Work who ran in 2022, running for State Senate District 15, and Jackie Todd for State House District 8. In March, James Albert Pauling filed to run as the party candidate for Marlboro County Sheriff.

On August 23, 2024, Kennedy suspended his campaign and endorsed Donald Trump. The Alliance Party removed Kennedy from the South Carolina ballot on August 27, before the September 3 deadline, resulting in having no presidential candidate at the top of their 2024 ticket.

== Platform ==
According to the American Party, it supported term limits, campaign finance reform, and "attacking problems from the center instead of the left or the right".

== See also ==
- Centrism
- List of political parties in the United States
- Third Party (United States)
