= Hinton (name) =

Hinton is both a surname and a given name. Notable people with the name include:

== Surname ==
- Alan Hinton (born 1942), British soccer player, coach, and broadcaster
- Algia Mae Hinton (1929–2018), American singer
- Alistair Hinton (born 1950), Scottish composer
- Amir Hinton (born 1997), American basketball player
- Arthur Hinton (1869–1941), English composer
- Carma Hinton, Chinese documentary filmmaker, daughter of William Hinton
- Charles Howard Hinton (1853–1907), British mathematician and science fiction author, coiner of the word "tesseract"
- Charles Louis Hinton (1869–1950) American artist, illustrator, and educator
- Christopher Hinton (disambiguation), several people
- Craig Hinton (1964–2006), British writer who authored several Doctor Who novels
- Dan Hinton (1953–1994), Canadian ice hockey player
- Darby Hinton (born 1957), American actor
- Deane R. Hinton (1923–2017), American diplomat
- Denis Hinton (born 1939), Australian politician
- Denise Hinton, United States deputy surgeon general
- Ed Hinton (sportswriter) (born 1948), American motor racing sportswriter
- Ed Hinton (actor) (1919–1958), American actor
- Eddie Hinton (1944–1995), American songwriter and session musician
- Eddie Hinton (American football) (born 1947), American football player
- Geoffrey Hinton (born 1947), British-Canadian computer scientist
- Howard Hinton (art patron) (1867–1948), Australian art patron and benefactor
- Howard Hinton (1912–1977), British entomologist
- Jack Hinton (1909–1997), New Zealand soldier and recipient of the Victoria Cross
- James Hinton (disambiguation), several people
  - James Myles Hinton (1891–1970), African American businessperson, civil rights leader
- Jane Hinton, one of first two African-American women to gain the degree of Doctor of Veterinary Medicine (1919-2003)
- Joan Hinton, American nuclear physicist who lived in China after 1949
- Joe Hinton (1929–1968), American soul singer
- John Hinton (disambiguation), several people
- J. M. Hinton (philosopher) (1923–2000), also known as Michael Hinton, Oxford philosopher, first modern proponent of disjunctive view of perception
- Joseph Hinton (composer) (1862 – after 1909), British composer and organist
- Kendall Hinton (born 1997), American football player
- Kyle Hinton (born 1998), American football player
- Leanne Hinton, American linguist
- Marcus Hinton (born 1971), American football player
- Martin Hinton (1883–1961), English zoologist
- Martin Hinton (judge), Justice of the Supreme Court of South Australia
- Marvin Hinton (1940–2025), English footballer
- Mary Hinton (academic), American academic
- Mary Hilliard Hinton (1869–1961), American anti-suffragist and historian
- Milt Hinton (1910–2000), American jazz double bassist
- Myles Hinton (born 2002), American football player
- Nate Hinton (born 1999), American basketball player
- Paula Hinton (1924–1996), English ballet dancer
- Primrose Rupp Hinton (1889–1969), American journalist
- Ronald Hinton (born 1972), American serial killer
- S. E. Hinton (born 1948), American author of young adult novels
- Tracey Hinton (born 1970), Welsh athlete
- William A. Hinton (politician), American politician
- William Augustus Hinton, American bacteriologist, first African American professor at Harvard
- William H. Hinton (1919–2004), American Marxist who chronicled the Chinese Communist Revolution, most notably in his work Fanshen

== Given name ==
- Hinton Battle (1956–2024), American actor, dancer, and dance teacher
- Hinton James, several people
- Hinton Rowan Helper (1829–1909), American anti-slavery writer
- Arthur Hinton Rosenfeld (1926-2017), American physicist
