= Dr. Cyril O. Spann Medical Office =

Historic place in South Carolina, US

- U.S. National Register of Historic Places
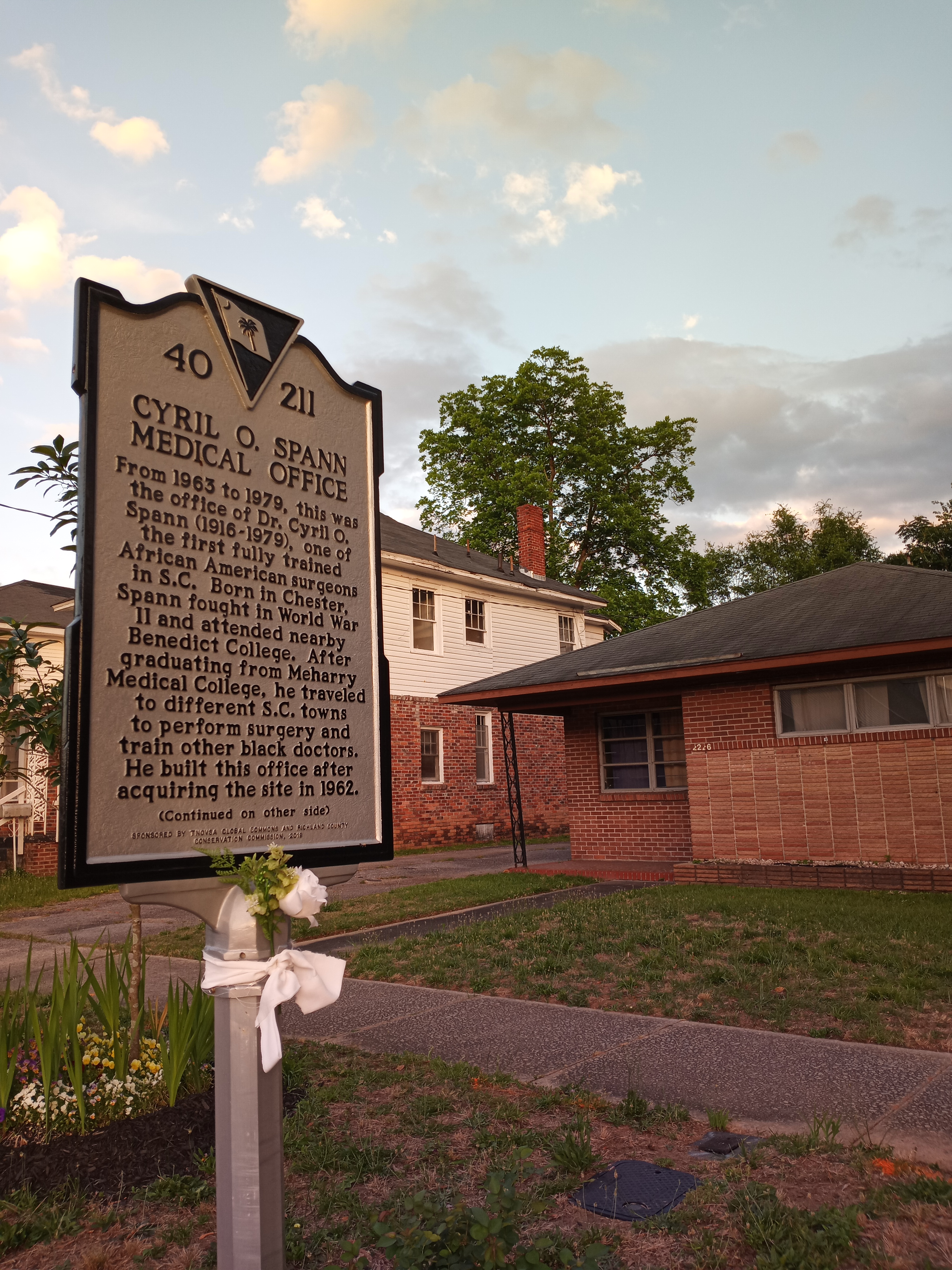
- Dr. Cyril O. Spann Medical Office and historical marker

- Location within South Carolina Location within the United States
- Location: 2226 Hampton St.. Columbia, South Carolina
- Coordinates: 34.0106°N 81.0182°W
- Area: less than one acre
- Built: 1963
- Architectural style: Modern
- NRHP reference No.: 100003939
- Added to NRHP: May 20, 2019

The Dr. Cyril O. Spann Medical Office, located in Columbia, South Carolina, served African-American patients during de jure and de facto racial segregation in the United States. Built in 1963, it was added to United States National Register of Historic Places on May 20, 2019.

== History and location ==
The office, built by Dr. Cyril O. Spann in 1963, is a one-story modern brick building near the former Good Samaritan-Waverly Hospital, also known as "Good Sam" Hospital and Waverly Hospital, a historic hospital for African-American patients built in 1952, where Spann served as chief of staff from 1966 until the hospital's closure in 1973. He worked with Black nurses who trained at Columbia Hospital. After the closure of 'Good Sam', and merger of Columbia Hospital into the new Richland Memorial Hospital (now Prisma Health Richland Hospital), Dr. Spann continued to work from his office while serving as attending surgeon there and at Providence Hospital. The Spann Medical Office is significant for its association with segregated medical facilities in Columbia, and with Dr. Spann believed to have been the only Black surgeon in South Carolina in the 1960s and early 70s. Dr. Spann was born in Chester, South Carolina, attended Benedict College and Meharry Medical College and traveled the state to serve Black patients until his death in 1979.

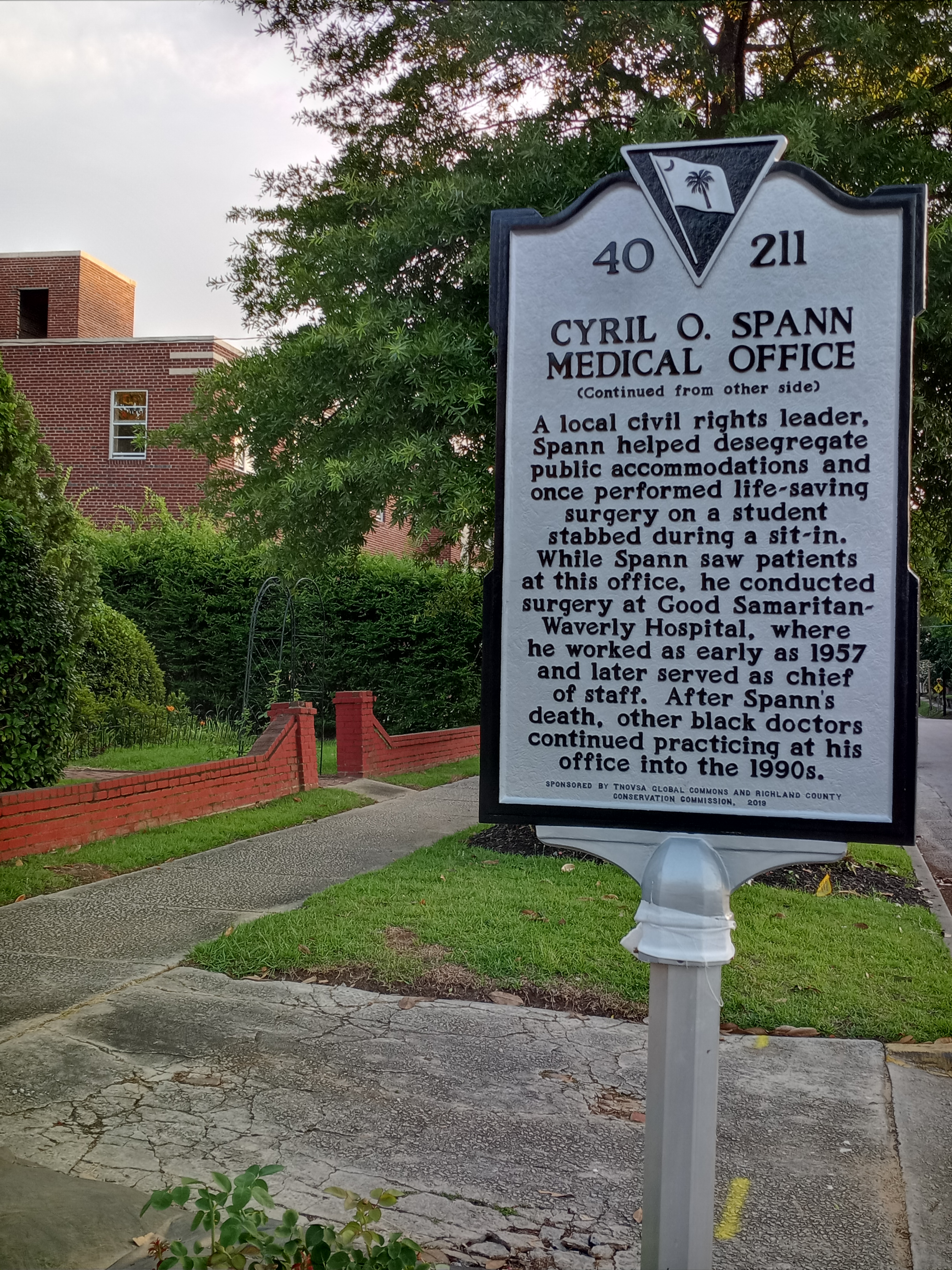
Reverse side of Dr. Cyril O. Spann Medical Office historical marker, Columbia, SC.

The office reflects a shift from earlier African American doctors' offices in Columbia, which were often located in residences or re-purposed buildings. According to his son, Cyril O. Spann Jr., MD, a Gynecologic Oncologist, Dr. Spann was very involved in the design of the building, making sure the modernity of the office was emphasized through its design. The ribbon windows, stacked course brick veneer, and clean lines of the building adhere closely to the tenets of Modernism/Modern architecture.

== Civil rights significance ==
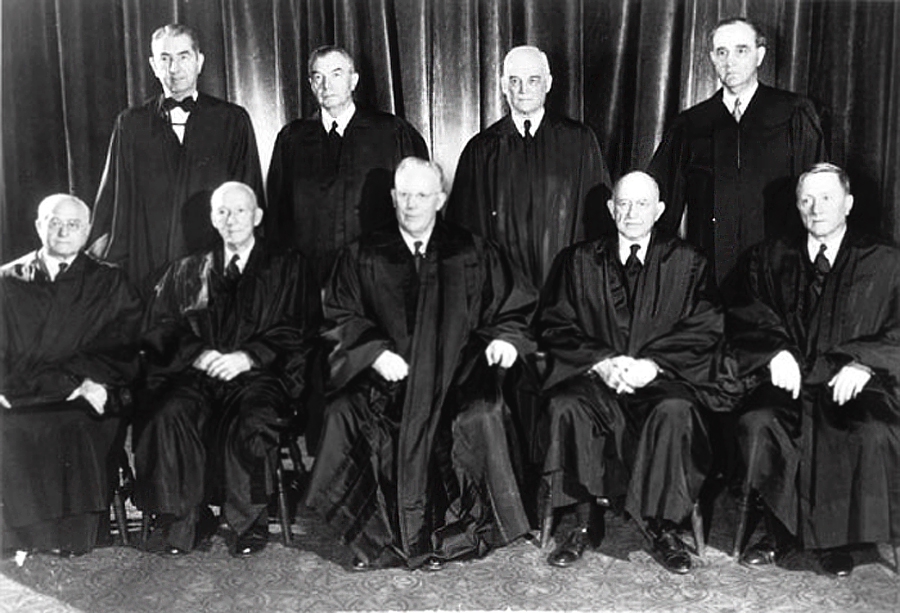
The 'Warren Court' led by Chief Justice Earl Warren, which rendered the Edwards v. South Carolina decision.

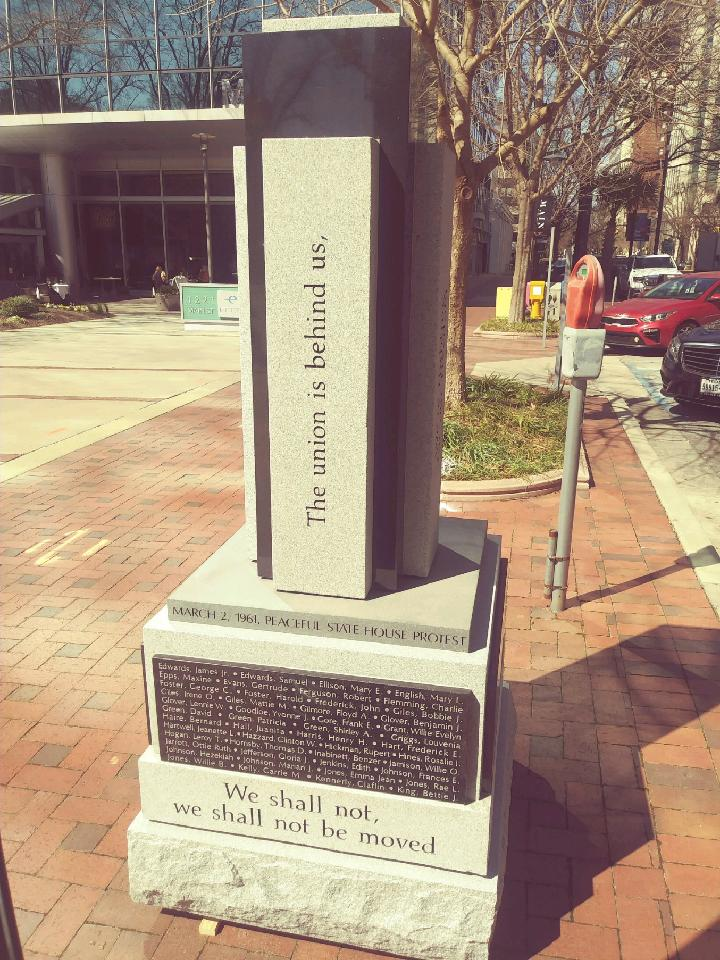
Edwards vs. South Carolina monument, Columbia, SC

Prior to the construction of this office in 1963, Dr. Spann was heavily involved in the local struggle for civil rights. The research of David Barton Smith describes Black physicians of the era who used their local clout and influence to fight for justice during this era as 'Street Fighters' involved in direct actions, or 'Brahmins' who exerted pressure for change behind the scenes. Dr. Spann was a street fighter. He became a life member and Columbia Chapter President of the South Carolina State Conference of NAACP and joined adult leaders attorney Lincoln C. Jenkins Jr.; Matthew J. Perry Jr., Chief Counsel of the South Carolina State Conference of NAACP, and later Federal District Judge of the United States District Court for the District of South Carolina; and Isaiah DeQuincey Newman, SC State Conference of NAACP Field Director in supporting a major student-led march on the South Carolina State House grounds on March 2, 1961. More than 187 of the student protesters were detained by police, and Spann was instrumental in getting the funds to pay the bail of those arrested. The resulting lawsuit, Edwards v. South Carolina, reached the Supreme Court of the United States, led at that time by Chief Justice Earl Warren and his 'Warren Court'.

On February 25, 1963, the court ruled that the 14th amendment forbids states "to make criminal the peaceful expression of unpopular views," providing legal protection for similar protests nationwide. In Columbia, the marchers and their supporters, including Dr. Spann, representing the bondsmen who bailed the demonstrators out of jail, told those present that 'his group was satisfied to have acted as it did and would do the same thing again under similar circumstances.' He continued to help young protestors in his normal line of work, using his surgical skills to save the life of Benedict College student Lennie W. Glover after he was stabbed in a Columbia Woolworth's by a white assailant while participating in a sit-in. The event was picked up in national news and featured in Jet Magazine.

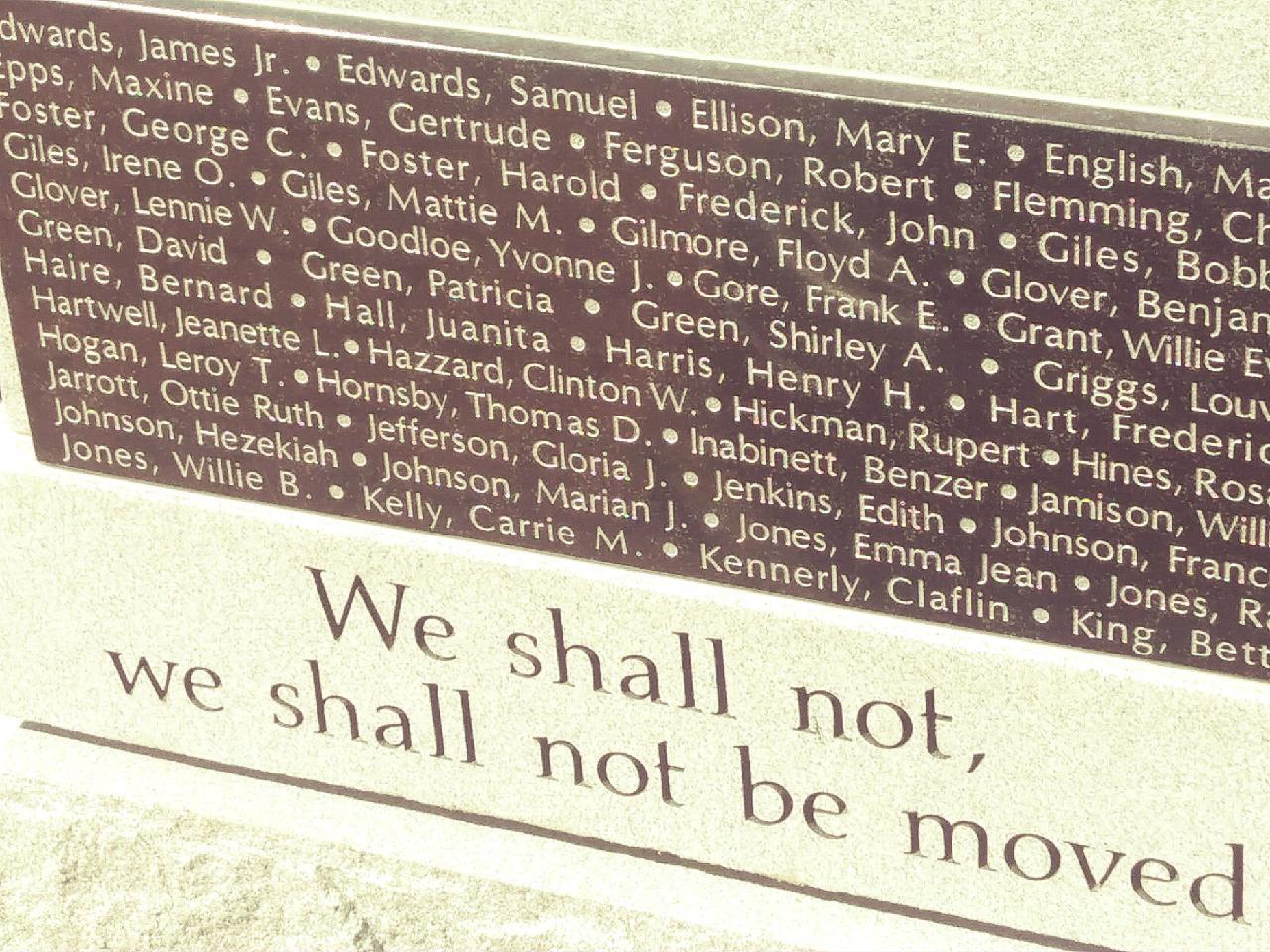
Name of Lennie W. Glover engraved on Edwards vs. South Carolina monument, Columbia, SC (Left, fifth from the top). Dr. Spann saved Lennie's life after he was stabbed by a white assailant during a 1961 sit-in at a Columbia Woolworth's, not long after the March protest.

During this period of student marches and activism, court rulings, and efforts by the white establishment to control the pace of racial change, Dr. Spann personally participated in other efforts to desegregate Columbia. Lester Bates was elected Mayor of Columbia, South Carolina in 1958 and soon encountered students setting the pace for racial change, with sit-ins and protests starting in 1960. Bates responded by working with committees of Black and white community leaders—with whom he first met separately—to discuss how to best avoid the violent reactions to desegregation that were taking place in other cities across the South. Desegregation talks were held privately, while Allen University and Benedict College students protested publicly. In September 1962, after Columbia's lunch counters were desegregated, students and others turned their attention to segregation in the area's movie theatres. After students picketed and protested these businesses, the secret committee of Blacks and whites moved to quietly end segregationist practices in theaters. On June 5, 1963, I. DeQuincey Newman targeted eight South Carolina cities, including Columbia, for massive protests, and sent each mayor a list of demands.

Rev. James Myles Hinton, a member of the committee, arranged for Dr. Spann to systematically integrate the Palmetto Theater on Main Street between December 20 and January 6, 1963, as a 'test case'. Bates used this method of controlling the process of integration, with one Columbia space after another integrating in an orchestrated, gradual way. Dr. Spann joined John Henry McCray and other black leaders in approaching Mayor Lester Bates and Columbia City Council and 'won from them a promise of cooperation' to end segregation in downtown businesses. Dr. Spann and John H McCray were part of an ad hoc committee, which also consisted of J.A. Bacoats, president of Benedict College; Reverend Maxie S. Gordon Sr.; James M. Hinton, C.D. Ingram, Willis C. Johnson, I. P. Stanback, Reverend Roscoe C. Wilson Sr. (Grandfather of professional basketball player A'ja Wilson), and Howard Emery Wright, president of Allen University. Researcher Brad Sauls noted: "Columbia's wealth of exceptional leaders prevented the city from experiencing the tragedies and violence that scarred other cities in the Deep South".

When Dr. Spann bought the property for his new office in 1962, the attorneys who handled his property transactions were Lincoln C. Jenkins Jr., (who, along with Matthew J. Perry Jr., Jack Greenberg, Constance Baker Motley, James M. Nabrit III and Donald James Sampson, argued the Edwards v. South Carolina case before the Supreme Court of the United States), and Harold R. Boulware, who, along with Thurgood Marshall and Robert L. Carter, filed Elmore v. Rice, the class action suit that opened up the Democratic Primaries to Black voters in 1947

== A legacy of Black physicians ==
The medical office at 2226 Hampton, now referred to as the Dr. Cyril O. Spann Medical Office, was operated exclusively by African American physicians from 1963 until 1996, recorded in Columbia City Directories. In addition to Dr. Albert L. Reid, who shared the space with Dr. Spann, a number of prominent African American doctors worked in the office during the 1980s and 1990s. Dr. Everett L. Dargan, who had his offices here in 1980 and 1981, published significant Ascending cholangitis research, and argued for changes at the federal level to support medical services for the poor and indigent, ultimately receiving Congressional recognition of his legacy from Jim Clyburn.

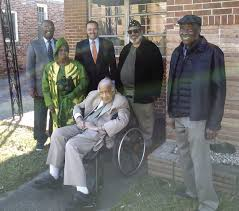
Physicians who practiced in the Spann Medical Office Left to right: Gerald A. Wilson, MD; Jean Hopkins, RN; Rodney Reid, MD and his father, Albert Reid, MD (seated); Burnett W. Gallman, MD and Everett L. Dargan, MD. Not shown: Stuart A. Hamilton, MD and Vera McBryde, MD.

Other prestigious Black doctors who worked from 2226 Hampton included Drs. Ronald Johnson and Burnett W. Gallman Jr., from 1982 to 1987, the latter of whom was recognized in the 2018 South Carolina African American History Calendar, and whose grandfather graduated from Leonard Medical School in 1906; Dr. Gerald A. Wilson in 1981, awarded the Order of the Palmetto, one of South Carolina's most prestigious honors, and Physician of the Year in 2017; Dr. Vera McBryde of Latta, SC from 1990 to 1992, believed to be the first Black woman to become a Board certified physician in the state of SC and Dr. Stuart A. Hamilton from 1994 to 1996, founder of the Eau Claire Cooperative Community Health Clinic System, which serves low income patients in four South Carolina counties. Hamilton is also an Order of the Palmetto recipient.

== Other site protections and recognition ==
In addition to its National Register of Historic Places status, the Spann Medical Office falls within the boundaries of Waverly Protection Area, a Preservation District within the City of Columbia Urban Design and Historic Preservation District system. This Preservation District is an expansion of Waverly Historic District.

The Dr. Cyril O. Spann Medical Office historical marker from the South Carolina Department of Archives and History was unveiled on November 19, 2019, with presentations made by former Chief Justice of the South Carolina Supreme Court Jean H. Toal, State Representative Kambrell Garvin, and Chester County Councilwoman Mary A. Guy.

A dedication ceremony for a tree of peace and resistance also held that day recognized actions of mutual support between members of Emanual African Methodist Episcopal Church who experienced the Charleston Church Shooting and members of the Tree of Life _ Or L'Simcha Congregation after the Pittsburgh synagogue shooting; historic ties between the Spann Medical Office, the Visanska Starks House and Good Samaritan Waverly Hospital, and expressed a commitment to public health and non-violence. The hospital will be dedicated to the nine persons slain in the Charleston church shooting at Emanuel African Methodist Episcopal Church, to include Pastor and South Carolina Senator Clementa C. Pinckney and two other Allen University alumni.

== See also ==
- South Carolina in the civil rights movement
- National Register of Historic Places listings in South Carolina
- List of African-American historic places in South Carolina
- List of African-American historic places
- Medical racism in the United States
- Race and health in the United States
- Health equity

== Bibliography ==
- Epps, Anna L. Cherrie, Ph.D., and Morris Hammock, Patricia. An Act of Grace: The Right Side of History. United States. 2009.
- 'Seven Historic SC Properties Added To the National Register of Historic Places, Including Two Charleston Sites'. Charleston Chronicle, June 11, 2019.
- Williams, Emily. 'Seven SC properties, including historic hotel for Black travelers, added to National Register' . Charleston Post and Courier, June 4, 2019
- Parker, Adam. '1961 civil rights rally in Columbia remembered with marker, memorial and ceremony.' Charleston Post and Courier, March 2, 2021.
- Breeden, Edwin. 'A Guidebook to South Carolina Historical Markers'. University of South Carolina Press, 2021.
- Wakeman, Emily. 'Allen University breathes new life into hospital once used to serve African Americans in segregation-era' WIS-TV, January 21, 2020.
