= South Carolina in the civil rights movement =

South Carolina
- Part of the Civil Rights Movement
- Date: 1954–1968 (Note: Various other dates have been proposed as the date on which the civil rights movement began or ended.)
- Location: South Carolina, United States
- Caused by: Racial segregation in schools and public accommodations
- Result: Judicial rulings; Briggs v. Elliott (1952); Flemming v. South Carolina Electric and Gas (1954); Edwards v. South Carolina (1962); Peterson v. City of Greenville (1962); Brown v. South Carolina State Forestry Commission (1963)

Prior to the civil rights movement in South Carolina, African Americans in the state had very few political rights. South Carolina briefly had a majority-black government during the Reconstruction era after the Civil War, but with the 1876 inauguration of Governor Wade Hampton III, a Democrat who supported the disenfranchisement of blacks, African Americans in South Carolina struggled to exercise their rights. Poll taxes, literacy tests, and intimidation kept African Americans from voting, and it was virtually impossible for someone to challenge the Democratic Party, which ran unopposed in most state elections for decades. By 1940, the voter registration provisions written into the 1895 constitution effectively limited African-American voters to 3,000—only 0.8 percent of those of voting age in the state.

Jim Crow laws, legalized by the Supreme Court case Plessy v. Ferguson (1896), created a district color line across the South. African Americans were prohibited from using the same facilities as white Americans, and African-American children were prohibited from attending white schools; schools meant for colored children were typical of lower quality than white schools. Public segregation and voting restrictions were eventually reversed after the events of the civil rights movement in South Carolina and the United States during the 1950s and the 1960s.

== Background ==
The passage of the Thirteenth, Fourteenth, and Fifteenth amendments to the United States Constitution in the years following the Civil War provided for the enfranchisement of African Americans in South Carolina. During the Reconstruction era, South Carolinians elected a majority-black legislature. Additionally, several African Americans were elected to other higher offices, including Robert Smalls and Richard H. Cain to the U.S. House of Representatives, Alonzo J. Ransier and Richard Howell Gleaves as lieutenant governor, and Francis Lewis Cardozo as South Carolina's secretary of state. Largely, African Americans were free to vote during this period. However, as part of the Compromise of 1877, President Rutherford B. Hayes removed the military occupation of the South, which allowed former Confederates and white supremacists to take power in South Carolina.

During the 1876 gubernatorial election, African Americans were largely prevented from voting. Consequently, the incumbent Republican governor, Daniel Henry Chamberlain, lost reelection and Democrat Wade Hampton III took office. Chamberlain refused to leave office, claiming that the election was invalid because of African Americans' voting rights having been trampled. For a brief period, two governments were formed, but the South Carolina Supreme Court ruled Hampton to be the lawful governor. Over the next decades, African Americans were kept from voting through literacy tests, poll taxes, and intimidation. The Democrat's retaking of power in 1876 allowed for the rise of the Ku Klux Klan, which sought to terrorize African Americans through lynchings and fear. The Plessy v. Ferguson (1896) Supreme Court decision further allowed for the legality of segregation in public facilities and schools that extended into the 1960s.

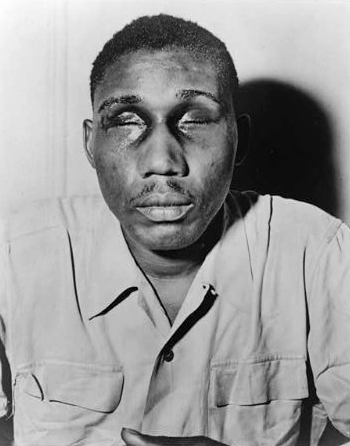
Isaac Woodard, a World War II veteran, after having his eyes gouged out by a police officer in Batesburg-Leesville

In 1944, George Stinney, a 14-year-old black youth, was accused of murdering two white girls, aged 11 and 8, near Alcolu in Clarendon County, South Carolina. Stinney was interrogated by police in a locked room with several white officers and no other witnesses, and it was asserted that he had confessed to the killing within an hour. Stinney's father was fired from his job at a local lumber mill, and his family had to either leave the town or risk lynching. Stinney was rapidly convicted mostly because he faced an all-white jury. Stinney's court-appointed attorney, Charles Plowden, was a tax commissioner with political aspirations, and historians have considered him to have been ineffective in counseling Stinney. On June 16, 1944, Stinney was executed at the South Carolina Penitentiary in Columbia. Seventy years later, historians still questioned whether he was guilty and doubted that he received a fair trial. On December 17, 2014, Stinney's conviction was overturned on the grounds that his constitutional rights had been violated, and his confession had most likely been coerced.

In 1946, Isaac Woodard, an African-American World War II veteran, was attacked hours after being honorably discharged on a bus ride to North Carolina. Woodard and the bus driver argued about whether there was time to use the restroom before the bus departed. When the bus arrived in Batesburg-Leesville, the driver called the police. Woodard was forcibly removed for the bus and attacked by several white men, including the bus driver, several police officers, and Sheriff Lynwood Shull. Woodard was beaten with nightsticks and had his eyes gouged out. Woodard was left permanently blind. The incident sparked national outrage, encouraging President Harry S. Truman to order a federal investigation. The sheriff was indicted and went to trial in a federal court, but he was acquitted by an all-white jury.

Such miscarriages of justice against African Americans, coupled with unfair discrimination laws, influenced South Carolina and the nation toward civil rights initiatives. Much of the civil rights movement in South Carolina was resolved without rioting or violence. African-American protesters were often arrested and sometimes mistreated by police, but protesters typically remained peaceful and nonviolent. Much of the national spotlight during the civil rights movement was focused on Alabama and Mississippi.

== Education ==
=== Public schools ===
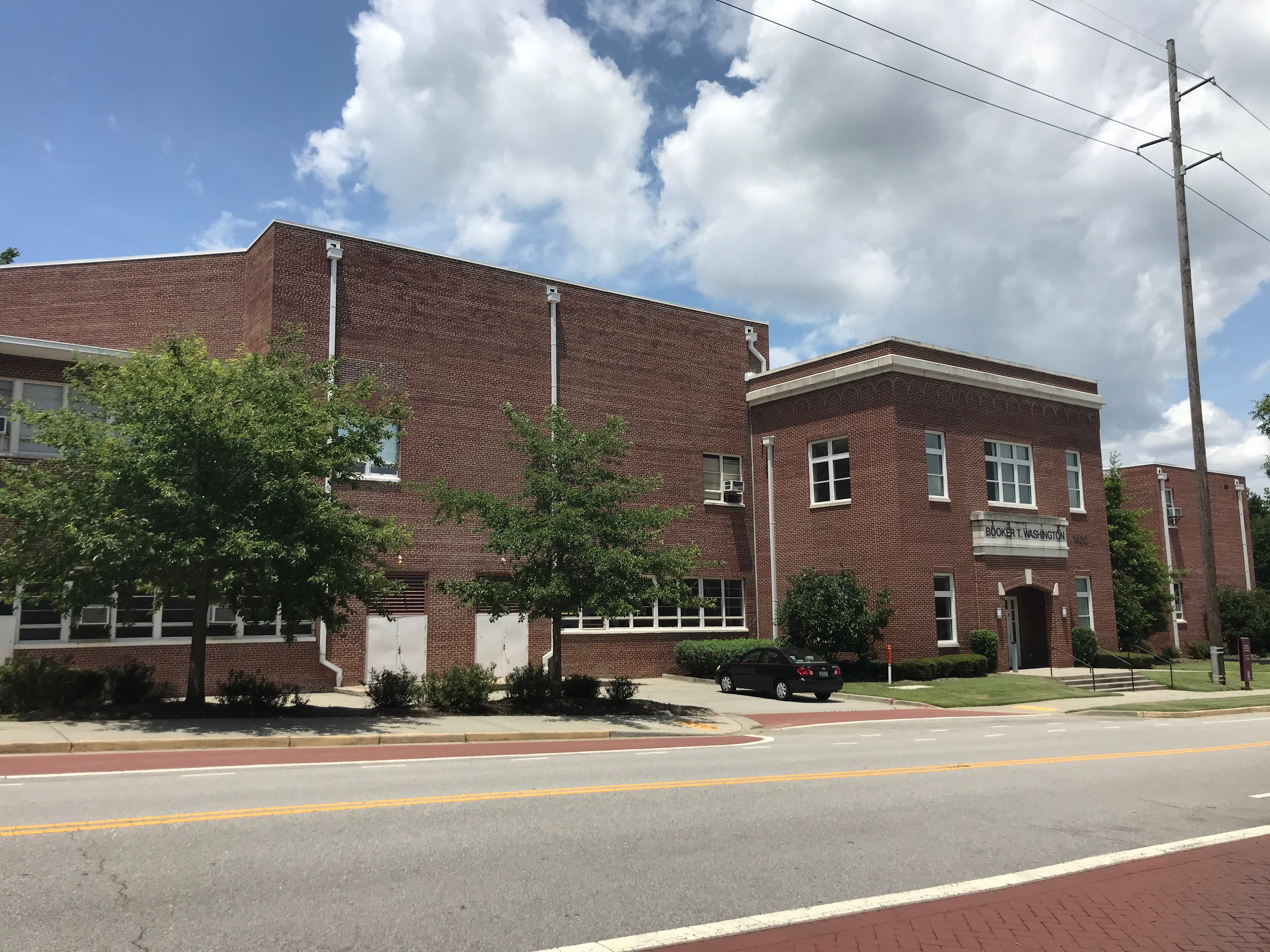
Booker T. Washington High School (Columbia, SC)

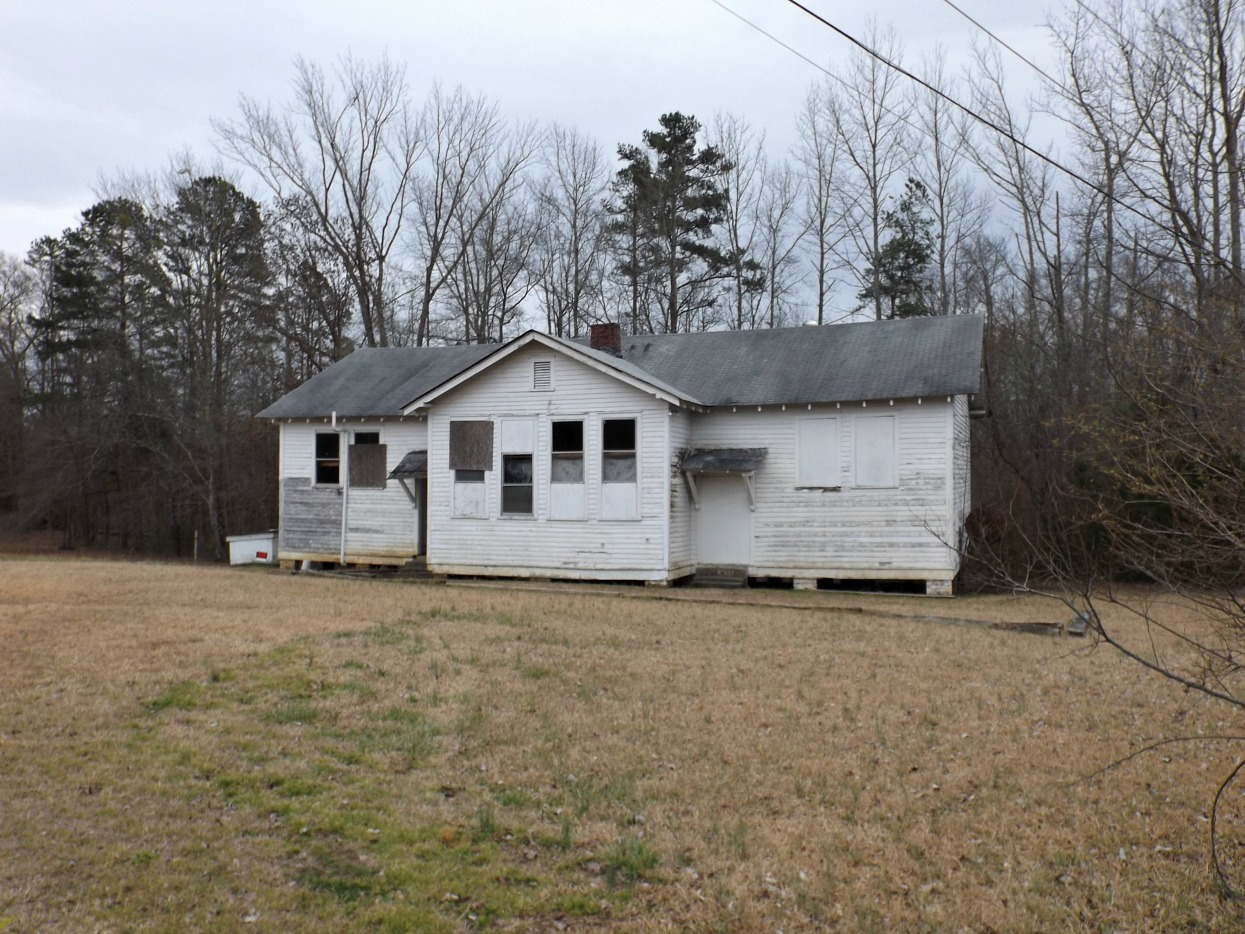
A former black school in Rock Hill, South Carolina, commonly referred to as Rosenwald schools. These schools were typically small, dilapidated, and housed students from multiple ages.

In 1951, Governor James F. Byrnes, supporting the "separate but equal" doctrine required by the Plessy v. Ferguson (1896) decision, proposed a three percent sales tax increase to fund black schools. Byrnes sought to improve black schools to prevent desegregation, and these school improvements were often colloquially regarded to as "equalization schools". In 1952, the United States District Court for the District of South Carolina heard the Briggs v. Elliott case, which argued that unequal schools caused by segregation in Summerton violated African-American children's Fourteenth Amendment right to equal protection under the law. The court ultimately ruled that unequal schools were unconstitutional, but stopped short of requiring schools to integrate. The court in the case of Briggs v. Elliot delivered a verdict that was almost identical to Plessy v. Ferguson in that it provided for legalized segregated facilities based on race so long as the separate facilities were equal. The families of the African-American children in Summerton appealed, and Briggs v. Elliot was the first of five cases to be combined into Brown v. Board of Education (1954), which required the desegregation of schools nationwide. By 1964, South Carolina's 37 Roman Catholic schools desegregated. Desegregation of public schools began in August 1964, though some schools were still segregated into the early 1970s.

Charleston County School District began desegregating in 1963 and was among the earliest to integrate, though the district was still largely segregated. While the district was no longer legally segregated, only 11 black students attended a white school in the first year. The district did not integrate on a large scale until the early 1970s.

Many pro-segregationists supported segregation academies. Between 1963 and 1975, in an extension of white flight, over 200 of these academies were established to keep schools all-white. In 1978, private school enrollment reached a peak of 50,000. In Clarendon County, for example, the private academy Clarendon Hall was established in late 1965 after four black students enrolled in a previously all-white public school. By 1969, only 281 white students were left in the public school system, and only 16 white students were in public schools when they officially desegregated a year later.

=== Colleges and universities ===
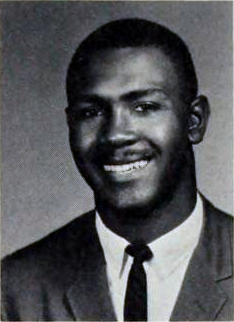
Harvey Gantt was the first African-American student enrolled at Clemson University. He later became the Mayor of Charlotte, North Carolina.

In January 1963, Harvey Gantt became the first black student to attend Clemson University by order of Federal District Judge Charles Cecil Wyche. On May 20, 1963, over 1,000 students at the University of South Carolina protested integration. They marched to the State House chanting "We don't want to integrate". On the campus' Horseshoe, a cross was burned in opposition to the enrollment of African-American students. In September 1963, the University of South Carolina admitted three African-American students by court order: Robert G. Anderson, Henrie Monteith Treadwell and James L. Solomon Jr. Both Clemson and South Carolina desegregated without much resistance.

The College of Charleston refused to abide by the provision of the Civil Rights Act of 1964 and continued to refuse to enroll in African-American students. In July 1965, the Department of Health, Education, and Welfare revoked the ability of students at the college to receive federal loans as long as the college was not integrated. In 1967, the College of Charleston enrolled its first black students.

== Role of historically black colleges and universities in leading protests and boycotts ==
Beginning in February 1960, students at Allen University and Benedict College, two colleges in Columbia, began planning protests against segregation laws. On March 2, approximately fifty students from the two schools participated in lunch counter sit-ins, forcing the businesses to close for the day. The following day, five hundred students gathered to protest, two hundred of whom marched to the city center and the State House. On March 4, several white men burned a cross on the property of Allen University and threw bricks at one of the school buildings in retaliation to the protests. Some black students retorted by breaking car windows at a white drive-in restaurant, an event which the leaders of the student protests condemned. In response, the Mayor of Columbia announced that any person caught protesting would be arrested. Students from Allen and Benedict often met at campus locations or in nearby black churches. Students created flyers and other forms of advertisement to gather support for the civil rights cause.

On March 5, students from Claflin University and South Carolina State University, two colleges in Orangeburg, formed the South Carolina Student Movement Association (SCSM). The association's goal was to create collaboration among all South Carolina black schools to bring about integration by protesting stores and businesses with discriminatory policies. On March 15, the SCSM held simultaneous protests in Orangeburg, Columbia, and Rock Hill, resulting in the arrest of 11 students in Columbia. In Orangeburg, approximately 1,000 students nonviolently protested in the business district, resulting in the arrests of 388 students. Police used fire hoses and tear gas to halt the protest, but the students refused to act violently. Not having enough room in the county jail, some jailed students were house in stockades originally built for cattle; they were subjected to 40-degree rainy weather.

Throughout the summer, the SCSM organized small-scale protests but had difficulty organizing large events. Reverend Isaiah DeQuincey Newman led a group of protesters on a four-mile march to the Columbia municipal airport to protest segregated waiting rooms. A few days later, he led students on a march to Sesquicentennial State Park to protest the all-white policy of the park. On October 15, students at Allen University and Benedict College formed the Student Committee for Human Rights to facilitate citywide organization. On March 2, 1961, exactly one year after the initial protest in Columbia, the Greenville chapter of the NAACP organized a large-scale protest at the South Carolina State House. Over 200 students protested nonviolently and sang religious hymns. State police ordered the protesters to leave, but students refused. 187 of the 200 were arrested and found guilty of "disturbing the peace", though this verdict was overruled in the Supreme Court case Edwards v. South Carolina (1962). Among those arrested were Reverend Newman and future U.S. Congressman and Majority Whip Jim Clyburn.

On March 5, Benedict College student, Lennie Glover, was stabbed at a sit-in at F. W. Woolworth's in Columbia. In response to the stabbing, students led a protest on March 24, the week before Easter, named the "Easter Lennie Glover No Buying Campaign", which called for daily picketing and boycotting of businesses with discriminatory practices. Most businesses and facilities protested by HBCU students were desegregated within four years.

== Protests and desegregation of public facilities ==
From the end of the Reconstruction era until the end civil rights movement, almost every business and public facility across the state was segregated both by custom and by law. For example, a business owner could be fined in the City of Greenville for serving a white and colored person at the same table. The city ordinance is cited below:

"It shall be unlawful for any person owning, managing or controlling any hotel, restaurant, cafe, eating house, boarding-house or similar establishment to furnish meals to white persons and colored persons in the same room, or at the same table, or at the same counter; provided, however, that meals may be served to white persons and colored persons in the same room where separate facilities are furnished.

— Code of Greenville, 1953, as amended in 1958, § 31-8

Nearly every town and cities had segregation laws, ranging from daily shopping businesses and restaurants to public transportation buses, movie theaters, airports, libraries, public parks, swimming pools, restrooms, drinking fountains, and doctors' offices. In Columbia, Dr. Cyril O. Spann Sr., and other community leaders participated in strategic actions that desegregated Columbia's Main Street business district, a history documented by the Dr. Cyril O Spann Medical Office.

== Civil rights movement, 1954–1968 ==
=== Columbia bus system ===
On June 22, 1954, Sarah Mae Flemming sat in the whites-only section of a city bus in Columbia. The bus driver immediately instructed Flemming to stand and wait for a colored seat to become available. Flemming, still two miles from her destination, attempted to exit the bus at the next stop, but the driver blocked the exit and physically assaulted her. Flemming was not arrested, but she did visit the hospital because of the assault. The following week, Modjeska Monteith Simkins heard about Flemming's encounter and hired a lawyer to file a suit against South Carolina Electric and Gas, the owner of the bus. In the case Flemming v. South Carolina Electric and Gas, Flemming's lawyer argued that her Fourteenth Amendment rights had been violated and demanded for $25,000 in punitive damages. Lower courts ruled in the bus company's favor, but after Flemming's lawyer filed the case in a federal suit in the 4th US Circuit Court of Appeals, Flemming won the suit and the court ruled the bus segregation to be unconstitutional, though the court added that bus company did not owe Flemming any money. At the time, the case received little publicity.

=== New Year's Day March ===
In October 1959, Major League Baseball player Jackie Robinson entered the whites-only waiting room at the Greenville Municipal Airport. Airport police asked Robinson to leave, but he refused. Ultimately, the police did not force Robinson to move. At an NAACP speech in Greenville, Robinson urged "complete freedom" and encouraged black citizens to vote and to protest their second-class citizenship. The following January on New Year's Day, approximately 1,000 staged a march to the airport, which was desegregated shortly thereafter.

=== Friendship Nine ===
In 1961, a group of nine African-American men was arrested for staging a sit-in at a segregated McCrory's lunch counter in Rock Hill. The group gained national attention and sparked many other sit-ins across the nation. A major goal of these "Jail, No Bail" protests was to strain the prison system and force integration. The group became known as the "Friendship Nine" because they were students at Friendship College.

=== Greenville Eight ===
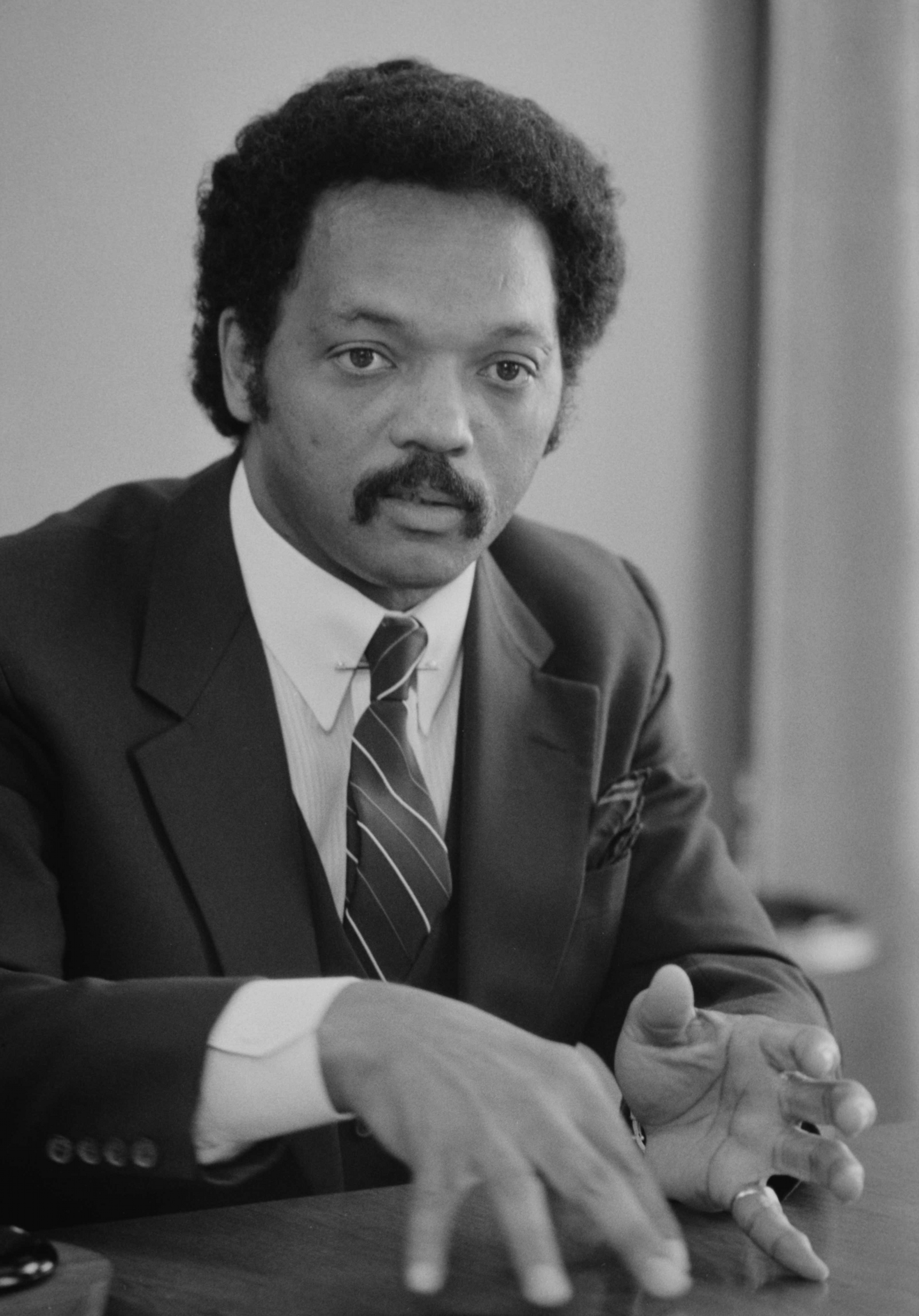
Jesse Jackson of Greenville, SC, led many civil rights campaigns in South Carolina

Public libraries in Columbia and Spartanburg desegregated without controversy. In Greenville, however, on July 16, 1960, eight African-American students protested the segregation practices of the Greenville County public library. The county library had white-only and colored-only branches. The colored branch was a one-room house that had fewer books than the white-only branch. The students entered the white branch of the library. Some selected a book and sat down to read while others browsed the shelves. Several white patrons left the library. The librarian asked the students to leave, but they remain silent and refused to move. When the police arrived, the eight students were arrested, then released on a $30 bond. On July 28, Donald J. Sampson, the students' lawyer, filed a suit against the library system. On September 2, the mayor and the city council instructed the library to close to avoid forced integration. Greenville Mayor J. Kenneth Cass said, "The efforts being made by a few Negroes to use the White library will now deprive all White and Negro citizens of the benefit of a library." Public pressure encouraged Cass to reopen the library system, but he refused to integrate the facility, stating libraries "will not be used for demonstrations, purposeless assembly, or propaganda purposes." But the library desegregated short thereafter, and the charges against the eight students were dropped.

=== Peterson v. City of Greenville (1962) ===
In 1962, ten African-American petitioners in Greenville entered and seated themselves at a lunch counter reserved for whites. The manager called for police, and when the protesters refused to move, they were arrested and taken to the police headquarters. The ten protesters were charged with "trespassing". The case was heard in the Supreme Court Peterson v. City of Greenville (1962). The court ruled in favor of the protesters, stating that the city's segregation law was a violation of their Fourteenth Amendment right.

=== Orangeburg massacre ===
On February 8, 1968, in Orangeburg, three South Carolina State University students were killed and dozens wounded after 200 students protested racial segregation at a local bowling alley. The students were fired upon by highway patrolmen in an event that became known as the Orangeburg massacre. In response to the shooting, South Carolina State University students protested at the State House in March.

=== South Carolina public parks and entertainment venues ===
The U.S. District Court case Brown v. South Carolina State Forestry Commission (1963) ruled that all public parks must desegregate. Instead, the Forestry Commission closed all parks, refusing to open. Parks reopened on a restricted basis in June 1964, nearly a year later, then fully in July 1964. In December 1963, five movie theaters in Columbia agreed to admit one black couple daily, announcing they would fully desegregate by the end of January 1964. In the winter of 1961, eight black men and women were arrested for attempting to use an all-white skating rink and swimming pool in Greenville's Cleveland Park. In 1962, a federal court ruled that the segregation of the park facilities was unconstitutional. Rather than integrating, the city closed the park and the rink permanently; the pool was converted into a "Marineland" with three sea lions. In 1973, the South Carolina State Fair fully integrated.

=== Newman v. Piggie Park Enterprises, Inc. (1968) ===

In 1964, Piggie Park Enterprises, also known as Maurice's BBQ, denied an African American woman access to the restaurant. Her lawyer, Matthew J. Perry, filed a suit against the business, citing a violation of the newly enacted Civil Rights Act of 1964. The restaurant's owner, Maurice Bessinger, argued that restaurant was not a public accommodation was therefore not subject to the legislation. Bessinger, a Baptist, believed God created whites to be superior to blacks, and that "his religious beliefs compel him to oppose any integration of the races whatever." In the case Newman v. Piggie Park Enterprises, Inc., a lower court ruled in favor of Bessinger, but the Court of Appeals for the Fourth Circuit reversed the decision; Bessinger appealed to the Supreme Court. The Supreme Court ruled 8–0 that Bessinger had violated the civil rights of the black customer and that he was not entitled to be compensated for the money he spent on the appeal to the Supreme Court.

== 1969 Charleston hospital strike ==
On March 17, 1969, a group of 300 African-American women healthcare workers at the Medical University of South Carolina in Charleston protested unequal pay and unsafe working conditions. Coretta Scott King, the widowed wife of Martin Luther King Jr., was among the protesting women, and this was the Southern Christian Leadership Conference's first major campaign since King's assassination. Several women took control of the hospital president's office while singing hymns and chanting. Most women returned to their jobs once Police Chief John Conroy threatened to arrest the protesters, but twelve women were fired for abandoning their patients. After the firing of the twelve women, many more employees, predominantly women, went on strike. The strike lasted over 100 days, and in late April, National Guard troops with tanks, gas masks, and bayonet-fixed rifles arrive to confront the healthcare workers. The strike ended, without violence, in June with a settlement.

== Opposition ==
In 1956, U.S. Senator Strom Thurmond of South Carolina authored the Southern Manifesto, which denounced the 1954 Brown v. Board decision as "unwarranted" and referred to anti-segregationists as "agitators and troublemakers invading our States". Many schools and districts, consequentially, refused to integrate as mandated by the Supreme Court. The manifesto encouraged white flight, school choice, and the voluntary closing of public schools. Governor Fritz Hollings (1959–1963), initially opposed integration but reversed his position midway through his gubernatorial term. Hollings advocated for school integration "with dignity", and he stated that the age of segregation had passed. Hollings was the first governor of South Carolina to support integration since the Reconstruction era in the 1870s.

The Virginia battle flag, commonly referred to as the Confederate flag, was raised over the SC State House in 1962 during the civil rights movement

In 1962, the South Carolina General Assembly voted to display the Virginia battle flag on top of the State House dome. The flag flew on the dome until 2000, where it was moved to a monument on the capitol grounds. The flag was removed from the grounds in 2015 after the Charleston church shooting.

After the passage of the federal Voting Rights Act of 1965, the state of South Carolina argued that the act was unconstitutional and that states reserved the right to regulate and control elections. In the Supreme Court decision of South Carolina v. Katzenbach (1966), Justice Earl Warren authored in the majority opinion that preventing racial discrimination was a "legitimate response" of Congress and that South Carolina's intentions were generated from "insidious and pervasive evil".

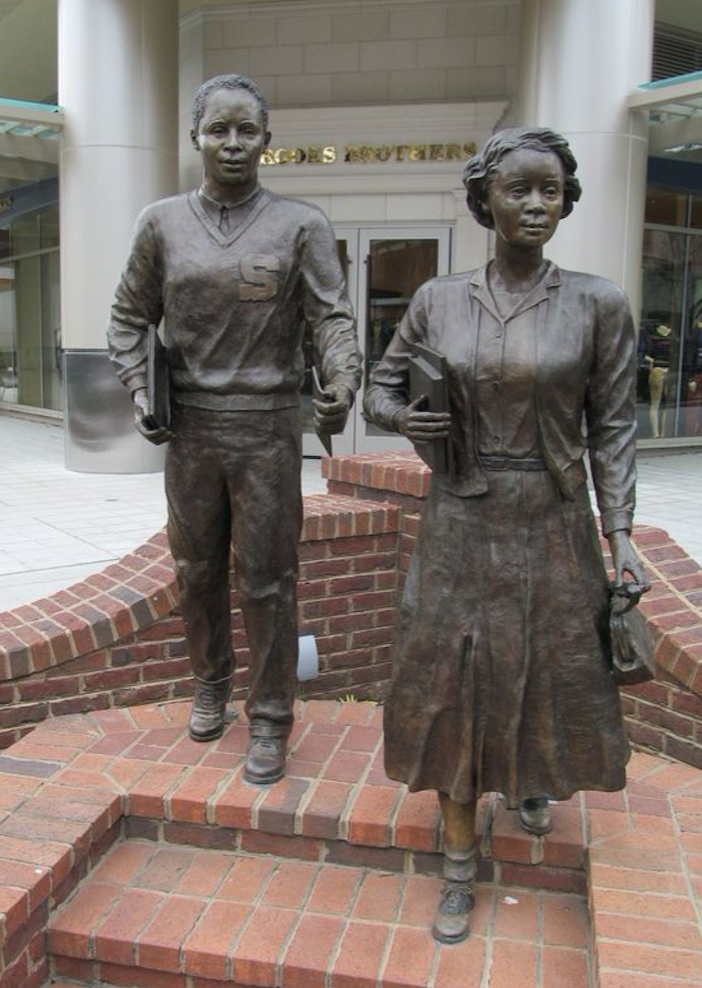
A statue of the high school students at Sterling High that protested segregation laws during the civil rights movement in Greenville, SC

In 1967 Sterling High School, an all-black school in Greenville, was destroyed by fire. Many believed that the fire was intentional, especially since the same week the school had approved for renovations, but this claim was never proven. Throughout the early 1960s, students at Sterling protested unequal treatment in Greenville, especially at F. W. Woolworth's, through nonviolent protests and sit-ins. In 2006 a memorial to these students was constructed in Greenville on the location of the former Woolworth's.

On January 25, 1972, the Springfield Baptist Church in Greenville, a black church, was burned in opposition to African-American equality. The church, founded by former slaves in 1867, was one of few places African Americans could safely visit during the era of Jim Crow. The church had been a site for many speakers and leaders, including Martin Luther King Jr. and Jesse Jackson. The church had been a location for many NAACP meetings during the civil rights movement, and it had been where many peaceful protests were planned, including the New Year's Day March that resulted in the desegregation of Greenville's Downtown Airport.

== National leaders ==
On April 17, 1963, Malcolm X delivered a speech at a mosque in Columbia, denouncing the political leaders. On April 25, 1963, U.S. Attorney General Robert F. Kennedy, brother to President John F. Kennedy, spoke at the University of South Carolina, stating that "the practical needs of the world today would compel our national government...to do everything possible to eliminate racial discrimination." In 1967, Martin Luther King Jr. gave a speech in Charleston where he encouraged African Americans to vote and protest racial inequality.

Notable leaders include:

- Modjeska Monteith Simkins
- Isaiah DeQuincey Newman
- Matthew J. Perry
- Septima Poinsette Clark
- Jesse Jackson
- Charlayne Hunter-Gault
- Leola C. Robinson-Simpson

== National Register of Historic Places in South Carolina with connections to the Civil Rights Movement ==
- Allen University Historic District - Richland County
- Benedict College Historic District - Richland County
- Modjeska Monteith Simkins House - Richland County
- Dr. Cyril O. Spann Medical Office - Richland County
- Waverly Historic District - Richland County
- Summerton High School - Clarendon County
- All Star Triangle Bowl - Orangeburg County
- Claflin College Historic District - Orangeburg County
- South Carolina State College Historic District - Orangeburg County

== Legacy ==
The passage of the federal Voting Rights Act of 1965 led to the creation of the Legislative Black Caucus in the South Carolina legislature. For the first time since the Reconstruction era, African Americans were elected to statewide political offices in South Carolina. As of 2020, 44 of 172 members of the South Carolina General Assembly were African American, accounting for about 26%.

== See also ==
- History of South Carolina
- African Americans in South Carolina
- Economy of South Carolina
