= John Hinton =

John Hinton may refer to:

- Jack Hinton (John Daniel Hinton, 1909–1997), New Zealand soldier awarded the Victoria Cross
- John Hinton (rugby) (1860–1931), Wales international rugby union player
- John Hinton (baseball) (1876–1920), American baseball player
- John Hinton (footballer), English footballer active in the 1910s and 1920s
- John Hinton (priest), Archdeacon of Ossory from 1700 to 1713
- John Hinton (Dean of Tuam) (1672–1743), Anglican priest in Ireland
- John Howard Hinton (1791–1873), English author and Baptist minister
- J. M. Hinton (John Michael Hinton, 1923–2000), British philosopher
