= Allen University Historic District =

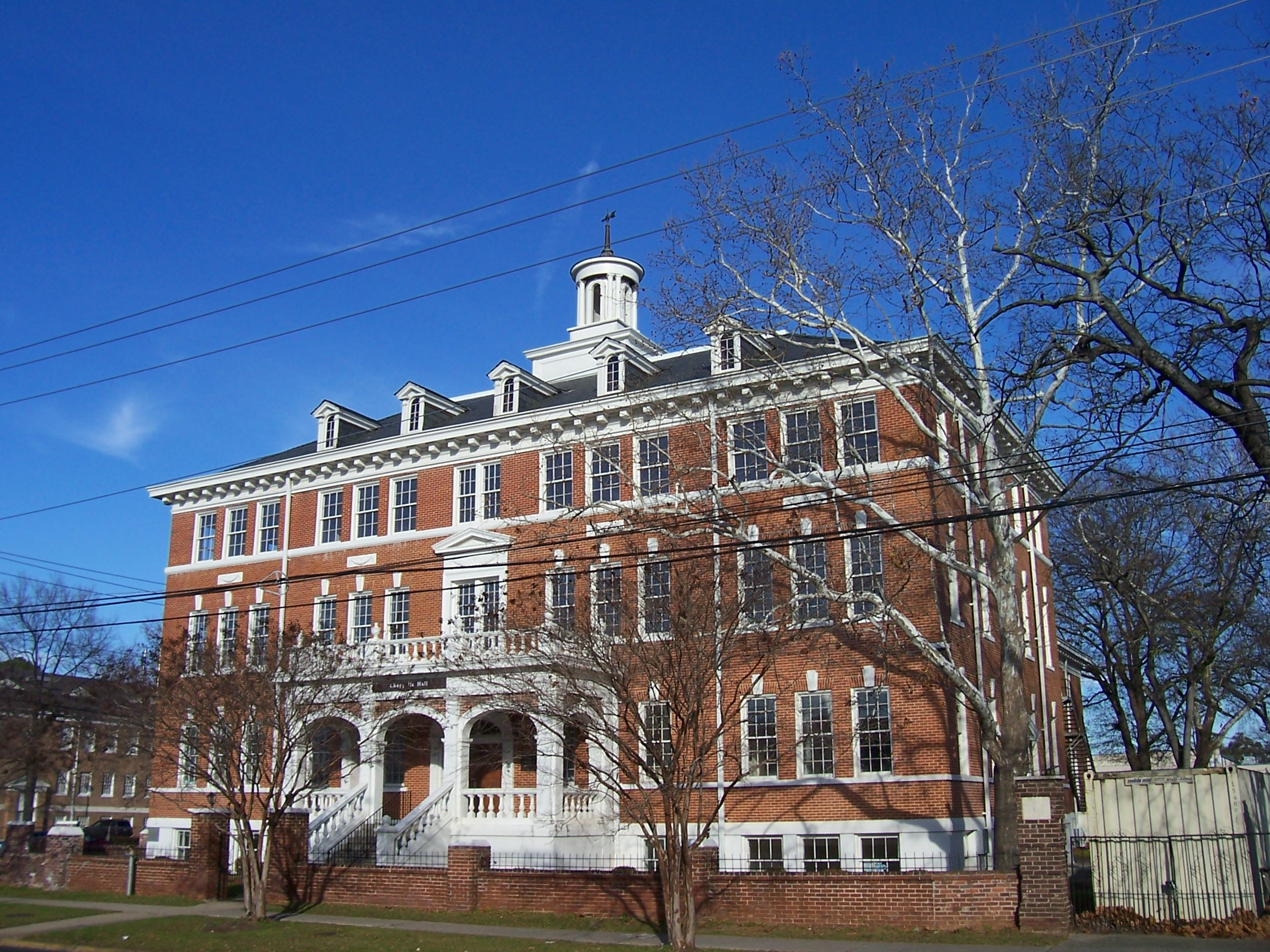
Chappelle Administration Building

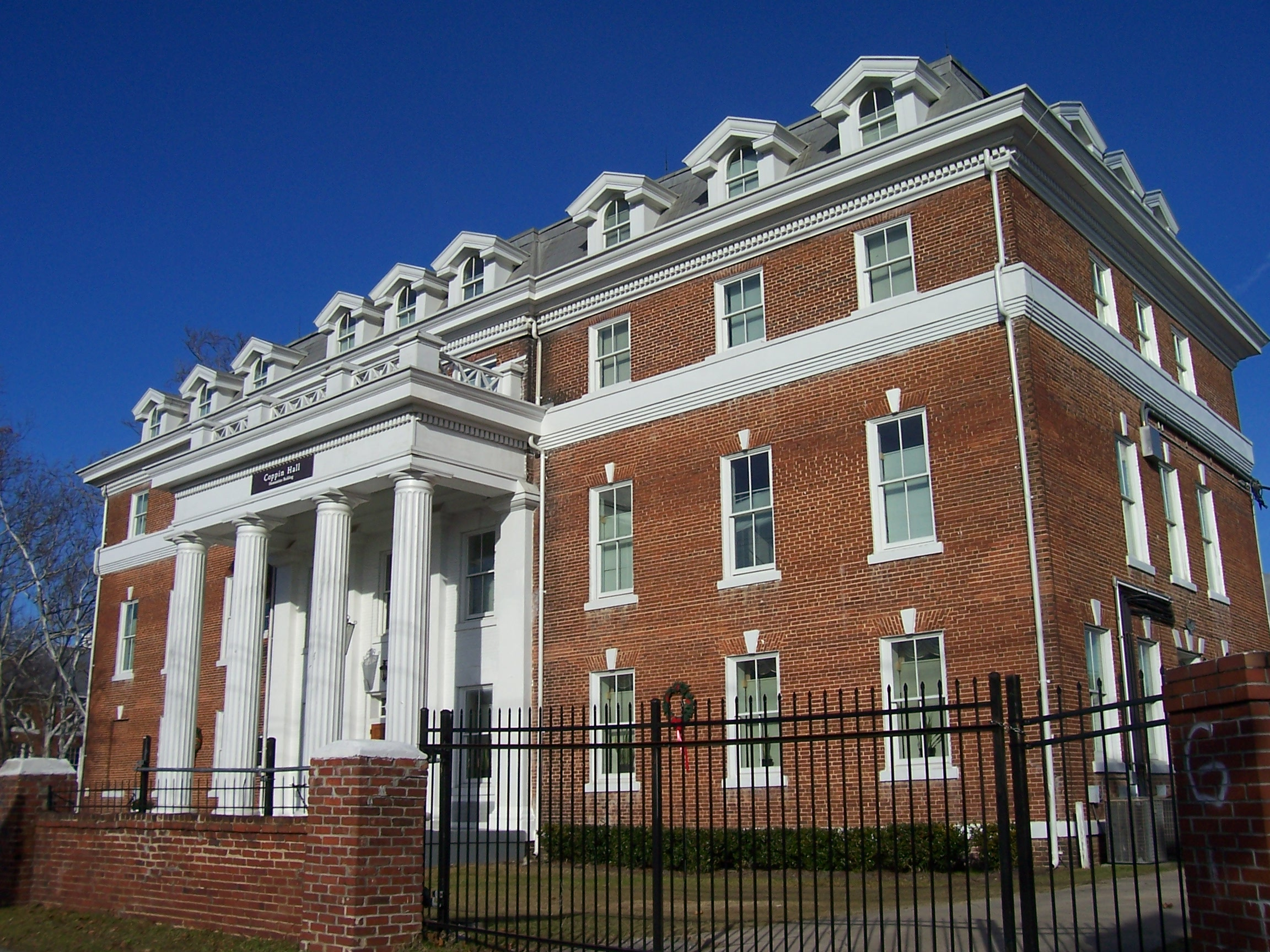
Levi J. Coppin Hall

Allen University Historic District is a historic district in Columbia, South Carolina that includes buildings on the campus of Allen University, originally established as Payne Institute. Buildings in the district include Arnett Hall, the Chappelle Administration Building (itself listed individually as a National Landmark designed by John Anderson Lankford), Coppin Hall, the Joseph Simon Flippen Library, and the Canteen Building. The district was listed on the National Register of Historic Places April 14, 1975. The address is 1530 Harden Street. Originally in a suburb, the university is now near downtown.

In addition to its National Register of Historic Places status, Allen University Historic District falls within the boundaries of Waverly Protection Area, a Preservation District within the City of Columbia Urban Design and Historic Preservation District system.

The school was named for Richard Allen who founded the African Methodist Episcopal Church (A.M.E. Church). The university was one of several universities established by the A.M.E. Church in the South after the American Civil War and opened four years after the University of South Carolina officially excluded African Americans. Property in Columbia was purchased in 1881 and the first major building constructed in 1888. The district features four main buildings that were completed from 1891 to 1941 around the campus green. The architecture includes red brick construction, white columns, and classical elements.

== See also ==
- National Register of Historic Places listings in Columbia, South Carolina
- List of National Historic Landmarks in South Carolina
- Waverly Historic District
