= Visanska-Starks House =

Coordinates: 34°00′37″N 81°01′06″W

The Visanska-Starks House and Carriage House, built in 1900, is an example of the social history of Columbia, South Carolina's first suburb: Waverly Historic District. The history of the house includes Antebellum white, Jewish, and African-American inhabitants over several decades, and is named for Barrett Visanska and John J. Starks.

== Antebellum White inhabitants ==
The land on which the Visanska-Starks House sits was previously owned by Mrs. Bessie Springs Childs, daughter of the family that founded Springs Industries in Fort Mill, SC (now Springs Global); wife of Capt. Lysander D. Childs, a banker and legislator; sister-in-law of William G. Childs, President of the Columbia, Newberry and Laurens Railroad, and daughter-in-law of Colonel Lysander D. Childs. Childs, a South Carolina pre-Civil War industrialist, was ancestor to William C. Westmoreland, the US Army General who commanded military operations during the peak of the Vietnam War.

Mrs. Childs sold the land to Caroline Weston Arthur, daughter of planter and physician Dr. William Weston IV of Grovewood in Lower Richland County. Through her father, Caroline's distant relatives included state legislators Joel Adams, William Weston Adams, South Carolina Governor James Hopkins Adams, and diplomat Weston Adams. Caroline was the widow of William Lindsley Arthur, whose family land would later become Arthurtown.

== Jewish inhabitants ==
See also: Jews in the Southern United States

Mrs. Arthur built the home in 1900. In 1913, she sold the house to Barrett Visanska, a Polish immigrant, jeweler and watchmaker by trade. Through his wife Rachel Trager, Visanska's distant relatives included Esther Gottesman and David Gottesman.

During this time, Waverly was home to black and white residents, and the Visanskas enjoyed friendships with such neighbors as funeral home owner Willis Johnson. Visanska was a founder of the Tree of Life Congregation in Columbia, later serving as its first vice president and president. His niece was Sarah Visanska, a founder and first president of the Charleston section of the National Council of Jewish Women. His son Morton Visanska, also a Tree of Life President, was a founder of Town Theatre, the oldest community theatre building in continuous use in the United States. The Visanska house was full of music; mother Rachel was a pianist, son Daniel played the violin professionally in several orchestras in Europe. Florence and Morton were musicians, and child prodigy Bertha attended the National Conservatory of Music of America, directed by Czech composer Antonin Dvorak. Daniel Visanska served as concertmaster for the Conservatory.

Visanska grandson Herbert Goodkind, lived in the house for a time with his parents, Walter and Annie Visanska Goodkind. Herbert was deeply influenced by his Uncle Dan, and grew to love music, especially the violin. He later wrote “Violin Iconography by Antonio Stradivari”, a definitive work on this master violin maker, and was a founder of the Violin Society of America. Oberlin College holds the Violin Society of America/Herbert K. Goodkind Collection, noted by master violinist Itzhak Perlman as the “most significant single collection of literature in the world about the making, playing and teaching of stringed instruments.”

== African American inhabitants ==
See also: African Americans in South Carolina

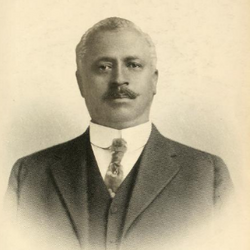
John J. Starks, President of Benedict College, 1930-1944

The home became the residence of the Rev. Dr. and Mrs. John J. Starks during their administration as first Black president and first lady of Benedict College (1930-1944). Prior to this, Dr. Starks served as President of Morris College in Sumter (1912-1930), and Seneca Institute in Oconee County (1899-1912). The house later became a nurses home for Good Samaritan-Waverly Hospital, fitting Mrs. Julia Stark's desire that the house serve the community.

== Historic significance and recognition ==
Waverly Historic District, bounded by Gervais, Harden and Taylor Streets and Millwood Avenue, was listed in the National Register for Historic Places in 1989. The Visanska Starks House is a non-contributing property in the NRHP District, but is included in the City of Columbia Waverly Protection Area.

The Visanska Starks House received a historic marker from the South Carolina Department of Archives and History in 2007. Sponsored by the Richland County Conservation Commission, this state historic marker is the first erected in the District.

The House and its carriage house were recognized in the Congressional Record by James Clyburn for being featured on the HGTV show "If Walls Could Talk" during Waverly's Centennial.

At the 2019 historical marker unveiling at the Dr. Cyril O. Spann Medical Office in Columbia, South Carolina, a planting and dedication ceremony for a Tree of Peace and Resistance held that day in conjunction with the Visanska Starks House recognized actions of mutual support between members of Emanual African Methodist Episcopal Church who had experienced the Charleston Church shooting and members of Tree of Life _ Or L'Simcha Congregation after the Pittsburgh synagogue shooting. The event expressed a commitment to public health and non-violence, and observed historic ties between the Spann Medical Office, the Visanska Starks House and Good Samaritan Waverly Hospital.

== Bibliography ==
- Bell, Louise Matheson, Seneca: Visions of Yesterday, 2003.
- Childs family papers, 1850-1881 and 1991, South Caroliniana Library, University of South Carolina, Columbia.
- Davis, Marianna W. The Enduring Dream: History of Benedict College, 1870-1995. 1995.
- Gergel, Belinda and Richard Gergel. In the Pursuit of the Tree of Life: A History of the Early Jews of Columbia, South Carolina and the Tree of Life Congregation.
- Goodkind, Herbert K. Violin Iconography of Antonio Stradivari, 1644-1737: Treatises on the Life and Work of the Patriarch of the Violinmakers. Larchmont, NY: published by the author, 1972
- Hemmingway, Theodore. Prelude to Change: Black Carolinians in the War Years, 1914-1920 The Journal of Negro History, Vol. 65, No. 3 (Summer, 1980), pp. 212-227 Published by: Association for the Study of African-American Life and History, Inc.
- Hopkins, Laura Jervey. Lower Richland Planters: Hopkins, Adams, Weston and Related Families of South Carolina, R. L. Bryan Company, 1976
- Lau, Peter F., Democracy Rising: South Carolina and the Fight for Black Equality Since 1865 University Press of Kentucky, 2006.
- Megginson, W.J., African American Life in South Carolina's Upper Piedmont, 1780-1900 Univ of South Carolina Press, 2006.
- Moore, John Hammond. Columbia and Richland County, University of South Carolina Press, 1992.
- Moore, Winfred B. and Orville Vernon Burton. Toward the Meeting of the Waters: Currents in the Civil Rights Movement of South Carolina During the Twentieth Century. Univ of South Carolina Press, 2008.
- Starks, J. J. Lo These Many Years: An Autobiographical Sketch. Columbia: The State Co., 1941.
