= Charleston sit-ins =

South Carolina peaceful protests in 1960–61

- Part of the Civil Rights Movement in South Carolina
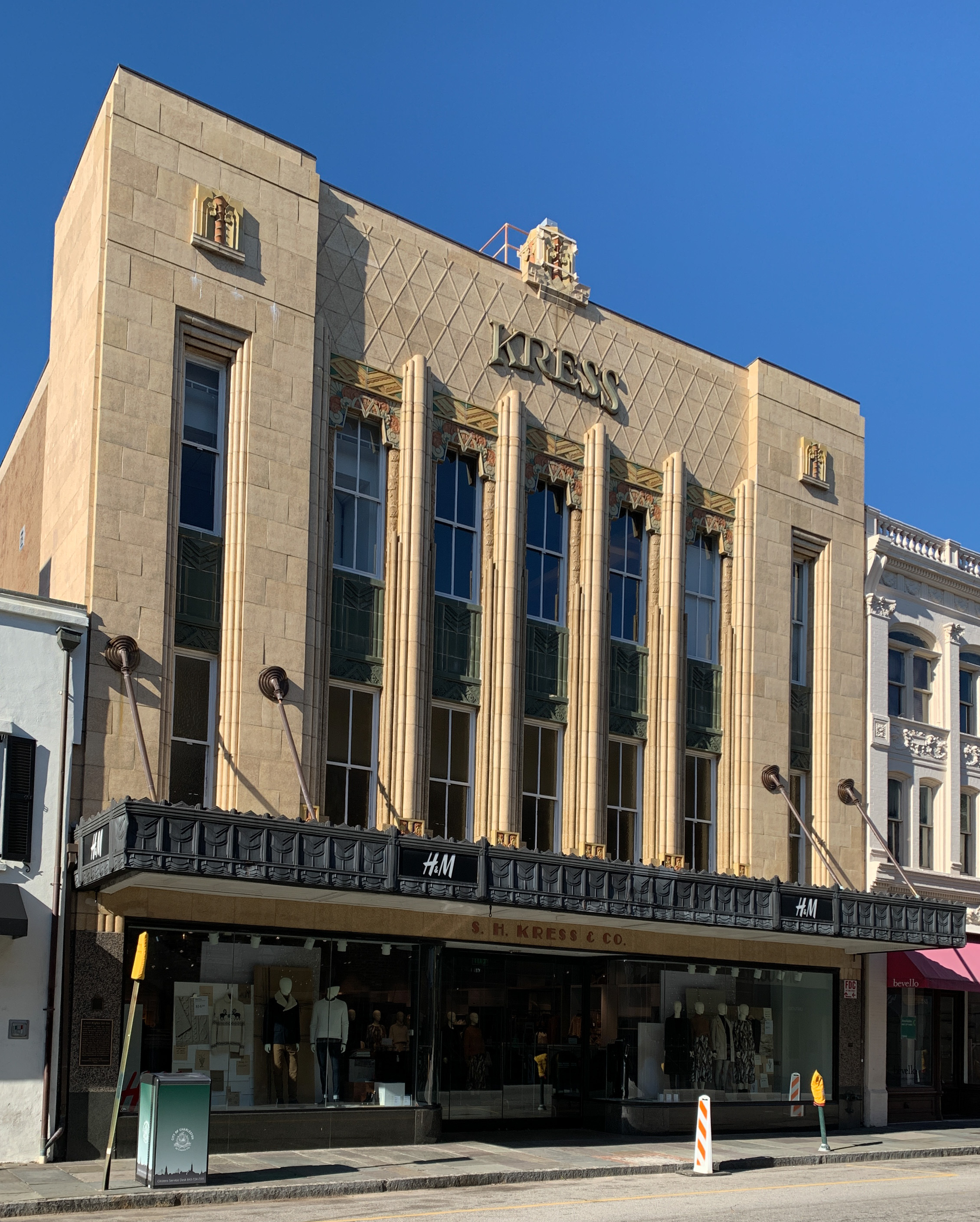
- Date: April 1, 1960
- Location: S.H. Kress lunch counter, 281 King Street, Charleston, South Carolina
- Caused by: Racial segregation in public accommodations

Parties
students	City of Charleston, South Carolina

The Charleston sit-ins were a series of peaceful protests during the sit-in movement of the civil rights movement of the 1960s in Charleston, South Carolina. Unlike at other sit-ins in the South where the protestors were mainly college students, the protestors in Charleston were mainly high school students. The earliest such protest was a sit-in at a lunch counter by Charleston high school students, but similar protests continued thereafter.

== Initial S.H. Kress Sit-in ==
On April 1, 1960, 16 boys and 8 girls from Burke High School arrived at the S.H. Kress store on King Street and sat at a 52-person lunch counter at the back of the store. At 10:45 a.m., the students took consecutive seats at the counter, and they would not leave. During the afternoon, the students hummed songs, recited the Lord's Prayer, and recited the 23rd Psalm. At 4:45 p.m., an anonymous caller phoned in a possible bomb, and the police evacuated the store of about 100 patrons. (After a search, no bomb was found.) The students did not leave, so the police arrested them for trespassing. Each student was given a $10 bond, which J. Arthur Brown of the NAACP paid for them. The students were John Bailey, James Gilbert Blake, Jenniesse Blake, Andrew Brown, Deloris Brown, Minerva Brown, Charles Butler, Mitchell Christopher, Allen Coley, Corelius Fludd, Harvey Gantt, Joseph Gerideau, Kennett Andrew German, Cecile Gordon, Annette Graham, Alfred Hamilton, Caroline Jenkins, Francis Johnson, Joseph Jones, Alvin Delford Latten, Verna Jean McNeil, David Paul Richardson, Arthuree Singleton, and Fred Smalls.

== Public Reaction ==
The Charleston newspaper responded with a strong editorial against the demonstration:

City police did not wish to arrest the students, though their mumbo-jumbo antics in quoting prayer and scripture were calculated to disturb the normal business of a reputable concern. When the students refused to move on closing of the store, the police were forced to make the arrests for which the students had come in the first place.

We are confident that sober, respectable citizens of both races are embarrassed at the deliberate dramatizing of racial division which in the past has been accepted by consent. In refusing to abide by customs that have preserved general peace and harmony, the students here and elsewhere are forcing the public to set up a new set of customs.

== Subsequent activities ==
Lunch counter sit-ins continued. On July 25, 1960, 11 Black students were refused service at the W.T. Grant lunch counter at 374 King Street. On July 26, 1960, about 20 students arrived at the F.W. Woolworth Co. lunch counter, but they were refused service; the store removed the stools are the counter and replaced them only when a White patron arrived to provide a seat. On some days, there were no sit-ins, but students picketed business or demonstrated. Protests continued into 1961 when nine students were arrested in February 1961 and fined $75 or 30 days in jail. On February 11, 1961, 14 students from Burke High School, Immaculate Conception High School, and Bonds-Wilson High School were charged with trespassing when they refused to leave the lunch counter at the Kress store on King Street. The NAACP paid the bonds for nine of the students; four younger protestors were released to their parents' custody.

== See also ==
- African Americans in South Carolina
