= J. M. Hinton =

J. M. Hinton may refer to:

- James Myles Hinton (1891–1970), American businessperson, civil rights activist, and minister
- J. M. Hinton (philosopher) (1923–2000), British philosopher
