= Waverly Historic District (Columbia, South Carolina) =

Historic district in South Carolina, United States

- U.S. National Register of Historic Places
- U.S. Historic district
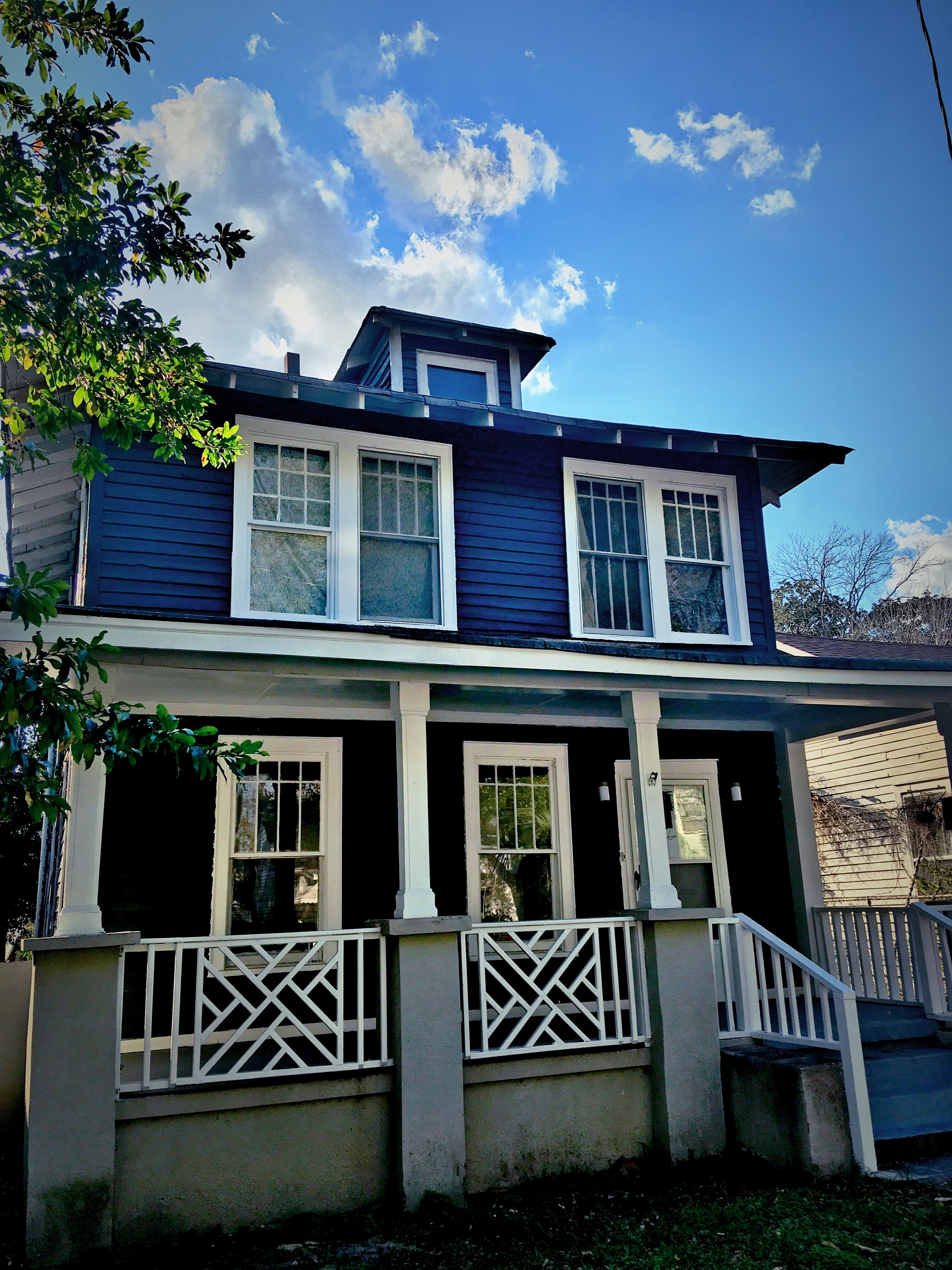

- Location within South Carolina Location within the United States
- Location: Roughly bounded by Hampton St., Heidt St., Gervais St., and Harden St., Columbia, South Carolina
- Coordinates: 34°00′33″N 81°01′03″W
- Area: 33 acres (13 ha)
- Architect: John Anderson Lankford, Charles Coker Wilson
- Architectural style: Late 19th And Early 20th Century American Movements, Late 19th And 20th Century Revivals
- NRHP reference No.: 89002154
- Added to NRHP: December 21, 1989

Waverly Historic District is a national historic district located at Columbia, South Carolina. The district encompasses 132 contributing buildings in the first suburban development at Columbia. They were built between about 1898 and 1925, and the district includes examples of Queen Anne, Colonial Revival, Neoclassical, shotgun, American Foursquare, and Craftsman/Bungalow style architecture. The community has evolved from a predominantly white neighborhood into a community of African-American artisans, professionals and social reformers.

It was added to the National Register of Historic Places in 1989. It was added to the National Park Service African American Civil Rights Network in February 2021.

Waverly Historic District is also recognized by the City of Columbia as a Preservation District known as Waverly Protection Area, bounded by Gervais Street, Harden Street, Taylor Street and Millwood Avenue. In addition to Waverly Historic District itself, the following sites within the Waverly Protection Area are listed individually on the National Register of Historic Places: Good Samaritan Waverly Hospital, Dr. Cyril O. Spann Medical Office, Allen University Historic District, Chappelle Administration Building, Ruth's Beauty Parlor (which was housed in a circa 1910 Sears house, model No. 118, ordered by Ruth's father, Nathanial H. Collins), and Woodrow Memorial Presbyterian Church.

Historical markers in the Waverly Protection Area conferred by the South Carolina Department of Archives and History include: Allen University, Dr. Cyril O. Spann Medical Office, Visanska Starks House, Good Samaritan Waverly Hospital, First Calvary Baptist Church, Waverly, Matthew J. Perry House, Heidt-Russell House/Edwin R. Russell (one of the African-American scientists and technicians on the Manhattan Project), James M. Hinton House, Waverly Five and Dime/George Elmore and Elmore v. Rice (a ruling by federal judge Julius Waties Waring).
