= Woodrow Memorial Presbyterian Church =

Historic church in South Carolina, United States

- U.S. National Register of Historic Places
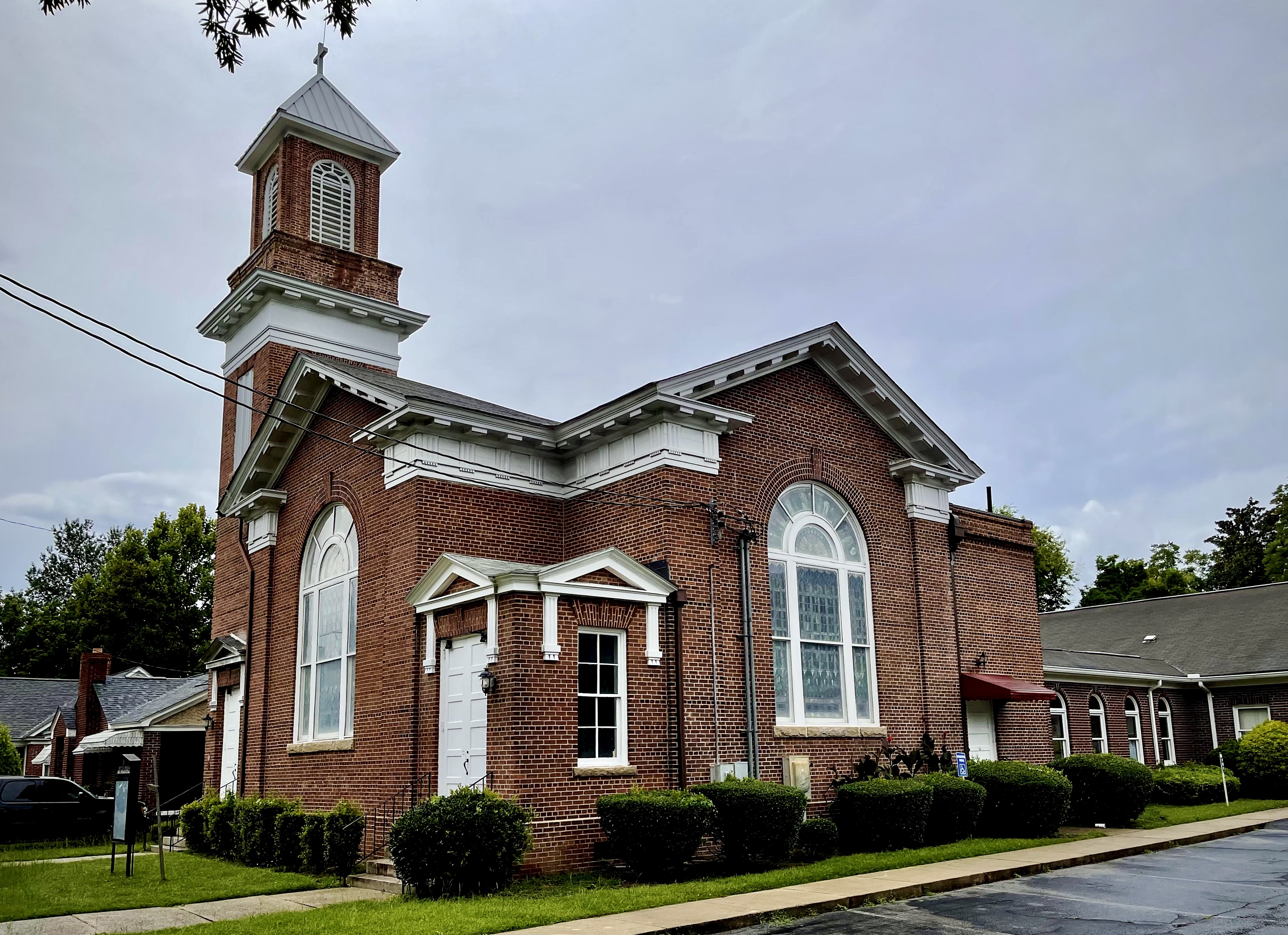

- Location within South Carolina Location within the United States
- Location: 2221 Washington St., Columbia, South Carolina
- Coordinates: 34°0′34″N 81°1′5″W
- Area: 0.2 acres (0.081 ha)
- Built: 1885
- MPS: Columbia MRA
- NRHP reference No.: 79003366
- Added to NRHP: March 2, 1979

Woodrow Memorial Presbyterian Church (also known as Bishop's Memorial A.M.E. Church) is a historic church in Columbia, South Carolina.

The church was built in 1885 and added to the National Register of Historic Places in 1979. In addition to its National Register of Historic Places status, it falls within the boundaries of Waverly Protection Area, a Preservation District within the City of Columbia Urban Design and Historic Preservation District system, as well as in Waverly Historic District.
