= Howard Emery Wright =

Howard Emery Wright (1908–1988) was an African-American social psychologist and educator. He served as President of Allen University, in the U.S. Office of Education, and as Director of the Division of Social Sciences at The Hampton Institute. He studied attitudinal testing.

== Early life ==
Wright was born in 1908 in Philadelphia to William and Evelyn Wright. He attended elementary school in Washington D.C. He was a graduate of Atlantic City High School in New Jersey.

== Undergraduate and graduate years ==
Wright received a bachelor's degree from Lincoln University in Pennsylvania in 1932. He received a master's degree from Ohio State University in 1933, with a thesis on attitudinal testing. He received a PhD in psychology at Ohio State University in 1946.

== Careers ==
Wright became principal of the Campus Laboratory School at Albany State College in Georgia at age twenty five until 1934. He was principal at Aracoma High School in West Virginia (1936 to 1939). At the Campus Laboratory School at Prairie View College in Texas he was principal from 1940 to 1945, where he also held positions as associate professor of education and director of teacher training. He was teacher assistant at Ohio State University. At North Carolina College in Durham he was chairman in the psychology department (1945–1948). When he left there he became chairman of education at Southern University until 1953. He became president of Allen University in South Carolina in 1961. In Washington, D.C. wright became regional director of Community Action Programs for the Office of Opportunity, and branch chief of a division of the U.S. Office of Education. He was dean at Maryland State College in 1967. In 1972, Wright became the Director of the Division of Social Sciences at The Hampton Institute.

== Membership ==
Wright was a board member of the Home for Dependent Children, Child Guidance Clinic, Advisory committee to Civil rights, and Vice president of Victory Savings Bank.
