= George Harold =

American football player (born 1942)

No. 42, 21, 18
- Position: Defensive back

Personal information
- Born: April 13, 1942 (age 84); Augusta, Georgia, U.S.
- Listed height: 6 ft 3 in (1.91 m)
- Listed weight: 194 lb (88 kg)

Career information
- High school: Laney (Augusta)
- College: Allen (1961–1964)
- NFL draft: 1965: 10th round, 140th overall pick

Career history
- Baltimore Colts (1966–1967); Pottstown Firebirds (1968); Washington Redskins (1968); Pottstown/Pennsylvania Firebirds (1969–1970)

Career NFL statistics
- Fumble recoveries: 1
- Stats at Pro Football Reference

George Alton Harold (born April 13, 1942) is an American former professional football player who was a defensive back in the National Football League (NFL) for the Baltimore Colts and the Washington Redskins. He played college football for the Allen Yellow Jackets and was selected 140th overall in the 10th round of the 1965 NFL draft.
