= James Hinton =

James Hinton may refer to:

- James Hinton (musician) (born 1988), American musician known as The Range
- James Hinton (surgeon) (1822–1875), English surgeon and author
- James E. Hinton (c. 1937–2006), American cinematographer
- James Myles Hinton (1891–1970), African American businessperson, civil rights leader
- James Sidney Hinton (1834–1892), American politician and Indiana legislator, first African American in that role
- George Barlow (English poet) (1847 – c. 1913), English poet, who sometimes wrote under the pseudonym James Hinton

== See also ==
- James Hinton House, Missouri
