= John Hinton (footballer) =

English footballer (1892–1955)

Personal information
- Full name: Ernest John Hinton
- Date of birth: 28 February 1892
- Place of birth: Southampton, England
- Date of death: 3 December 1955 (aged 63)
- Place of death: Southampton, England
- Height: 5 ft 10 in (1.78 m)
- Position: Inside forward

Senior career*
Years	Team	Apps	(Gls)
- Sholing Athletic
1912–1915	Southampton	2	(0)
1915–1919	RAF Farnborough		
1919–1921	Thornycrofts		
1921	Barnstaple Town		
1921–1922	Exeter City	4	(1)
1922–19??	Thornycrofts		
- * Club domestic league appearances and goals

Ernest John Hinton (28 February 1892 – 3 December 1955) was an English professional footballer who played at inside left for Southampton in the Southern League in 1915 and for Exeter City in the Football League Third Division in 1921.

== Early years ==
Hinton was born in Southampton and was playing Hampshire League football with Sholing Athletic when he was spotted by scouts from Southampton of the Southern League. Hinton joined the Saints in 1912 and played in the reserves; in 1913, he scored a hat-trick in a Southern Alliance match.

He made his two first team appearances when he replaced Fred Jones in a 4–3 defeat at Queens Park Rangers on 16 January 1915 and again in a 3–1 defeat at Bristol Rovers on 17 March.

== Military service ==
When all league football was suspended because of the First World War, Hinton joined the Royal Air Force, stationed at Farnborough. He played football for his squadron and was selected to represent "England" in an RAF international match against their Scottish equivalents.

== Post-war career ==
After the war, Hinton worked for Thornycroft shipbuilders at Woolston as a joiner. He captained the works team, coached by another former Southampton player, Jim Angell, when they reached the First Round proper of the FA Cup in January 1920. After victories over Dulwich Hamlet and Sheppey United, Thornycrofts were drawn against Burnley. The match, on 10 January, was played at The Dell and ended in a goalless draw. In the replay three days later, Burnley's pedigree and experience prevailed, winning 5–0, with three goals from James Lindsay.

Hinton left Thornycroft in February 1921 to join Barnstaple Town, moving on a month later to Exeter City of the Football League Third Division. He made four Football League appearances, scoring once, before returning to Thornycrofts the following year.
