= Good Samaritan-Waverly Hospital =

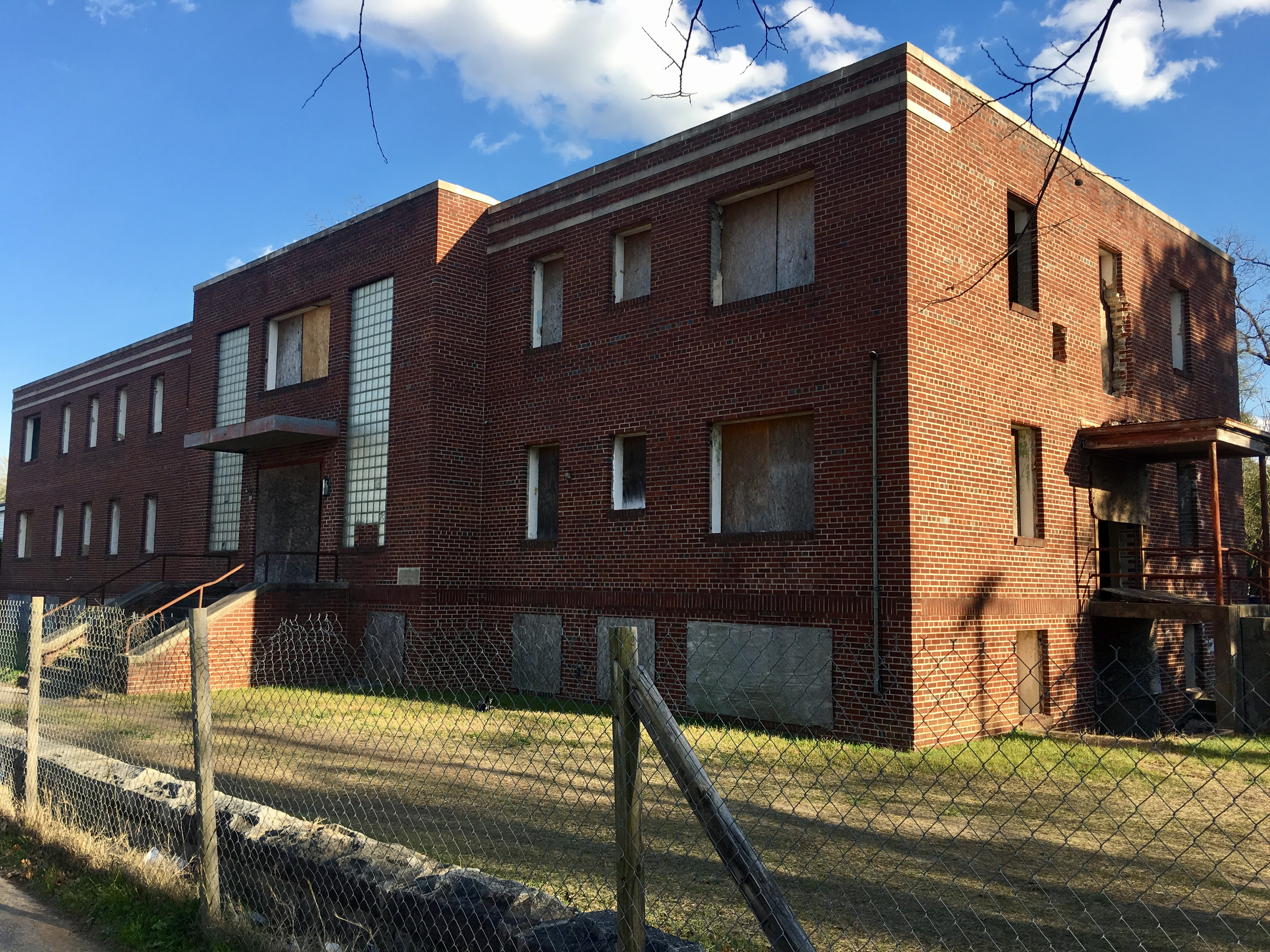
- Dilapidated condition of Good Samaritan Hospital

Geography
- Location: South Carolina, United States

Organization
- Type: General (African Americans)

Services
- Beds: 50

History
- Opened: 1952
- Closed: August 1973

Links
- Lists: Hospitals in South Carolina
- Good Samaritan-Waverly Hospital
- U.S. National Register of Historic Places
- Location within South Carolina Location within the United States
- Location: 2204 Hampton St. Columbia, South Carolina
- Coordinates: 34°0′37″N 81°1′08″W
- Area: less than one acre
- Built: 1952
- Built by: G.C. Shockley Construction Company
- Architectural style: Moderne
- MPS: Segregation in Columbia, South Carolina MPS
- NRHP reference No.: 08000738
- Added to NRHP: July 28, 2008

Good Samaritan-Waverly Hospital, also known as “Good Sam” Hospital and Waverly Hospital, is a historic hospital for African-American patients located in Columbia, South Carolina. It was built in 1952, and is a two-story, brick building in the Moderne style. The hospital housed a pharmacy, laboratory, X-ray room, staff dining room, two operating rooms, and 50 beds to service the local community. The hospital closed in August 1973.

The hospital building was added to the National Register of Historic Places in 2008. In addition to its National Register of Historic Places status, it falls within the boundaries of Waverly Protection Area, a Preservation District within the City of Columbia Urban Design and Historic Preservation District system, as well as Waverly Historic District.

In 2020, Allen University announced that their renovation of the Hospital would include a memorial that will prominently feature the names of Clementa C. Pinckney and the other eight individuals slain at Emanual African Methodist Episcopal Church in 2015. Pinckney was a graduate of Allen University and Pastor at Emanual AME Church. Two other Charleston Church Shooting victims, Tywanza Sanders and Rev. Daniel L. Simmons Sr., were also Allen University graduates.
