= Hinton James =

Hinton James is the name of:

- the first student at the University of North Carolina at Chapel Hill
  - Hinton James Community, part of student housing at the University of North Carolina at Chapel Hill
- Hinton James (politician) (1884–1948), was a U.S. Congressman from North Carolina
