= Chappelle Administration Building =

- Chapelle Administration Building
- U.S. National Register of Historic Places
- U.S. National Historic Landmark
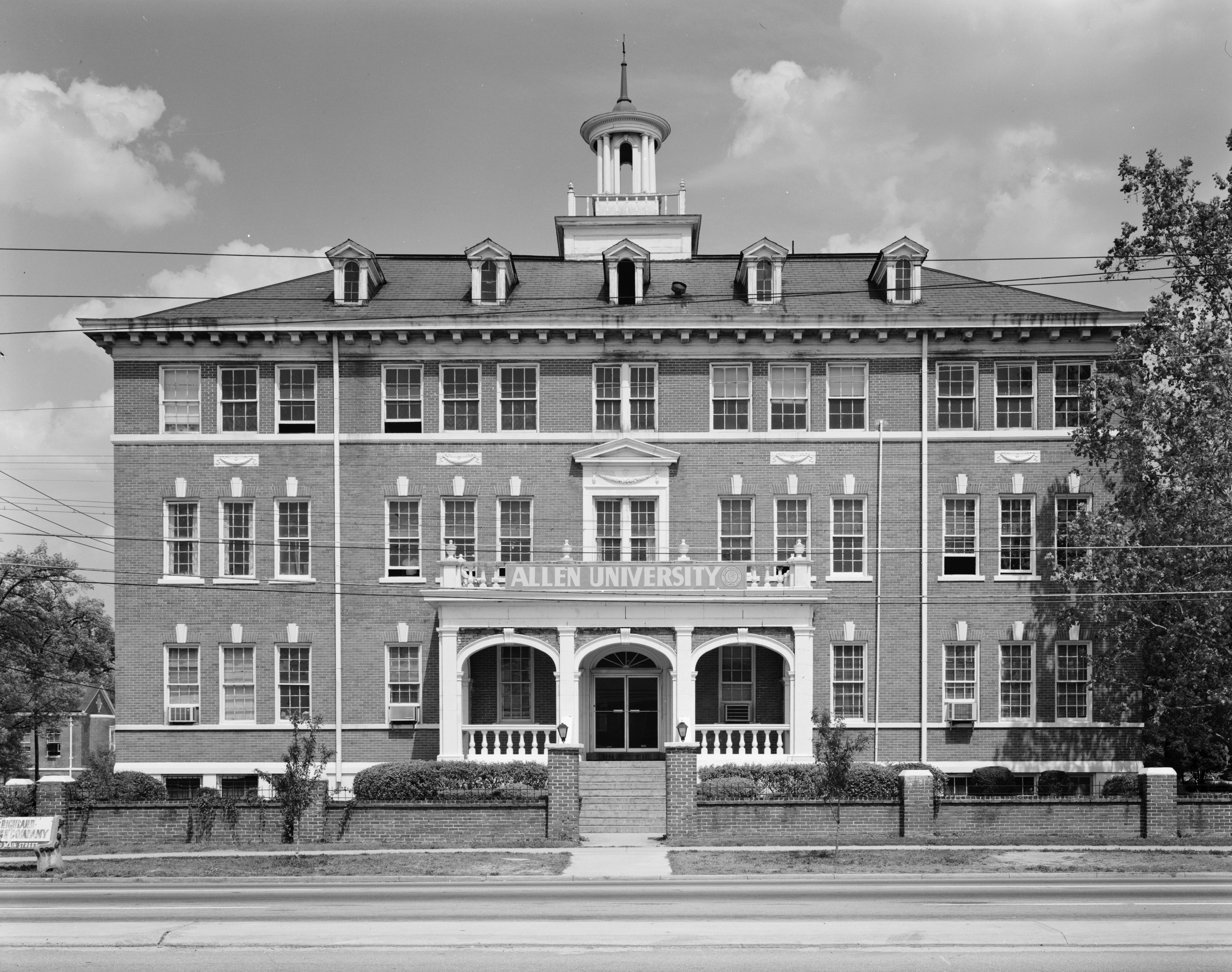
- Chappelle Administration Building

- Location within South Carolina Location within the United States
- Location: 1530 Harden St., Columbia, South Carolina
- Coordinates: 34°0′39.5″N 81°1′15″W
- Built: 1922
- Architect: Lankford, John A.
- Part of: Allen University (ID75001705)
- NRHP reference No.: 76001710

Significant dates
- Added to NRHP: December 8, 1976
- Designated NHL: December 8, 1976

The Chappelle Administration Building, on the campus of Allen University in Columbia, South Carolina, was designed by John Anderson Lankford, known as the "dean of black architects." The building name has been spelled Chapelle Administration Building in Historic American Buildings Survey and National Park Service reports. It was declared a National Historic Landmark in 1976, cited as one Lankford's most important works.

In addition to its National Register of Historic Places status, the Administration Building falls within the boundaries of Waverly Protection Area, a Preservation District within the City of Columbia Urban Design and Historic Preservation District system. This Preservation District is an expansion of Waverly Historic District.

== Description and history ==
The Allen University campus is located northeast of downtown Columbia, centered in a block bounded by Taylor, Harden, Pine, and Hampton Streets. The Chappelle Building is set at the northwestern corner of this block, facing Harden Street. It is a 3 1/2-story masonry structure, built out of red brick with stone trim, and has a slate roof with a reproduction of its original cupola (destroyed by lightning in 1974) on top, and five gabled dormers. The main facade is fourteen bays wide, with a three-arched single-story porch extending across the middle six bays. The porch is topped by a low balustrade, and there is a pedimented entrance to the upper level of the porch on the second floor. Windows on the lower two levels have stone keystones, and there are panels of garlands between the second and third levels.

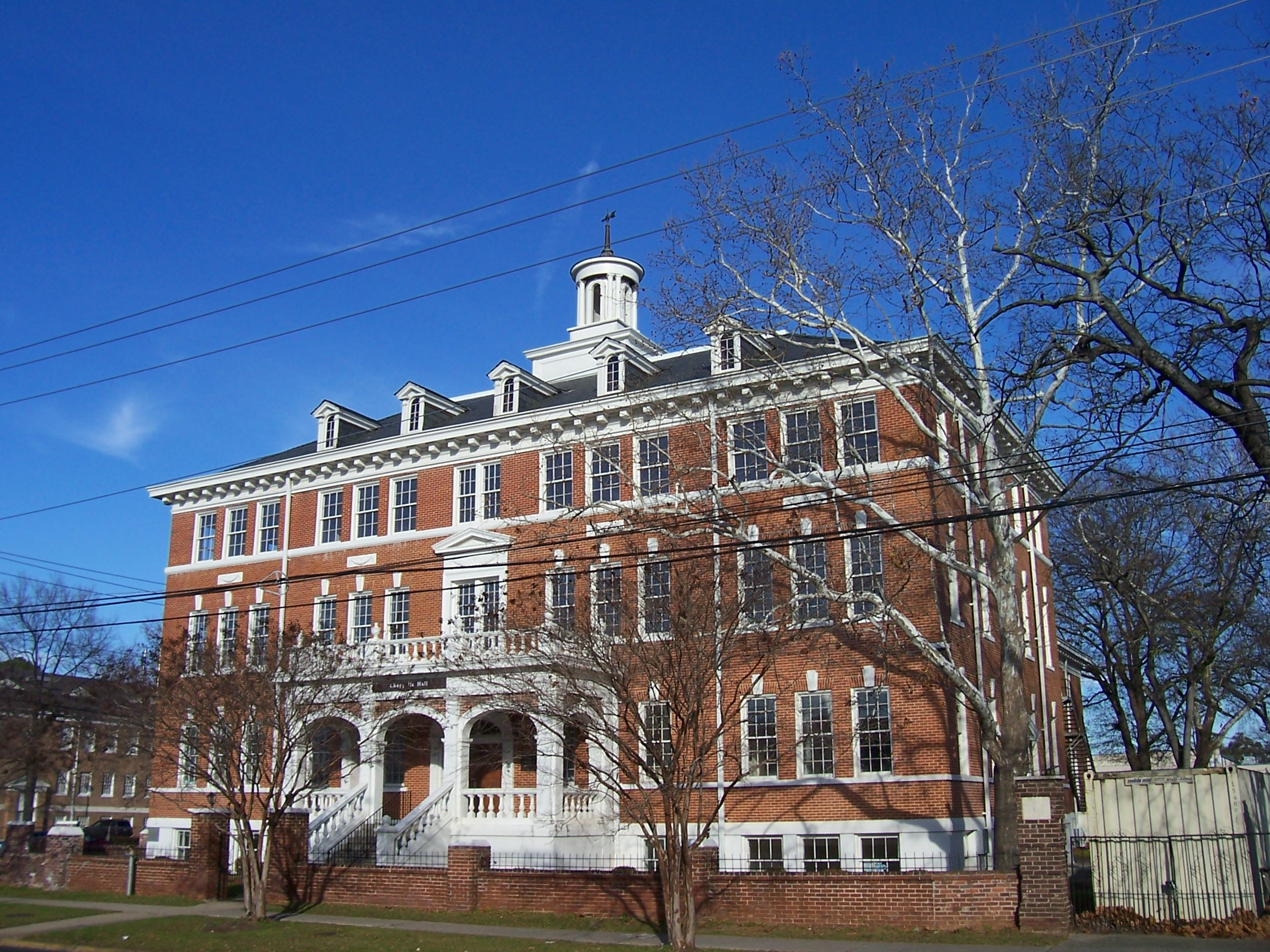
photo c. 2010

Allen University was founded in 1870, and established its campus in Columbia in 1880. This Colonial Revival building, which still plays a prominent role in the campus, was built 1922–25 to a design by John Anderson Lankford (1874–1946) for the then-substantial sum of $165,000. Lankford rose from humble beginnings to earn degrees in mechanical engineering at the Tuskegee Institute. While his training included drafting, it did not include architectural design. At various university positions (mainly with predominantly African-American schools), he was called on to design buildings, eventually leading to his appointment as the chief architect of the African Methodist Episcopal Church (AME) in 1908. The Chappelle Administration Building is one of his major works. The building is named in honour of Bishop William D. Chappelle, who was the university's president from 1898 to 1899.

== See also ==
- List of National Historic Landmarks in South Carolina
- National Register of Historic Places listings in Columbia, South Carolina
- Waverly Historic District
