= Primrose Rupp Hinton =

American journalist (1889-1969)

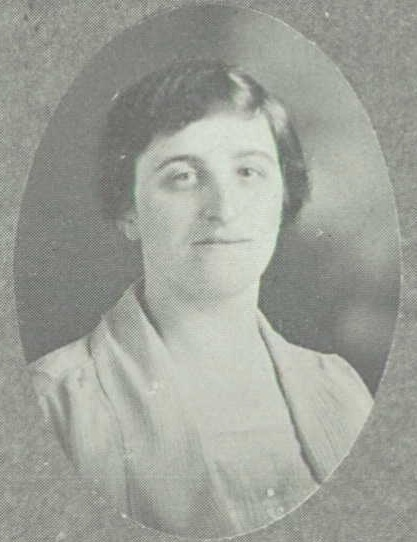
- Born: Syrene Louise Primrose Rupp Hinton; December 25, 1889; Adrian, Michigan
- Died: May 9, 1969 (aged 79)
- Burial place: Fern Hill Cemetery, Aberdeen, Washington
- Other name: Prim Rupp Hinton
- Education: Whitman College
- Known for: Society editor
- Parents: Bernard Henry Rupp (father); Sarah E. Hinman (mother)

Syrene Louise Primrose "Prim" Rupp Hinton (December 25, 1889 – May 9, 1969) was an American journalist. She was the society editor for the Aberdeen Daily World.

== Early life ==
Syrene Louise Primrose "Prim" Rupp Hinton was born on December 25, 1889, in Adrian, Michigan, the daughter of Bernard Henry Rupp (1847-1929) and Sarah E Hinman (1853-1937). The family moved to Walla Walla, Washington, when she was four years old. She went to Sharpstein school for several years and then to Lincoln, from which school she graduated.

She was a graduate of Whitman College.

== Career ==
She was a teacher of English in Weatherwax High School, Aberdeen, Washington.

She was the society editor for the Aberdeen Daily World. Her brother W.A. Rupp was the publisher of the newspaper from 1908 to 1963. Her second husband Foelkner was the publisher from 1963 to 1967.

She was a member of the Grays Harbor Woman's Club.

== Personal life ==
Primrose Rupp Hinton lived at 223 West Fifth Street, Aberdeen, Washington. On June 16, 1920, she married Leonard Arthur Hinton. She later divorced and married Peter Phillip Foelkner (1895-1974) on November 12, 1937. Foelkner was the business manager of the Aberdeen Daily World.

She died on May 9, 1969, and is buried with her second husband at Fern Hill Cemetery, Aberdeen, Washington.
