= John Hinton (priest) =

John Hinton was an Anglican priest in Ireland during the first half of the eighteenth century.

Hinton was born in Chipping Norton and educated at Kilkenny College. He entered Trinity College, Dublin in 1686. He was then admitted to Trinity College, Cambridge in 1689, graduating B.A. in both universities. He then returned to TCD, graduating LL.D. in 1704. He was Archdeacon of Ossory from 1700 to 1713; and Dean of Tuam from 1712 until 1743.
