= John Hinton (Dean of Tuam) =

Anglican priest

John Hinton (1672–1743) was an Anglican priest in Ireland during the 18th century.

Hinton was born in Chipping Norton and educated at Trinity College, Dublin. He was Dean of Tuam from 1716 until his death.
