= John A. Lankford =

American architect (1874–1946)

John Anderson Lankford
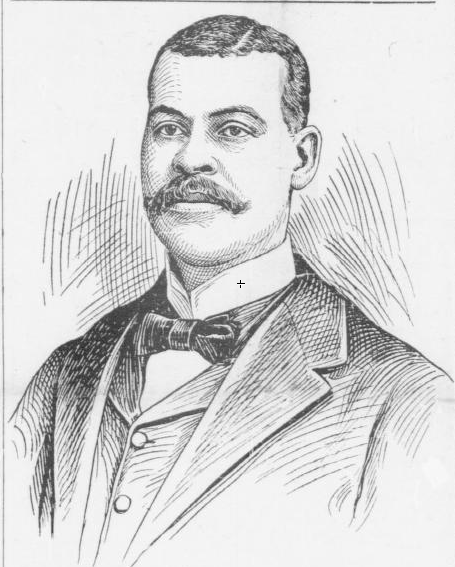
- Born: December 4, 1874; Potosi, Missouri, U.S.
- Died: July 2, 1946 (aged 71); Washington, D.C., U.S.
- Resting place: Lincoln Memorial Cemetery, Suitland, Maryland
- Education: Shaw University; Morris Brown College; Wilberforce University
- Occupation: Architect

John A. Lankford (December 4, 1874 – July 2, 1946), American architect. He was the first professionally licensed African American architect in Virginia in 1922 and in the District of Columbia in 1924. He has been regarded as the "dean of black architecture".

== Life ==
John Lankford was born on a farm near Potosi, Missouri, on December 4, 1874. He attended Lincoln Institute and Tuskegee Institute, historically black colleges. He studied architectural and mechanical drawing from the International Correspondence School. He earned a Bachelor of Science from Shaw University in Raleigh, North Carolina in 1898. He earned Master of Science degrees from Morris Brown College and Wilberforce University.

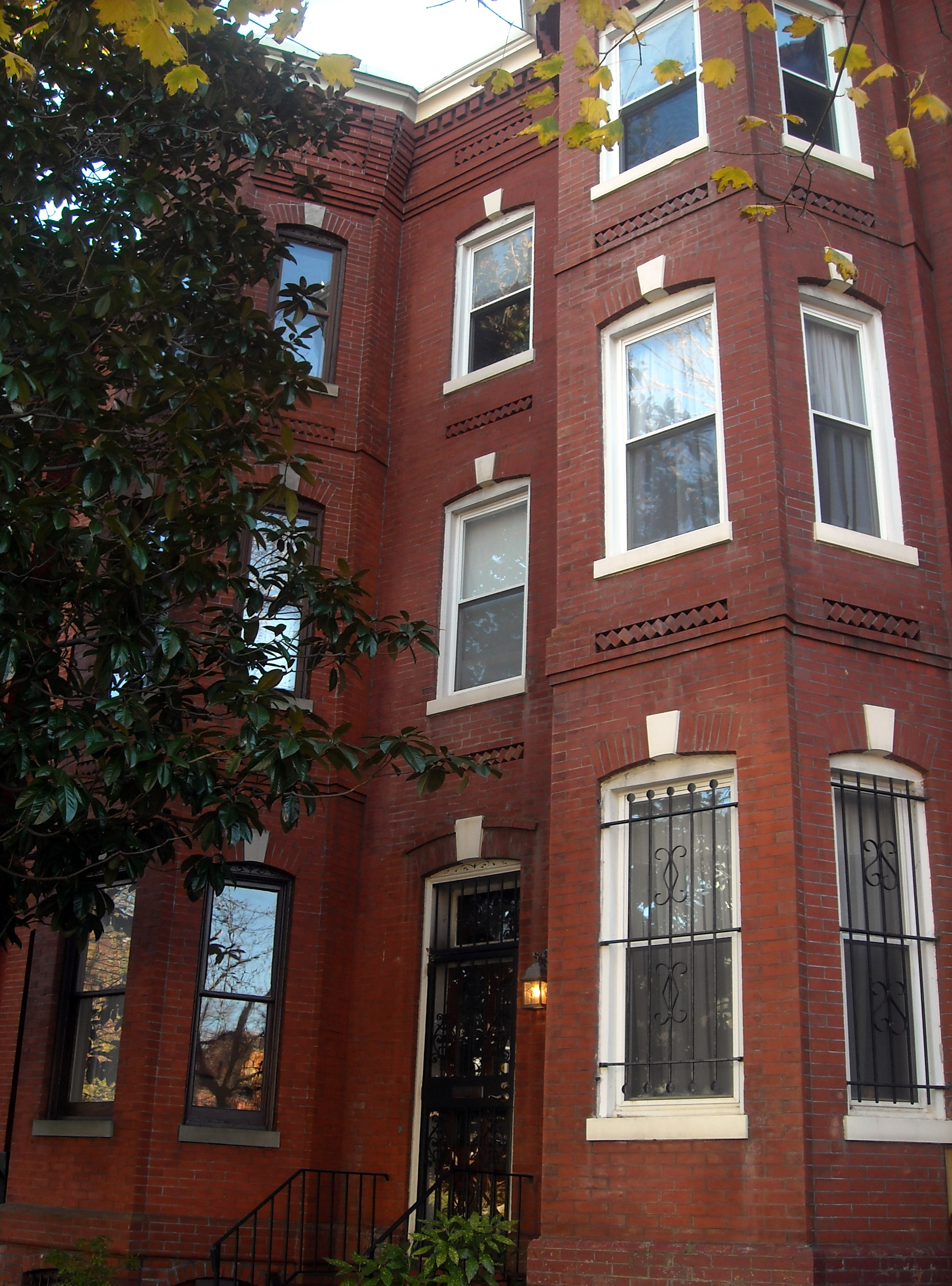
Lankford's former residence in Logan Circle, Washington, D.C.

He married Charlotte Josephine Upshaw in 1901. She was a granddaughter of Henry McNeal Turner, a bishop of the African Methodist Episcopal church, the first independent black denomination founded in the United States.

In 1902, Lankford moved to Washington, D.C., to finish the design of the True Reformer Building. He was appointed supervising architect for the African Methodist Episcopal denomination. He organized the National Negro Business League chapter in Washington, D.C., in 1905, and served as president of the National Technical Association from 1941 to 1942. His Southern Aid Society building in Richmond, Virginia is considered the "first exclusively African American office building in the country, being the result of a collaboration between a black patron, architect, and contractor." Architect Francis Eugene Griffin worked under Lankford in his early career.

He lived and worked at 1448 Q Street, NW, in Washington, D.C.

Lankford died on July 2, 1946, in Washington, D.C., and is buried at Lincoln Memorial Cemetery in Suitland, Maryland.

== Buildings ==
Buildings he designed include:

- Arnett Hall, Wilberforce University
- Big Bethel African Methodist Episcopal Church, Atlanta, Georgia
- Bethel African Methodist Episcopal Church, Columbia, South Carolina
- Chapelle Administration Building (1922) at Allen University, which is a National Historic Landmark
- Haven African Methodist Episcopal Church, Washington, D.C.
- Southern Aid Society building, built 1908, stood at 527 N. 2nd Street, Richmond, Virginia
- True Reformer Building (1903), Washington, D.C.
- Historic Bethel African Methodist Episcopal Church, 226 East Howry Avenue, DeLand, Florida
- William Lee Taylor mansion in Richmond, Virginia (1907), 526 N. 2nd Street, Richmond, Virginia
Architecture of John A. Lankford

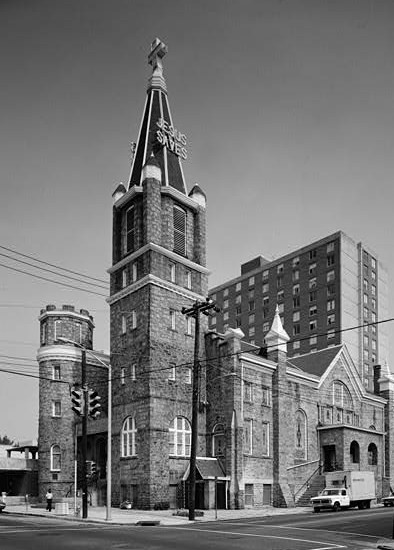
Big Bethel AME Church
Atlanta, Georgia

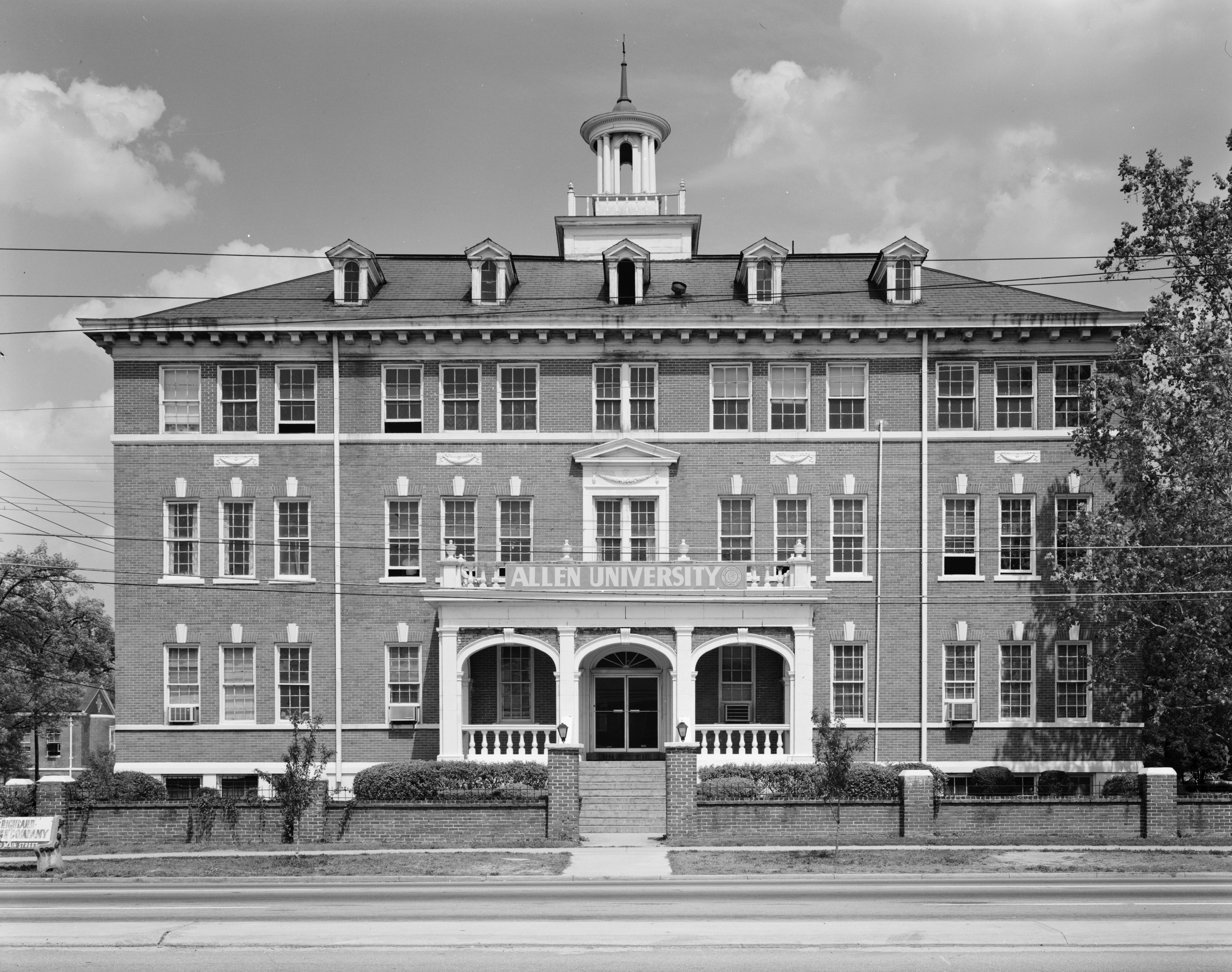
Chappelle Administration Building

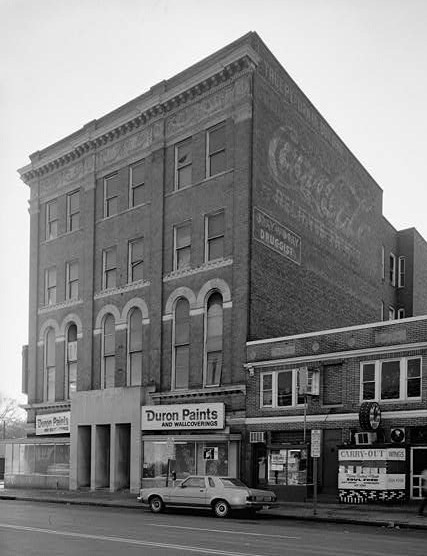
True Reformer Hall,
Washington, D.C.

== See also ==
- African-American architects
