= Allen University =

Historically black university in Columbia, South Carolina, US

- Former names: Payne Institute (1870–1880)
- Motto: We Teach The Mind To Think, The Hands To Work, The Heart To Love
- Type: Private historically black university
- Established: 1870; 156 years ago
- Affiliations: UNCF
- Religious affiliation: African Methodist Episcopal Church
- Endowment: $629,320 (2024)
- President: Stanley Jerome Pritchett Sr.
- Administrative staff: 530
- Students: 677 (fall 2023)
- Location: Columbia, South Carolina, United States
- Campus: Urban
- Colors: Royal Blue & Gold
- Nickname: Yellow Jackets
- Sporting affiliations: NCAA Division II – SIAC
- Mascot: Yellow Jacket
- Website: allenuniversity.edu

Allen University is a private historically black university in Columbia, South Carolina, United States. It has more than 600 students and still serves a predominantly Black constituency. The campus is listed on the National Register of Historic Places as Allen University Historic District.

== History ==
Allen University was founded in Cokesbury in 1870 as Payne Institute by ministers of the African Methodist Episcopal Church, including John M. Brown. Its initial mission was to provide education to freedmen, former African American slaves and their children.

In 1880, it was moved to Columbia and renamed Allen University in honor of Richard Allen, founder of the African Methodist Episcopal Church. The university remains connected to the denomination, which is related to other Methodist churches. As one of two black colleges located in Columbia, Allen has a very strong presence in the African-American community. Allen University initially focused on training ministers and teachers, who were considered critical to the progress of African Americans. Over the years, it has enlarged its scope to produce graduates in other academic areas.

In 1885, Joseph W. Morris became president of the university. By 1898, the university reported having a total of 9 faculty, 304 students, and 208 graduates.

== Academics ==
The university is accredited by the Southern Association of Colleges and Schools to offer Bachelor of Arts and Bachelor of Science degrees. These degree programs are organized into five divisions:

- Division of Humanities
- Division of Social Sciences
- Division of Mathematics and Natural Sciences
- Division of Business Administration
- Division of Religion

In 2010, Washington Monthly reported in its annual College Guide edition that the school had a six percent graduation rate. In 2018, Allen University launched its first graduate program, the Dickerson-Green Theological Seminary. Under the seminary's founding dean, Jamal-Dominique Hopkins, Dickerson-Green Theological Seminary gained member status with the Association of Theological Schools in the United States and Canada to offer the Master of Arts in Religion and Master of Divinity degrees.

== Campus ==
- Allen University
- U.S. National Register of Historic Places
- U.S. Historic district
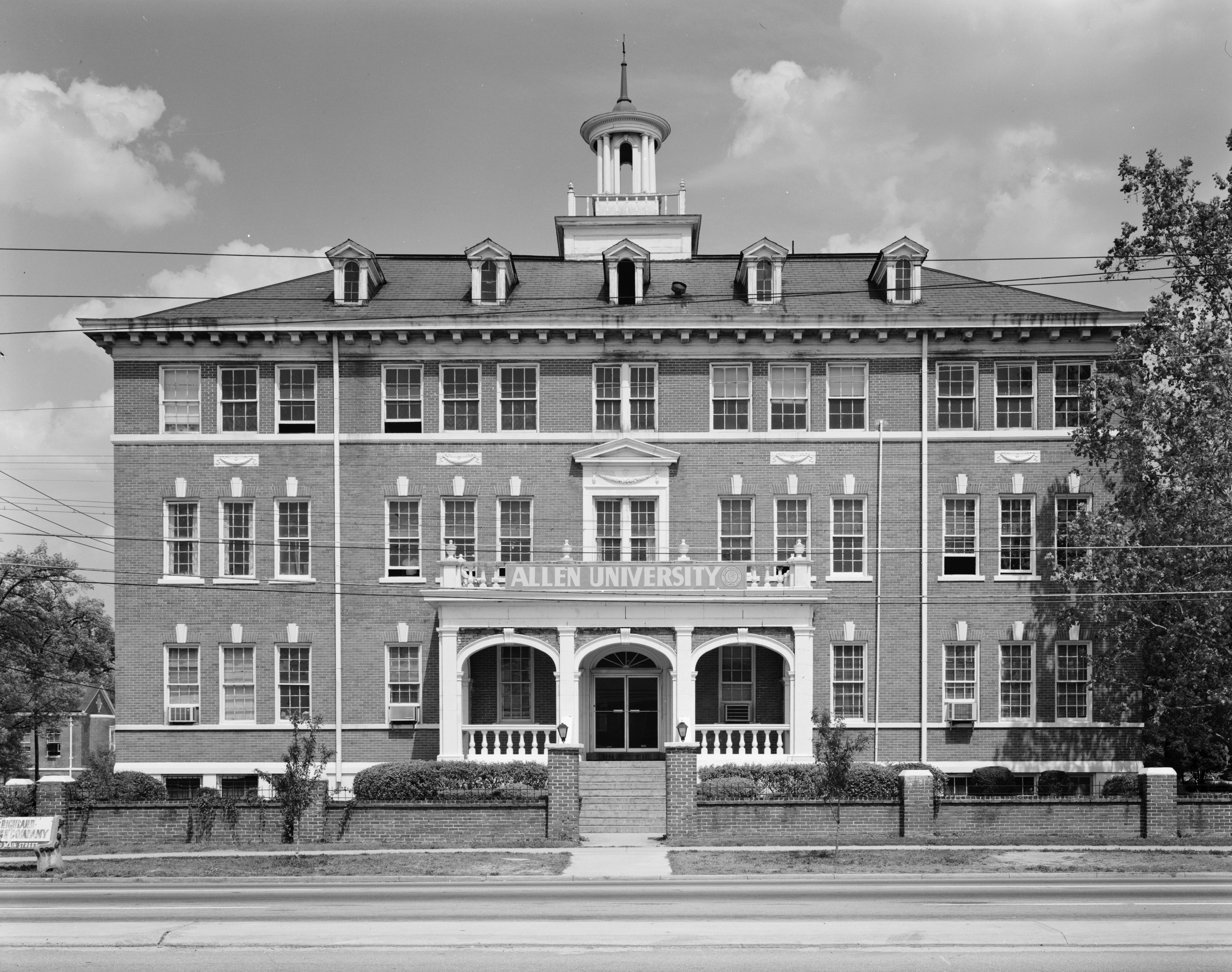
- Chappelle Administration Building
- Location: 1530 Harden St., Columbia, South Carolina
- Coordinates: 34°0′38″N 81°1′14″W
- Built: 1891
- NRHP reference No.: 75001705
- Added to NRHP: April 14, 1975

Buildings such as Arnett Hall, the Chappelle Administration Building, Coppin Hall, the Joseph Simon Flippen Library, and the Canteen Building are included in what is designated as the Allen University Historic District, listed in 1975 on the National Register of Historic Places.

In addition to its National Register of Historic Places status, Allen University Historic District falls within the boundaries of Waverly Protection Area, a Preservation District within the City of Columbia Urban Design and Historic Preservation District system. This Preservation District is an expansion of Waverly Historic District.

Several of the district's buildings were restored, using $2.9 million in funds obtained through the Historically Black Colleges and Universities Historic Building Restoration and Preservation Act. Chappelle Auditorium's seating capacity of 700 has made it the site of countless organizations' and community events.

The auditorium was the site of the meeting of educators and lawyers to initiate efforts that led to the landmark US Supreme Court case Brown v. Board of Education (1954) on school integration. Nationally known musicians and artists, including Leontyne Price, Brook Benton and Langston Hughes, have performed in the auditorium. Notable speakers include: Mary McCleod Bethune, Rev. Martin Luther King Jr., Muhammad Ali, Reverend Jesse Jackson, George Elmore, John H. McCray, and Senator Strom Thurmond. The auditorium was named in honor of Bishop William D. Chappelle, an Allen University President. On April 14, 1975, Chappelle Administration Building was recognized by the U.S. Department of the Interior and placed on the National Register of Historic Places.

Chappelle Administration Building was designed by John Anderson Lankford (1874–1946), who is known as the "Dean of Black Architects". It is a National Historic Landmark. Lankford also served as the official architect of the AME Church.

- Adams Gymnatorium
- Arnett Hall
- Cafeteria
- Chappelle Administration Building (a National Historic Landmark)
- Coppin Hall
- Counseling Center
- Dickerson-Green Theological Seminary House
- Flipper Library
- Higgins Hall
- Mance House
- Reid Hall
- Richard Allen Apartments
- Williams Living and Learning Complex

== Student life ==
Undergraduate demographics as of Fall 2023
Race and ethnicity	Total
Black	90%
Hispanic	3%
Two or more races	3%
International student	2%
American Indian/Alaska Native	1%
Unknown	1%
Economic diversity
Low-income (Note: The percentage of students who received an income-based federal Pell grant intended for low-income students.)	83%
Affluent (Note: The percentage of students who are a part of the American middle class at the bare minimum.)	17%

Allen University is the home of more than 15 on-campus student organizations.

=== National Pan-Hellenic Council organizations ===
Allen University has eight of the nine national black fraternities and sororities of the National Pan-Hellenic Council present on campus.

== Athletics ==
The Allen athletic teams are called the Yellow Jackets.

The university is a member of the NCAA Division II ranks, primarily competing in the Southern Intercollegiate Athletic Conference (SIAC) as a member since the 2020–21 academic year (achieving D-II full member status in 2022–23); which they were a member on a previous stint from 1947–48 to 1968–69. The Yellow Jackets previously competed in the Southeastern Athletic Conference from 1929 to 1947, the Appalachian Athletic Conference (AAC) of the National Association of Intercollegiate Athletics (NAIA) from 2016–17 to 2019–20; as an NAIA Independent within the Association of Independent Institutions (AII) from 2005–06 to 2015–16; and in the defunct Eastern Intercollegiate Athletic Conference (EIAC) from 1983–84 to 2004–05.

Allen competes in 12 intercollegiate varsity sports. Men's sports include basketball, cross country, football, track & field and wrestling; while women's sports include basketball, cross country, soccer, softball, track & field, volleyball, and wrestling.

=== Marching band ===
Following the reinstatement of the football program in 2018, the marching band, known as the Band of Gold, was reinstated under the direction of former Marching 101 director Eddie Ellis.

== Notable alumni ==
Name	Class year	Notability	References
Fannie Phelps Adams	1934	American educator and activist	
Ralph Anderson	1949	member of the South Carolina House of Representatives (1991- 1996) South Carolina Senate, 19th District (1997)	
Sam Davis	1967	American retired football player, who played for the National Football League's Pittsburgh Steelers from 1967 to 1979.	
Joseph DeLaine	1931	minister and civil rights leader who worked with South Carolina NAACP on the legal case Briggs vs Elliot in 1952. It was one of the four cases argued under Brown vs. Board of Education	
Lewis C. Dowdy	1939	American educator; Sixth president and first chancellor of North Carolina Agricultural and Technical State University	
William Clyburn	1964	member of Aiken City Council (1973-1980) (1983-1983) the South Carolina House of Representatives, 82nd District (1995-Present)	
George Harold		former professional American football player	
Dock J. Jordan	1892	American lawyer, author, educator, civil rights activist; President of Edward Waters University and Kittrell College.	
Hall Johnson	1908	American composer and arranger	
Kay Patterson	1956	member of the South Carolina Senate, 7th District (1985-2008)	
Clementa Carlos Pinckney	1995	member of the South Carolina House of Representatives, 73rd District (1997- 2000) SC Senate District 45 (2000-2015)	
DeWitt Williams	1950	member of the South Carolina Senate, 102nd District (1983-1996-present) SC Senate (1996-1997) District 102nd	
