= James Myles Hinton =

American minister, business person, civil rights leader (1891–1970)

James Myles Hinton Sr.
- Born: 1891; Gates County, North Carolina, U.S.
- Died: November 21, 1970 (aged 78–79); Augusta, Georgia, U.S.
- Other names: James Myers Hinton, James Myles Hinton, Sr., J. M. Hinton
- Occupations: Minister, businessperson, civil rights leader
- Spouses: Ethel Bell, Lula V. Thomas
- Children: 4

Rev. James Myles Hinton Sr. (1891–1970) was an American minister, businessperson, and civil rights leader. Hinton was a leader within the National Association for the Advancement of Colored People (NAACP) in South Carolina during the Jim Crow era in the 1940s and 1950s; he was a president of the local chapter, and served as the second president of the South Carolina Conference of Branches of the NAACP, from 1941 to 1958. In later life, Hinton served as the pastor at the Second Calvary Baptist Church in Columbia, South Carolina. In the 1940s and 1950s, he experienced harassment and violence from the Ku Klux Klan and/or other White supremacy organizations.

== Early life ==
James Myles Hinton was born in 1891 in Gates County, North Carolina, and at age four he moved with his family to New York City. He was raised by his aunt. In 1917, he was drafted into the United States Army, where Hinton rose to the rank of infantry lieutenant. He served during World War I at Camp Hancock in Georgia.

== Career ==
After the war Hinton worked for Pilgrim Health and Life Insurance Company in Augusta, Georgia. He married Ethel Bell, who died in 1935, and left him a widower with their four children. Hinton married Lula V. Thomas two years later in 1937, and moved shortly after with his children to Columbia, South Carolina.

In 1939, Hinton was elected president of the NAACP for the Columbia, South Carolina branch. He met in March 1941 with the provost marshal at the military base Fort Jackson, to discuss the military and city police harassment of Black people in the community of Columbia. Within the first few years he expanded membership, and grew the number of NAACP branches. In October 1941, he was elected as the second president of the South Carolina Conference of Branches of the NAACP, succeeding Rev. Alonzo Webster Wright. Hinton also serves as in leadership positions for the Colored Citizens Committee, the Negro Citizens Committee, the Negro Division of the American Red Cross War Fund Drive, the Negro Defense Recreation Committee, and the Richland County Interracial Committee. He often held fundraising and recruitment efforts.

From 1941 until 1958, Hinton coordinated with Thurgood Marshall on lawsuits challenging unequal teacher pay, all-White primaries, and school segregation. South Carolina state representative John David Long had introduced a Congressional Resolution, a "pledge to White supremacy" in March 2, 1944; and Hinton led the NAACP to fight the issue in court.

In April 1944, after the passage of Smith v. Allwright, a U.S. Supreme Court Case stating Black citizens cannot legally be denied participation in election primaries; days later South Carolina Governor Olin D. Johnston called a special session of the General Assembly and introduced "The South Carolina Plan" in order to maintain all-white primaries through repealing laws. During this time period, Hinton was raising money for a voting rights lawsuit and was actively fighting for change. One such lawsuit was George Elmore, a light-skinned man who was able to register to vote (because he was assumed white), but was later denied a vote in Richland County; he was able to sue with the support of the Columbia NAACP. As a result of the General Assembly passing 147 bills in six days "The South Carolina Plan" was able to maintain an all-white primary in the state, and it was only until 1947 it was declared unconstitutional by the federal government.

In December 1942, Hinton started to experience harassment from the Ku Klux Klan (KKK), and became vocal about his opposition to the organization. He was chained to a tree and beaten by White men on April 21, 1949, in Augusta. Hinton also experienced multiple gunshots being fired at his home in Columbia in 1956.

Hinton was named a vice president on the NAACP national board of directors in 1964; and named the chairman of Pilgrim Health and Life Insurance Company's board of directors in 1966. In 1959, he becomes a pastor at the Second Calvary Baptist Church in Columbia, South Carolina. He also served as chaplain at the Black prison and state mental health hospital in Columbia.

Hinton is featured in the book, Stories of Struggle: The Clash Over Civil Rights in South Carolina (University of South Carolina Press, 2020) by Claudia Smith Brinson, which highlights civil rights leaders in South Carolina.
