= 2002 United States House of Representatives elections in South Carolina =

- November 5, 2002

All 6 South Carolina seats to the United States House of Representatives
	Majority party	Minority party
Party	Republican	Democratic
Last election	4	2
Seats won	4	2
Seat change	Steady	Steady
Popular vote	569,267	344,972
Percentage	57.83%	35.04%
Swing	▲2.60%	▼4.55%

Republican
50–60%
60–70%
70–80%
80–90%
>90%
Democratic
50–60%
60–70%
70–80%
80–90%
>90%
Winners
Republican Hold
Democratic Hold

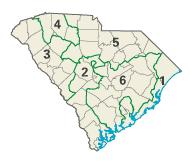
South Carolina's 6 congressional districts

The 2002 United States House of Representatives elections in South Carolina were held on November 5, 2002 to select six Representatives for two-year terms from the state of South Carolina. The primary elections for the Democrats and the Republicans were held on June 11 and the runoff elections were held two weeks later on June 25. All five incumbents who ran were re-elected and the open seat in the 3rd congressional district was retained by the Republicans. The composition of the state delegation remained four Republicans and two Democrats.

== Overview ==
United States House of Representatives elections in South Carolina, 2002
Party	Votes	Percentage	Seats	+/–
Republican	569,267	57.83%	4	—
Democratic	344,972	35.04%	2	—
United Citizens	28,203	2.86%	0	—
Libertarian	25,110	2.55%	0	—
Others	16,863	1.71%	0	—
Totals	984,415	100.00%	6	—

== District 1 ==
2002 South Carolina's 1st congressional district election
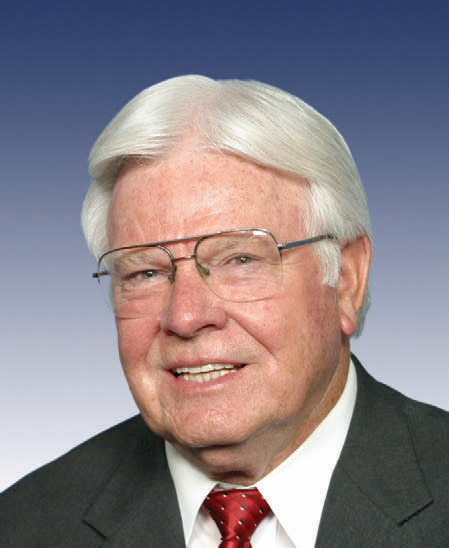

Nominee	Henry E. Brown, Jr.	James E. Dunn
Party	Republican	United Citizens
Popular vote	127,562	9,841
Percentage	89.6%	6.9%
- County results Brown: 80–90% 90–100%
U.S. Representative before election
Henry E. Brown, Jr.
Republican
Elected U.S. Representative
Henry E. Brown, Jr.
Republican

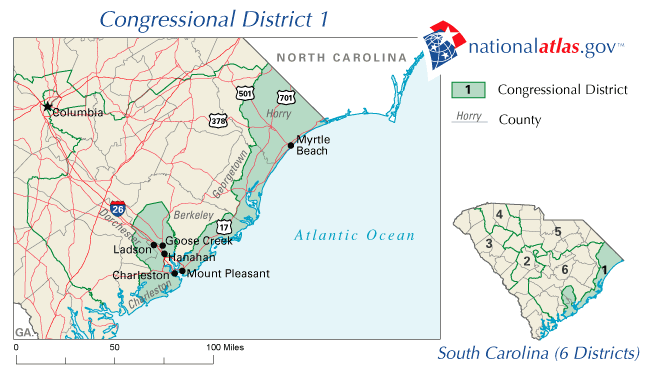

This conservative district, which stretches along coastal South Carolina from the North Carolina to Charleston County and includes Myrtle Beach and some of Charleston, was represented by Republican Congressman Henry E. Brown, Jr. since his initial election in 2000. Seeking a second term, Brown faced only United Citizens candidate James Dunn and Natural Law candidate Joe Innella, whom he dispatched easily.

=== Predictions ===
Source	Ranking	As of
Sabato's Crystal Ball	Safe R	November 4, 2002
New York Times	Safe R	October 14, 2002

=== Results ===
South Carolina's 1st congressional district election, 2002
Party	Candidate	Votes	%
Republican	Henry E. Brown, Jr. (inc.)	127,562	89.56
United Citizens	James E. Dunn	9,841	6.91
Natural Law	Joe Innella	4,965	3.49
Write-ins		57	0.04
Total votes		142,425	100.00
Republican hold			

== District 2 ==
2002 South Carolina's 2nd congressional district election
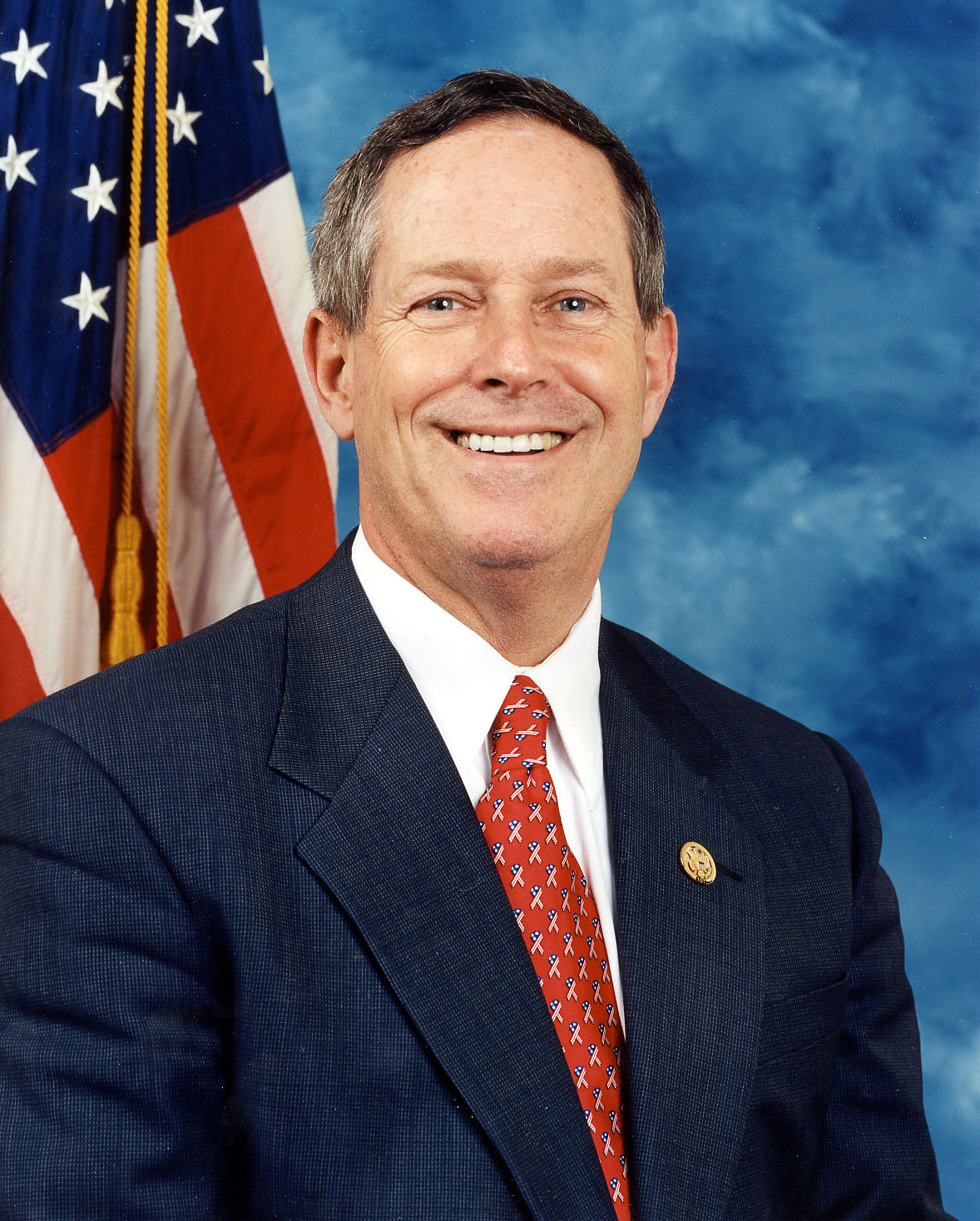

Nominee	Joe Wilson	Mark Whittington	Jim Legg
Party	Republican	United Citizens	Libertarian
Popular vote	144,149	17,189	9,650
Percentage	84.1%	10.0%	5.6%
- County results Wilson: 70–80% 80–90% 90–100%
U.S. Representative before election
Joe Wilson
Republican
Elected U.S. Representative
Joe Wilson
Republican

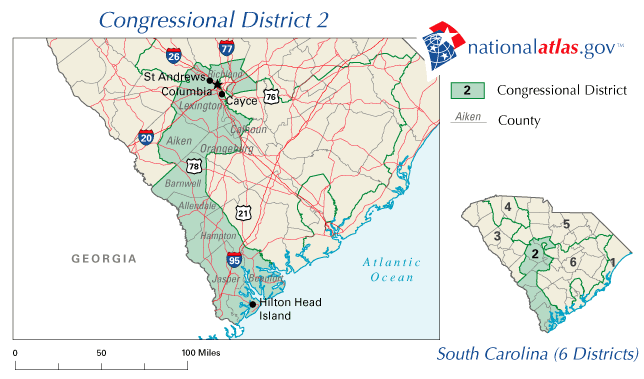

Initially elected in a 2001 special election, incumbent Republican Congressman Joe Wilson sought a full term. This conservative district, which spans from the southern coast of South Carolina to Columbia in central South Carolina, easily elected Wilson in 2001. This year, he faced only United Citizens candidate Mark Whittington and Libertarian nominee Jim Legg, whom he crushed in a landslide.

=== Predictions ===
Source	Ranking	As of
Sabato's Crystal Ball	Safe R	November 4, 2002
New York Times	Safe R	October 14, 2002

=== Results ===
South Carolina's 2nd congressional district election, 2002
Party	Candidate	Votes	%
Republican	Joe Wilson (inc.)	144,149	84.12
United Citizens	Mark Whittington	17,189	10.03
Libertarian	Jim Legg	9,650	5.63
Write-ins		371	0.22
Total votes		171,359	100.00
Republican hold			

== District 3 ==
2002 South Carolina's 3rd congressional district election
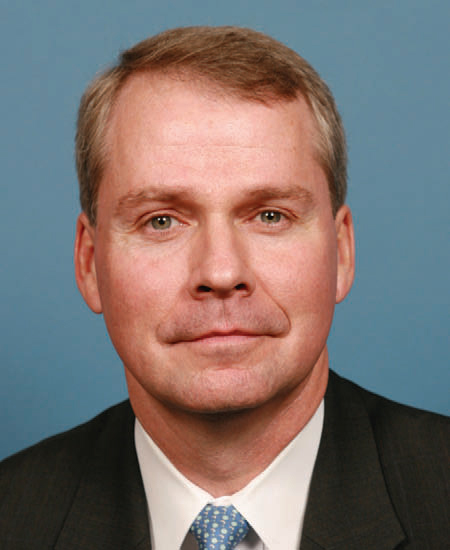

Nominee	J. Gresham Barrett	George L. Brightharp
Party	Republican	Democratic
Popular vote	119,644	55,743
Percentage	67.1%	31.3%
- County results Barrett: 50–60% 60–70% 70–80%
U.S. Representative before election
Lindsey Graham
Republican
Elected U.S. Representative
J. Gresham Barrett
Republican

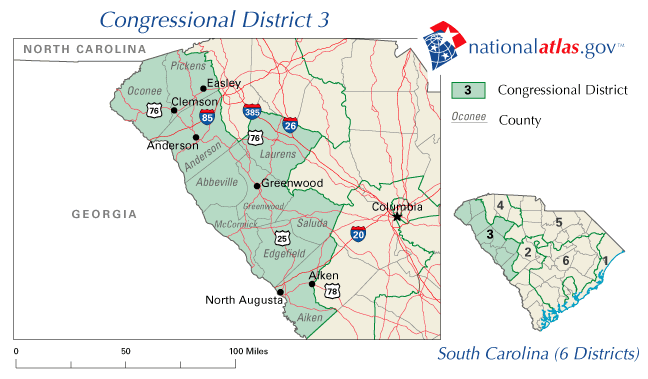

When incumbent Republican Congressman Lindsey Graham declined to seek a fifth term, instead opting to run for Senate, an open seat was created. South Carolina State Representative J. Gresham Barrett entered the fray and emerged as the Republican nominee. George Brightharp, the 2000 Democratic nominee for this seat, ran again, but was crushed in the general election by Barrett.

=== Predictions ===
Source	Ranking	As of
Sabato's Crystal Ball	Safe R	November 4, 2002
New York Times	Safe R	October 14, 2002

=== Results ===
South Carolina's 3rd congressional district election, 2002
Party	Candidate	Votes	%
Republican	J. Gresham Barrett	119,644	67.14
Democratic	George L. Brightharp	55,743	31.28
Libertarian	Mike Boerste	2,785	1.56
Write-ins		23	0.01
Total votes		178,195	100.00
Republican hold			

== District 4 ==
2002 South Carolina's 4th congressional district election
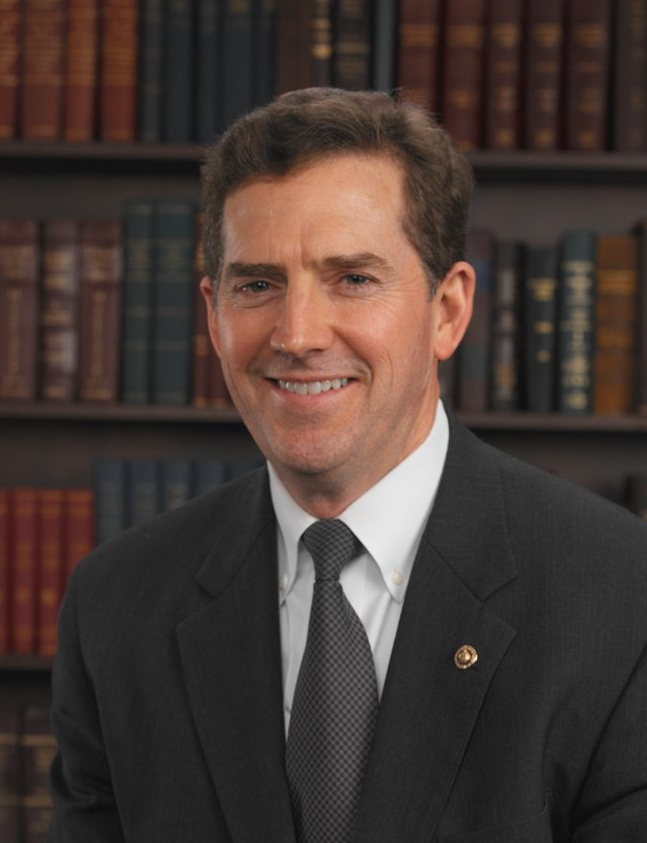

Nominee	Jim DeMint	Peter J. Ashy
Party	Republican	Democratic
Popular vote	122,422	52,635
Percentage	69.0%	29.7%
- County results DeMint: 60–70% 70–80%
U.S. Representative before election
Jim DeMint
Republican
Elected U.S. Representative
Jim DeMint
Republican

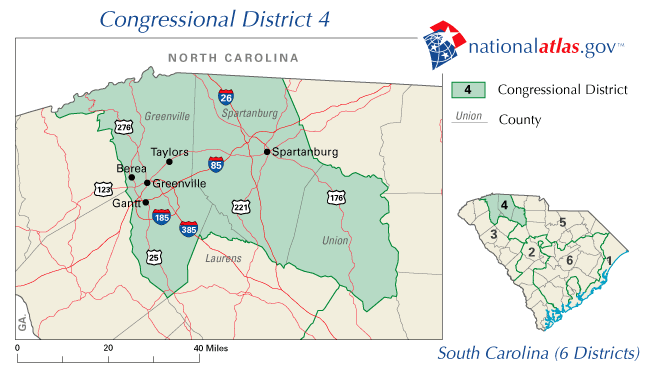

In this stictly conservative district based in Spartanburg and Greenville, incumbent Republican Congressman Jim DeMint since his initial election in 1998. Seeking a third term, DeMint faced Democratic candidate Peter Ashy and Natural Law candidate C. Faye Walters. DeMint ultimately defeated both candidates to secure another term in Congress.

=== Predictions ===
Source	Ranking	As of
Sabato's Crystal Ball	Safe R	November 4, 2002
New York Times	Safe R	October 14, 2002

=== Results ===
South Carolina's 4th congressional district election, 2002
Party	Candidate	Votes	%
Republican	Jim DeMint (inc.)	122,422	69.00
Democratic	Peter J. Ashy	52,635	29.67
Natural Law	C. Faye Walters	2,176	1.23
Write-ins		184	0.10
Total votes		177,417	100.00
Republican hold			

== District 5 ==
2002 South Carolina's 5th congressional district election
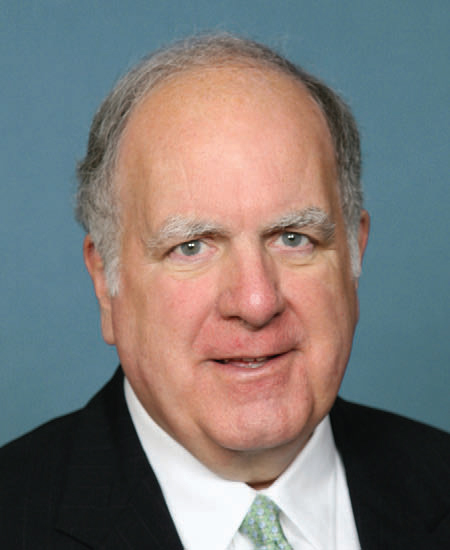

Nominee	John Spratt	Doug Kendall	Steve Lefemine
Party	Democratic	Libertarian	Constitution
Popular vote	121,912	11,013	8,930
Percentage	85.9%	7.8%	6.3%
- County results Spratt: 70–80% 80–90% 90–100%
U.S. Representative before election
John Spratt
Democratic
Elected U.S. Representative
John Spratt
Democratic

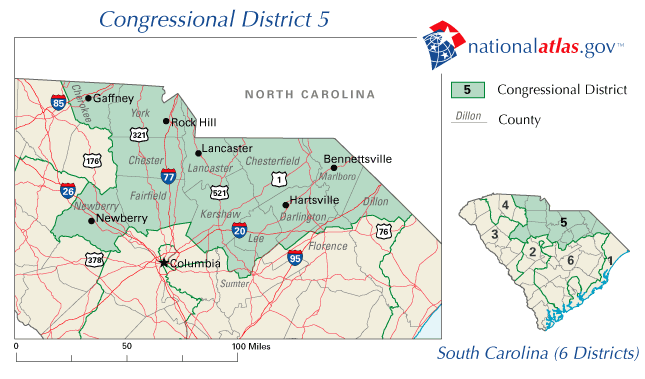

In this conservative-leaning district based in northern South Carolina, Democratic Congressman John Spratt has managed to maintain his popularity since he was first elected in 1982. This year proved to be no different, and Spratt, seeking an eleventh term, defeated Libertarian Doug Kendall and Constitution Party candidate Steve Lefemine in a landslide.

=== Predictions ===
Source	Ranking	As of
Sabato's Crystal Ball	Safe D	November 4, 2002
New York Times	Safe D	October 14, 2002

=== Results ===
South Carolina's 5th congressional district election, 2002
Party	Candidate	Votes	%
Democratic	John Spratt (inc.)	121,912	85.87
Libertarian	Doug Kendall	11,013	7.76
Constitution	Steve Lefemine	8,930	6.29
Write-ins		117	0.08
Total votes		141,972	100.00
Democratic hold			

== District 6 ==
2002 South Carolina's 6th congressional district election
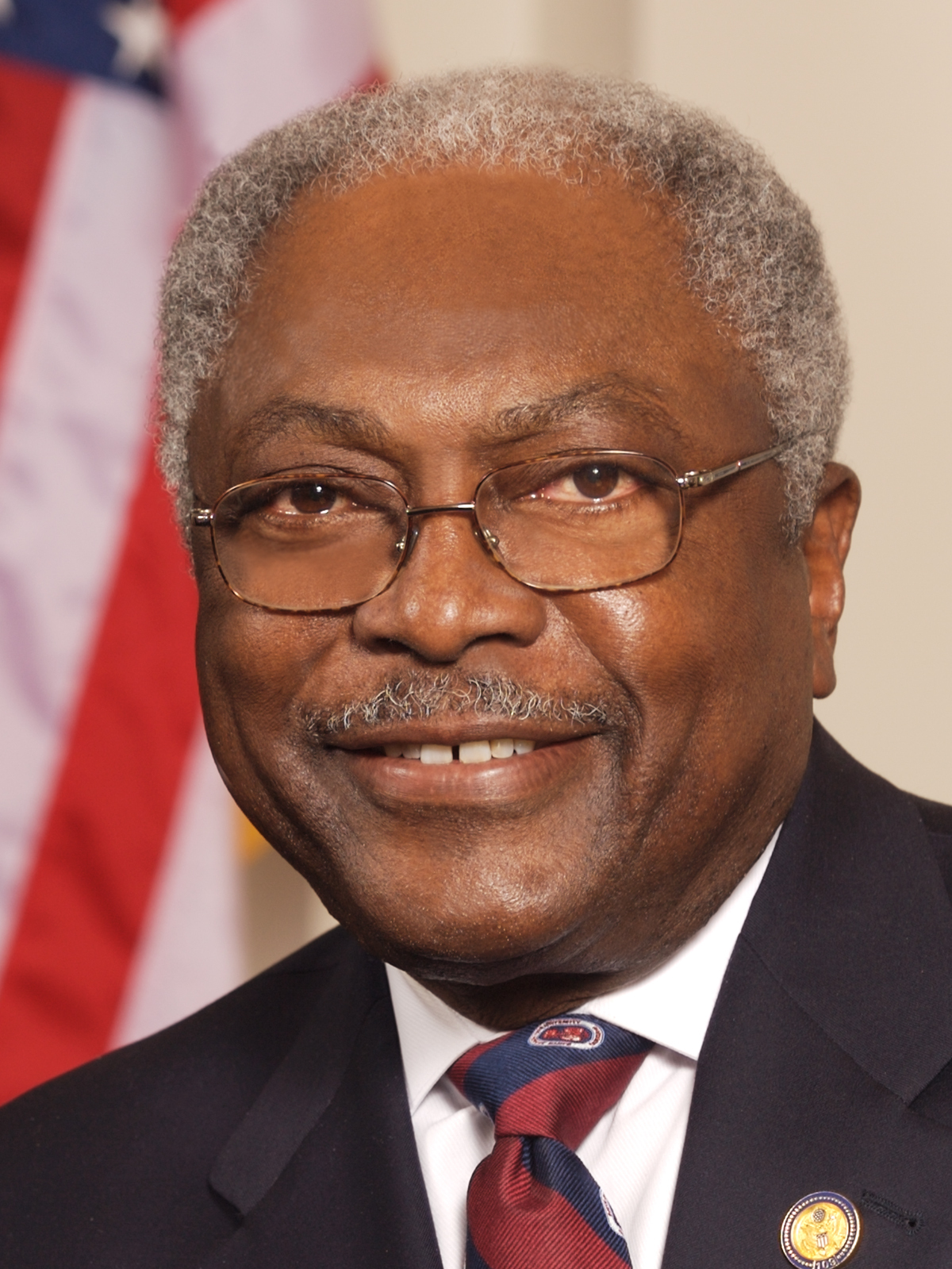

Nominee	Jim Clyburn	Gary McLeod
Party	Democratic	Republican
Popular vote	115,855	55,490
Percentage	67.0%	32.1%
- County results Clyburn: 50–60% 60–70% 70–80% 80–90% McLeod: 40–50%
U.S. Representative before election
Jim Clyburn
Democratic
Elected U.S. Representative
Jim Clyburn
Democratic

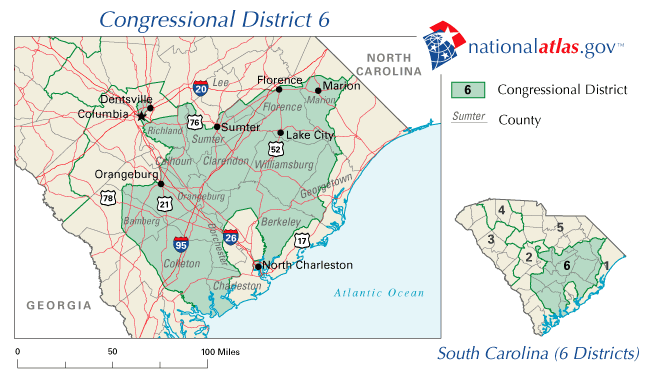

This district, the most liberal one in South Carolina, was crafted to ensure an African-American majority in it. Pulling from central South Carolina counties and from black-dominated areas in Charleston and Columbia, it achieved its purpose. Congressman Jim Clyburn, an African-American, has represented this district since 1993 and sought a sixth term in the general election. Clyburn took full advantage of the district's Democratic tendencies and steamrolled Republican Gary McLeod and Libertarian Craig Augenstein.

=== Predictions ===
Source	Ranking	As of
Sabato's Crystal Ball	Safe D	November 4, 2002
New York Times	Safe D	October 14, 2002

=== Results ===
South Carolina's 6th congressional district election, 2002
Party	Candidate	Votes	%
Democratic	Jim Clyburn (inc.)	115,855	66.95
Republican	Gary McLeod	55,490	32.07
Libertarian	R. Craig Augenstein	1,662	0.96
Write-ins		40	0.02
Total votes		173,047	100.00
Democratic hold			

== See also ==
- South Carolina's congressional districts
