= Security and Privacy in Your Car Study Act =

The Security and Privacy in Your Car Study Act of 2017, short title "SPY Car Study Act of 2017", is a bill introduced in the House of Representatives by Reps. Joe Wilson (R–SC) and Ted Lieu (D–CA) in January 2017 and referred to the House Committee on Energy and Commerce. It built upon a previous bill introduced in the House in 2015. In 2015, another bill was introduced in the Senate directing the National Highway Traffic Safety Administration to create standards for automakers regarding cybersecurity. The SPY Car Study Act of 2017 does not introduce any new regulations, but mandates a study done by the NHTSA into the safety of cars against technological threats.

== Provisions ==
This bill requires the NHTSA to conduct a study to determine and recommend standards for the regulation of the cybersecurity of motor vehicles manufactured or imported for sale in the United States. The study shall identify:

- Isolation measures that are necessary to separate critical software systems that can affect the driver's control of the movement of the vehicle from other software systems;
- Measures that are necessary to detect and prevent or minimize anomalous codes, in vehicle software systems, associated with malicious behavior;
- Techniques that are necessary to detect and prevent, discourage, or mitigate intrusions into vehicle software systems and other cybersecurity risks in motor vehicles;
- Best practices to secure driving data about a vehicle's status or about the owner, lessee, driver, or passenger of a vehicle that is collected by the electronic systems of motor vehicles;
- A timeline for implementing systems and software that reflect such measures, techniques, and best practices.
