= Kay Patterson (American politician) =

American politician (1931–2024)

Member of the South Carolina Senate from the 19th district
- In office November 5, 1985 – 2008
- Preceded by: Isaiah DeQuincey Newman
- Succeeded by: John L. Scott Jr.

Member of the South Carolina House of Representatives from the 73rd district
- In office 1975–1985
- Succeeded by: Joe Ellis Brown

Personal details
- Born: January 11, 1931 Darlington, South Carolina, U.S.
- Died: December 13, 2024 (aged 93) Columbia, South Carolina, U.S.
- Party: Democratic
- Spouse: Jean James
- Children: 2
- Education: Allen University, South Carolina State College
- Profession: Educator

Kay Patterson (January 11, 1931 – December 13, 2024) was an American politician who was a Democratic member of the South Carolina Senate, representing the 19th District from 1985 to his retirement in 2008. He was previously a member of the South Carolina House of Representatives from 1975 through 1985.

== Early life and career ==
Patterson was born in Darlington County on January 11, 1931, the son of James and Leila Patterson, and was raised in Darlington and Sumter Counties by his grandmothers, Mrs. Meta B. Patterson and Mrs. Emma Joseph. He graduated from Lincoln High in Sumter, South Carolina, in 1949. Senator Patterson attended Claflin College, now Claflin University, in 1949-1951. After he served in the United States Marine Corps from 1951 to 1953 as sergeant, he completed requirements for the baccalaureate degree in Social Sciences at Allen University in 1956. He pursued additional education at Temple University and attended an NDEA Institute in Black History at Atlanta University in 1963. He received the Masters of Education Degree from South Carolina State College, later South Carolina State University, in 1971.

Patterson taught for fourteen years at W. A. Perry Middle School, C. A. Johnson Preparatory Academy, and Benedict College, and served for 16 years as a UniServ Representative for the South Carolina Education Association, from which he retired in June 1986. He was a member of St. Luke's Episcopal Church where he has served as Senior Warden of the Vestry, Secretary and Treasurer of the Vestry.

Patterson was active in many civic and community organizations which include the North Columbia Civic Club and life membership in the NAACP. While a student at Claflin College (1949–1951), he joined the Omega Psi Phi fraternity and Edisto Lodge No. 39 Prince-Hall Masons. He served as a Commissioner on the Education Commission of the States, as a member of the State Reorganization Commission, and a member of the Southern Regional Education Board (SREB). In January 1983, he was elected by the S. C. House Education Committee to serve on the University of South Carolina Trustee Board, the first African-American to serve on the Board since Reconstruction.

== Political career ==
=== South Carolina Senate ===
Patterson won a special election to South Carolina State Senate District 19 in November 1985, going on to serve as an outspoken legislator championing the cause of the poor and downtrodden. Patterson succeeded I. DeQuincey Newman, the first Black person to serve in the South Carolina Senate since Reconstruction. Patterson's office sent out a notice for the unveiling of Newman's portrait, the first portrait of a Black person to hang in the South Carolina Senate chamber. In 1990, he served as Chairman of the South Carolina Legislative Black Caucus.

Patterson served on the Senate Banking & Insurance, Corrections & Penology, Education, Finance, and Transportation committees, and as a commissioner for the South Carolina Department of Highways and Public Transportation. He also served as Chairman of the Richland County Legislative Delegation.

In 2008, Patterson retired and was replaced in the Senate by John L. Scott Jr., a former State House representative. Scott won a close fought Democratic primary runoff victory (75 votes) against Richland One School Board Chairman, Vince Ford and went on to defeat United Citizens Party candidate Chris Nelums in the general election.

=== South Carolina House ===
Patterson was elected to the South Carolina House of Representatives in 1974. Upon election to the State Senate, his former House District was represented by Joe Ellis Brown.

== Confederate flag removal ==
As an outspoken and fiery speaker in his practice of politics, Patterson was a moving force in promoting and effectuating change in the state of South Carolina. From 1980, he was a proponent for removal of the Confederate flag from the South Carolina State House dome, having sponsored a bill on the removal in 1983, decades prior to Governor Nikki Haley signing a bill into law.

In 2021, Patterson was a plaintiff, along with Jennifer Pinckney, widow of Senator Clementa C. Pinckney suing against the Heritage Act, arguing that the Act was unconstitutional. The case was heard before the South Carolina Supreme Court.

== See also ==
- Modern display of the Confederate battle flag
- Charleston church shooting
- Bill Cotty
- Lonnie Randolph Jr.

== Honors and recognitions ==
- Kay Patterson Highway commissioned by the South Carolina Legislature, 1995
- Honorary doctorate, South Carolina State University, 2000.
- Columbia Housing Authority Wall of Fame, 2003
- African American History Calendar, 2003.
- Honorary Doctor of Public Service, University of South Carolina, 2005
- Induction into the Richland One Hall of Fame, 2007.
- Pioneer Award, Minority Business Development Agency (MBDA) Business Center – Columbia, SC, 2015
- Historical marker honoring Patterson's birthplace, Round O, South Carolina in Darlington County, unveiled 2016.
- Inaugural Clementa C. Pinckney Award presented by the South Carolina Legislative Black Caucus, 2016.

== Personal life and death ==
Patterson was married to Jean James of Pinewood, South Carolina, and had two children.

In 2003, Patterson was diagnosed with breast cancer, and received national attention for going public to share information with men about their health risks.

Patterson died in Columbia, South Carolina, on December 13, 2024, at the age of 93. His funeral service was held on December 20, 2024, at Columbia's Brookland Baptist Church, followed by burial at Greenlawn Cemetery. Governor Henry McMaster ordered that flags across the state be flown at half-staff on the day of Patterson's funeral.

Funeral attendees included former South Carolina Governor Jim Hodges, state Reps. Todd Rutherford and Gilda Cobb Hunter, and Columbia Mayor Daniel Rickenmann. Speakers included State Representative Leon Howard, Reverend Nelson B. Rivers with the National Action Network, Congressman Jim Clyburn, and daughter Pamela Patterson Lackey Video greetings were heard from comedian J. Anthony Brown and 1994 Miss America Kimberly Clarice Aiken. Others present included former Columbia Mayors Stephen K. Benjamin and Bob Coble, past and present State Senators Gerald Malloy, Thomas C. Alexander, Jeffrey R. Graham, Tameika Isaac Devine, Kent M. Williams, Maggie Wallace Glover, Karl B. Allen and Ronnie A. Sabb, and State House Representative Bill Clyburn.

== Posthumous honors and recognitions ==
In January 2025 the South Carolina Senate passed Resolution 182, and the South Carolina House of Representatives passed Resolution 3672 honoring Patterson.

In January 2025, South Carolina Educational Television hosted a series of Patterson recorded interviews on their website.
