= Archibald Hardy =

American politician (1953–2023)

Member of the South Carolina House of Representatives from the 77th district
- In office 1979–1983
- Preceded by: Harold Edward Taylor
- Succeeded by: Luther L Taylor Jr

Personal details
- Born: December 19, 1936
- Died: April 11, 2023 (aged 86) Saluda, North Carolina
- Spouse: Beverly M. Kinder
- Children: 5
- Education: University of South Carolina University of North Carolina University of Georgia
- Occupation: State agency official

Archibald Hardy III (December 19, 1936 – April 11, 2023) was an American politician who served as a member of the South Carolina Legislature from 1979 to 1983.

== Political career ==
Hardy worked as an Official for the South Carolina Department of Parks, Recreation and Tourism. He served as a long time Rotary Club member.

Upon Hardy's death, Governor Henry McMaster announced that flags would be lowered in his honor. On April 15, 2023, Executive Order 2023-28 was filed for that purpose.
