= Joe Wilson =

American politician (born 1947)

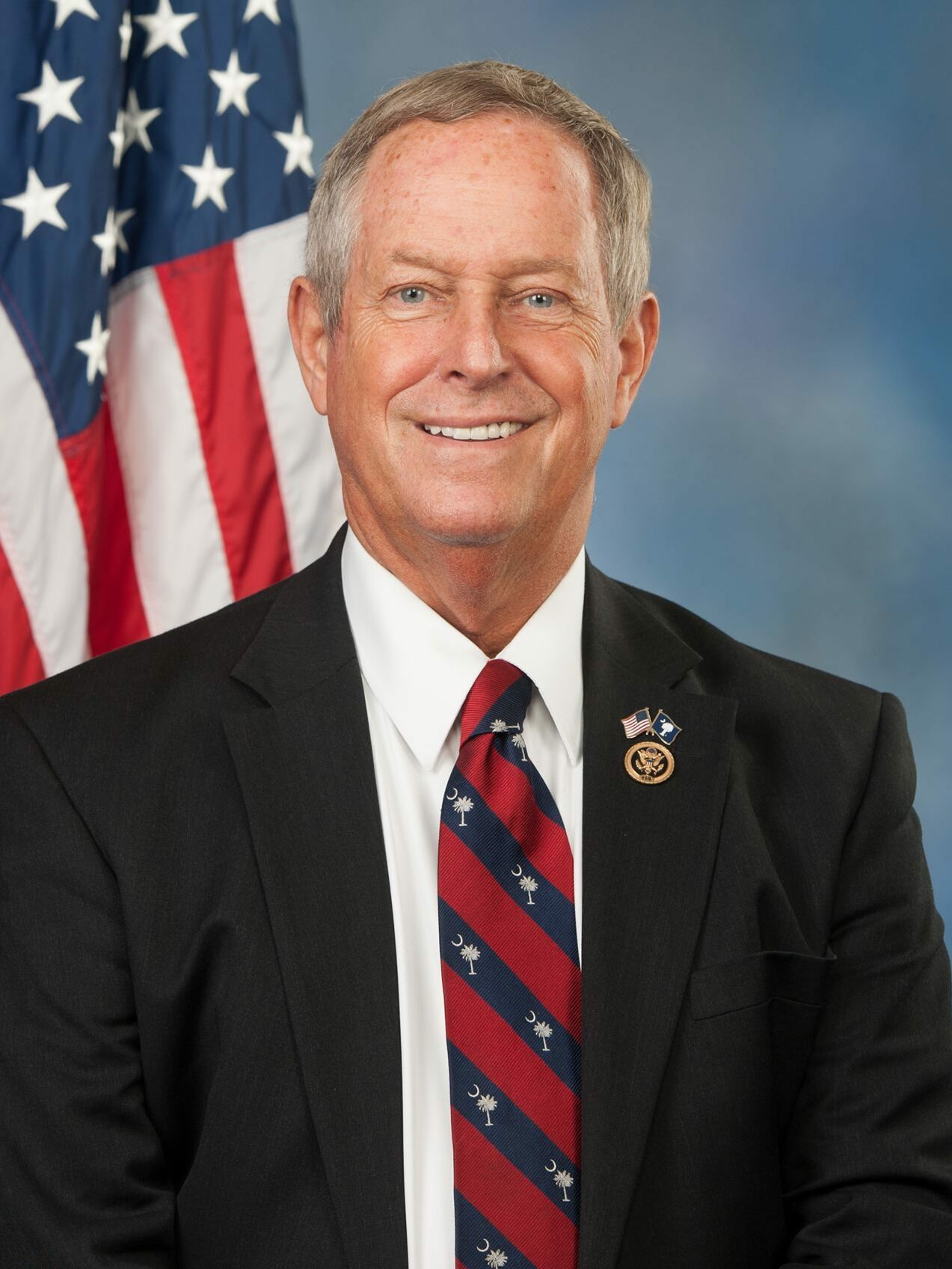
- Official portrait, 2015

Member of the U.S. House of Representatives from South Carolina's 2nd district
- Incumbent
- Assumed office December 18, 2001 (Note: Wilson's official service begins on the date of the special election, while he was not sworn in until December 19, 2001.)
- Preceded by: Floyd Spence

Member of the South Carolina Senate from the 23rd district
- In office January 8, 1985 – December 18, 2001
- Preceded by: Constituency established
- Succeeded by: Jake Knotts

Personal details
- Born: Addison Graves Wilson Sr. July 31, 1947 (age 79) Charleston, South Carolina, U.S.
- Party: Republican
- Spouse: Roxanne McCrory (m. 1977)
- Children: 4, including Alan (adopted)
- Education: Washington and Lee University (BA); University of South Carolina (JD)
- Website: House website Campaign website

Military service
- Branch/service: United States Army; Army Reserve; Army National Guard
- Years of service: 1972–1975 (reserve); 1975–2003 (guard)
- Rank: Colonel
- Unit: South Carolina Army National Guard; 218th Mechanized Infantry Brigade
- Wilson's voice Wilson on the Abraham Accords. Recorded September 16, 2020

Addison Graves "Joe" Wilson Sr. (born July 31, 1947) is an American politician and attorney serving as the U.S. representative for South Carolina's 2nd congressional district since 2001. A member of the Republican Party, his district stretches from Columbia to the Georgia–South Carolina border. He served as the South Carolina state senator from the 23rd district from 1985 to 2001.

Wilson is a member of the House Republican Policy Committee and an assistant Republican whip.

In September 2009, Wilson interrupted a speech by U.S. President Barack Obama to a joint session of Congress, shouting, "You lie!" The incident resulted in a reprimand by the House of Representatives.

== Early life and education ==
Wilson was born on July 31, 1947, in Charleston, South Carolina, the son of Wray (née Graves) and Hugh deVeaux Wilson. In 1969 he obtained a bachelor's degree in political science from Washington and Lee University, where he joined Sigma Nu. He obtained his Juris Doctor (J.D.) degree from the University of South Carolina School of Law in 1972.

== Early career ==
From 1972 to 1975, Wilson served in the United States Army Reserve. Thereafter, he was a Staff Judge Advocate in the South Carolina Army National Guard assigned to the 218th Mechanized Infantry Brigade until retiring from military service as a colonel in 2003.

A real estate attorney, Wilson co-founded the law firm Kirkland, Wilson, Moore, Taylor & Thomas in West Columbia, where he practiced for over 25 years. He was also a municipal judge in Springdale, South Carolina.

Wilson took part in his first Republican campaign in 1962, when he was 15 years old. He served as an aide to Senator Strom Thurmond and to his district's congressman, Floyd Spence.

In 1981 and 1982, during the first term of the Reagan administration, Wilson served as deputy general counsel for former governor Jim Edwards at the U.S. Department of Energy. Wilson is also a graduate of Morton Blackwell's Leadership Institute in Arlington, Virginia. Nominated by Lee Atwater, in 1990, he served as an election observer in Bulgaria.

=== South Carolina Senate ===
Wilson was elected to the South Carolina Senate in 1984 as a Republican from Lexington County and reelected four times, the last three times unopposed. He never missed a regular legislative session in 17 years.

In 1995, he was elected the Chairman of the General Committee. That same year, he was awarded the Order of the Palmetto by Governor Carroll Campbell. Wilson became the first Republican since Reconstruction to chair the Senate Transportation Committee in 2001. He was a member of Columbia College's board of visitors and Coker College's board of trustees.

During his tenure in the South Carolina Senate, Wilson was the primary sponsor of bills including the following: establishing a National Guard license plate, providing paid leave for state employees to perform disaster relief services, and requiring men aged 18–26 to register for the Selective Service System when applying for a driver's license. In 2000, Wilson was one of seven senators to vote against removing the Confederate battle flag from being displayed over the state house.

== U.S. House of Representatives ==
=== Committee assignments ===
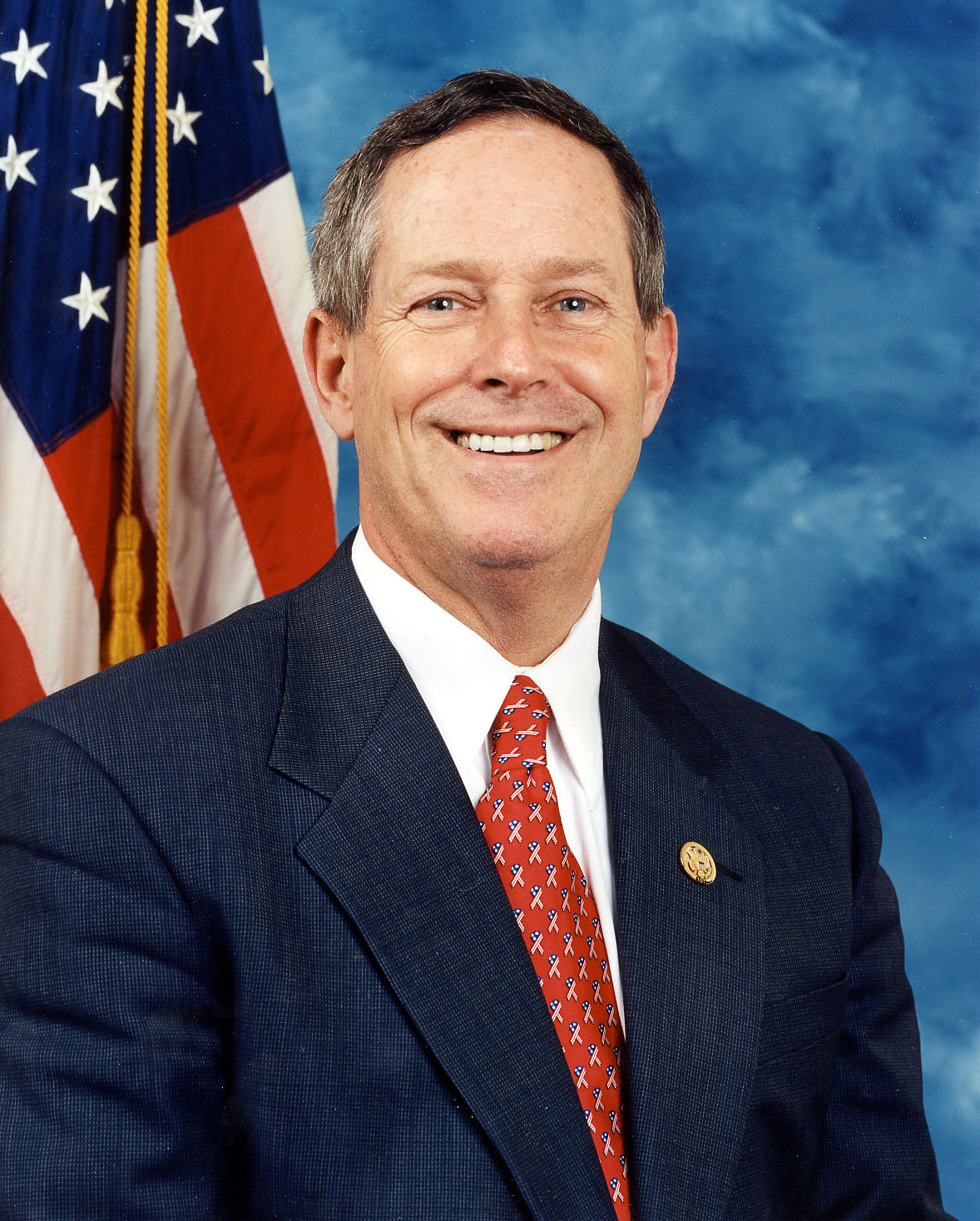
Official House photo portrait (109th Congress)

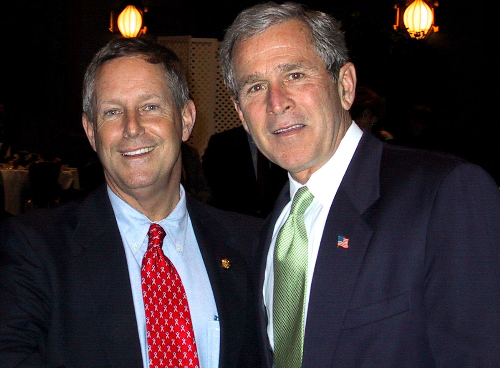
Wilson with President George W. Bush in 2002

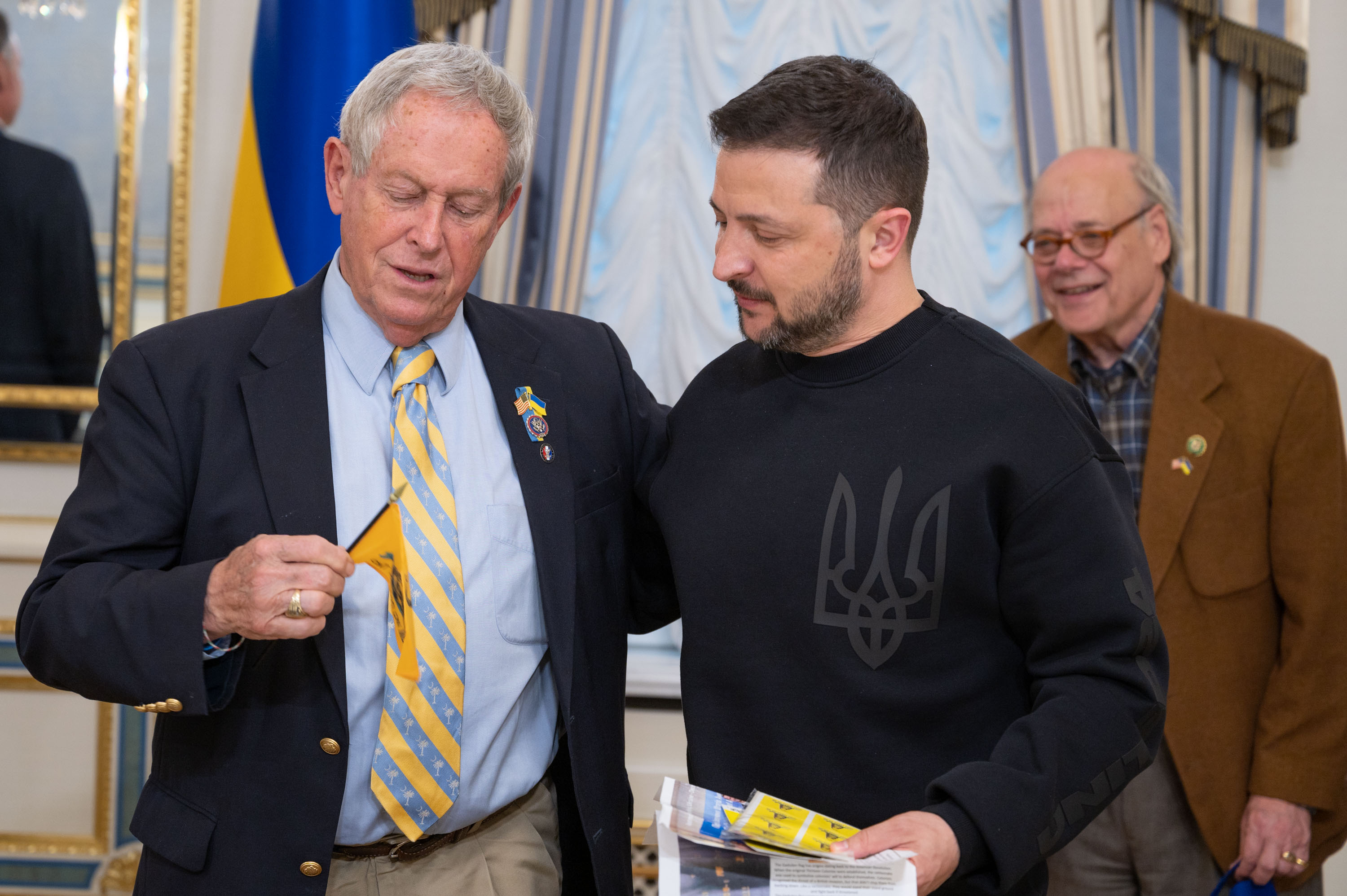
Wilson with Ukrainian President Volodymyr Zelenskyy in Kyiv, Ukraine, May 5, 2023

As of October 2026, Wilson served on three standing committees and various subcommittees overseeing specific areas of legislation. He serves on the Committee on Armed Services, for which he is also a member of the Subcommittee on Readiness and Subcommittee on Strategic Forces. He serves on the Committee on Education and the Workforce, for which he also is a member of the Subcommittee on Health, Employment, Labor, and Pensions and Subcommittee on Higher Education and Workforce Development. As a member of the Committee on Foreign Affairs, Wilson serves on the Subcommittee on Europe and the Subcommittee on the Middle East and North Africa. Wilson serves as the Co-Chair of the U.S. Helsinki Commission. Wilson is a member of the Republican Study Committee (RSC), Chair of the RSC National Security and Foreign Affairs Task Force, and a member of the Tea Party Caucus.

On June 27, 2024, Wilson announced he will run for the Chair of the House Foreign Affairs Committee.

=== Caucus memberships ===
- Composites Caucus (co-chair)
- Counter-Kleptocracy Caucus (co-chair)
- Congressional United Kingdom Caucus (co-chair)
- Congressional French Caucus (co-chair)
- European Union Caucus (founder and co-chair)
- Congressional Caucus on Korea (co-chair)
- Congressional Caucus on Turkey and Turkish Americans
- Congressional Ukraine Caucus
- House Ethiopian-American Caucus (co-chair)
- Bulgaria Caucus (co-chair)
- Friends of Belarus Caucus (co-chair)
- Congressional Caucus on U.S.-Türkiye Relations and Turkish Americans (co-chair)
- Congressional Bangladesh Caucus (co-chair)
- Congressional Afghan Caucus (co-chair)
- Congressional Caucus on Qatari-American Strategic Relationships (co-chair)
- House Republican Israel Caucus (co-chair)
- Diabetes Caucus
- Global Health Caucus
- India Caucus
- United States Congressional International Conservation Caucus
- Congressional Taiwan Caucus
- Israel Allies Caucus
- Russia Democracy Caucus
- Sportsmen's Caucus
- House Republican Policy Committee
- Tea Party Caucus
- Congressional Arts Caucus
- Congressional Constitution Caucus
- Afterschool Caucuses
- Congressional NextGen 9-1-1 Caucus
- Congressional Motorcycle Caucus
- Congressional Wildlife Refuge Caucus
- Rare Disease Caucus
- Republican Study Committee

Like his former boss, Spence, Wilson is an ardent social and fiscal conservative.

In 2003, Wilson voted for the Medicare Prescription Drug, Improvement, and Modernization Act, including its Section 1011 authorizing $250,000 annually of taxpayer money to reimburse hospitals for treatment of illegal immigrants. In 2009, he changed to his current position of opposing public funds for health care of illegal immigrants.

=== Legislation ===
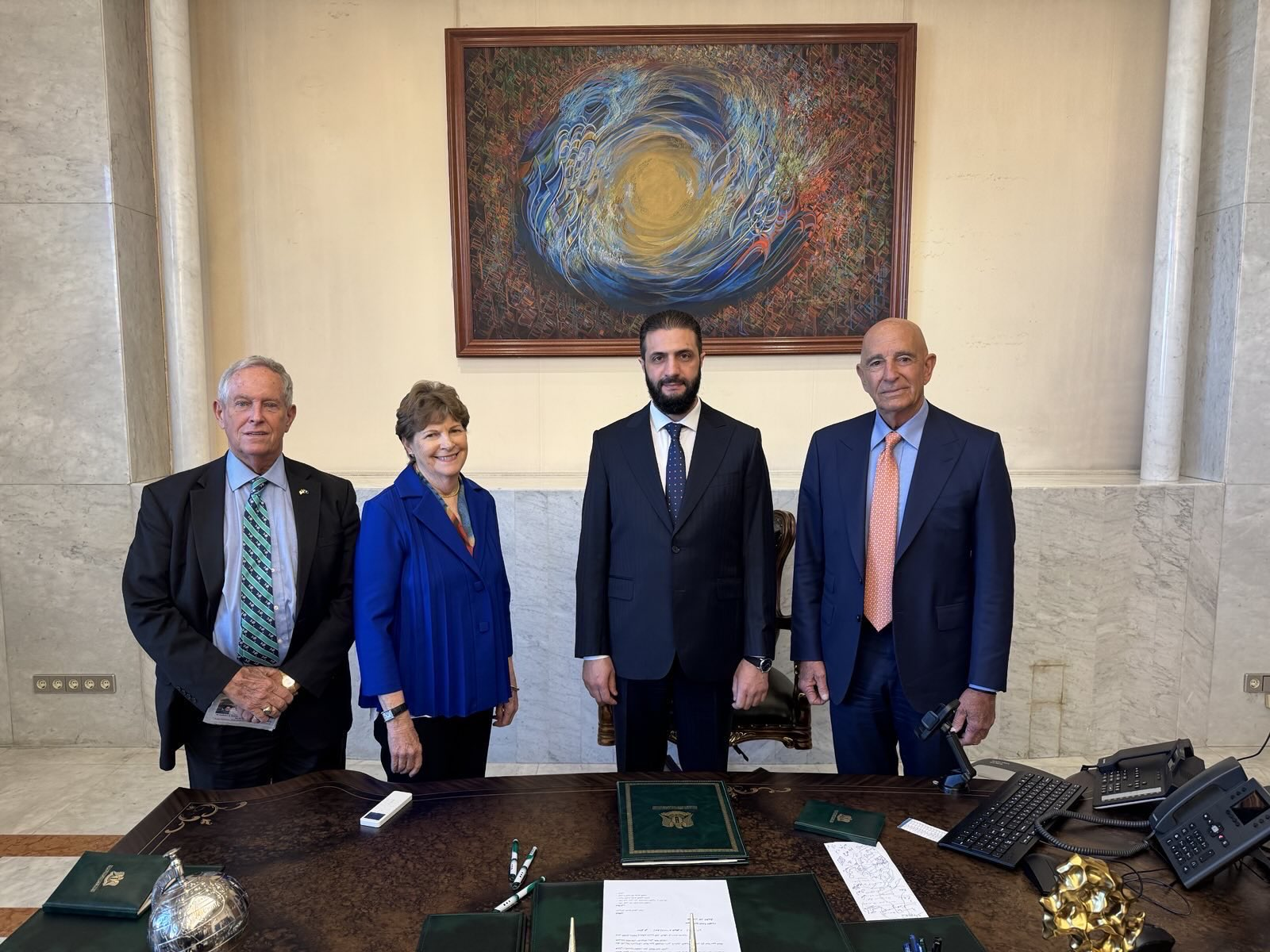
Wilson, U.S. Senator Jeanne Shaheen, and U.S. envoy to Syria Tom Barrack meet with Syrian President Ahmed al-Sharaa, August 2025

Wilson has sponsored and co-sponsored a number of bills concerning teacher recruitment and retention, college campus fire safety, National Guard troop levels, arming airline pilots, tax credits for adoptions, tax credits for living organ donors, and state defense forces. As of January 2006, eight bills he co-sponsored have passed the House, including H.R. 1973, the Senator Paul Simon Water for the Poor Act of 2005, making safe water and sanitation an objective of U.S. assistance to developing countries.

Wilson is a staunch advocate of a federal prohibition of online poker. In 2006, he co-sponsored H.R. 4411, the Goodlatte-Leach Internet Gambling Prohibition Act, and H.R. 4777, the Internet Gambling Prohibition Act.

Wilson initiated the Drafting Business Expensing Act of 2003, which allows businesses to immediately write off 50% of the cost of business equipment and machinery. This bonus depreciation provision was extended for 2008 and 2009 in two separate stimulus bills. He also spearheaded the Drafting Teacher Recruitment and Retention Act of 2003, which offers higher education loan forgiveness to math, science and special education teachers in schools with predominantly low-income student populations. He cites as his most important vote the Jobs and Growth Tax Relief Reconciliation Act of 2003.

In 2015, Wilson cosponsored a resolution to amend the Constitution to ban same-sex marriage.

Wilson sponsored H.R. 6202, the American Tech Workforce Act of 2021, introduced by Representative Jim Banks. The legislation would establish a wage floor for the high-skill H-1B visa program, thereby significantly reducing employer dependence on the program. The bill would also eliminate the Optional Practical Training program that allows foreign graduates to stay and work in the United States.

In 2023, Wilson introduced H.R. 3202, the Assad Regime Anti-Normalization Act of 2023. The act would extend the Caesar sanctions until 2032 and prevent the United States from recognizing or dealing with Ba'athist Syria. The act was passed by the House in 2024. Following the fall of the Assad regime, Wilson called for the lifting of sanctions related to the economy, investment, and reconstruction.

=== Political positions ===
In 2025, Wilson tweeted that the Iraqi judiciary was allegedly being controlled by "Iranian puppets," specifically referring to Judge Faiq Zaidan. He questioned the legitimacy of Zaidan's rulings within the Iraqi Constitution and called for what he deemed "Iraq's liberation from Iranian influence". These claims came after a congressional amendment proposed by Mike Waltz, labeling Zaidan as a tool of Iranian influence.

=== "You lie!" outburst during Obama address ===
Wilson's interruption of President Obama's address (at 00:15)

On September 9, 2009, during a nationally televised joint address to Congress by President Barack Obama, Wilson shouted "You lie!" after Obama, while outlining his proposal for reforming health care, said, "There are also those who claim that our reform effort will insure illegal immigrants. This, too, is false—the reforms I'm proposing would not apply to those who are here illegally."

Obama's chief of staff Rahm Emanuel immediately approached senior Republican lawmakers and asked them to identify the heckler and urge him to apologize immediately. Members of Congress from both parties condemned the outburst. "Totally disrespectful", said Senator John McCain of Wilson's utterance. "No place for it in that setting or any other and he should apologize immediately." Wilson said later in a statement:

This evening I let my emotions get the best of me when listening to the President's remarks regarding the coverage of undocumented immigrants in the health care bill. While I disagree with the President's statement, my comments were inappropriate and regrettable. I extend sincere apologies to the President for this lack of civility.

Obama accepted his apology. "I'm a big believer that we all make mistakes", he said. "He apologized quickly and without equivocation and I'm appreciative of that."

House Democrats called on Wilson to issue a formal apology on the House floor. House Majority Whip Jim Clyburn said, "This is about the rules of this House and reprehensible conduct." House Majority Leader Steny Hoyer said, "What is at issue here is of importance to this House and to our country ... This House ought not to stand silent."

Wilson refused to apologize to the House of Representatives, saying in a televised interview, "I believe one apology is sufficient." Congressional Republicans agreed, and opposed further action. Minority Leader John Boehner said, "I think this is a sad day for the House of Representatives ... I think this is a political stunt aimed at distracting the American people from what they really care about, which is health care." On September 15, the House approved a "resolution of disapproval" against Wilson by a 240–179 vote almost exactly along party lines.

Wilson said that his outburst reflected his view that Obama's bill would provide government-subsidized benefits to illegal immigrants. Several fact-checking organizations wrote that Wilson's view was inaccurate because HR 3200 expressly excludes undocumented aliens from receiving government-subsidized "affordability credits". The nonpartisan Congressional Research Service agreed that people would need to be lawfully present in the U.S. in order to be eligible for the credits, but noted that the bill did not bar non-citizens from buying their own health insurance coverage through the health insurance exchange. The Obama administration said that, in the final bill, undocumented immigrants would not be able to participate in the Exchange. Such language was included in the Senate Finance Committee's version of the bill, America's Healthy Future Act.

After the incident, Wilson and Democrat Rob Miller, his 2010 general election opponent, experienced a significant upswing in campaign donations. In the week after Wilson's outburst, Miller raised $1.6 million, about three times his 2008 donations, while Wilson raised $1.8 million.

=== Apology for remarks about hatred of America ===
On a 2002 live broadcast of the C-SPAN talk show Washington Journal, Wilson and Representative Bob Filner were discussing Iraqi weapons of mass destruction. When Filner noted that the U.S. provided Iraq with "chemical and biological weapons" in the 1980s, Wilson stated that this idea was "made up" and told Filner, "This hatred of America by some people is just outrageous. And you need to get over that." Wilson apologized for his remarks in statements to the press.

=== Apology for remarks about Strom Thurmond's daughter ===
In 2003, Essie Mae Washington-Williams revealed she was the daughter of Wilson's former employer, Senator Strom Thurmond, and Thurmond's black maid. Wilson was among those who publicly doubted her assertion that Thurmond had a child out of wedlock. Wilson said even if her story were true, she should not have revealed it because "it's a smear" on Thurmond's image and was a way to "diminish" Thurmond's legacy. After Thurmond's family acknowledged the truth of Washington-Williams's revelation, Wilson apologized, but said that he still thought that she should not have revealed that Thurmond was her father.

=== Texas v. Pennsylvania ===
In December 2020, Wilson was one of 126 Republican members of the House of Representatives to sign an amicus brief in support of Texas v. Pennsylvania, a lawsuit filed at the United States Supreme Court contesting the results of the 2020 presidential election, in which Joe Biden defeated incumbent Donald Trump. The Supreme Court declined to hear the case on the basis that Texas lacked standing under Article III of the Constitution to challenge the results of an election held by another state.

=== Opposition to Georgian Dream ===
In May 2024, in response to the Georgian protests of 2023–2024, Wilson introduced the MEGOBARI Act in the United States House of Representatives. The act targets Georgian Dream party officials and others deemed responsible for undermining democracy in Georgia. It also tasks U.S. government agencies with reporting to Congress on improper influence, sanctions evasion, and the activities of Russian intelligence assets in Georgia.

On December 26, 2024, Wilson wrote on X that “President Donald Trump has made it very clear where he stands on the self-professed enemies of America. If Bidzina Ivanishvili goes through with his plan to destroy Georgian democracy on December 29, he should expect a response like he’s never imagined.” He also posted, “Corrupt Bidzina Ivanishvili, a lover of China & Iran and hater of America, is trying to transform Georgia from a democracy into a dictatorship. We must put America First and cut all [funding] to Georgia if that happens.” and questioned Ivanishvili’s actions, writing, “Why did Georgia’s dictator-in-waiting Bidzina Ivanishvili give a contract to build the Anaklia Deep Sea Port to a sanctioned Chinese company? Are you ready for sanctions, Bidzina?”

On December 27, Wilson extended an invitation to President Salome Zourabichvili, recognizing her as the sole legitimate leader of Georgia, to attend the inauguration of Donald Trump. He wrote on X: "As the only legitimate leader in Georgia, I am grateful to extend an invite to President Salome Zourabichvili to attend the inauguration of President Donald Trump. I am in awe of her courage in the face of the assault by Ivanishvili and his friends in the CCP & Iranian regime."

On December 29, Wilson announced on X that he would introduce a bill in the U.S. Congress recognizing Salome Zourabichvili as the sole legitimate president of Georgia until fair re-elections are conducted in the country. He stated that the proposed legislation, titled the "Georgian Nightmare Non-Recognition Act", would prohibit U.S. recognition of the "illegal dictatorial regime" in Georgia and reaffirm Zourabichvili's legitimacy as the country's leader pending free and fair elections.

=== Other notable events ===
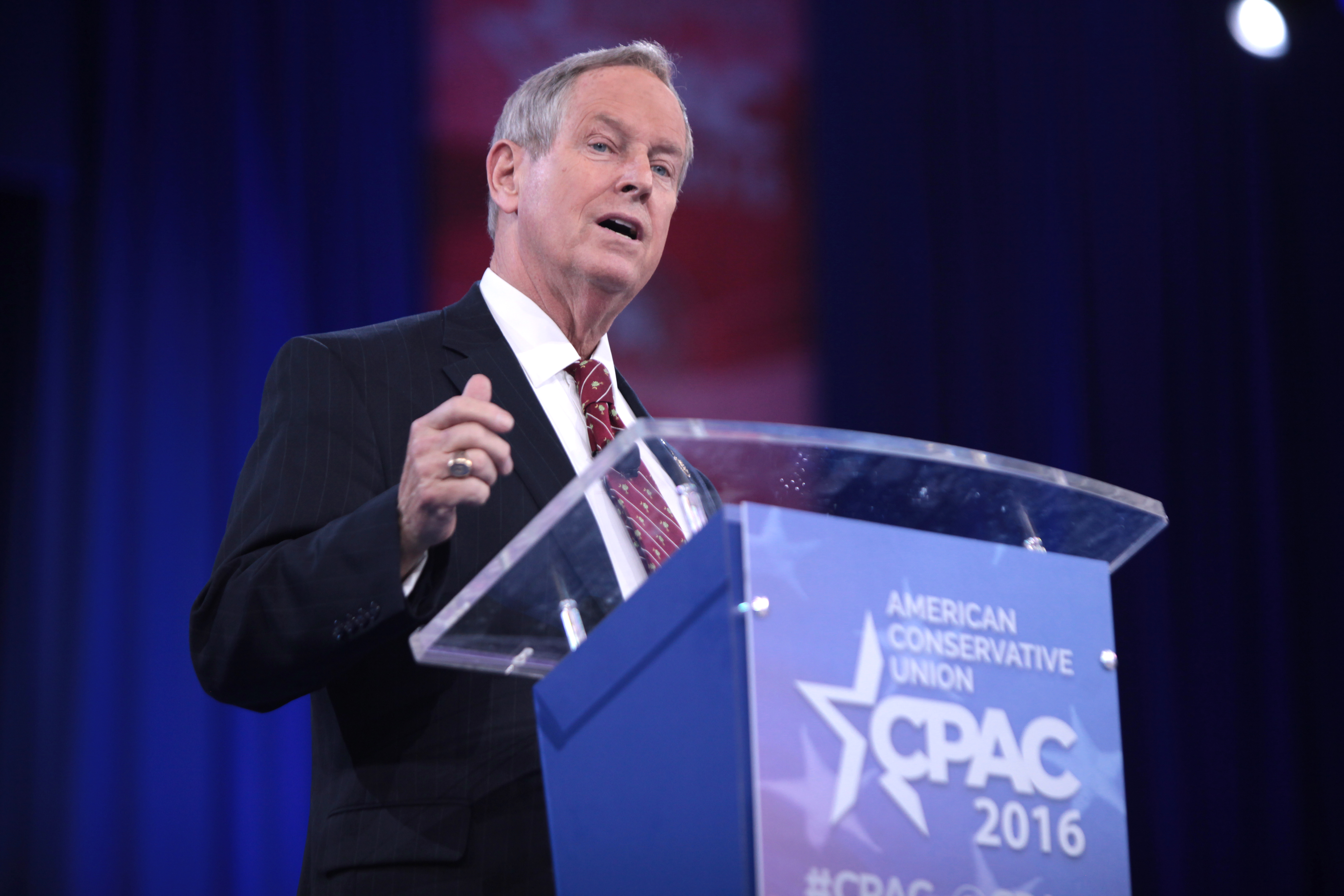
Wilson speaking at CPAC, 2016

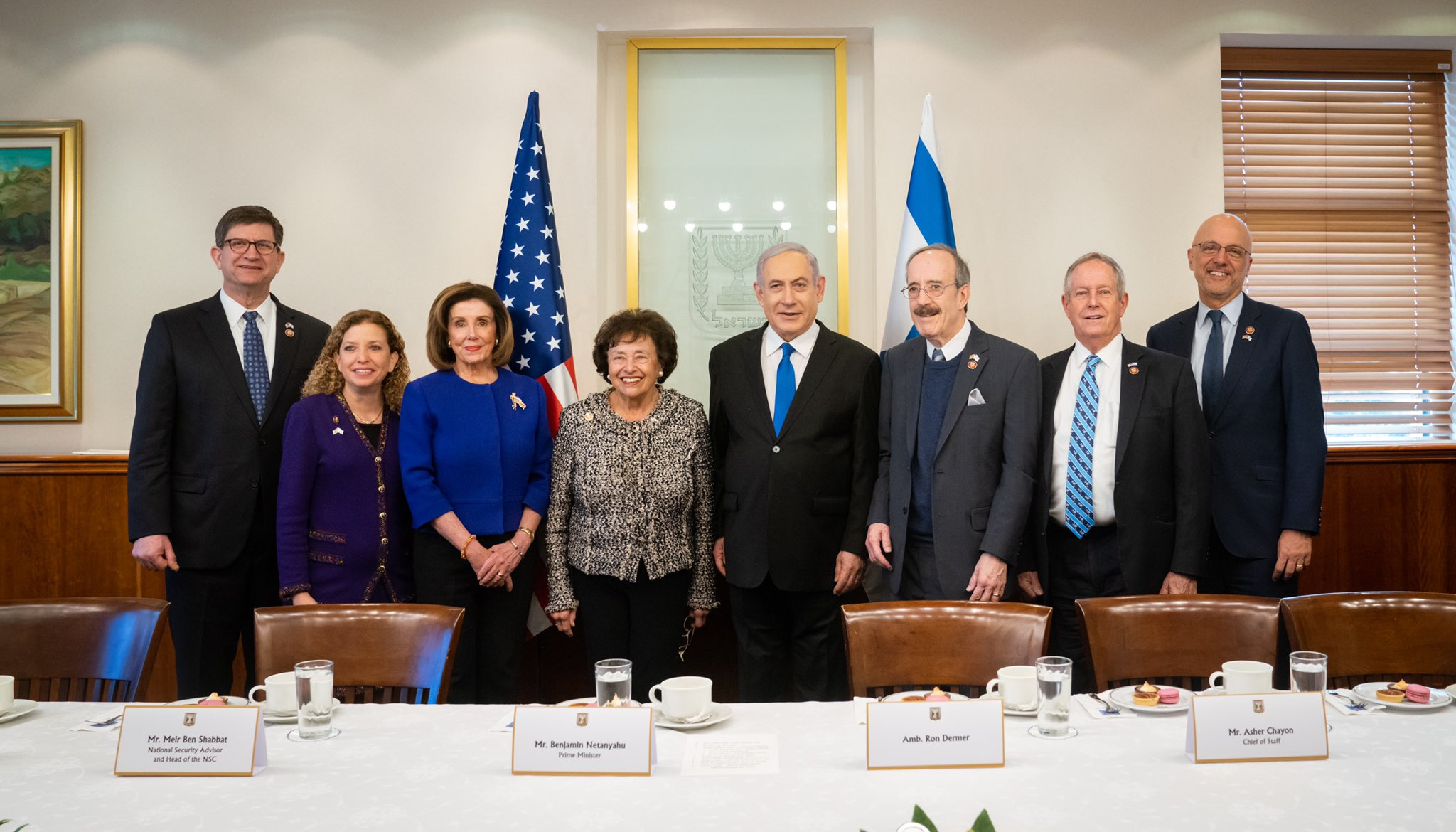
Wilson (second from right) with Israeli Prime Minister Benjamin Netanyahu (fourth from right) and Speaker Nancy Pelosi (third from left)

In November 2009, The New York Times reported that Wilson and Representative Blaine Luetkemeyer made identical written statements, reading, "One of the reasons I have long supported the U.S. biotechnology industry is that it is a homegrown success story that has been an engine of job creation in this country. Unfortunately, many of the largest companies that would seek to enter the biosimilar market have made their money by outsourcing their research to foreign countries like India." The statement was originally drafted by lobbyists for Genentech, now a Swiss biotechnology firm, but founded and still headquartered in San Francisco, California.

Wilson supported President Trump's 2017 executive order to impose a temporary ban on entry to the U.S. to citizens of seven Muslim-majority countries, saying that the order would "secure our borders and keep American families safe from terrorist attacks."

On April 10, 2017, a Wilson town hall meeting at Aiken Technical College in Graniteville, South Carolina was interrupted by activists chanting "you lie" as Wilson asserted that the Affordable Care Act was causing people to be denied health services.

In January 2023, Wilson proposed a bill to direct "the Fine Arts Board to obtain a bust of the President of Ukraine, Volodymyr Zelenskyy, for display in the House of Representatives wing of the United States Capitol".

On October 30, 2024, Columbia Airport Expressway was renamed to the Congressman Joe Wilson Expressway. The sign unveiling was attended by South Carolina Department of Transportation (SCDOT) staff and other current and former elected officials present including Attorney General of South Carolina Alan Wilson, South Carolina Secretary of Transportation Justin Powell, U.S. Congressman Ralph Norman, and Anton Gunn.

In November 2025, Wilson attacked the Russian Orthodox Church as an "extension of the Russian state," and called a group of Russian Orthodox leaders visiting the U.S. Congress for a legislative day of action as an "intelligence operation." This resulted in an outcry from some Orthodox Christian leaders, as well as critical responses from Congresswoman Anna Paulina Luna and South Carolina state representative Thomas Beach, who called the comments "actual Soviet stuff." In response to these criticisms, Wilson clarified he was referring to "the leadership of the Russian Orthodox Church Outside of Russia (ROCOR) operating under the umbrella of the Moscow Patriarchate."

== Personal life ==
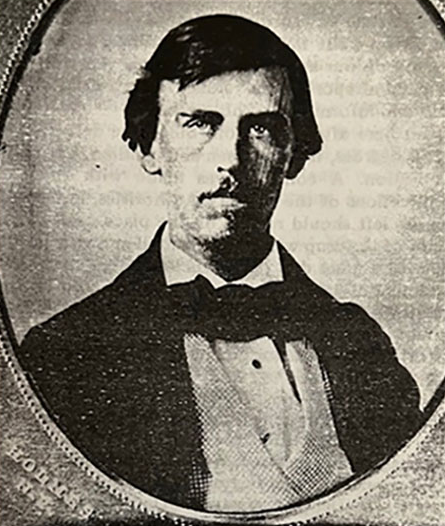
Stephen H. Boineau

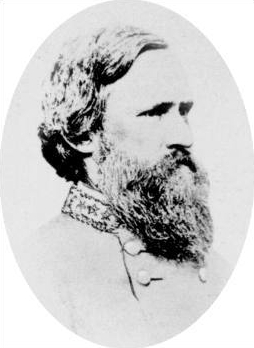
David A. Weisiger

Wilson is descended from slave-owners Stephen H. Boineau and David A. Weisiger and was named after Weisiger.

Wilson is the adoptive father of Alan Wilson, who has served as Attorney General of South Carolina since 2011, and was elected as Governor of South Carolina in the 2026 election.

Wilson was named after Confederate brigadier general David Addison Weisiger, the uncle of his great-great-grandmother. Wilson stated that Weisiger "was not a plantation owner; he was a bank cashier", but Weisiger owned seven slaves in Virginia. His great-great-grandfather Stephen H. Boineau owned 16 slaves.

In a 2005 guest article on Rediff.com, Wilson wrote that his father, Hugh, was a member of the Flying Tigers in World War II. The Wilson family attends First Presbyterian Church in Columbia.

On September 10, 2024, Wilson was hospitalized in Washington after collapsing at an event. Alan Wilson said his father was being treated for "stroke-like symptoms".

== Electoral history ==
=== South Carolina Senate (1984–2000) ===
1984 South Carolina Senate 23rd district election
Party	Candidate	Votes	%
Republican	Joe Wilson	19,144	77.85%
Democratic	Jim Leslie	2,754	11.20%
Write-in	Norma Russell	2,392	9.73%
Libertarian	Jan L. Chapman	298	1.21%
Write-in		2	0.01%
Total votes		24,590	100.00%

1988 South Carolina Senate 23rd district election
Party	Candidate	Votes	%
Republican	Joe Wilson (incumbent)	23,790	83.28%
Democratic	Frank A. Barton	4,771	16.70%
Write-in		4	0.01%
Total votes		28,565	100.00%
Republican hold			

1992 South Carolina Senate 23rd district election
Party	Candidate	Votes	%
Republican	Joe Wilson (incumbent)	27,595	99.87%
Write-in		36	0.13%
Total votes		27,631	100.00%
Republican hold			

1996 South Carolina Senate 23rd district election
Party	Candidate	Votes	%
Republican	Joe Wilson (incumbent)	26,979	100.00%
Total votes		26,979	100.00%
Republican hold			

2000 South Carolina Senate 23rd district election
Party	Candidate	Votes	%
Republican	Joe Wilson (incumbent)	35,241	100.00%
Total votes		35,241	100.00%
Republican hold			

=== 2001 Election ===
See also: List of special elections to the United States House of Representatives

Wilson was elected in 2001 in a special election caused by the death of Floyd Spence, his former boss. Wilson once said that a dying Spence called him from his hospital bed and asked him to run.

In a crowded five-way Republican primary—the real contest in this heavily Republican district—Wilson tallied 75% of the vote. He won the December 18 special election with 73% of the vote.

2001 South Carolina's 2nd congressional district special election Republican primary
Party	Candidate	Votes	%
Republican	Joe Wilson	34,646	75.51%
Republican	Joe Grimaud	6,784	14.79%
Republican	Stew Butler	1,881	4.10%
Republican	Richard Chalk	1,455	3.17%
Republican	Clide T. Cobb	1,115	2.43%
Total votes		45,881	100.00%

2001 South Carolina's 2nd congressional district special election
Party	Candidate	Votes	%
Republican	Joe Wilson	40,355	73.09%
Democratic	Brent Weaver	14,035	25.42%
Libertarian	Warren Eilertson	420	0.76%
Constitution	Steve Lefemine	404	0.73%
Write-in		1	0.00%
Total votes		55,214	100.00%
Republican hold			

=== 2002 Election ===
See also: 2002 United States House of Representatives elections in South Carolina

Wilson won election to a full term in 2002 with 84% of the vote, facing four minor-party candidates.

2002 South Carolina's 2nd congressional district election
Party	Candidate	Votes	%
Republican	Joe Wilson (incumbent)	144,149	84.12%
United Citizens	Mark Whittington	17,189	10.03%
Libertarian	James A. Legg	9,650	5.63%
Write-in		371	0.22%
Total votes		171,359	100.00%
Republican hold			

=== 2004 Election ===
See also: 2004 United States House of Representatives elections in South Carolina

Wilson was mentioned as a possible candidate for retiring Senator Fritz Hollings's seat in 2004, but decided to run for a second House term. He defeated Democratic nominee Michael Ellisor and Constitution Party nominee Steve Lefemine with 65% of the vote. Wilson got 181,862 votes to Ellisor's 93,249 and Lefemine's 4,447, with 312 write-ins.

2004 South Carolina's 2nd congressional district election
Party	Candidate	Votes	%
Republican	Joe Wilson (incumbent)	181,862	64.98%
Democratic	Michael R. Ellisor	93,249	33.32%
Constitution	Steve Lefemine	4,447	1.59%
Write-in		312	0.11%
Total votes		279,870	100.00%
Republican hold			

=== 2006 Election ===
See also: 2006 United States House of Representatives elections in South Carolina

In 2006, Wilson defeated Ellisor again, with 62.6% of the vote.

2006 South Carolina's 2nd congressional district election
Party	Candidate	Votes	%
Republican	Joe Wilson (incumbent)	127,811	62.64%
Democratic	Michael R. Ellisor	76,090	37.29%
Write-in		151	0.07%
Total votes		204,052	100.00%
Republican hold			

=== 2008 Election ===
See also: 2008 United States House of Representatives elections in South Carolina

In 2008, Wilson was reelected, defeating the Democratic nominee, Iraq War veteran Rob Miller, 54% to 46%. He survived by winning his home county, Lexington, by 33,000 votes, more than the overall margin of 26,000 votes.

2008 South Carolina's 2nd congressional district Republican primary
Party	Candidate	Votes	%
Republican	Joe Wilson (incumbent)	44,783	85.12%
Republican	Phil Black	7,831	14.88%
Total votes		52,614	100.00%

2008 South Carolina's 2nd congressional district election
Party	Candidate	Votes	%
Republican	Joe Wilson (incumbent)	184,583	53.74%
Democratic	Rob Miller	158,627	46.18%
Write-in		276	0.08%
Total votes		343,486	100.00%
Republican hold			

=== 2010 Election ===
See also: 2010 United States House of Representatives elections in South Carolina

Challenged by Miller, Libertarian nominee Eddie McCain, and Constitution Party nominee Marc Beaman, Wilson was reelected in 2010 with 53% of the vote.

2010 South Carolina's 2nd congressional district Republican primary
Party	Candidate	Votes	%
Republican	Joe Wilson (incumbent)	64,973	83.41%
Republican	Phil Black	12,923	16.59%
Total votes		77,896	100.00%

2010 South Carolina's 2nd congressional district election
Party	Candidate	Votes	%
Republican	Joe Wilson (incumbent)	138,861	53.48%
Democratic	Rob Miller	113,625	43.76%
Libertarian	Eddie McCain	4,228	1.63%
Constitution	Marc Beaman	2,856	1.10%
Write-in		102	0.04%
Total votes		259,672	100.00%
Republican hold			

=== 2012 Election ===
See also: 2012 United States House of Representatives elections in South Carolina

Redistricting made the 2nd smaller. It lost Beaufort and Hilton Head Island. It absorbed all of Aiken County and a slice of Orangeburg County.

In the general election, Wilson ran unopposed and was reelected with 96% of the vote.

2012 South Carolina's 2nd congressional district Republican primary
Party	Candidate	Votes	%
Republican	Joe Wilson (incumbent)	23,062	80.58%
Republican	Phil Black	5,557	19.42%
Total votes		28,619	100.00%

2012 South Carolina's 2nd congressional district election
Party	Candidate	Votes	%
Republican	Joe Wilson (incumbent)	196,116	96.27%
Write-in		7,602	3.73%
Total votes		203,718	100.00%
Republican hold			

=== 2014 Election ===
See also: 2014 United States House of Representatives elections in South Carolina

Challenged by Democratic nominee Phil Black and Labor Party nominee Harold Geddings III, Wilson was reelected in 2014 with 62% of the vote.

2014 South Carolina's 2nd congressional district Republican primary
Party	Candidate	Votes	%
Republican	Joe Wilson (incumbent)	43,687	81.61%
Republican	Eddie McCain	9,842	18.39%
Total votes		53,529	100.00%

2014 South Carolina's 2nd congressional district election
Party	Candidate	Votes	%
Republican	Joe Wilson (incumbent)	121,649	62.45%
Democratic	Phil Black	68,719	35.28%
Labor	Harold Geddings III	4,158	2.13%
Write-in		282	0.14%
Total votes		194,808	100.00%
Republican hold			

=== 2016 Election ===
See also: 2016 United States House of Representatives elections in South Carolina

Challenged by Democratic nominee Arik Bjorn and American Party nominee Eddie McCain, Wilson was reelected in 2016 with 60% of the vote.

2016 South Carolina's 2nd congressional district election
Party	Candidate	Votes	%
Republican	Joe Wilson (incumbent)	183,746	60.25%
Democratic	Arik Bjorn	105,306	34.53%
Green	Arik Bjorn	4,146	1.36%
Total	Arik Bjorn	109,452	35.89%
American	Eddie McCain	11,444	3.75%
Write-in		354	0.12%
Total votes		304,996	100.00%
Republican hold			

=== 2018 Election ===
See also: 2018 United States House of Representatives elections in South Carolina

Challenged by Democratic nominee Sean Carrigan and American Party candidate Sonny Narang, Wilson was reelected in 2018 with 56.3% of the vote.

2018 South Carolina's 2nd congressional district election
Party	Candidate	Votes	%
Republican	Joe Wilson (incumbent)	144,642	56.25%
Democratic	Sean Carrigan	109,199	42.47%
American	Sonny Narang	3,111	1.21%
Write-in		187	0.07%
Total votes		257,139	100.00%
Republican hold			

=== 2020 Election ===
See also: 2020 United States House of Representatives elections in South Carolina

Challenged by Democratic nominee Adair Ford Boroughs and Constitution Party candidate Kathleen K Wright, Wilson was reelected in 2020 with 55.66% of the vote.

2020 South Carolina's 2nd congressional district Republican primary
Party	Candidate	Votes	%
Republican	Joe Wilson (incumbent)	55,557	74.12%
Republican	Michael Bishop	19,397	25.88%
Total votes		74,954	100.00%

2020 South Carolina's 2nd congressional district election
Party	Candidate	Votes	%
Republican	Joe Wilson (incumbent)	202,715	55.66%
Democratic	Adair Ford Boroughs	155,118	42.59%
Constitution	Kathleen K. Wright	6,163	1.69%
Write-in		219	0.06%
Total votes		364,215	100.00%
Republican hold			

=== 2022 Election ===
See also: 2022 United States House of Representatives elections in South Carolina

Challenged by Democratic nominee Judd Larkins, Wilson was reelected in 2022 with 60.1% of the vote.

2022 South Carolina's 2nd congressional district election
Party	Candidate	Votes	%
Republican	Joe Wilson (incumbent)	147,699	60.01%
Democratic	Judd Larkins	98,081	39.85%
Write-in		346	0.14%
Total votes		246,126	100.00%
Republican hold			

=== 2024 Election ===
See also: 2024 United States House of Representatives elections in South Carolina

Challenged by Democratic nominee David Robinson, Wilson was reelected in 2024 with 59.5% of the vote.

2024 South Carolina's 2nd congressional district Republican primary
Party	Candidate	Votes	%
Republican	Joe Wilson (incumbent)	34,292	73.9%
Republican	Hamp Redmond	12,085	26.1%
Total votes		46,377	100.0%

2024 South Carolina's 2nd congressional district election
Party	Candidate	Votes	%
Republican	Joe Wilson (Incumbent)	211,514	59.5
Democratic	David Robinson	142,985	40.3
Write-in		786	0.2
Total votes		355,285	100.0
Republican hold			

=== 2026 Election ===
See also: 2026 United States House of Representatives elections in South Carolina

The 2026 election results advanced to an automatic recount, as directed by state law, Wilson defeated Khalifa by 0.99 percentage points.

2026 South Carolina's 2nd congressional district Republican primary
Party	Candidate	Votes	%
Republican	Joe Wilson (incumbent)	46,588	74.2%
Republican	Hamp Redmond	8,731	13.9%
Republican	Sam Gibbons	7,440	11.9%
Total votes		62,759	100.0%

2026 South Carolina's 2nd congressional district election
Party	Candidate	Votes	%
Republican	Joe Wilson (incumbent)	147,791	49.82%
Democratic	Zyon Khalifa	144,865	48.83%
SCWP	Dayna Alane Smith	3,674	1.24%
Write-in		334	0.11%
Total votes		296,664	100.00%
hold			

== See also ==
- List of United States representatives expelled, censured, or reprimanded

U.S. House of Representatives
Preceded by Floyd Spence	Member of the U.S. House of Representatives from South Carolina's 2nd congressional district 2001–present	Incumbent
Preceded by Ben Cardin	Chair of the Joint Helsinki Commission; 2023–2025	Succeeded by Roger Wicker
U.S. order of precedence (ceremonial)
Preceded by Stephen Lynch	United States representatives by seniority 36th	Succeeded by John Carter
Preceded by Stephen Lynch	Order of precedence of the United States	Succeeded by Mike Turner
