= Joe McEachern =

American politician (born 1955)

Member of the South Carolina House of Representatives from the 77th district
- In office 2009–2019
- Preceded by: John L. Scott Jr.
- Succeeded by: Kambrell Garvin

Personal details
- Born: April 10, 1955 (age 71) Dillon, South Carolina, United States
- Party: Democratic

Joseph A. McEachern (born April 10, 1955) is an American politician. He was a member of the South Carolina House of Representatives from the 76th District, serving from 2009 to 2018. He is a member of the Democratic party.
