= Luther L Taylor Jr =

American politician

Luther Langford Taylor Jr.

Member of the South Carolina House of Representatives from the 77th district
- In office 1983–1990
- Preceded by: Archibald Hardy
- Succeeded by: John L. Scott Jr.

Personal details
- Spouse: Carrie Lou Hollis

Luther Langford Taylor Jr (died March 23, 1997) was an American politician.

== Political career ==
Taylor served as a Democratic member for the 77th district in the South Carolina House of Representatives from 1983 to 1990. He was former deputy director of the Midlands Human Resources Development Commission, and a former chairman of the Richland County Board of Zoning Adjustment.

Taylor lost his seat as a result of Operation Lost Trust after pleading guilty to conspiracy and bribery. He was sentenced to 80 months in prison. An order by United States Federal District Court Judge Falcon B. Hawkins dismissed all charges brought against him on February 28, 1997.
