= John L. Scott Jr. =

American politician (1953–2023)

Member of the South Carolina Senate from the 19th district
- In office 2009 – August 13, 2023
- Preceded by: Kay Patterson
- Succeeded by: Tameika Isaac Devine

Member of the South Carolina House of Representatives from the 77th district
- In office 1991–2009
- Preceded by: Luther L Taylor Jr
- Succeeded by: Joe McEachern

Personal details
- Born: October 21, 1953
- Died: August 13, 2023 (aged 69) Charleston, South Carolina, U.S.
- Party: Democratic Party
- Spouse: Joan Crouch
- Children: 1
- Education: South Carolina State University
- Occupation: Realtor

John L. Scott Jr. (October 21, 1953 – August 13, 2023) was an American politician who served as a member of the South Carolina Legislature from 1991 until his death.

== Early life and career ==
Scott graduated from South Carolina State University in 1975. He was a small business owner in Columbia, South Carolina.

== Political career ==
Scott worked as a field representative for the Office of the Governor in 1975. From 1988 to 1990, he served as vice chair for Richland County Council.

=== 1990 South Carolina House of Representatives campaign ===
With the 77th district seat vacated after Operation Lost Trust, a special election was held on December 4, 1990. Scott defeated Republican Mary Fitzpatrick, and was certified and sworn in as a member of the South Carolina House of Representatives in January 1991. He completed the remainder of the unexpired term and was elected unopposed to a full term in 1992.

=== 2008 South Carolina Senate campaign ===
In 2008, Scott faced Vince Ford in the Democratic primary for South Carolina Senate Seat District 19. After the Primary, the State Board of Canvassers of the South Carolina State Election Commission ordered a recount, which took place on June 16, 2008. The recount gave Scott the primary victory. Scott went on to defeat United Citizens Party candidate Chris Nelums in the general election, and represent the 19th district in the South Carolina Senate after the retirement of Kay Patterson.

Scott served as a member of the College and University Trustee Screening Commission, a Joint Committee with members from the House and Senate. He served on the Senate Banking and Insurance; Education; Finance; Labor, Commerce and Industry; Legislative Oversight, and Medical Affairs Committees.

=== 2012 South Carolina Senate campaign ===
In 2012, Scott had no primary opponent and won unopposed in the general election.

=== 2014 United States Senate special election ===
In 2014, Scott considered running for the Democratic nomination in the United States Senate special election for the seat held by Tim Scott, before ultimately declining.

=== 2016 South Carolina Senate campaign ===
In 2016, Richland County Council Chairman Torrey Rush challenged Scott for the Senate seat. Scott won the Democratic primary with over 60% of the vote.

=== 2018 Lieutenant Governor campaign ===
In 2018, Scott was selected to serve as running mate for the office of lieutenant governor, on a ticket with Democratic gubernatorial candidate Marguerite Willis. Scott and Willis were eliminated in the Democratic primary, losing to Rep. James E. Smith Jr., and running mate Rep. Mandy Powers Norrell.

=== 2020 South Carolina Senate campaign ===
In 2020, Scott had no primary opponent and won unopposed in the general election.

== Honors and recognitions ==
In 2002, Scott was awarded the Order of the Palmetto by Governor Jim Hodges.

In 2019, Scott gave the Democratic response to the State of the State address.

In 2020, Scott received an Honorary Doctorate of Public Service from South Carolina State University.

In 2021, Scott received a Doctorate of Humane Letters from Allen University and the Marion Pinckney Carnell Award from the South Carolina Primary Health Care Association.

In 2022, Morris College opened the John L. Scott Jr. Institute of Network Information Technology and Security Lab. Scott led the South Carolina Institutes for Innovation and Information, which supports the state's seven historically black colleges and universities. He received an Honorary Doctor of Laws, honoris causa from Voorhees University.

In 2023, Scott was named “Legislator of the Year” by the Manufactured Housing Institute of South Carolina and "Columbia 50 Most Influential" by Columbia Business Monthly;

== Death ==
Scott was hospitalized at the Medical University of South Carolina in Charleston on August 11, 2023, and had previously dealt with blood clot issues. He died on August 13 at the age of 69. Governor Henry McMaster announced that flags would be lowered in the late Senator's honor. On August 17, 2023, Executive Order 2023-28 was filed for that purpose.

A memorial service was held on August 19, 2023, at Bible Way Church of Atlas Road in Columbia. Over 1800 people attended, including Governor Henry McMaster, former governor Jim Hodges, Columbia Mayor Daniel Rickenmann and Richland County Sheriff Leon Lott. Some of the dignitaries giving remarks included President of the South Carolina Senate Thomas C. Alexander, former representative Jerry Govan Jr., Representative Leon Howard and deacon and retired University of South Carolina head Track and Field coach Curtis Frye.

== Posthumous honors and recognitions ==
In November 2023, Scott was inducted into the Voorhees University Hall of Fame.

In February 2024, the South Carolina House of Representatives passed Resolution 5184 honoring Scott.

In February 2024, Richland One Board of School Commissioners inducted Scott into the Richland One Hall of Fame.

Scott was named one of the 2025 honorees in the 2025 South Carolina African American History Calendar

== Special Election ==
A special election was held to fill Scott's unexpired term. On August 22, the Office of the President of the South Carolina Senate announced that the date of the special election would be January 2, 2024.

Filing took place between September 1 and 9, 2023, with primaries held on October 24 and a run-off on November 7. At the close of the filing period, seven candidates had filed: former South Carolina Democratic Party Black Caucus Chair Johnnie Cordero, State House of Representative member Kambrell Garvin, Broad River Business Alliance President Javar Juarez and former City of Columbia Councilwoman Tameika Isaac Devine for the Democratic Primary, and Independence Party candidate Michael A. Addison, United Citizens Party candidate Chris Nelums, and Republican Party candidate Kizzy Smalls.

On October 24, Isaac Devine won the Democratic primary, and went on to defeat Addison, Nelums and Smalls in the January 2024 special election.

South Carolina House of Representatives
| Preceded by Luther L Taylor Jr | Member of the South Carolina House of Representatives from the 77th district 1991–2009 | Succeeded by Joe McEachern |
South Carolina Senate
| Preceded by Kay Patterson | Member of the South Carolina Senate from the 19th district 2009–2023 | Succeeded by Tameika Isaac Devine |
