= Harold Edward Taylor =

American politician (1938–2020)

Member of the South Carolina House of Representatives from the 77th district
- In office 1975–1980
- Preceded by: Weston Adams (diplomat)
- Succeeded by: Archibald Hardy

Personal details
- Born: October 6, 1938 Columbia, South Carolina, US
- Died: January 27, 2020 (aged 81) Florence, South Carolina, US
- Spouse: Patricia Harrelson

Harold Edward Taylor (October 6, 1938 – January 27, 2020) was an American politician who served as a member of the South Carolina Legislature from 1975 until 1980.

== Political career ==
Taylor served from 1975 to 1980 in the South Carolina House of Representatives. He also served in the US Navy.
