= Lonnie Randolph Jr. =

American civil rights activist (1950–2024)

- Born: June 3, 1940; Columbia, South Carolina, U.S.
- Died: October 19, 2024 (aged 74); Columbia, South Carolina, U.S.
- Occupations: Optometrist; civil rights leader
- Spouse: Patricia Reuben

Lonnie Randolph Jr. (June 3, 1950 – October 19, 2024) was an American physician and civil rights activist who led the National Association for the Advancement of Colored People (NAACP) in South Carolina, known as the South Carolina Conference of NAACP, for fourteen years.

== Early life and education. ==
Randolph was born in Columbia, South Carolina, and graduated from Dreher High School. He received a degree in biology from Benedict College and a Doctorate of Optometry from the Southern College of Optometry.

== Career and volunteerism ==
Randolph practiced optometry through his private practice in Columbia for over forty years, and also provided services at the South Carolina Departments of Corrections and Juvenile Justice. He served as president of the South Carolina Optometric Association, and founded Palmetto Health's free eye clinic.

== NAACP leadership ==
Randolph is recognized for his role in the removal of the Confederate flag from the dome of the South Carolina State House, chairing the committee that led on the flag issue. He continued pressure until the flag was removed from the State House grounds after the Charleston church shooting in 2015.

After Governor Nikki Haley signed legislation in July 2015 removing the flag from the State House grounds, Randolph publicly noted that the NAACP had continued to press for that removal after the decision to move the flag from the dome to the grounds, especially in the form of boycotts of athletic events in South Carolina by the Atlantic Coast Conference (ACC), the National Collegiate Athletics Association (NCAA) and the Southeastern Conference (SEC). The boycotts were officially ended by the NAACP in July 2015.

In 2000, Randolph also helped launch the Martin Luther King Jr. observance titled 'King Day at the Dome', originally billed 'A March and Rally for the Removal of the Confederate Flag', a nearly 50,000 strong protest against the Confederate flag flying atop the State House. The protest, started at Zion Baptist Church, a National Register of Historic Places site due to its activities during the Civil Rights movement, included a march down Main Street and ended with a keynote speech at the South Carolina State House from NAACP national president Kweisi Mfume. The year 2016 marked the first King Day at the Dome without the Confederate flag flying on the grounds. The event has become an annual South Carolina NAACP event, and a regular stop for Presidential candidates.

King Day was not an official holiday in South Carolina at the time of this first march in 2000. Governor Jim Hodges signed a bill into law in May 2000 which combined state recognition of the King holiday with Confederate Memorial Day. The NAACP issued a statement opposing the bill. South Carolina was the last state to officially recognize the King holiday.

== Personal life and death ==
Randolph was married to Patricia Reuben.

Randolph died in Columbia, South Carolina, on October 19, 2024, at the age of 74.

Governor Henry McMaster issued an Executive Order to have flags lowered in South Carolina in his honor.

Speakers at Randolph's celebration of life on November 1, 2024, included Brenda Murphy, President of the South Carolina Conference of NAACP along with a representative of the NAACP National Board; Bishop William Barber II; South Carolina House of Representatives member Leon Howard and South Carolina Senator and Pastor Darrell Jackson, Sr.

== Awards and honors ==
- Benedict College Hall of Fame, 1994
- Order of the Palmetto, 2011
- South Carolina NAACP President Emeritus Medal, 2017
- South Carolina Optometric Physicians Association Optometrist of the Year, 2017
- Richland County School District One Hall of Fame, 2020
- South Carolina African American History Calendar Honoree, 2024

== See also ==
- Modern display of the Confederate battle flag
- Charleston church shooting
- Bill Cotty
- Kay Patterson
