= I. DeQuincey Newman =

American politician

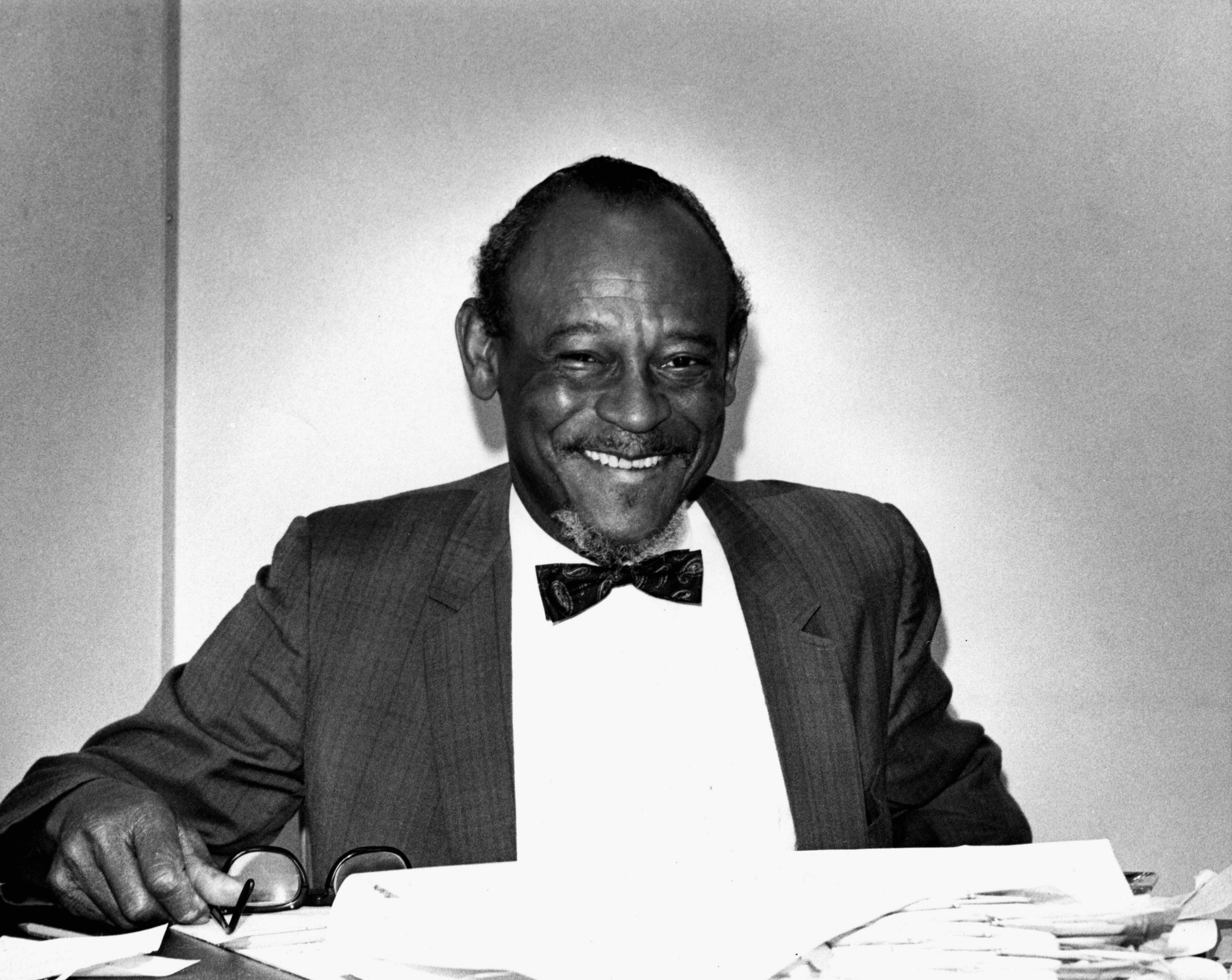

Member of the South Carolina Senate from the 19th district
- In office 1983–1985
- Preceded by: Alex Sanders
- Succeeded by: Kay Patterson

State Field Director, South Carolina NAACP
- In office 1960–1969
- Preceded by: Hudson D. Anderson
- Succeeded by: Isaac W. Williams

Personal details
- Born: Isaiah DeQuincey Newman; April 17, 1911 Darlington County, South Carolina, US
- Died: July 31, 1985 (aged 74) Columbia, South Carolina, US
- Resting place: Greenlawn Memorial Park, Columbia
- Party: Democratic (1958–1985)
- Other political affiliations: Republican (until 1958)
- Spouse: Anne Pauline Hinton (m. 1937)
- Relations: Clifton Newman, nephew
- Children: Emily Morris DeQuincey
- Education: Clark College; Gammon Theological Seminary

Isaiah DeQuincey Newman (April 17, 1911 - July 31, 1985) was an American civil rights activist, Methodist pastor, and state senator from the US state of South Carolina. He is credited with assisting in the foundation of the Democratic Progressive Party, and serving as the state field director for the South Carolina National Association for the Advancement of Colored People (NAACP) from 1960 to 1969.

== Early life ==
Newman was born in Darlington County, South Carolina, to Reverend Melton C. Newman and Charlotte Elizabeth Morris. As an 8-year-old, Newman witnessed the Ku Klux Klan set fire to a caboose holding an arrested African American man. Hearing his screams, Newman begged his father to help the man. His father didn't. Newman later said that incident spurred his pursuit for a just society.

"I tell you I put that in my memory bank. I kept that in my heart for a long time and I held it against my father. There was a man being burned alive, and my father wouldn't turn a hand to help him. Of course, I learned since then had he gone to give help, he would have been shot down, just killed."

He graduated from high school at Claflin College. He was ordained in the United Methodist Church in 1931. He later received a bachelor of arts degree from Clark College and a divinity degree from Gammon Theological Seminar, both in Atlanta, Georgia. He would serve in United Methodist Churches in Georgia and South Carolina for the next forty years.

== NAACP service ==
In 1943, Newman helped organize a branch of the NAACP in Orangeburg, South Carolina. He would serve in various roles within the South Carolina NAACP before becoming state field director in 1960 - a position he would serve in until 1969. His tenure saw a changing South Carolina that included such events as the Orangeburg Massacre, where the South Carolina National Guard shot and killed three South Carolina State College (now University) students.

== Political service ==
Newman was originally a member of the Republican Party, but he found himself increasingly dissatisfied with its position on segregation. Newman would be present at the first organizing convention of the Progressive Democratic Party, a black-led party with focuses on equality and desegregation. By 1958, he had switched his membership to the Democratic Party, where he served as a delegate to the 1968, 1972, and 1980 Democratic National Conventions.

After his tenure with the NAACP, Newman served as the director of the Governor's Office of Rural Development (also referred to as the Governor's Rural Regional Coordination Demonstration Project) from 1975 to 1981; this was a position that focused on combating poverty and hunger in South Carolina's rural areas.

In 1983, Newman was the first African American elected to the South Carolina State Senate since Reconstruction in 1887 when Thomas J. Reynolds and Bruce H. Williams ended their terms. In 1985, Newman resigned from the South Carolina Senate as he struggled with lung cancer and emphysema and was succeeded in a special election by South Carolina House member Kay Patterson.

== Later life and legacy ==
Newman died in Columbia on October 21, 1985. Speakers at a memorial service held for Newman in the South Carolina Senate chamber included former Governor John C. West. Newman's funeral was attended by Governor Richard Riley and former Columbia Mayor John Campbell,

In 1985, a resolution passes in the State Senate to commission a portrait of Newman.

In 1986, the Richland County Legislative Delegation and the Highway Commission dedicated South Carolina Highway 277 as the "I. DeQuincey Newman Freeway."

In 2001, the University of South Carolina created the I. DeQuincey Newman Institute for Peace and Social Justice and an endowed chair position of the same name, held in the College of Social Work.

In 2012, a historical marker was erected near the site of his home.
