= Thomas J. Reynolds =

South Carolina American politician

Thomas John Reynolds (1854–1896) was a lawyer and legislator who served in the South Carolina Senate post Reconstruction.

Reynolds was born March 28, 1854, as a slave. He was from Saint Helena Island in Beaufort County, South Carolina. Educated first in the local schools of Saint Helena Island then in Atlanta College he then attended the University of South Carolina but it closed in 1877 before he obtained a degree.

He was first elected to serve in the South Carolina Senate from 1884 until 1886 representing Beaufort County. He was then elected for a second term in 1886, and served until 1888. He served as a Republican. In 1896 he was an alternate delegate to Republican National Convention representing South Carolina. He was one of the last African Americans to serve in the South Carolina Senate in the post Reconstruction era with blacks being disenfranchised by the 1895 constitution and then a more than a ninety-year gap until the election of I. DeQuincey Newman in 1983.

He studied to be a lawyer and was admitted to the bar by the South Carolina Supreme Court December 1885. He worked in a law firm with William James Whipper.

In 1891 Reynolds was convicted of defrauding pensioners by charging illegal fees and keeping a portion of their monies.

He died sometime in 1896.

== See also ==
- African American officeholders from the end of the Civil War until before 1900
