= Bill Cotty (politician) =

American lawyer and politician

Member of the South Carolina House of Representatives from the 79th district
- In office 1995–2008
- Preceded by: Roland Shelton Corning
- Succeeded by: Anton Gunn

Personal details
- Born: August 9, 1946
- Died: July 23, 2016 (aged 69)
- Party: Republican
- Spouse: Amelia Dunlap
- Children: 3
- Occupation: Attorney

William Frank Cotty (August 9, 1946 – July 23, 2016) was an American lawyer and politician.

== Early life, education and career ==
Born in Buffalo, New York, Cotty graduated from Erskine College in 1969 and then received his law degree from University of South Carolina School of Law in 1974. He served in the South Carolina Army National Guard. He lived in Columbia, South Carolina and practiced law.

== Political career ==
=== South Carolina House ===
Cotty served in the South Carolina House of Representatives from 1995 to 2008 and was a Republican. He was instrumental in writing the legislation that brought the Confederate flag down from the top of the South Carolina State House and pushing the compromise through.

=== Previous elected office ===
Cotty served on the board of trustees of the Richland School District and was the chairman of the board. He worked in the Washington DC office of Thomas S. Gettys, US Representative for South Carolina Congressional District 3.

== Personal life ==
In 2016, Cotty died from lung cancer at his home in Columbia, South Carolina.

== See also ==
- Modern display of the Confederate battle flag
- Charleston church shooting
- Lonnie Randolph Jr.
- Kay Patterson
