= Tameika Isaac Devine =

American politician

Member of the South Carolina Senate from the 19th district
- Incumbent
- Assumed office January 8, 2024
- Preceded by: John L. Scott Jr.

Personal details
- Born: December 5, 1972 (age 53) Charlotte, North Carolina
- Party: Democratic
- Spouse: Jamie L. Devine (m. 2003)
- Children: 3
- Education: Hampton University (B.S., 1994); University of South Carolina (J.D., 1997)
- Profession: Attorney

Tameika Isaac Devine is an American attorney and politician. Since 2024, she has represented the 19th Senate District (Richland County) in the South Carolina Senate. She is a member of the Democratic Party.

== Early life, education and career ==
Isaac Devine was born on December 5, 1972 in Charlotte, North Carolina, to Henry, Jr. and Veronica M. Isaac. She graduated with a B.S. from Hampton University in 1994 and a J.D. from University of South Carolina School of Law in 1997.

Isaac Devine was an Assistant Attorney General for South Carolina. She is an attorney with Jabber and Isaac law firm in Columbia.

== Political career ==
=== Columbia City Council ===
Isaac Devine served as an At-Large City Councilwoman in Columbia from 2002 to 2021. She was the first African-American woman to serve on Columbia City Council.

=== Columbia Mayor's race ===
Isaac Devine ran for mayor in 2021, but lost to former Columbia City Councilman Daniel Rickenmann.

=== South Carolina State Senate ===
Isaac Devine was elected to represent the 19th Senate District in 2024 after Democratic incumbent John L. Scott Jr. died due to complications from a blood clot. She defeated Representative Kambrell Garvin in a Democratic primary runoff.

Isaac Devine currently serves as Vice Chair of the Richland County Legislative Delegation. She also serves on the South Carolina Senate Corrections and Penology, Family and Veterans Services, Judiciary, and Transportation committees.

In 2024, Isaac Devine was one of two women in the South Carolina State Senate.

== Personal life ==
Isaac Devine lives in Columbia, South Carolina, with her husband, Jamie. They have three children. She is a Baptist.

== Electoral history ==
Year	Office	Type	Party	Main opponent	Party	Votes for Isaac Devine				Result	Swing	Ref.
Year	Office	Type	Party	Main opponent	Party	Total	%	P.	±%	Result	Swing	Ref.
2024	S.C. Senate	Special	Democratic	Kizzie Smalls	Republican	4,568	85.96%	1st	N/A	Won	Hold	
2024	S.C. Senate	Dem. primary	Democratic	Michael Addison	Democratic	5,666	91.89%	1st	N/A	Won	N/A	

South Carolina Senate
Preceded by John L. Scott Jr.	Member of the South Carolina Senate from the 19th district 2024–present	Incumbent
