= Kambrell Garvin =

American politician

Member of the South Carolina House of Representatives from the 77th district
- Incumbent
- Assumed office November 12, 2018
- Preceded by: Joe McEachern

Personal details
- Born: October 2, 1991 (age 35) Columbia, SC, United States
- Party: Democratic
- Spouse: Monique Patton
- Education: Winthrop University; Johns Hopkins University; University of South Carolina
- Profession: Attorney

Kambrell Houston Garvin is an American injury attorney and politician from South Carolina. He serves as a Democratic member of the South Carolina House of Representatives, representing House District 77, Richland County, Columbia, SC. He was first elected in 2018.

== Early life and education ==
Kambrell Garvin was born in Columbia, SC. He was raised by his single mother, Dr. Sonji Garvin Baxter. At a young age, Garvin developed a speech impediment, and his mother changed her career path and became a speech pathologist to help her son.

Garvin studied Political Science with a minor in African American Studies and Sociology at Winthrop University, receiving a BA in 2013. He then went on to complete a Masters of Science in Education from Johns Hopkins University School of Education in 2016. He spent three years as a public school teacher in Walterboro, South Carolina.

In May 2019, Garvin received a J.D. from the University of South Carolina School of Law. He since became an attorney at McGowan, Hood & Felder, LLC. In 2022, he launched his own law firm.

== Political career ==
Garvin first got involved in politics at the age of 10, when he organized his first voter registration campaign. He participated in various political campaigns, rallies and political conventions throughout his teen and college years, mostly around education and social justice issues. He was a member of Teach for America, a non-profit organization aiming to end educational inequity.

=== South Carolina House of Representatives ===
Garvin first ran for office in 2018, when he challenged Democratic incumbent Joe McEachern in the Democratic Primaries for House District 77 when he was 26 years old. After a close first round, Garvin went on to defeat McEachern in the runoff by a 70 to 30 percent margin. Garvin then won in the General election and began his term as state representative in January 2019.

Garvin serves on the House Education and Public Works and the Legislative Oversight committees.

As state legislator, Garvin proposed a bill that would prohibit job application from including questions related to convictions of a crime. He introduced a bill to the SC House which would make it illegal to discriminate based on hair, akin to the CROWN Act in California. Garvin has served as Vice Chairman of the Richland County Legislative Delegation. He is Treasurer of the House Minority Caucus.

In December 2024, Garvin unsuccessfully challenged Todd Rutherford for House Minority Leader.

=== 2020 Presidential election ===
Garvin endorsed Elizabeth Warren in the 2020 Democratic Party presidential primaries. He became a surrogate for her campaign in the South Carolina Primary. He said he supported her for her many progressive proposals, and her student debt cancellation plan in particular.

=== 2023 State Senate District 19 Special Election ===
On August 22, following the death of District 19 Senator John L. Scott Jr., the Office of the President of the South Carolina Senate announced that the date of the special election to fill the seat would be January 2, 2024. Filing would take place between September 1 and 9, 2023, with primaries held on October 24 and a run-off set for November 7.

On August 29, 2023, Garvin announced his intention to run for State Senate District 19 seat. He officially filed on September 1, 2023. Garvin came in second place in the Democratic Primary on October 24.

== Personal life ==
Garvin is married to Monique Patton Garvin. The couple resides in Northeast Columbia, SC.
