= 2001 South Carolina's 2nd congressional district special election =

- December 18, 2001
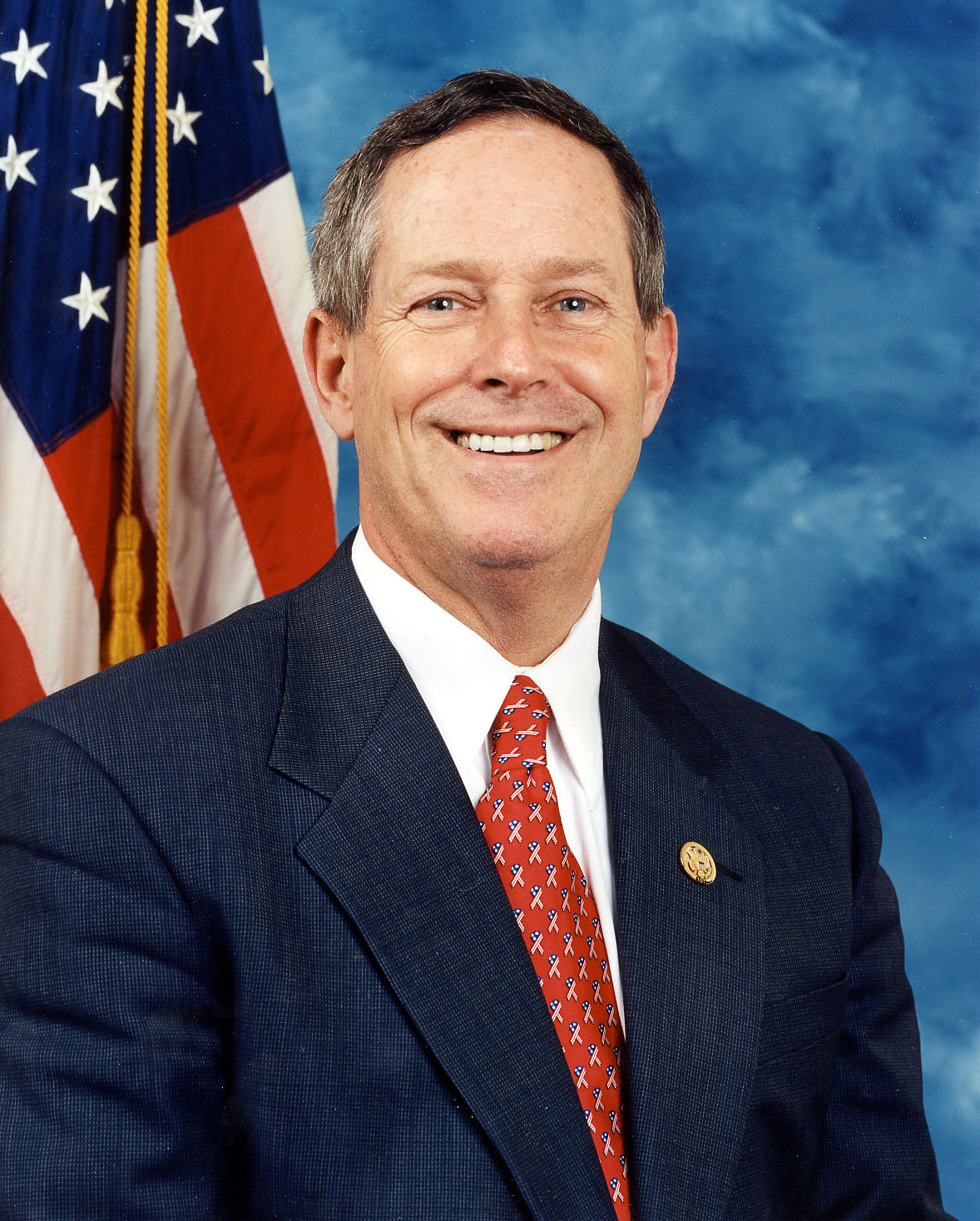

Nominee	Joe Wilson	Brent Weaver
Party	Republican	Democratic
Popular vote	40,355	14,034
Percentage	73.1%	25.4%
U.S. Representative before election
Floyd Spence
Republican
Elected U.S. Representative
Joe Wilson
Republican

The 2001 South Carolina 2nd congressional district special election was held on December 18, 2001, to select a Representative for the 2nd congressional district to serve out the remainder of the term for the 107th Congress. The special election resulted from the death of 16-term Republican incumbent Floyd Spence on August 16, 2001. Joe Wilson, a state senator from Lexington County and a former aide to Spence, won the Republican primary and went on to win the general election against Democratic challenger Brent Weaver.

== Republican primary ==
The South Carolina Republican Party held their primary on October 30, 2001. Wilson won 75 percent of the vote, avoiding a runoff election.

2001 South Carolina's 2nd congressional district special election Republican primary
Primary election
Candidate	Votes	%
Joe Wilson	34,646	75.5
Joe Grimaud	6,784	14.8
Stew Butler	1,881	4.1
Richard Chalk	1,455	3.2
Clyde T. Cobb	1,115	2.4

== General election campaign ==
The Republican Party was on the rise in South Carolina and there was a great deal of enthusiasm among its voters. Additionally, the 2nd had long been a Republican stronghold; it had been in GOP hands without interruption since a 1965 special election. Meanwhile, the Democratic Party was clearly on the decline and was expected to fare poorly in the upcoming 2002 elections. Therefore, it was generally understood that Wilson had clinched a seat in Congress with his primary victory.

As expected, Wilson scored a decisive victory in the general election and he was sworn into Congress the very next day.

=== Results ===
South Carolina's 2nd Congressional District Special Election Results, 2001
Party	Candidate	Votes	%	±%
Republican	Joe Wilson	40,355	73.1	+16.1
Democratic	Brent Weaver	14,034	25.4	−15.4
Libertarian	Warren Eilertson	420	0.8	−0.5
Constitution	Steve LeFemine	404	0.7	+0.7
No party	Write-Ins	1	0.0	0.0
Majority		26,321	47.7	+31.5
Turnout		55,214		
Republican hold				

==== By county ====
County	Joe Wilson Republican		Brent Weaver Democratic		All others		Margin		Total
County	Votes	%	Votes	%	Votes	%	Votes	%	Total
Aiken (part)	569	83.3%	106	15.5%	8	1.2%	463	67.8%	683
Allendale	272	39.7%	408	59.6%	5	0.7%	-136	-19.9%	685
Barnwell	761	59.5%	514	40.2%	5	0.4%	247	19.3%	1,280
Beaufort (part)	8,213	71.9%	3,045	26.7%	214	1.4%	5,168	45.2%	11,422
Calhoun (part)	668	62.7%	386	36.2%	11	1.1%	282	26.5%	1,065
Colleton (part)	381	71.6%	149	28.0%	2	0.4%	232	43.6%	532
Hampton	502	46.6%	568	52.7%	8	0.7%	-66	-6.1%	1,078
Jasper	548	38.2%	877	61.1%	7	0.5%	-329	-22.9%	1,436
Lexington	16,656	82.7%	3,145	15.6%	335	1.6%	13,511	67.1%	20,136
Orangeburg (part)	1,891	66.4%	926	32.5%	30	1.1%	965	33.9%	2,848
Richland (part)	9,894	70.4%	3,910	27.8%	245	1.8%	5,984	42.6%	14,049

== See also ==
- South Carolina's 2nd congressional district
