= 2006 United States House of Representatives elections in South Carolina =

- November 7, 2006

All 6 South Carolina seats to the United States House of Representatives
	Majority party	Minority party
Party	Republican	Democratic
Last election	4	2
Seats won	4	2
Seat change	Steady	Steady
Popular vote	599,615	472,719
Percentage	55.20%	43.52%
Swing	▼8.25%	▲9.72%

Republican
40–50%
50–60%
60–70%
70–80%
Democratic
50–60%
60–70%
70–80%
Winners
Republican Hold
Democratic Hold

The 2006 United States House of Representatives elections in South Carolina were held on November 7, 2006, to select six Representatives for two-year terms from the state of South Carolina. The primary elections for the Democrats and the Republicans were held on June 13 and the runoff elections were held two weeks later on June 27. All six incumbents were re-elected and the composition of the state delegation remained four Republicans and two Democrats.

== Overview ==
United States House of Representatives elections in South Carolina, 2006
Party	Votes	Percentage	Seats	+/–
Republican	599,615	55.20%	4	—
Democratic	472,719	43.52%	2	—
Green	8,847	0.81%	0	—
Libertarian	4,467	0.41%	0	—
Independents	558	0.05%	0	—
Totals	1,086,206	100.00%	6	—

== District 1 ==
2006 South Carolina's 1st congressional district election
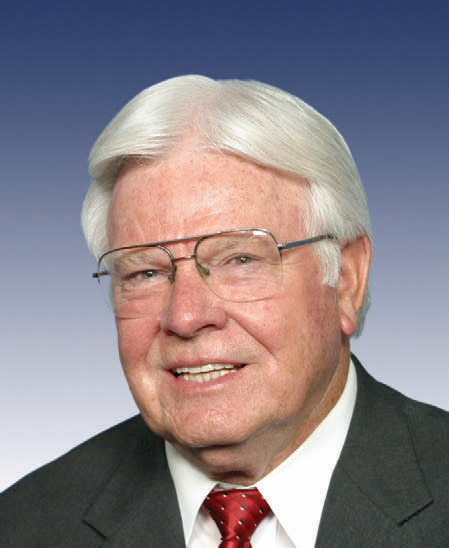

Nominee	Henry E. Brown, Jr.	Randy Maatta
Party	Republican	Democratic
Popular vote	115,766	119,779
Percentage	59.9%	37.9%
- County results Brown: 50–60% 60–70%
U.S. Representative before election
Henry E. Brown, Jr.
Republican
Elected U.S. Representative
Henry E. Brown, Jr.
Republican

Congressman Henry E. Brown, Jr. ran for a fourth term in this conservative, South Carolina coastal district and faced Democratic candidate Randy Maatta and Green Party candidate James Dunn. Though Brown was re-elected by a comfortable margin, it was a smaller margin than in previous elections.

=== Predictions ===
Source	Ranking	As of
The Cook Political Report	Safe R	November 6, 2006
Rothenberg	Safe R	November 6, 2006
Sabato's Crystal Ball	Safe R	November 6, 2006
Real Clear Politics	Safe R	November 7, 2006
CQ Politics	Safe R	November 7, 2006

South Carolina's 1st congressional district election, 2006
Party	Candidate	Votes	%
Republican	Henry E. Brown, Jr. (inc.)	115,766	59.87
Democratic	Randy Maatta	73,218	37.86
Green	James E. Dunn	4,287	2.22
Write-ins		104	0.05
Total votes		193,375	100.00
Republican hold			

== District 2 ==
2006 South Carolina's 2nd congressional district election
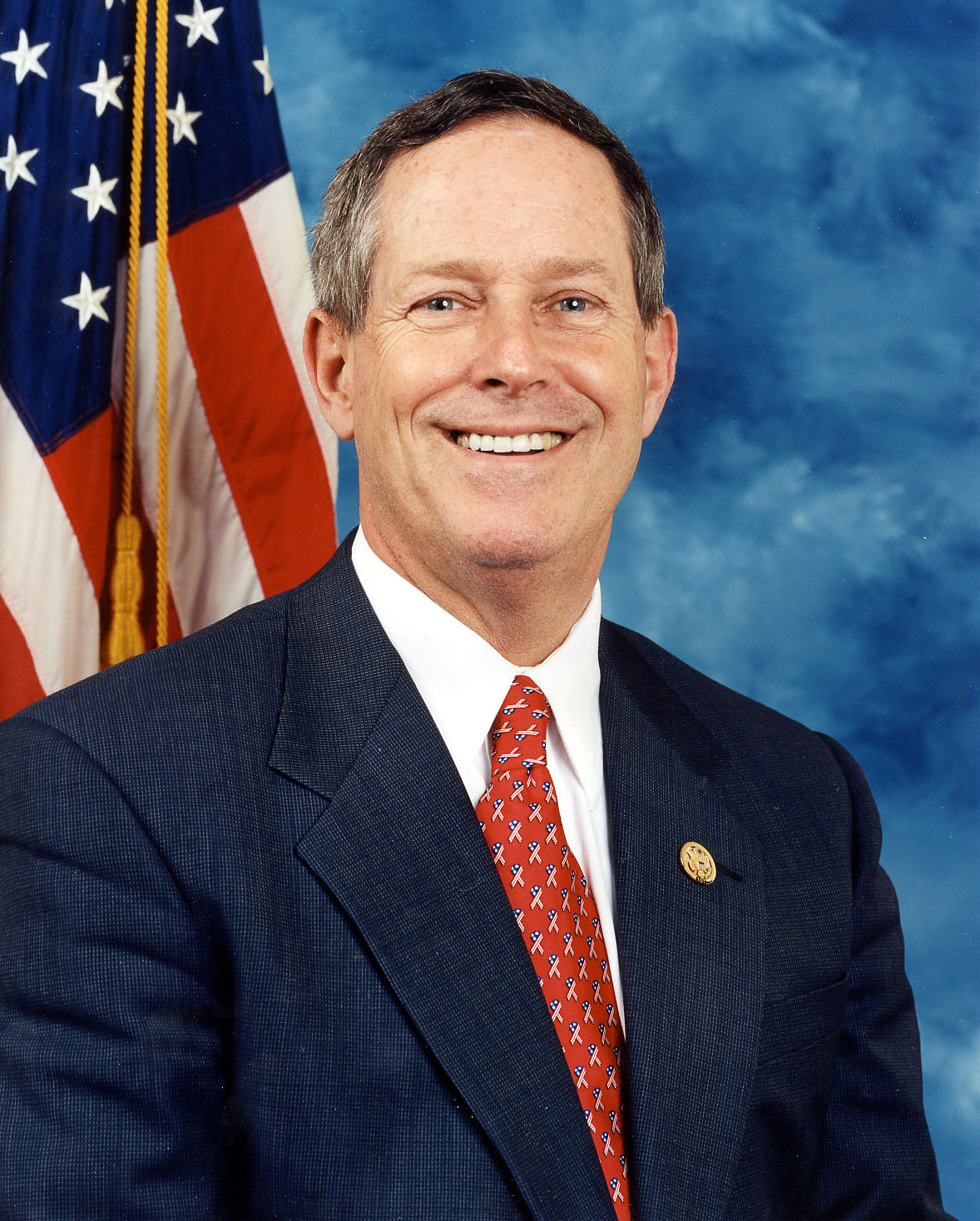

Nominee	Joe Wilson	Michael Ray Ellisor
Party	Republican	Democratic
Popular vote	127,811	76,090
Percentage	62.6%	37.3%
- County results Wilson: 50–60% 60–70% 70–80% Ellisor: 50–60% 60–70%
U.S. Representative before election
Joe Wilson
Republican
Elected U.S. Representative
Joe Wilson
Republican

Congressman Joe Wilson ran for re-election in this conservative district that starts along the South Carolina coastline and reaches into the central region of the state. Wilson faced Democratic candidate Michael Ellisor in a repeat of the 2004 election, and, though he was re-elected, his margin of victory was reduced somewhat by the Democratic wave sweeping through the country.

=== Predictions ===
Source	Ranking	As of
The Cook Political Report	Safe R	November 6, 2006
Rothenberg	Safe R	November 6, 2006
Sabato's Crystal Ball	Safe R	November 6, 2006
Real Clear Politics	Safe R	November 7, 2006
CQ Politics	Safe R	November 7, 2006

South Carolina's 2nd congressional district election, 2006
Party	Candidate	Votes	%
Republican	Joe Wilson (inc.)	127,811	62.64
Democratic	Michael Ray Ellisor	76,090	37.29
Write-ins		151	0.07
Total votes		204,052	100.00
Republican hold			

== District 3 ==
2006 South Carolina's 3rd congressional district election
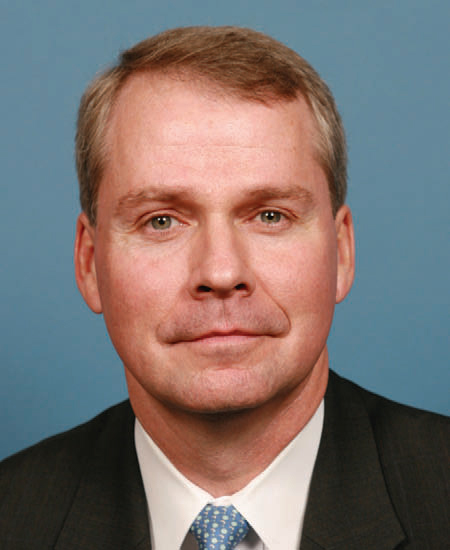

Nominee	J. Gresham Barrett	Lee Ballenger
Party	Republican	Democratic
Popular vote	111,882	66,039
Percentage	62.9%	37.1%
- County results Barrett: 50–60% 60–70% 70–80% Ballenger: 50–60%
U.S. Representative before election
J. Gresham Barrett
Republican
Elected U.S. Representative
J. Gresham Barrett
Republican

Though Congressman J. Gresham Barrett represented the most conservative district in South Carolina, he was held to just over sixty percent of the vote by Democratic candidate Lee Ballenger in 2006, in part due to the anti-Republican sentiment nationwide.

=== Predictions ===
Source	Ranking	As of
The Cook Political Report	Safe R	November 6, 2006
Rothenberg	Safe R	November 6, 2006
Sabato's Crystal Ball	Safe R	November 6, 2006
Real Clear Politics	Safe R	November 7, 2006
CQ Politics	Safe R	November 7, 2006

South Carolina's 3rd congressional district election, 2006
Party	Candidate	Votes	%
Republican	J. Gresham Barrett (inc.)	111,882	62.86
Democratic	Lee Ballenger	66,039	37.10
Write-ins		67	0.04
Total votes		177,988	100.00
Republican hold			

== District 4 ==
2006 South Carolina's 4th congressional district election
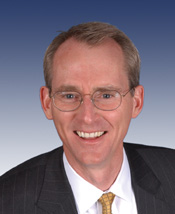

Nominee	Bob Inglis	William Griffith
Party	Republican	Democratic
Popular vote	115,553	57,490
Percentage	64.2%	32.0%
- County results Inglis: 50–60% 60–70%
U.S. Representative before election
Bob Inglis
Republican
Elected U.S. Representative
Bob Inglis
Republican

Republican Congressman Bob Inglis, seeking his fifth term overall and his second consecutive term, faced off against Democratic candidate William Griffith, Libertarian John Cobin, and Green candidate C. Faye Walters. He won re-election with over 64% of the vote. This district, based in Spartanburg and Greenville, has a tendency to elect Republicans.

=== Predictions ===
Source	Ranking	As of
The Cook Political Report	Safe R	November 6, 2006
Rothenberg	Safe R	November 6, 2006
Sabato's Crystal Ball	Safe R	November 6, 2006
Real Clear Politics	Safe R	November 7, 2006
CQ Politics	Safe R	November 7, 2006

South Carolina's 4th congressional district election, 2006
Party	Candidate	Votes	%
Republican	Bob Inglis (inc.)	115,553	64.22
Democratic	William Griffith	57,490	31.95
Libertarian	John Cobin	4,467	2.48
Green	C. Faye Walters	2,336	1.30
Write-ins		85	0.05
Total votes		179,931	100.00
Republican hold			

== District 5 ==
2006 South Carolina's 5th congressional district election
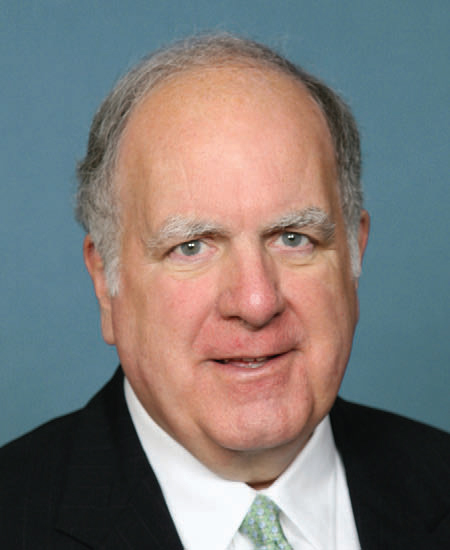

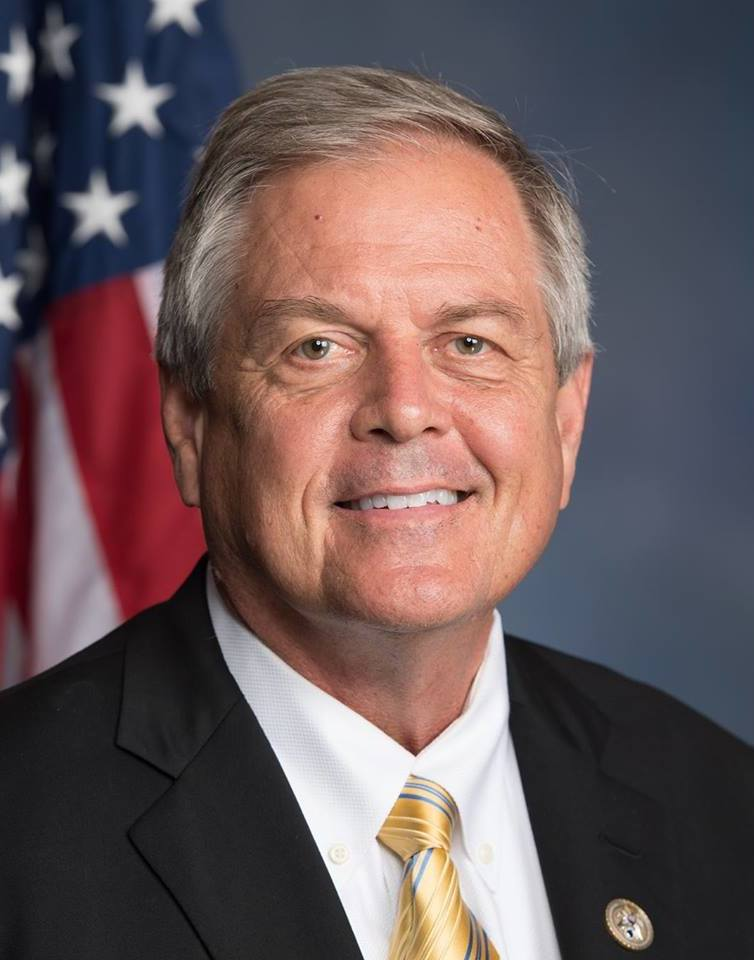
Nominee	John Spratt	Ralph Norman
Party	Democratic	Republican
Popular vote	99,669	75,422
Percentage	56.9%	43.1%
- County results Spratt: 50–60% 60–70% 70–80% Norman: 50–60%
U.S. Representative before election
John Spratt
Democratic
Elected U.S. Representative
John Spratt
Democratic

Long-serving Democratic Congressman John Spratt, in a bid for his thirteenth term, faced a credible challenge from State Representative Ralph Norman. Though Spratt's margin of victory was reduced from previous levels, he was still able to edge out Norman with nearly fifty-seven percent of the vote in this conservative, northern district.

=== Predictions ===
Source	Ranking	As of
The Cook Political Report	Likely D	November 6, 2006
Rothenberg	Safe D	November 6, 2006
Sabato's Crystal Ball	Safe D	November 6, 2006
Real Clear Politics	Safe D	November 7, 2006
CQ Politics	Likely D	November 7, 2006

South Carolina's 5th congressional district election, 2006
Party	Candidate	Votes	%
Democratic	John Spratt (inc.)	99,669	56.90
Republican	Ralph Norman	75,422	43.06
Write-ins		63	0.04
Total votes		175,154	100.00
Democratic hold			

== District 6 ==
2006 South Carolina's 6th congressional district election
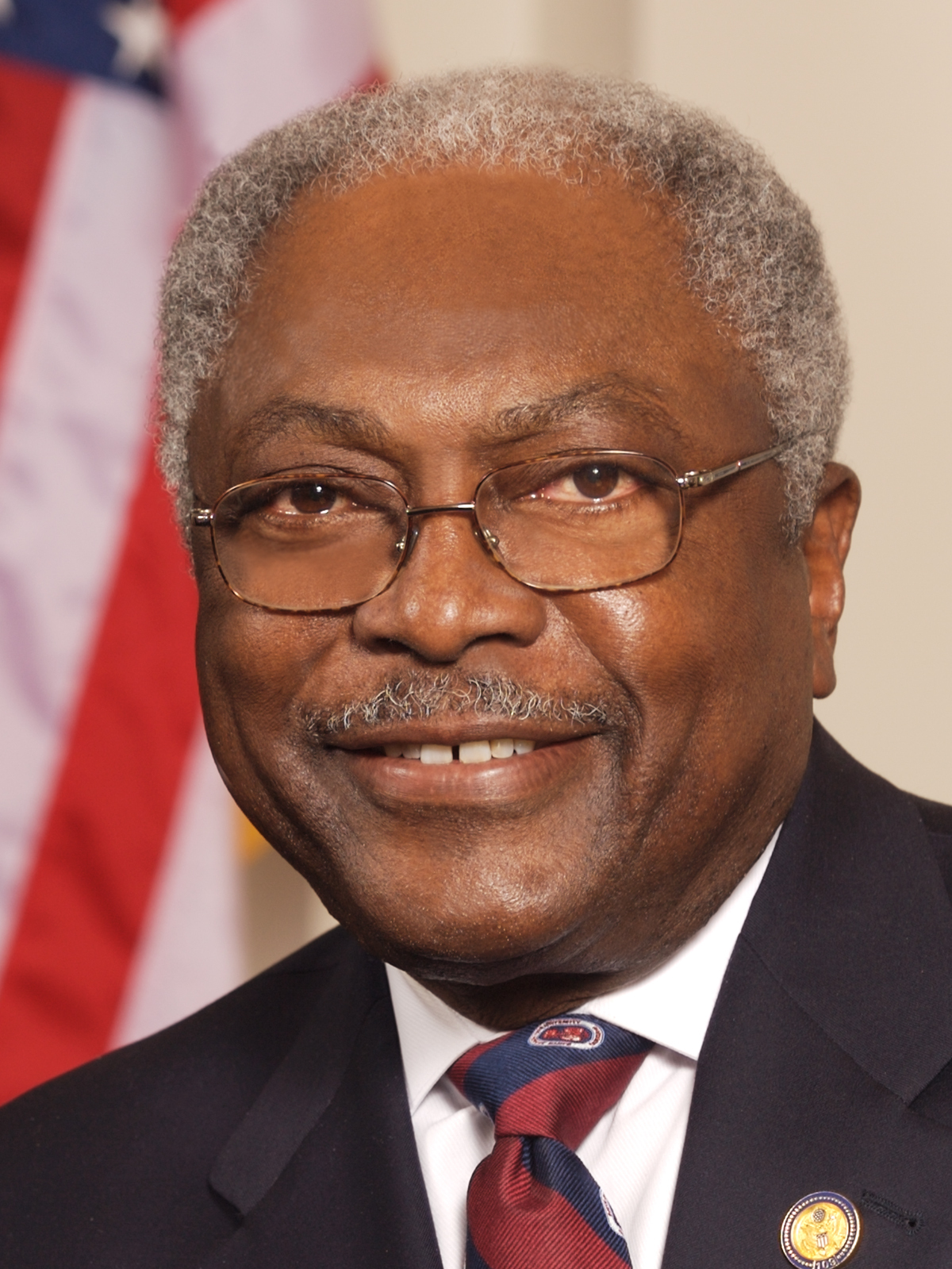

Nominee	Jim Clyburn	Gary McLeod
Party	Democratic	Republican
Popular vote	100,213	53,181
Percentage	64.4%	34.2%
- County results Clyburn: 50–60% 60–70% 70–80% 80–90% McLeod: 40–50% 50–60%
U.S. Representative before election
Jim Clyburn
Democratic
Elected U.S. Representative
Jim Clyburn
Democratic

Facing off against Republican challenger Gary McLeod for the third time in this staunchly liberal, African-American majority district, incumbent Democratic Congressman Jim Clyburn overwhelmingly won election to an eighth term in Congress.

=== Predictions ===
Source	Ranking	As of
The Cook Political Report	Safe D	November 6, 2006
Rothenberg	Safe D	November 6, 2006
Sabato's Crystal Ball	Safe D	November 6, 2006
Real Clear Politics	Safe D	November 7, 2006
CQ Politics	Safe D	November 7, 2006

South Carolina's 6th congressional district election, 2006
Party	Candidate	Votes	%
Democratic	Jim Clyburn (inc.)	100,213	64.36
Republican	Gary McLeod	53,181	34.15
Green	Antonio Williams	2,224	1.43
Write-ins		88	0.06
Total votes		155,706	100.00
Democratic hold			

== See also ==
- United States House of Representatives elections, 2006
- South Carolina gubernatorial election, 2006
- South Carolina state elections, 2006
