= Linda Ketner =

American philanthropist (born 1950)

Linda Ketner (born May 12, 1950) is a philanthropist and co-founder of the Charleston, South Carolina-based LGBTQ advocacy group Alliance for Full Acceptance. In 2008, she became the first openly gay candidate for the House of Representatives in South Carolina history when she ran as a Democrat in South Carolina's 1st Congressional District.

== Biography ==
Linda Ketner was born on May 12, 1950, in Salisbury, North Carolina, to Ralph Wright Ketner and Ruth Jones Ketner Hope. Ralph Ketner co-founded Food Town, which later became the Food Lion grocery store chain. In 2008, Ketner ran as a Democrat for South Carolina's 1st Congressional district against Republican incumbent Henry Brown. Brown won the race with 52% of the vote to Ketner's 48%, a distance of 16,000 votes. She remained popular with many Charlestonians, and publicly contemplated running for mayor of Charleston in 2013.

Ketner has been involved in volunteer and advocacy work in South Carolina with the LGBTQ community, homelessness and housing as well as racial justice. She worked with the Charleston chapter of the NAACP as a committee chair, receiving a Special Recognition Award from the group in 2013. She and her partner, Beth Huntley, did volunteer work in Pass Christian, Mississippi, after Hurricane Katrina, coordinating supplies. Ketner co-founded the Alliance for Full Acceptance in 1998 and served as president until 2004. She was cofounder and president of the South Carolina Equality Coalition (now known as SC Equality) in 2005 during the group's campaign against South Carolina Amendment 1.

In "Finding Home Without a Map," an essay published in 2018, Ketner discussed her attempts to "pray and will myself into heterosexuality" as a young woman and, after ending her marriage to a man and living as a lesbian, her long spiritual journey. "It was actually almost two decades before I could attend a traditional Christian service without weeping," she wrote. Her study of non-Christian religions and her three-year affiliation with an all-Black congregation gave her a deeper connection to God and strengthened her commitment to social justice. Ketner also noted that many LGBTQ people do not "feel that love of God that never leaves you isolated and alone. That’s the spiritual path of some gays and lesbians, but most of us have not made that journey. The tragedy of the lack of support for LGBTQ spirituality and relationship in houses of worship is that so many gays have permanently left the church and God and never make it."
