= SC Equality =

American advocacy group for LGBTQ rights

- Founded: 2002
- Type: Nonprofit organization
- Location: Columbia, South Carolina
- Region served: South Carolina
- Key people: James Agens, Executive Director
- Website: www.equalmeanseveryone.org
- Formerly called: South Carolina Equality Coalition (SCEC)

SC Equality is a nonprofit organization advocating for LGBTQ rights in South Carolina.

== History ==
SC Equality was incorporated in 2002 in Columbia, South Carolina, by Nekki Shutt as South Carolina Equality Coalition (SCEC). By 2003, the group was made up of 19 organizations, including the Alliance for Full Acceptance (AFFA). Its goal was to improve the conditions of gay and lesbian people in South Carolina through promoting tolerance, politically organizing gay people and allies and changing discriminatory laws.

SCEC was the recipient of a 2003 Equality Fund grant from the Human Rights Campaign to support its political lobbying efforts. SCEC led a major campaign against South Carolina Amendment 1, which was a ballot measure part of the 2006 election. The amendment stated that a marriage between one man and one woman would be the only valid domestic union recognized in the state. In 2005, then-chair of SCEC Linda Ketner organized public testimony against the amendment at legislative subcommittee hearings. The amendment passed the South Carolina Senate with a vote of 36–1, with Senator Robert Ford of Charleston the sole dissenting vote. SCEC and its constituent members, including AFFA and South Carolina Gay and Lesbian Pride Movement, continued to campaign against the amendment through to the election, including canvassing at the South Carolina State Fair, hosting "Fairness for All Families" fundraising house parties, and a statewide bus tour. Groups lobbying in favor of the amendment included the Palmetto Family Council, led by Henry McMaster and Oran Smith. The amendment ultimately passed with 78% of the vote.

SCEC later rebranded as SC Equality and continued its advocacy work at the state level. On June 26, 2013, SC Equality organized a march in Columbia in anticipation of the Supreme Court's decision in United States v. Windsor.
