= Jeff Duncan (politician) =

American politician (born 1966)

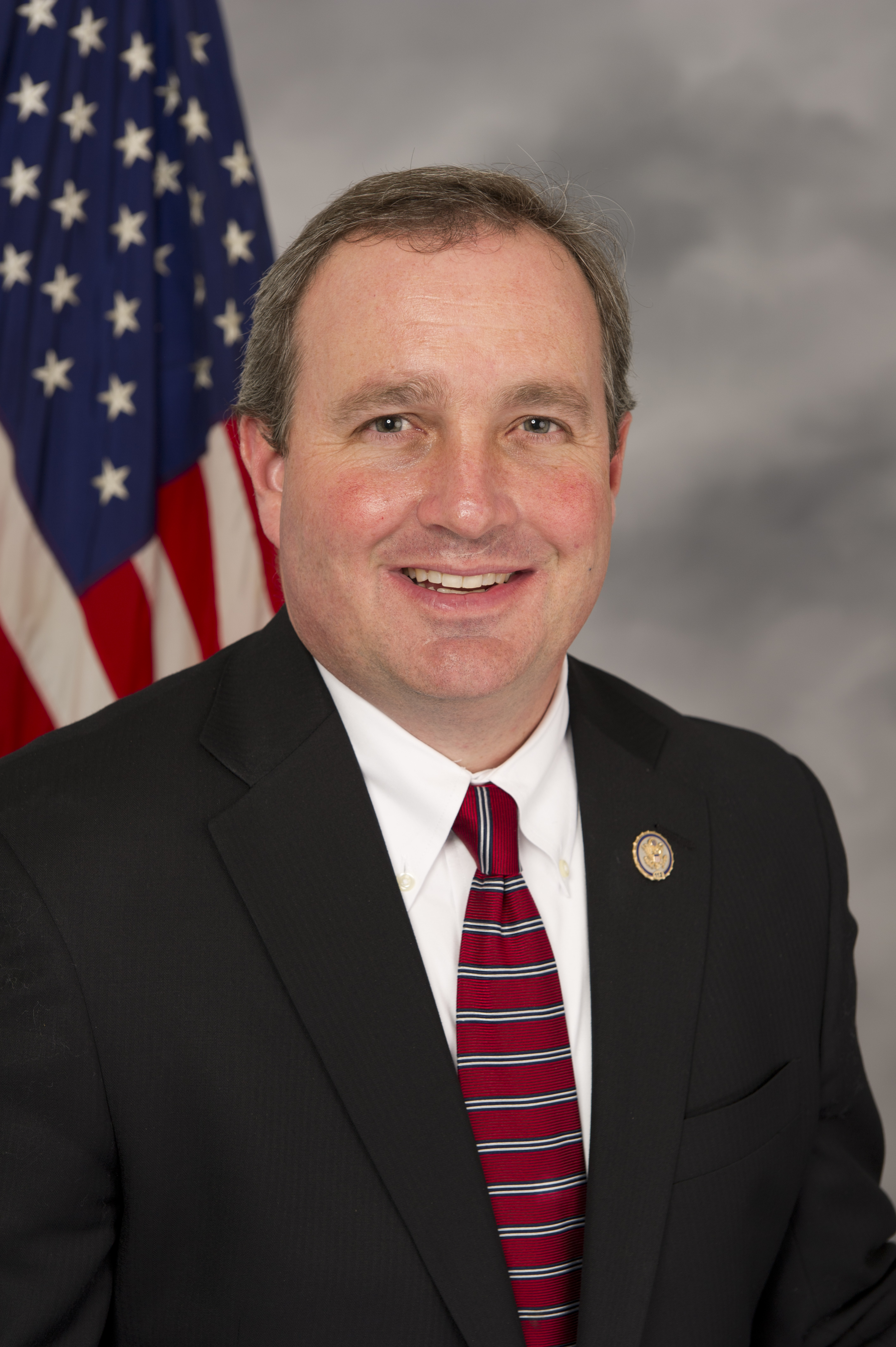
- Official portrait, 2011

Member of the U.S. House of Representatives from South Carolina's 3rd district
- In office January 3, 2011 – January 3, 2025
- Preceded by: Gresham Barrett
- Succeeded by: Sheri Biggs

Member of the South Carolina House of Representatives from the 15th district
- In office January 14, 2003 – January 3, 2011
- Preceded by: Donny Wilder
- Succeeded by: David Tribble

Personal details
- Born: Jeffrey Darren Duncan; January 7, 1966 (age 60) Greenville, South Carolina, U.S.
- Party: Republican
- Spouse: Melody Hodges (m. 1988; sep. 2023)
- Children: 3
- Education: Clemson University (BA)

Jeffrey Darren Duncan (born January 7, 1966) is an American politician and businessman who served as the United States representative for South Carolina's 3rd congressional district from 2011 to 2025. Duncan previously served in the South Carolina House of Representatives from 2002 to 2010.

== Early life, education, and business career ==
Jeff Duncan was born in Greenville, South Carolina, on January 7, 1966. His father worked in the textile business and moved the family across the South while Duncan was growing up. After attending three years of high school at Mooresville Senior High School in Mooresville, North Carolina, Duncan moved to Ware Shoals and attended Ware Shoals High School. During his senior year of high school, he met his future wife, Melody Hodges. Duncan graduated from Clemson University with a BA in political science in 1988 and was a member of the school's football team.

After graduation, Duncan served as branch manager and an assistant vice president during his seven years working in community banking. Later, he started his own small business, J. Duncan & Associates, a South Carolina-based, family-owned real estate marketing firm that specialized in statewide real estate auctions. He ran and operated that business until his election to Congress in 2010.

== South Carolina House of Representatives ==
=== Elections ===
Duncan ran for South Carolina's House District 15 in 2002. In the Republican primary, he defeated local businessman David Tribble Jr., 56%–44%. He won the general election with 61% of the vote. In 2004, he was reelected to a second term unopposed. In 2006, he was reelected to a third term with 63% of the vote. In 2008, he was reelected to a fourth term unopposed. In 2010, he retired in order to run for the U.S. House of Representatives. Tribble, Duncan's primary opponent in 2002, won Duncan's seat.

=== Tenure ===
Duncan has received the Guardian of Small Business award from the National Federation of Independent Business, an A+ rating from the South Carolina Club for Growth, and the Palmetto Leadership Award from the SC policy council, The SC Recreation and Parks Association and SC Wildlife Federation named him Legislator of the Year. Then Governor Mark Sanford also named him a "Taxpayer’s Hero".

=== Committee assignments ===
In 2007, Duncan was named chair of the House Agriculture, Natural Resources and Environmental Affairs Committee. He was appointed to serve on the Education Finance Study Committee and the Natural Gas Offshore Drilling Study Committee. He also served as South Carolina's representative on the Southern States Energy Board.

== U.S. House of Representatives ==
=== Elections ===
==== 2010 ====
Duncan ran for South Carolina's 3rd Congressional District when Republican incumbent U.S. representative J. Gresham Barrett ran for governor of South Carolina. He was an early Tea Party favorite and was endorsed by the Club for Growth and the National Right to Life Committee. In the Republican primary, businessman Richard Cash ranked first with 25% but failed to reach the 50% threshold to win outright. Duncan ranked second in the six-candidate field with 23%. In the runoff election, Duncan defeated Cash 51%–49%, a vote difference of 2,171. He won five of the district's ten counties, mostly in the southern part of the district. He won the general election with 62% of the vote, 2% less than John McCain's 64% vote in 2008. He won nine of the district's ten counties, losing just McCormick (52%–47%). Duncan spent $935,503; Democrat Jane Ballard Dyer spent $272,698.

==== 2012 ====
Duncan was reelected in the newly redrawn 3rd district, which excludes Aiken County, and includes two new counties: Newberry and Greenville. He received 67% of the vote. Duncan outperformed Romney by 2% in the district.

==== 2014 ====
Duncan was reelected with 71.18% of the vote over Democratic nominee Barbara Jo Mullis.

==== 2016 ====
Duncan was reelected, exceeding his 2014 election margin with 72.8% of the vote, over Democratic nominee Hosea Cleveland. He was the first Congressional Republican to carry McCormick County during a presidential election year. Duncan outperformed Trump by over 5% in 2016.

==== 2018 ====
Duncan was reelected with 67.79% of the vote against Democratic nominee Mary Geren and American Party nominee Dave Moore.

==== 2020 ====
Duncan was reelected with 71.21% of the vote against Democratic nominee Hosea Cleveland.

==== 2022 ====
Duncan was reelected in 2022 with 97.6% of the vote and no opponent on the ballot.

=== Tenure ===
As of January 30, 2018, Duncan has the most conservative GovTrack ideology score in the House of Representatives. In 2017, his Heritage Action voting scorecard was 100%.

=== Committee assignments ===
Duncan formerly served on the Committee on Natural Resources, the Committee on Homeland Security, and the Committee on Foreign Affairs. During over three years of his time on the Committee on Foreign Affairs, he chaired the Subcommittee on the Western Hemisphere. During two years of his time on the Committee on Homeland Security, he chaired the Subcommittee on Oversight and Management Efficiency.

On October 24, 2017, Duncan was appointed to the Energy and Commerce Committee.

=== Caucus memberships ===
- Congressional Solar Caucus
- Congressional Blockchain Caucus
- Freedom Caucus
- Rare Disease Caucus
- Congressional Caucus on Turkey and Turkish Americans

=== Legislation and tenure ===
Duncan was a "Tea Party freshman" in the 112th Congress.

In February 2011, Duncan introduced a resolution to create a new committee on the elimination of nonessential federal programs in an attempt to reduce federal outlays.

On January 18, 2012, Duncan introduced the Countering Iran in the Western Hemisphere Act of 2012 (H.R. 3783). This bill made it U.S. policy to use a comprehensive strategy to counter Iran's growing hostile presence in the Western Hemisphere by working together with U.S. allies and partners in the region to deter threats to U.S. interests by Iran, the Iranian Islamic Revolutionary Guard Corps (IRGC), the IRGC's Qods Force, and Hezbollah. On December 28, 2012, President Barack Obama signed the act into law.

On November 19, 2012, Duncan wrote Obama a letter discouraging him from nominating Susan Rice as secretary of state. His letter, which was signed by 97 members of Congress, stated that Rice "either willfully or incompetently misled the American public in the Benghazi matter" and that she had lost the American people's trust and would greatly undermine U.S. credibility abroad.

On April 18, 2013, Duncan introduced the Outer Continental Shelf Transboundary Hydrocarbon Agreements Authorization Act (H.R. 1613). This bill approves a year-old agreement between the U.S. and Mexico to allow the joint development of oil and gas straddling the two countries' maritime boundary in the Gulf of Mexico. H.R. 1613 passed the House with bipartisan support on June 27, 2013. It was subsequently wrapped into the Continuing Resolution of December 12, 2013.

On January 16, 2014, Duncan introduced the Energy Exploration and Production to Achieve National Demand Act (EXPAND Act) (H.R. 3895). The act frees Americans to produce more energy in the U.S. from all sources.

On March 13, 2014, Duncan introduced the DHS Acquisition Accountability and Efficiency Act (H.R. 4228; 113th Congress), a bill that directed the United States Department of Homeland Security to improve the accountability, transparency, and efficiency of its major acquisition programs. The bill specified procedures for DHS to follow if it failed to meet timelines, cost estimates, or other performance parameters for these programs. Duncan argued, "for years, DHS's purchases of major homeland security systems have been late, cost more, and done less than promised. This bill will save taxpayer dollars by forcing DHS to improve its management."

On February 23, 2016, Duncan introduced H.Res. 617, which gave the House the authority to file suit against the Obama administration should it violate or attempt to violate the law regarding the transfer of detainees from the detention facility at Guantanamo Bay.

In January 2017, Duncan introduced in the House the Hearing Protection Act of 2017 (HPA) (H.R. 367), which would reclassify gun suppressors (silencers) from Title II weapons to Title I weapons (currently ordinary shotguns, rifles and handguns, weapons "not regulated by the National Firearms Act, but regulated by the Gun Control Act of 1968 and other federal laws"), restricting their regulation and making them easier to buy. The HPA amends the Internal Revenue Code and Title 18 of the United States Code to eliminate the transfer tax and paperwork associated with registration of suppressors, refund the tax to anyone who paid it after October 22, 2015 (the date the first Hearing Protection Act was introduced, by Matt Salmon), and "preempt" existing state or local silencer taxes and regulations. In June 2017 Duncan added the HPA to the wide-ranging Sportsmen Heritage and Recreational Enhancement (SHARE) Act, of which he was also the lead sponsor.

On January 19, 2018, Duncan introduced the Ultrasound Informed Consent Act (H.R. 4844), which ensures that women seeking an abortion receive an ultrasound and the opportunity to review it before giving informed consent to receive an abortion.

== Political positions ==
Duncan has described himself as "a strong advocate for life and traditional family values".

In the House chamber, Duncan wore a mask reading "Let's Go Brandon", a popular coded message in Republican circles for an obscene insult to Joe Biden.

=== Abortion ===
Duncan is firmly opposed to abortion and exceptions for rape, incest, or saving the life of the mother. He has cosponsored legislation to ban late-term abortions, to end federal funding for abortion providers like Planned Parenthood, and to protect conscience rights for businesses and health care professionals who oppose paying for or participating in abortions.

=== Second Amendment ===
Duncan believes that all Americans have the right to own firearms. In addition to introducing the Hearing Protection Act, he has co-sponsored bills to expand concealed carry reciprocity rights. Duncan has been endorsed by the National Rifle Association Political Victory Fund (NRA-PVF), who gave him an "A" grade in 2014, rising to an "A+" by 2020.

=== LGBT rights ===
In 2015, Duncan cosponsored a Congressional resolution to amend the Constitution to ban same-sex marriage.

=== Taxes ===
Duncan voted for the Tax Cuts and Jobs Act of 2017. He has also cosponsored legislation to repeal the income tax, the estate tax, the health insurance tax, and the entirety of the tax code.

=== Health care ===
Duncan supported the full repeal of the Affordable Care Act (ACA), voting on numerous occasions to repeal it in full or in part. He supports replacing the ACA with free-market solutions, having cosponsored legislation to expand health savings accounts, make all health care spending tax-deductible, supporting Christian charity health plans, and creating association health plans.

=== Immigration ===
Duncan opposes amnesty for illegal immigrants. He believes border security is a constitutional responsibility of the federal government. Duncan supports the construction of a border wall with physical fencing, surveillance technology, and increased border patrol agents on the ground. In February 2017, he introduced the Terrorist Deportation Act (H.R. 844), which makes it harder for suspected terrorists to come to the U.S. and easier to remove those already here. Duncan is also a co-sponsor of "Goodlatte/McCaul", H.R. 4760, which requires mandatory E-verify, makes it a crime to overstay a visa, eliminates chain migration, ends the diversity lottery, and creates an agricultural worker visa program.

Duncan voted against the Fairness for High-Skilled Immigrants Act of 2019 which would amend the Immigration and Nationality Act to eliminate the per-country numerical limitation for employment-based immigrants, to increase the per-country numerical limitation for family-sponsored immigrants, and for other purposes.

Duncan voted against the Further Consolidated Appropriations Act of 2020 which authorizes DHS to nearly double the available H-2B visas for the remainder of FY 2020.

Duncan voted against the Consolidated Appropriations Act (H.R. 1158), which effectively prohibits Immigration and Customs Enforcement from cooperating with the Department of Health and Human Services to detain or remove illegal alien sponsors of Unaccompanied Alien Children.

=== Energy ===
Duncan supports increased use of fossil fuels. He sponsored the legislation to implement the Transboundary Hydrocarbon Agreement with Mexico, and cosponsored legislation supporting offshore energy exploration, seismic testing, clean coal technology, nuclear power production, and the export of natural gas. Duncan has also worked to ease regulations on hydraulic fracturing, coal ash, the social cost of carbon, and the "Waters of the United States" regulation. He supported the Department of Interior and Bureau of Ocean Energy Management's January 2018 decision to allow more access to the Outer Continental Shelf.

In December 2023, Duncan introduced the Atomic Energy Advancement Act, provisions of which were passed as part of the ADVANCE Act within the Fire Grants and Safety Act, which was signed into law by President Joe Biden in July 2024.

=== Foreign policy ===
In 2019, Duncan signed a letter led by Representative Ro Khanna and Senator Rand Paul to President Trump. The letter asserted that it is "long past time to rein in the use of force that goes beyond congressional authorization" and that they hoped this would "serve as a model for ending hostilities in the future—in particular, as you and your administration seek a political solution to our involvement in Afghanistan."

In 2019, Duncan was one of 60 representatives to vote against condemning Trump's withdrawal from Syria.

In 2020, Duncan voted against the National Defense Authorization Act of 2021, which would prevent the president from withdrawing soldiers from Afghanistan without congressional approval.

In July 2021, Duncan voted against the bipartisan ALLIES Act, which would increase by 8,000 the number of special immigrant visas for Afghan allies of the U.S. military during its invasion of Afghanistan, while also reducing some application requirements that caused long application backlogs; the bill passed in the House 407–16.

Duncan voted to provide Israel with support following 2023 Hamas attack on Israel.

=== Support for impeaching President Joe Biden and Alejandro Mayorkas ===
During the 117th United States Congress, Duncan was co-sponsor of three resolutions to impeach President Joe Biden and one resolution to impeach Secretary of Homeland Security Alejandro Mayorkas.

=== MLB ===
Duncan was the lead sponsor of a bill to remove Major League Baseball's antitrust law exemption after the league pulled its 2021 All-Star Game from Atlanta in protest of Georgia's new voting law.

=== Committee assignments ===
- Committee on Energy and Commerce
  - Subcommittee on Digital Commerce and Consumer Protection
  - Subcommittee on Energy
  - Subcommittee on Environment
- Republican Study Committee
- Sovereignty Caucus – Co-chair

During Duncan's time in Congress, he has also served on the House Committee on Homeland Security, House Committee on Natural Resources, and House Committee on Foreign Affairs. From 2015 to 2017, he chaired the Subcommittee on the Western Hemisphere on the House Committee on Foreign Affairs. From 2012 to 2014, Duncan chaired the Subcommittee on Oversight and Management Efficiency on the Committee on Homeland Security.

== Electoral history ==
=== South Carolina House of Representatives (2002–2008) ===
2002 South Carolina House of Representatives 15th district Republican primary
Party	Candidate	Votes	%
Republican	Jeff Duncan	1,383	56.43%
Republican	David Tribble Jr.	1,068	43.57%
Total votes		2,451	100.00%

2002 South Carolina House of Representatives 15th district election
Party	Candidate	Votes	%
Republican	Jeff Duncan	5,034	61.05%
Democratic	Diane Byrd Anderson	3,205	38.87%
Write-in		7	0.00%
Total votes		8,246	100.00%
Republican gain from Democratic			

2004 South Carolina House of Representatives 15th district election
Party	Candidate	Votes	%
Republican	Jeff Duncan (incumbent)	7,146	95.39%
Write-in		345	4.61%
Total votes		7,491	100.00%
Republican hold			

2006 South Carolina House of Representatives 15th district Republican primary
Party	Candidate	Votes	%
Republican	Jeff Duncan (incumbent)	1,939	68.98%
Republican	Rob Clapper	872	31.02%
Total votes		2,811	100.00%

2006 South Carolina House of Representatives 15th district election
Party	Candidate	Votes	%
Republican	Jeff Duncan (incumbent)	4,404	62.75%
Democratic	Gary Vincent	2,605	37.12%
Write-in		9	0.13%
Total votes		7,018	100.00%
Republican hold			

2008 South Carolina House of Representatives 15th district election
Party	Candidate	Votes	%
Republican	Jeff Duncan (incumbent)	8,128	99.06%
Write-in		76	0.93%
Total votes		8,204	100.00%
Republican hold			

=== United States House of Representatives (2010–2022) ===
2010 South Carolina's 3rd congressional district Republican primary
Party	Candidate	Votes	%
Republican	Richard Cash	20,923	25.35%
Republican	Jeff Duncan	19,051	23.08%
Republican	Rex Rice	16,071	19.47%
Republican	Joe Grimaud	15,503	18.78%
Republican	Neal Collins	6,787	8.22%
Republican	Frank Michael Vasovski	4,216	5.11%
Total votes		82,551	100.00

2010 South Carolina's 3rd congressional district Republican primary runoff
Party	Candidate	Votes	%
Republican	Jeff Duncan	37,300	51.50%
Republican	Richard Cash	35,129	48.50%
Total votes		72,429	100.00

2010 South Carolina's 3rd congressional district election
Party	Candidate	Votes	%
Republican	Jeff Duncan	126,235	62.46
Democratic	Jane Ballard Dyer	73,095	36.16
Constitution	John Dalen	2,682	1.33
Write-in		96	0.05%
Total votes		202,108	100.00
Republican hold			

2012 South Carolina's 3rd congressional district election
Party	Candidate	Votes	%
Republican	Jeff Duncan (incumbent)	169,512	66.54%
Democratic	Brian Ryan B. Doyle	85,735	33.26%
Write-in		516	0.20%
Total votes		254,763	100.00
Republican hold			

2014 South Carolina's 3rd congressional district election
Party	Candidate	Votes	%
Republican	Jeff Duncan (incumbent)	116,741	71.18%
Democratic	Barbara Jo Mullis	47,181	28.77%
Write-in		87	0.05%
Total votes		164,009	100.00
Republican hold			

2016 South Carolina's 3rd congressional district election
Party	Candidate	Votes	%
Republican	Jeff Duncan (incumbent)	198,431	72.82%
Democratic	Hosea Cleveland	73,766	27.07%
Write-in		284	0.10%
Total votes		272,481	100.00
Republican hold			

2018 South Carolina's 3rd congressional district election
Party	Candidate	Votes	%
Republican	Jeff Duncan (incumbent)	153,338	67.79%
Democratic	Mary Geren	70,046	30.97%
American	Dave Moore	2,697	1.19%
Write-in		123	0.05%
Total votes		226,204	100.00
Republican hold			

2020 South Carolina's 3rd congressional district election
Party	Candidate	Votes	%
Republican	Jeff Duncan (incumbent)	237,544	71.21%
Democratic	Hosea Cleveland	95,712	28.69%
Write-in		308	0.09%
Total votes		333,564	100.00
Republican hold			

2022 South Carolina's 3rd congressional district election
Party	Candidate	Votes	%
Republican	Jeff Duncan (incumbent)	189,971	97.64%
Write-in		4,598	2.36%
Total votes		194,569	100.00
Republican hold			

== Personal life ==
Duncan married his wife Melody Hodges in 1988; they have three children, who by 2023 had all become adults. In September 2023, Melody filed to divorce Duncan, alleging Duncan has had multiple extramarital affairs, including one with a lobbyist that Melody believes Duncan is living together with in Washington D.C.; Melody alleged that Duncan "admitted this adulterous relationship to many other people, including the parties' sons and members of his staff".

== Awards ==
Duncan has received numerous awards during his time in Congress, including:

- Club for Growth's Defender of Economic Freedom Award
- FreedomWorks Freedom Fighter Award
- Family Research Council True Blue Award
- Act for America National Security Patriot Award
- NFIB Guardian of Small Business
- Heritage Action Sentinel
- 60 Plus Association Guardian of Seniors Rights

== Congressional baseball shooting ==
According to Duncan, the shooter, James Thomas Hodgkinson, approached him at his car and asked if Democrats or Republicans were on the field.

U.S. House of Representatives
Preceded by Gresham Barrett	Member of the U.S. House of Representatives from South Carolina's 3rd congressional district 2011–2025	Succeeded by Sheri Biggs
U.S. order of precedence (ceremonial)
Preceded by Albert Wynn as Former U.S. Representative	Order of precedence of the United States as Former U.S. Representative	Succeeded by Charles Bass as Former U.S. Representative
