= Outer Continental Shelf Transboundary Hydrocarbon Agreements Authorization Act =

- Long title: To amend the Outer Continental Shelf Lands Act to provide for the proper Federal management and oversight of transboundary hydrocarbon reservoirs, and for other purposes.
- Announced in: the 113th United States Congress
- Sponsored by: Rep. Jeff Duncan (R, SC-3)
- Number of co-sponsors: 2

Codification
- Acts affected: Outer Continental Shelf Lands Act, Securities Exchange Act of 1934
- U.S.C. sections affected: 43 U.S.C. § 1331 et seq., 15 U.S.C. § 78m(q)
- Agencies affected: United States Congress, Executive Office of the President, United States Department of the Interior, United States Department of Veterans Affairs,

[H.R. 1613 Legislative history]
- Introduced in the House as H.R. 1613 by Rep. Jeff Duncan (R-SC) on April 18, 2013; Committee consideration by United States House Committee on Natural Resources, United States House Natural Resources Subcommittee on Energy and Mineral Resources, United States House Committee on Foreign Affairs, United States House Foreign Affairs Subcommittee on the Western Hemisphere, United States House Foreign Affairs Subcommittee on Terrorism, Nonproliferation, and Trade, United States House Committee on Financial Services; Passed the House on June 27, 2013 (Roll Call 293: 256-171)

The Outer Continental Shelf Transboundary Hydrocarbon Agreements Authorization Act (H.R. 1613) is a bill that would approve a February 20, 2012 agreement between the United States of America and Mexico about the development of oil and gas natural resources in the Outer Continental Shelf in the Gulf of Mexico near where the two countries share a border. The bill also establishes some of the rules and procedures for enacting this treaty. It was introduced into the United States House of Representatives during the 113th United States Congress.

== Provisions/Elements of the bill ==
This summary is based largely on the summary provided by the Congressional Research Service, a public domain source.

The Outer Continental Shelf Transboundary Hydrocarbon Agreements Authorization Act would amend the Outer Continental Shelf Lands Act (OCSLA) to authorize the United States Secretary of the Interior to implement any agreement for the management of transboundary hydrocarbon reservoirs entered into by the President and approved by the United States Congress. The Act then prescribes procedures for submission of such agreements to Congress.

H.R. 1613 would also authorize the Secretary of the Interior to implement the terms of the Agreement between the United States of America and Mexico Concerning Transboundary Hydrocarbon Reservoirs in the Gulf of Mexico, signed at Los Cabos, February 20, 2012 (the Agreement), including: (1) approving unitization agreements and related arrangements for the exploration, development, or production of oil and natural gas from transboundary reservoirs or geological structures; (2) making available, subject to the agreement's confidentiality protections, information pertaining to such activities that may be considered confidential, privileged, or proprietary; and (3) ensuring that only the operator, lessee, or inspection staff at the Bureau of Safety and Environmental Enforcement have authority to stop work on such activities on any production site attached to the U.S. seabed.

The bill would exempt any actions taken by a public company in accordance with a transboundary hydrocarbon agreement from resources extraction reporting requirements under the Securities Exchange Act of 1934.

Finally, the bill would prohibit the passage and enactment of the Outer Continental Shelf Transboundary Hydrocarbon Agreements Authorization Act from being construed as: (1) authorizing the Secretary of the Interior to participate in any negotiations, conferences, or consultations with Cuba regarding exploration, development, or production of hydrocarbon resources in the Gulf of Mexico along the U.S. maritime border with Cuba (including the area known the `Eastern Gap'); or (2) affecting U.S. sovereign rights and jurisdiction over the Outer Continental Shelf which appertains to it.

== Congressional Budget Office report ==
This summary is based largely on the summary provided by the Congressional Budget Office (as ordered reported by the House Committee on Natural Resources on May 15, 2013), a public domain source.

H.R. 1613 would approve a February 20, 2012, agreement between the United States and Mexico regarding the development of oil and gas resources in what is known as the "transboundary" area in the Gulf of Mexico. It would establish guidelines and procedures for implementing that agreement and for Congressional review of any future agreements governing that area.

Pay-as-you-go procedures apply to this bill because enacting the legislation would affect offsetting receipts, which are recorded as a credit against direct spending. The Congressional Budget Office estimates that enacting H.R. 1613 would increase offsetting receipts from lease sales in the Outer Continental Shelf (OCS) by $25 million over the 2014–2023 period, thus reducing direct spending by a corresponding amount. Enacting H.R. 1613 would not affect revenues.

H.R. 1613 contains no intergovernmental or private-sector mandates as defined in the Unfunded Mandates Reform Act (UMRA) and would impose no costs on state, local, or tribal governments.

== Procedural history ==
The Outer Continental Shelf Transboundary Hydrocarbon Agreements Authorization Act was introduced into the House on April 18, 2013 by Rep. Jeff Duncan (R-SC). It was referred to several committees, including the United States House Committee on Natural Resources, the United States House Natural Resources Subcommittee on Energy and Mineral Resources, the United States House Committee on Foreign Affairs, the United States House Foreign Affairs Subcommittee on the Western Hemisphere, the United States House Foreign Affairs Subcommittee on Terrorism, Nonproliferation, and Trade, and the United States House Committee on Financial Services for debate, discussion, and amendment. On June 21, 2013, House Majority Leader Eric Cantor announced that H.R. 1864 would be on the floor calendar for the week of June 24. On June 27, 2013, the House voted in Roll Call 293: 256-171 to pass H.R. 1613.

== See also ==
- List of bills in the 113th United States Congress
- hydrocarbon reservoirs
- Outer Continental Shelf
- United States energy law
