= AFFA =

AFFA may refer to:

- Alliance for Full Acceptance, an LGBTQIA+ Advocacy Organization in South Carolina
- Angels Forever, Forever Angels, a slogan of the Hells Angels Motorcycle Club
- Association of Football Federations of Azerbaijan, the governing body of association football in Azerbaijan
- Formerly the department of Agriculture, Fisheries, and Forestry - Australia, now Department of Agriculture (Australia, 2019–20)
