= 2008 United States House of Representatives elections in South Carolina =

- November 4, 2008

All 6 South Carolina seats to the United States House of Representatives
	Majority party	Minority party
Party	Republican	Democratic
Last election	4	2
Seats won	4	2
Seat change	Steady	Steady
Popular vote	939,703	919,529
Percentage	50.15%	49.07%
Swing	▼5.05%	▲5.55%

Republican
50–60%
60–70%
70–80%
Democratic
50–60%
60–70%
70–80%
80–90%
Winners
Republican Hold
Democratic Hold

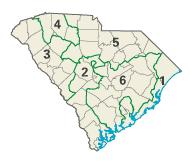
South Carolina's 6 congressional districts

The 2008 United States House of Representatives elections in South Carolina were held on Tuesday, November 4, 2008. The primary elections were held on June 10 and the runoff elections were held two weeks later on June 24. The composition of the state delegation before the election was four Republicans and two Democrats.

All seats were considered safe for their incumbent parties except for districts 1 and 2. This was the last time that Democrats won more than one congressional district from South Carolina until 2018.

== Overview ==
United States House of Representatives elections in South Carolina, 2008
Party	Votes	Percentage	Seats	+/–
Republican	939,703	50.15%	4	—
Democratic	919,529	49.07%	2	—
Green	7,332	0.39%	0	—
Others	7,326	0.39%	0	—
Totals	1,873,890	100.00%	6	—

== District 1 ==
2008 South Carolina's 1st congressional district election
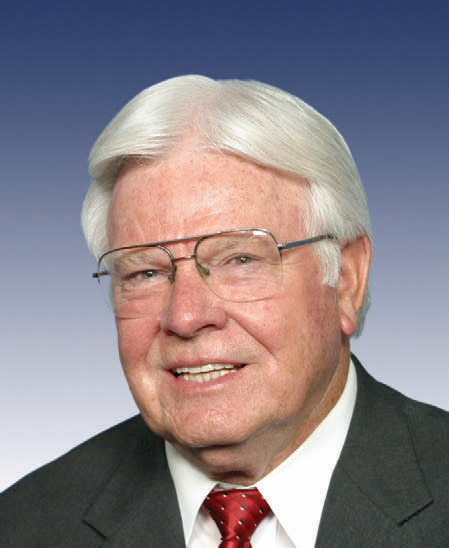

Nominee	Henry E. Brown, Jr.	Linda Ketner
Party	Republican	Democratic
Popular vote	177,540	163,724
Percentage	51.9%	47.9%
- County results Brown: 50–60% Ketner: 50–60%
U.S. Representative before election
Henry E. Brown, Jr.
Republican
Elected U.S. Representative
Henry E. Brown, Jr.
Republican

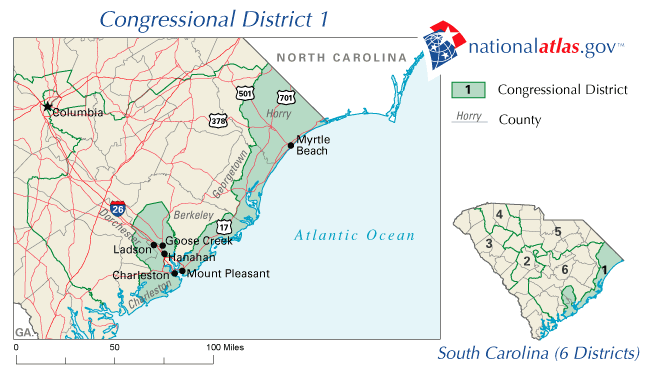

Incumbent Republican Congressman Henry E. Brown, Jr. defeated Democratic candidate Linda Ketner by a surprisingly thin margin to win a fifth term in Congress. Ketner's performance was the strongest performance by a Democrat that Brown had seen in his career and was made all the more surprising by the fact that she was openly lesbian and the 1st district, stretching across the coast of South Carolina, was strongly conservative.

=== Predictions ===
Source	Ranking	As of
The Cook Political Report	Lean R	November 6, 2008
Rothenberg	Lean R	November 2, 2008
Sabato's Crystal Ball	Lean R	November 6, 2008
Real Clear Politics	Safe R	November 7, 2008
CQ Politics	Lean R	November 6, 2008

South Carolina's 1st congressional district election, 2008
Party	Candidate	Votes	%
Republican	Henry E. Brown, Jr. (incumbent)	177,540	51.93
Democratic	Linda Ketner	163,724	47.89
Write-ins		615	0.18
Total votes		341,879	100.00
Republican hold			

== District 2 ==
2008 South Carolina's 2nd congressional district election
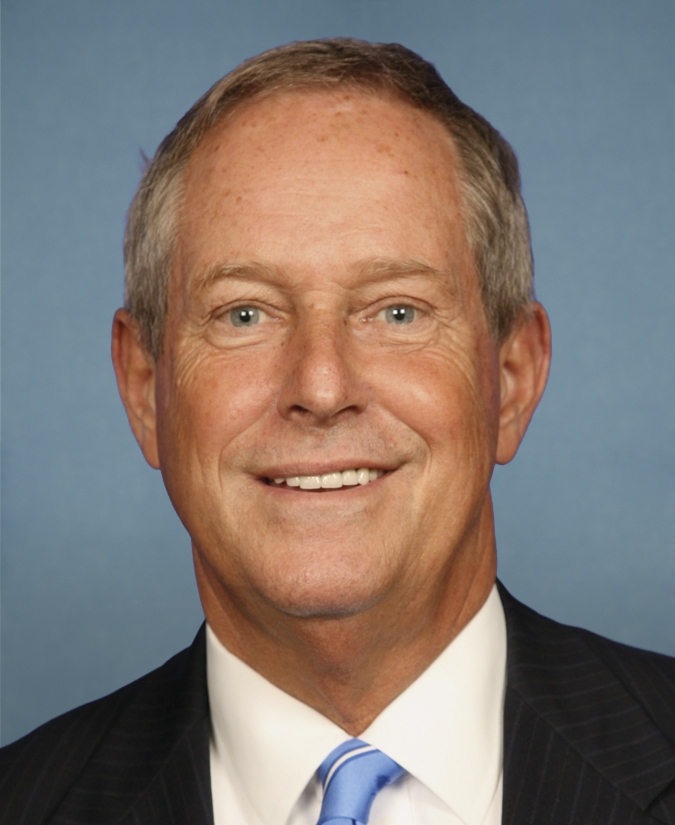

Nominee	Joe Wilson	Rob Miller
Party	Republican	Democratic
Popular vote	184,583	158,627
Percentage	53.7%	46.2%
- County results Miller: 50–60% 60–70% 70–80% Wilson: 50–60% 60–70%
U.S. Representative before election
Joe Wilson
Republican
Elected U.S. Representative
Joe Wilson
Republican

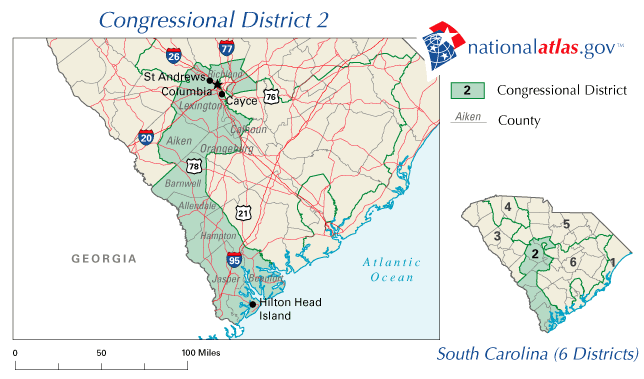

Incumbent Republican Congressman Joe Wilson defeated Democrat and Iraq War Veteran Rob Miller by the thinnest margin of his electoral career. Miller's performance in this conservative district rooted in eastern and southern South Carolina was surprising, though ultimately was not strong enough to unseat Wilson in his bid for a fifth term.

=== Predictions ===
Source	Ranking	As of
The Cook Political Report	Likely R	November 6, 2008
Rothenberg	Safe R	November 2, 2008
Sabato's Crystal Ball	Safe R	November 6, 2008
Real Clear Politics	Safe R	November 7, 2008
CQ Politics	Likely R	November 6, 2008

South Carolina's 2nd congressional district election, 2008
Party	Candidate	Votes	%
Republican	Joe Wilson (incumbent)	184,583	53.74
Democratic	Rob Miller	158,627	46.18
Write-ins		276	0.08
Total votes		343,486	100.00
Republican hold			

== District 3 ==
2008 South Carolina's 3rd congressional district election
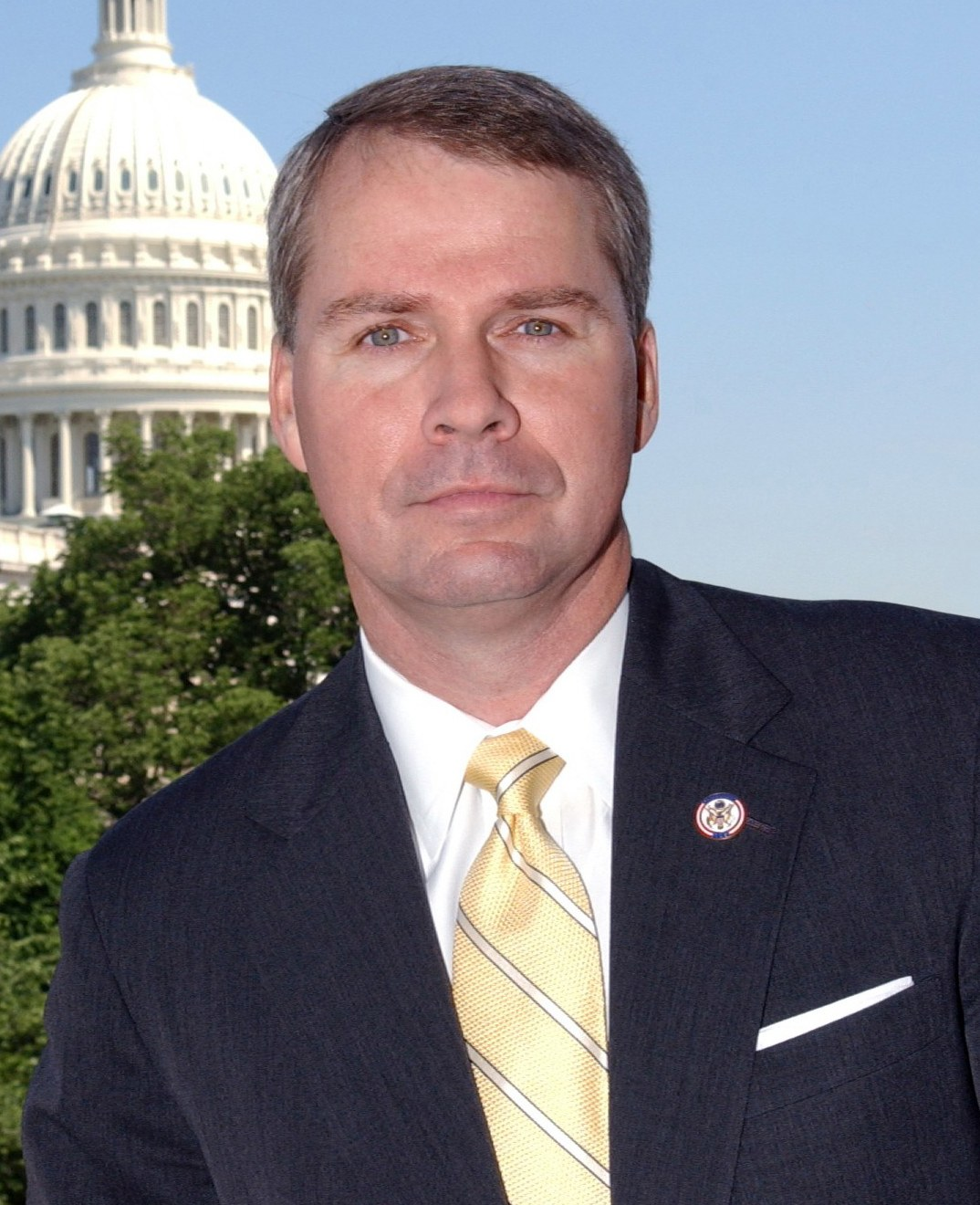

Nominee	J. Gresham Barrett	Jane Ballard Dyer
Party	Republican	Democratic
Popular vote	186,799	101,724
Percentage	64.7%	35.2%
- County results Barrett: 50–60% 60–70% 70–80% Dyer: 50–60%
U.S. Representative before election
J. Gresham Barrett
Republican
Elected U.S. Representative
J. Gresham Barrett
Republican

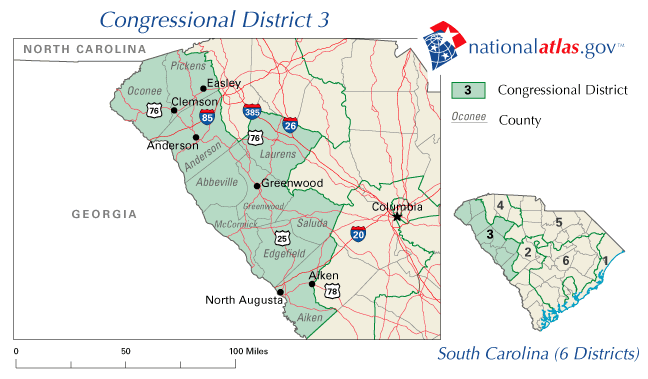

Though two of his fellow Republican Congressman faced tougher-than-expected bids for re-election, incumbent Republican Congressman J. Gresham Barrett easily dispatched Democratic nominee Jane Ballard Dyer, a pilot, in this staunchly conservative district based in western South Carolina.

=== Predictions ===
Source	Ranking	As of
The Cook Political Report	Safe R	November 6, 2008
Rothenberg	Safe R	November 2, 2008
Sabato's Crystal Ball	Safe R	November 6, 2008
Real Clear Politics	Safe R	November 7, 2008
CQ Politics	Safe R	November 6, 2008

South Carolina's 3rd congressional district election, 2008
Party	Candidate	Votes	%
Republican	J. Gresham Barrett (incumbent)	186,799	64.69
Democratic	Jane Ballard Dyer	101,724	35.23
Write-ins		218	0.08
Total votes		288,741	100.00
Republican hold			

== District 4 ==
2008 South Carolina's 4th congressional district election
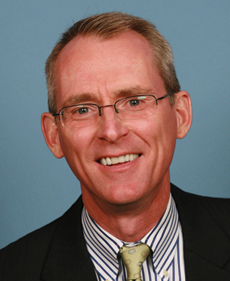

Nominee	Bob Inglis	Paul Corden
Party	Republican	Democratic
Popular vote	184,440	113,291
Percentage	60.1%	36.9%
- County results Inglis: 50–60% 60–70% Corden: 50–60%
U.S. Representative before election
Bob Inglis
Republican
Elected U.S. Representative
Bob Inglis
Republican

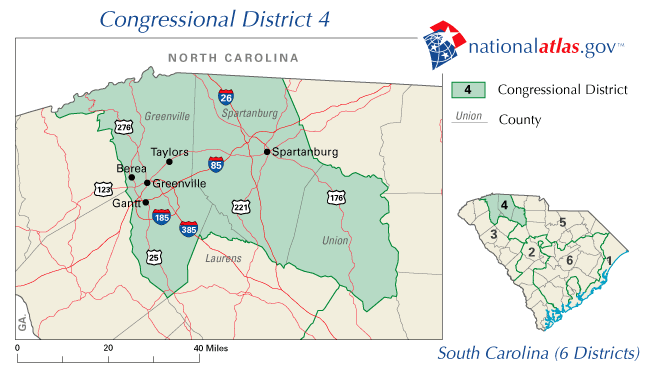

Incumbent Republican Congressman defeated Democratic candidate Paul Corden and Green Party candidate C. Faye Walters in the conservative district rooted in Upstate South Carolina.

=== Predictions ===
Source	Ranking	As of
The Cook Political Report	Safe R	November 6, 2008
Rothenberg	Safe R	November 2, 2008
Sabato's Crystal Ball	Safe R	November 6, 2008
Real Clear Politics	Safe R	November 7, 2008
CQ Politics	Safe R	November 6, 2008

South Carolina's 4th congressional district election, 2008
Party	Candidate	Votes	%
Republican	Bob Inglis (incumbent)	184,440	60.09
Democratic	Paul Corden	113,291	36.91
Green	C. Faye Walters	7,332	2.39
Write-ins		1,865	0.61
Total votes		306,928	100.00
Republican hold			

== District 5 ==
2008 South Carolina's 5th congressional district election
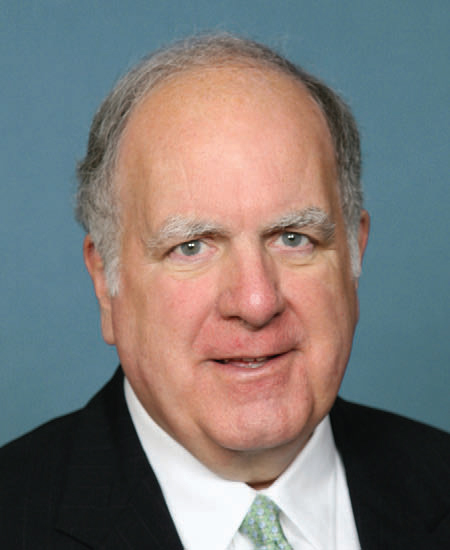

Nominee	John Spratt	Albert Spencer
Party	Democratic	Republican
Popular vote	188,785	113,282
Percentage	61.6%	37.0%
- County results Spratt: 50–60% 60–70% 70–80% 80–90%
U.S. Representative before election
John Spratt
Democratic
Elected U.S. Representative
John Spratt
Democratic

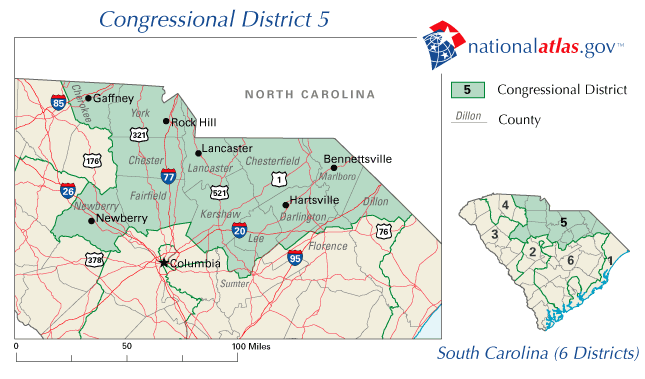

Long-serving incumbent Democratic Congressman John Spratt has been able to maintain popularity in this conservative district based in northern South Carolina, enabling to repeatedly win re-election despite the national mood. This year proved no different, with Spratt easily winning a fourteenth term over Republican challenger Albert Spencer and Constitution Party candidate Frank Waggoner.

=== Predictions ===
Source	Ranking	As of
The Cook Political Report	Safe D	November 6, 2008
Rothenberg	Safe D	November 2, 2008
Sabato's Crystal Ball	Safe D	November 6, 2008
Real Clear Politics	Safe D	November 7, 2008
CQ Politics	Safe D	November 6, 2008

South Carolina's 5th congressional district election, 2008
Party	Candidate	Votes	%
Democratic	John Spratt (incumbent)	188,785	61.64
Republican	Albert Spencer	113,282	36.99
Constitution	Frank Waggoner	4,093	1.42
Write-ins		125	0.04
Total votes		306,285	100.00
Democratic hold			

== District 6 ==
2008 South Carolina's 6th congressional district election
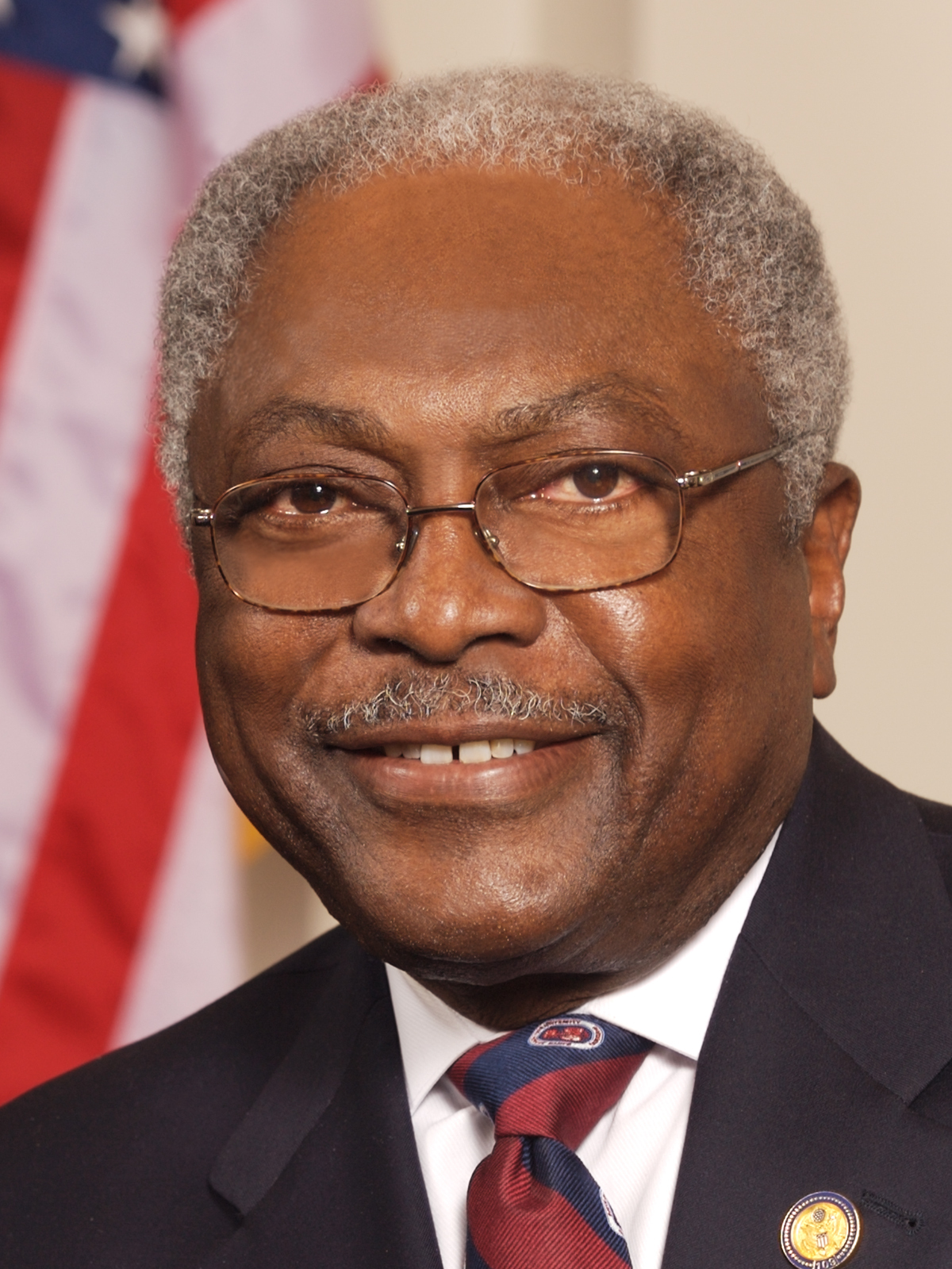

Nominee	Jim Clyburn	Nancy Harrelson
Party	Democratic	Republican
Popular vote	193,378	93,059
Percentage	67.5%	32.5%
- County results Clyburn: 50–60% 60–70% 70–80% 80–90%
U.S. Representative before election
Jim Clyburn
Democratic
Elected U.S. Representative
Jim Clyburn
Democratic

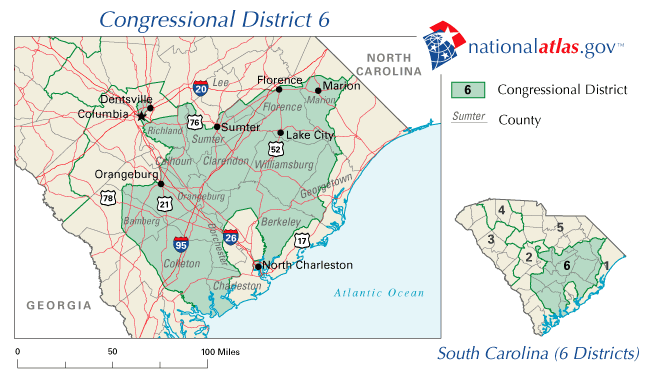

Incumbent Democratic Congressman Jim Clyburn, the House Majority Whip, easily won a ninth term in this very liberal, African-American majority district in central South Carolina. Clyburn won re-election over Republican Nancy Harrelson by the largest margin out of anyone in the South Carolina congressional delegation.

=== Predictions ===
Source	Ranking	As of
The Cook Political Report	Safe D	November 6, 2008
Rothenberg	Safe D	November 2, 2008
Sabato's Crystal Ball	Safe D	November 6, 2008
Real Clear Politics	Safe D	November 7, 2008
CQ Politics	Safe D	November 6, 2008

South Carolina's 6th congressional district election, 2008
Party	Candidate	Votes	%
Democratic	Jim Clyburn (incumbent)	193,378	67.48
Republican	Nancy Harrelson	93,059	32.47
Write-ins		134	0.05
Total votes		286,571	100.00
Democratic hold			

== See also ==
- United States House elections, 2008
- United States Senate election in South Carolina, 2008
