= Francis X. Archibald =

American politician (1931–2021)

Francis (Archie) Archibald

Member of the South Carolina House of Representatives from the 99th district
- In office 1981–1986
- Preceded by: William Clifton Stanley
- Succeeded by: Henry E. Brown Jr.

Personal details
- Born: Francis Xavier Archibald; October 2, 1931 Lexington, Massachusetts, U.S.
- Died: June 2021 (aged 89) Mount Pleasant, South Carolina, U.S.
- Party: Democratic
- Spouse(s): Twice widowed (1st: 56 years, Mary Frances Cooper, died Dec. 2010; 2nd: 28 months, Joyce Lindstrom Wahlberg, died August 2015)
- Children: 5
- Education: Charleston Southern University; Webster University

Francis Xavier Archibald (October 2, 1931 – June 24, 2021) was an American politician in the state of South Carolina. He served in the South Carolina House of Representatives as a member of the Democratic Party from 1981 to 1986, representing Berkeley County, South Carolina. He was a security consultant and columnist.
