= Gresham Barrett =

American politician (born 1961)

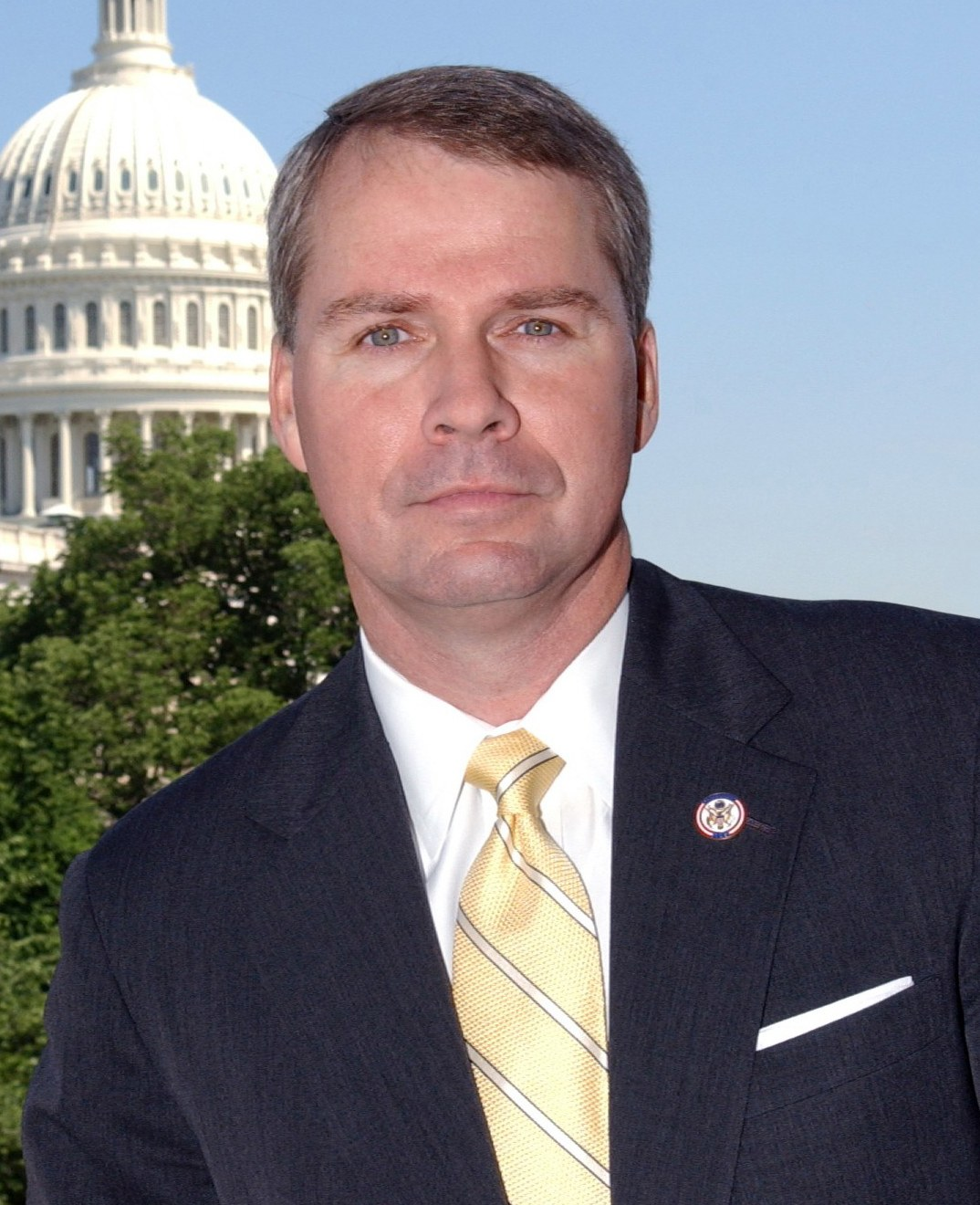

Member of the U.S. House of Representatives from South Carolina's 3rd district
- In office January 3, 2003 – January 3, 2011
- Preceded by: Lindsey Graham
- Succeeded by: Jeff Duncan

Member of the South Carolina House of Representatives from the 1st district
- In office January 13, 1997 – January 3, 2003
- Preceded by: Bradley Cain
- Succeeded by: Bill Whitmire

Personal details
- Born: James Gresham Barrett; February 14, 1961 (age 65) Westminster, South Carolina, U.S.
- Party: Republican
- Spouse: Natalie Finley
- Children: 3
- Education: The Citadel (BS)

Military service
- Branch/service: United States Army
- Years of service: 1983–1987
- Rank: Captain
- Unit: 1st Cavalry Division

James Gresham Barrett (born February 14, 1961) is an American politician who served as the U.S. representative for South Carolina's 3rd congressional district from 2003 to 2011. A member of the Republican Party, he was a candidate for its nomination for Governor of South Carolina in the 2010 election. A resident of Westminster, South Carolina, the district he represented runs along the Savannah River in the northwestern part of the state.

== Early life, education, and business career ==
Barrett was born in Westminster in Oconee County. Barrett attended The Citadel, The Military College of South Carolina and graduated in 1983. He served in the United States Army from 1983 to 1987, attaining the rank of captain in the field artillery. Barrett managed the family's furniture store.

== South Carolina legislature ==
He was elected to the South Carolina House of Representatives and served from 1996 to 2002, and was assigned to the Education and Public Works Committee, Labor Commerce and Industry Committee, Rules Committee, and the School Choice Ad Hoc Committee. He was also the Chairman of the Ad Hoc Committee on Urban Growth. During the 2000 Presidential Election Barrett was a member of the George W. Bush for President South Carolina State Steering Committee.

== U.S. House of Representatives ==
=== Elections ===
Barrett won a congressional seat in 2002 to replace Lindsey Graham, who retired to run for the U.S. Senate, and took office in January 2003. He ran unopposed for reelection in 2004. In 2006, Barrett won reelection by defeating Democratic challenger Lee Ballenger with 63 percent of the vote. Barrett outspent his opponent $857,922 to $27,891. In 2008, he defeated Democrat Jane Ballard Dyer, carrying 65 percent of the vote.

=== Tenure ===
Barrett missed 571 votes as of March 31, 2010, more than any other member of the 111th House and totaling 43% of the votes since the beginning of this term.

According to the National Journal Barrett was among the most conservative members of the U.S. House of Representatives. He was endorsed by the NRA Political Victory Fund, National Right to Life Committee, and the National Federation of Independent Business.

In July 2006, Barrett was one of 33 members of the House of Representatives to vote against renewal of the Voting Rights Act. In 2007, he voted against the Democratic version of SCHIP. Barrett supports offshore drilling to make the United States energy independent. On April 15, 2008 Barrett became the 71st Co-Sponsor of the FairTax (H.R. 25). Following a 2009 Congressional pay raise that many felt unmerited, Congressman Barrett protested by giving his pay raise to Anderson Interfaith Ministries.

Barrett is a staunch advocate of a federal prohibition of online poker. In 2006, he cosponsored H.R. 4411, the Goodlatte-Leach Internet Gambling Prohibition Act and H.R. 4777, the Internet Gambling Prohibition Act. In 2008, he opposed H.R. 5767, the Payment Systems Protection Act (a bill that sought to place a moratorium on enforcement of the Unlawful Internet Gambling Enforcement Act while the U.S. Treasury Department and the Federal Reserve defined "unlawful Internet gambling").

In 2003, Barrett introduced the Stop Terrorist Entry Program Act (STEP). The STEP Act updates and amends the Immigration and Nationality Act to bar the admission of individuals from countries listed by the Department of State as State Sponsors of Terrorism. The STEP Act, as introduced in 2003, would not only bar citizens from the list from ever entering the United States, but would also deport non-immigrant visa holders legally residing in the United States that are citizens of countries on the list. Though Barrett said that the updated STEP Act was in response to the 2009 Fort Hood shooting and the failed bombing attempt on Northwest Airlines Flight 253, Keith Olbermann said neither of the alleged perpetrators would have fallen under its restrictions. Alleged Flight 253 bomber Umar Farouk Abdulmutallab is a citizen of Nigeria, which is not listed as a state sponsor of terrorism, and Fort Hood shooter Nidal Hasan was born in Arlington, Virginia.

=== Committee assignments ===
- Committee on Financial Services
  - Subcommittee on Capital Markets, Insurance, and Government-Sponsored Enterprises
  - Subcommittee on Financial Institutions and Consumer Credit
- Committee on Foreign Affairs
  - Subcommittee on Europe
  - Subcommittee on Terrorism, Nonproliferation, and Trade
  - Subcommittee on the Middle East and South Asia
- Committee on Standards of Official Conduct

== 2010 gubernatorial election ==
In March 2009, Barrett announced his candidacy for Governor of South Carolina in the 2010 South Carolina gubernatorial election. Candidates for the Republican nomination included; State Attorney General Henry McMaster, State Lt. Governor Andre Bauer, Congressman Barrett, and State Representative Nikki Haley. Nikki Haley led the first nomination ballot with 49% of the vote falling just short of the 50% threshold needed to win the nomination outright on June 8, 2010. Haley won the run-off election on June 22, 2010 with 65% to Barrett's 35%.

== Personal life ==
Barrett is married to Natalie Barrett (née Finley) and has three children. He has served as a member of several boards, including as President of the Westminster Rotary Club, Chairman of the Oconee District Boy Scouts, President of the Westminster Chamber of Commerce, board member of the Oconee County Red Cross, member of the Oconee Kids Do Count Board, and coach of the Barrett's Furniture PONY League Baseball team. Barrett is also a member of the ReFormers Caucus of Issue One.

Barrett was named one of The Hill's Most Beautiful People on Capitol Hill for 2008, placing ninth and becoming the only congressperson or elected official in the top 10.

U.S. House of Representatives
Preceded by Lindsey Graham	Member of the U.S. House of Representatives from South Carolina's 3rd congressional district 2003–2011	Succeeded by Jeff Duncan
U.S. order of precedence (ceremonial)
Preceded by Donna Edwards as Former U.S. Representative	Order of precedence of the United States as Former U.S. Representative	Succeeded by Trey Gowdy as Former U.S. Representative
