= DHS Acquisition Accountability and Efficiency Act =

- Long title: To require the Department of Homeland Security to improve discipline, accountability, and transparency in acquisition program management.
- Announced in: the 113th United States Congress
- Sponsored by: Rep. Jeff Duncan (R, SC-3)
- Number of co-sponsors: 3

Codification
- U.S.C. sections affected: 6 U.S.C. § 101 et seq., 6 U.S.C. § 391 et seq., 41 U.S.C. § 1702, 6 U.S.C. § 341 et seq., 41 U.S.C. § 131, and others.
- Agencies affected: Government Accountability Office, Department of Homeland Security Office of Inspector General, United States Congress, Office of the Under Secretary for Science and Technology, Department of Homeland Security, Office of the Under Secretary for Management

Legislative history
- Introduced in the House as H.R. 4228 by Rep. Jeff Duncan (R, SC-3) on March 13, 2014; Committee consideration by United States House Committee on Homeland Security, United States House Homeland Security Subcommittee on Oversight and Management Efficiency; Passed the House on June 9, 2014 (voice vote)

The DHS Acquisition Accountability and Efficiency Act (H.R. 4228) is a bill that would direct the United States Department of Homeland Security (DHS) to improve the accountability, transparency, and efficiency of its major acquisition programs. The bill would specify procedures for the department to follow if it fails to meet timelines, cost estimates, or other performance parameters for these programs.

The bill was introduced into the United States House of Representatives during the 113th United States Congress.

== Background ==
The Department of Homeland Security spend at least $10 billion on acquisitions in 2013. A Government Accountability Office study of 2012 found that "only 16 of 42 acquisitions programs had approved baseline costs and identified 42 programs that experienced cost growth, scheduled slips, or both."

== Provisions of the bill ==
This summary is based largely on the summary provided by the Congressional Research Service, a public domain source.

The DHS Acquisition Accountability and Efficiency Act would amend the Homeland Security Act of 2002 to: (1) designate the Under Secretary for Management of the Department of Homeland Security (DHS) as the chief acquisition officer for DHS; (2) include the chief financial officer and the chief information officer of DHS in the DHS acquisition process; (3) establish the position of chief procurement officer under the under secretary for management to exercise leadership over the DHS procurement function and to issue acquisition regulations and policies; and (4) require the under secretary for management to take steps to improve the accountability, standardization, and transparency of major DHS acquisition programs.

The bill would direct the under secretary for management to: (1) establish an Acquisition Review Board to strengthen accountability and uniformity within the DHS acquisition review process, review acquisition programs, and review the use of best practices; and (2) establish DHS-wide policies to increase opportunities for effectiveness and efficiencies in the DHS major acquisition process. The bill would direct the Comptroller General (GAO) to conduct a review of the effectiveness of the Acquisition Review Board.

The bill would establish a process for notifying the congressional homeland security committees of a breach in a major DHS acquisition program (e.g., failure to meet any cost, schedule, or performance requirements). Directs the Under Secretary for Management to develop a plan for remediating a breach and for analyzing the root cause of the breach. Requires the DHS Secretary to submit to such committees a multiyear acquisition strategy to guide the overall direction of DHS acquisition, including a plan to address DHS acquisition workforce accountability and talent management and an assessment of the feasibility of conducting a pilot program to establish a Homeland Security Acquisition Workforce Development Fund to ensure that the DHS workforce has the capacity to perform its mission.

== Congressional Budget Office report ==
This summary is based largely on the summary provided by the Congressional Budget Office, as ordered reported by the House Committee on Homeland Security on April 30, 2014. This is a public domain source.

The Congressional Budget Office (CBO) estimates that implementing H.R. 4228 would cost $1 million in 2015 and less than $500,000 in each year thereafter, subject to the availability of appropriated funds. Enacting the legislation would not affect direct spending or revenues; therefore, pay-as-you-go procedures do not apply.

H.R. 4228 would direct the United States Department of Homeland Security (DHS) to improve the accountability, transparency, and efficiency of its major acquisition programs. The bill would specify procedures for the department to follow if it fails to meet timelines, cost estimates, or other performance parameters for these programs. In addition, H.R. 4228 would require DHS to prepare a comprehensive report each year on the status of its acquisition program and would direct the Government Accountability Office (GAO) and the DHS Inspector General to review and report on certain issues related to departmental acquisition policies.

Based on the cost of similar activities, CBO estimates that the new DHS administrative procedures as well as additional reviews and reports by GAO and DHS required by H.R. 4228 would cost $1 million in 2015 and less than $500,000 annually thereafter, assuming availability of appropriated funds. CBO expects that DHS will continue to seek to improve its efficiency in acquiring goods and services under current law; we have no basis for estimating any savings in procurement costs that might occur as a result of the bill’s directives to the department.

H.R. 4228 contains no intergovernmental or private-sector mandates as defined in the Unfunded Mandates Reform Act and would impose no costs on state, local, or tribal governments.

== Procedural history ==
The DHS Acquisition Accountability and Efficiency Act was introduced into the United States House of Representatives on March 13, 2014 by Rep. Jeff Duncan (R, SC-3). It was referred to the United States House Committee on Homeland Security and the United States House Homeland Security Subcommittee on Oversight and Management Efficiency. It was reported (amended) on May 6, 2014 alongside House Report 113-436. The House voted on June 9, 2014 to pass the bill in a voice vote.

== Debate and discussion ==
In addition to Rep. Duncan, the bill was initially co-sponsored by Reps. Michael McCaul (R-TX), Ron Barber (R-AZ), and Steve Daines (R-MO). Rep. Duncan argued that "for years, DHS's purchases of major homeland security systems have been late, cost more, and done less than promised. This bill will save taxpayer dollars by forcing DHS to improve its management."

A discussion draft of the bill received mixed reviews from industry insiders. On anonymous insider said that "much of the legislation either duplicates or reorganizing existing management processes that are already in statute" and that "it is time to start to focus on streamlining processes, not creating new, potentially duplicative ones." A different anonymous industry official had fewer objections to the draft bill, but pointed out that "there are risks of becoming so over-focused on process that you lose sight of the mission and outcome imperatives... process does not create excellence."

== See also ==
- List of bills in the 113th United States Congress
- Government procurement in the United States
