= John Cobin =

American-Chilean economist and politician

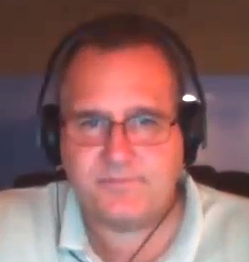
- Cobin in 2013
- Born: John Macarewich Cobin; March 10, 1963 (age 63); Santa Monica, California, U.S.
- Citizenship: Chilean
- Organization: http://www.policyofliberty.com
- Political party: League of the South; Libertarian (2006)
- Criminal charges: Serious injuries, property damage, unjustified shooting on a public way
- Criminal penalty: 6.1 years of prison
- Criminal status: sentence completed.
- Spouse: Pamela Sepúlveda Mendoza (m. 2010)
- Children: 7
- Parents: George Cobin (father); Joan Audrey Cobin (mother)
- Website: policyofliberty.com

John Macarewich Cobin (born 10 March 1963) is a U.S.-born blogger, convicted criminal, and social commentator. He renounced his US citizenship in December 2015 and holds Italian and Chilean citizenship. He has taught at various Chilean institutions and was arrested after opening fire at protesters who were blocking the road during the Chilean social unrest of 2019 in Reñaca, being released in 2025.

== Biography ==
John Cobin was born to Joan Audrey Cobin née Tagliere (born 1929), a nurse from New York, and George Cobin (1939-1966), a mathematician from Santa Monica, California. His father died from cancer in April 1966.

He studied at various educational institutions including Reformed Bible College, California State University, the University of California, and George Mason University. He holds a Ph.D. in public policy, an M.A. in economics, and an A.R.E. in liberal arts and religious studies.

He left the U.S. to live in Chile first in 1996, in protest of Bill Clinton's government due to its policies regarding taxation. The following year, he became a part-time economics lecturer.

In 2006, he ran for Congress in South Carolina's 4th congressional district as a member of the Libertarian party. He lost, earning 4,467 votes, or 2.5% of the total count.

During this time period, he was accused of choking, pushing and shoving his second wife multiple times during an argument over the custody of their son, causing her no injuries, and the charge was later expunged and seen as a mere attempt to gain custody of their son, Paul, more easily. He denied all accusations, but was arrested on charges of domestic violence yet release the next day. All of the charges were ultimately dropped. He fled the country shortly thereafter. He subsequently objected to paying either of his former wives child support, and is now estranged from many of his children.

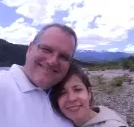
John Cobin with his third wife, Pamela Sepúlveda.

In 2012, along with three other Americans, he had the idea of creating a libertarian compound in the Chilean mountainside, titled "Galt’s Gulch", but was excluded by the other two partners, named in honor of the fictional capitalist society represented in Ayn Rand’s novel, Atlas Shrugged. The venture ultimately failed.

In 2013, he claimed that "there is no one more neoliberal than me in the country" in an interview with The Clinic. He also claimed that he was friends with Hermógenes Pérez de Arce Ibieta, a right-wing Chilean politician, and Axel Kaiser, a Chilean political scientist.

Until 2015, he was an economics teacher at the Andrés Bello National University. He renounced his US citizenship in December 2015.

=== 2019 Reñaca shooting ===
External videos
- John Cobin attacked in Reñaca and had to defend himself on YouTube (4 mins)

On November 10, 2019 he opened fire on Chilean demonstrators in Reñaca, Chile, wounding Luis Jesús Ahumada Villegas, a 33-year old protestor, in the leg. After this, he recorded a YouTube video, confessing to the crime and claiming that he acted in "self-defense". Due to this, he was convicted of attempted homicide and committing an unjustifiable shooting on public roads. Even though he claimed his actions were based on self-defense, the court rejected his explanation, commenting that "the requirements of legitimate defense are not met". He was sentenced to 11 years of jail time, which was later reduced to 6 years.

In 2020, Publimetro reported that he had tested positive for COVID-19.

== Electoral history ==
South Carolina 2006 Midterm Elections
Party	Candidate	Votes	%
Republican	Bob Inglis	115,553	64.2
Democratic	William Griffith	57,490	32.0
Libertarian	John Cobin	4,467	2.5
Green	C. Faye Walters	2,336	1.3
Write-in votes		85	nil
Total		179,931	100
