= Alliance for Full Acceptance =

American nonprofit organization

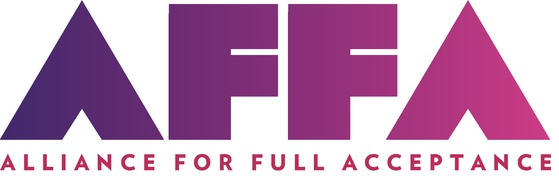
- Founded: 1998
- Type: Nonprofit organization
- Location: North Charleston, South Carolina
- Region served: Charleston, South Carolina
- Key people: Holly Whitfield, Executive Director
- Employees: 1
- Website: affa-sc.org

The Alliance for Full Acceptance (AFFA) is a nonprofit social justice organization dedicated to advocacy and education for lesbian, gay, bisexual, transgender, and queer (LGBTQ) people in the Charleston, South Carolina, area.

== History ==
AFFA was founded in 1998 in Charleston as an all-volunteer organization. Linda Ketner was the first president, serving until 2004. AFFA hired Warren Redman-Gress as its first executive director in 2002. Redman-Gress continued in that position until 2017. Chase Glenn was hired as the new executive director that same year. Ultimately, the goal of the organization is to fight for the equality of LGBTQ people in South Carolina. The Alliance for Full Acceptance works to achieve this by legislative action, promotional campaigns, and social events. The organization participated in a campaign opposing the referendum made in 2006, on Amendment 1. Amendment 1 declared it unconstitutional to perform or even recognize same sex marriages in the state of South Carolina.

AFFA produced and aired a radio show called "Equal Time" in 2006 and 2007. The show was intended for conversations about different LGBTQ topics led by local and national community members.

AFFA has helped other organizations by donating to projects involving LGBTQ youth in North Carolina, South Carolina, and Georgia. In addition to helping other states, Alliance for Full Acceptance has raised awareness on how to better LGBTQ issues through training sessions for schools, police departments, and psychologists.

The AFFA has very active members. In February 2021, executive director Chase Glenn spoke about his concerns on the House Bill 3477. Glenn spoke about how they aim for a space for people to share their personal experiences. The House Bill 3477 as Glenn says “is unnecessary, unenforceable, and it’s dangerous.” Glenn spoke out on how this bill will hurt the lives of transgender people and how it will be bad for the rest of the LGBTQ+ community.

== Programs ==
=== Amendment 1 Campaign ===
In 2006, a ballot referendum was held at the statewide level on Amendment 1 to the South Carolina state constitution, which proposed "A marriage between one man and one woman is the only lawful domestic union that shall be valid or recognized in this State." AFFA campaigned against the amendment with a radio show, billboards, and testimony at legislative session. The amendment was approved by 65% of voters in Charleston County and 78% of voters in the state as a whole.

=== LGBTQ Tri-County Community Needs Assessment ===
In 2018, AFFA, the College of Charleston Community Assistance Program, and the Medical University of South Carolina College of Health Professions worked together to create and administer a survey of LGBTQ people in Charleston, Dorchester, and Berkeley counties. AFFA published a report of the survey findings, which addressed the needs of LGBTQ people in the Tri-County area with regards to healthcare, the workplace, family life, and safety. In 2020, the issue with LGBTQ needing better healthcare is now relevant to the Coronavirus Pandemic. A recent study conducted by The Human Rights Campaign Foundation found that members of the LGBTQ community are more susceptible to the virus due to the fact that they are more likely to be working in the food service industry where there is an increase of cases. The LGBTQ community also faces health coverage gaps. On May 21, 2020, an advocacy group called the Campaign for Southern Equality opened applications for its COVID-19 rapid response grant program. $125,000 was distributed to LGBTQ Southerners impacted by COVID-19.

=== Grants ===
The Alliance for Full Acceptance also gives out grants. The AFFA will hand out these grants to organizations that are located in Georgia, North Carolina, or South Carolina who are “exempt from federal taxes under section 501(c)(3) of the Internal Revenue Code or utilizing a fiscal sponsor”. Organizations who receive these grants work with members of the LGBTQ+ community to help improve their lives. This grant can range from $500 to a max of $4000 per year from the AFFA Small Grants Program. Once you have received the grant, you submit a one year project once you have completed your project or program. This must include the following: how the grant will fulfil its purpose, what the outcomes were, and statistics of where you used the grant and how it affected the people in that area.

== See also ==
- LGBT rights in the United States
- LGBT history in the United States
