= United States House Foreign Affairs Subcommittee on Terrorism, Nonproliferation, and Trade =

The U.S. House Foreign Affairs Subcommittee on Terrorism, Nonproliferation, and Trade was a standing subcommittee within the House Foreign Affairs Committee.

== Jurisdiction ==
The subcommittee was one of two primary subcommittees with what the committee calls "functional jurisdiction", the other being the Oversight and Investigations Subcommittee. The Africa, Global Health, and Human Rights Subcommittee also enjoyed functional jurisdiction, but was primarily a "regional subcommittee".

According to the committee rules, the Terrorism Subcommittee had "oversight and legislative responsibilities over the United States’ efforts to manage and coordinate international programs to combat terrorism". It also had oversight over nonproliferation matters involving nuclear, chemical, and biological weapons, as well as weapons of mass destruction in general. It also oversaw international economic and trade policy; commerce with foreign countries; international investment policy. Agencies and organizations within its jurisdiction included the Overseas Private Investment Corporation, the U.S. Trade and Development Agency, and the Export-Import Bank.

== Members, 115th Congress ==
Majority	Minority
Ted Poe, Texas, Chairman; Joe Wilson, South Carolina; Darrell Issa, California; Paul Cook, California; Scott Perry, Pennsylvania; Lee Zeldin, New York; Brian Mast, Florida; Tom Garrett Jr., Virginia	Bill Keating, Massachusetts, Ranking Member; Lois Frankel, Florida; Brendan Boyle, Pennsylvania; Dina Titus, Nevada; Norma Torres, California; Brad Schneider, Illinois
