= Henry Brown (South Carolina politician) =

American politician (born 1935)

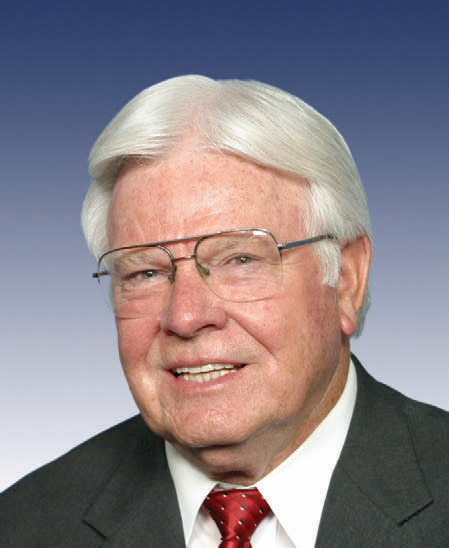

Member of the U.S. House of Representatives from South Carolina's 1st district
- In office January 3, 2001 – January 3, 2011
- Preceded by: Mark Sanford
- Succeeded by: Tim Scott

Member of the South Carolina House of Representatives from the 99th district
- In office June 25, 1985 – January 3, 2001
- Preceded by: Francis X. Archibald
- Succeeded by: James H. Merrill

Personal details
- Born: Henry Edward Brown Jr. December 20, 1935 (age 90) Bishopville, South Carolina, U.S.
- Party: Republican
- Spouse: Winifred Brown
- Education: Charleston Southern University; The Citadel; IBM Technical School

Military service
- Allegiance: United States
- Branch/service: United States Army
- Unit: United States National Guard • South Carolina National Guard

Henry Edward Brown Jr. (born December 20, 1935) is an American politician who was the U.S. representative for South Carolina's 1st congressional district from 2001 to 2011. He is a member of the Republican Party. He did not stand for re-election in 2010.

The district is based in Charleston and during Brown's tenure in office, took in almost all of the state's share of the Atlantic coastline (except for Beaufort and Hilton Head Island, which at that time were in the 2nd district).

== Early life ==
Brown was born in Bishopville, South Carolina. After graduating from Berkeley High School of Moncks Corner, South Carolina in 1953, Brown attended college at Charleston Southern University but did not graduate. He instead entered the IBM Management and Technical School. He then worked for the Piggly Wiggly grocery chain, becoming a vice president. Brown also spent 10 years as a member of the United States National Guard.

== Political career ==
Brown was elected to the Hanahan city council in 1981 and was later elected to the South Carolina House of Representatives in 1985 as a Republican from Berkeley County. Incumbent Francis Archibald resigned the seat and Brown won handily over opponent Ed Sessions in a June 1985 special election. When the Republicans gained control of the state house in 1994, Brown became chairman of the Ways and Means committee and helped deliver the largest tax cut in state history. He also served as chairman of the state's Joint Tax study Committee and was one of the vocal leaders of a massive 1998 tax proposal.

When 1st District Congressman Mark Sanford decided to honor a pledge to serve no more than six years in the House, Brown ran for the seat, passing out "Oh Henry" candy bars during the primary election as a way to increase his name recognition. He won the runoff with 55% over state Transportation Commissioner Harry "Buck" Limehouse and easily won the general election. The Democrats didn't even field a challenger in 2002 or 2004. In 2006, he won re-election by over 20 points, but surprisingly did not pass the 60% margin in a race against Democratic Randy Maatta and Green candidate Brian Merrill.

In the 2008 election, Brown faced Democratic nominee Linda Ketner. The district had been considered unwinnable for a Democrat since the 1990s round of redistricting shifted most of Charleston's black voters to the majority-black 6th District. However, polls from the summer of 2008 onward showed a closer-than-expected race. Ultimately, Brown barely held onto his seat, winning only 52 percent of the vote to Ketner's 48 percent—the closest race in the district in 22 years. Brown lost badly in Charleston County largely due to Barack Obama winning it with 54 percent of the vote—only the second time a Democratic presidential candidate has carried the county since 1956. However, Brown crushed Ketner in Berkeley and Dorchester counties, enabling him to secure a fifth term. He was also likely helped by John McCain carrying the district with 56 percent of the vote; aside from Jimmy Carter in 1976, the district had supported a Republican for president in every election since 1956.

On January 4, 2010, Brown announced that he would retire from the House and not seek re-election.

In June 2023, Brown endorsed Tim Scott in the 2024 United States presidential election.

== Forest fire controversy ==
In 2004, Henry Brown set a controlled burn on his own property, but the fire spread to the neighboring Francis Marion National Forest, burning 20 acres (81,000 m^{2}). Although he eventually paid a reduced fine of $4,747 in April 2008, the case cost the government an estimated $100,000 to resolve, and forced the Forest Service to rewrite a criminal code, making it much more difficult to prosecute those who negligently set fire to federal property. Brown commented regarding the affair that, "I was so taken aback that I'd be treated so impersonal — like I was some kind of crook...Those were criminal charges that were filed against me. I felt like I was the victim."

== Committee assignments ==
- Committee on Natural Resources
  - Subcommittee on Insular Affairs, Oceans and Wildlife (Ranking Member)
  - Subcommittee on National Parks, Forests and Public Lands
- Committee on Transportation and Infrastructure
  - Subcommittee on Highways and Transit
  - Subcommittee on Railroads, Pipelines, and Hazardous Materials
  - Subcommittee on Water Resources and Environment
- Committee on Veterans' Affairs
  - Subcommittee on Health (Chair)

Congressman Brown's committee assignments

== Electoral history ==
South Carolina's 1st congressional district: Results 2000–2008
Year	Republican	Votes	Pct	Democratic	Votes	Pct	3rd Party	Party	Votes	Pct	3rd Party	Party	Votes	Pct	3rd Party	Party	Votes	Pct
2000	Henry Brown	139,597	60%	Andy Brack	82,622	36%	Bill Woolsey	Libertarian	6,010	3%	Bob Batchelder	Reform	2,067	1%	Joe Innella	Natural Law	1,110	<1%
2002	Henry Brown	127,562	90%	no candidate			James E. Dunn	United Citizens	9,841	7%	Joe Innella	Natural Law	4,965	3%				
2004	Henry Brown	186,448	88%	no candidate			James E. Dunn	Green	25,674	12%								
2006	Henry Brown	115,766	60%	Randy Maatta *	73,218	38%	James E. Dunn	Green	4,287	2%								
2008	Henry Brown	177,540	52%	Linda Ketner	163,724	48%												

*Write-in and minor candidate notes: In 2000, write-ins received 40 votes. In 2002, write-ins received 57 votes. In 2004, write-ins received 186 votes. In 2006, write-ins received 104 votes. In 2006, Randy Maatta also ran under the Working Families party. In 2008, write-ins received 615 votes.

== See also ==
- United States House of Representatives elections in South Carolina, 2008#District 1

U.S. House of Representatives
Preceded by Mark Sanford	Member of the U.S. House of Representatives from South Carolina's 1st congressional district 2001–2011	Succeeded by Tim Scott
U.S. order of precedence (ceremonial)
Preceded by Robin Tallon as Former U.S. Representative	Order of precedence of the United States as Former U.S. Representative	Succeeded by Tom Rice as Former U.S. Representative
