= 2006 South Carolina Amendment 1 =

South Carolinian anti-same-sex marriage constitutional amendment

Amendment 1
- November 7, 2006
- Marriage Act

Results
| Choice | Votes | % |
|---|---|---|
| Yes | 829,360 | 77.97% |
| No | 234,316 | 22.03% |
| Valid votes | 1,063,676 | 97.41% |
| Invalid or blank votes | 28,276 | 2.59% |
| Total votes | 1,091,952 | 100.00% |
| Registered voters/turnout | 2,452,714 | 43.37% |
County results
Yes
90–100%
80–90%
70–80%
60–70%

South Carolina Amendment 1 of 2006 amended the South Carolina Constitution to make it unconstitutional for the U.S. state to recognize or perform same-sex marriages or civil unions. The referendum was approved by 78% of voters. Unlike the other sixteen such state amendments, South Carolina's explicitly disavows any effort to prevent private contracts between same-sex partners from being recognized—Virginia being the only state to do so.

The text of South Carolina Amendment 1 states:

A marriage between one man and one woman is the only lawful domestic union that shall be valid or recognized in this State. This State and its political subdivisions shall not create a legal status, right, or claim respecting any other domestic union, however denominated. This State and its political subdivisions shall not recognize or give effect to a legal status, right, or claim created by another jurisdiction respecting any other domestic union, however denominated. Nothing in this section shall impair any right or benefit extended by the State or its political subdivisions other than a right or benefit arising from a domestic union that is not valid or recognized in this State. This section shall not prohibit or limit parties, other than the State or its political subdivisions, from entering into contracts or other legal instruments.

== See also ==
- Recognition of same-sex unions in South Carolina
- South Carolina state elections, 2006
