= 2025 United States state legislative elections =

- November 4, 2025

2 legislative chambers 2 states
	Majority party	Minority party	Third party
Party	Republican	Democratic	Coalition
Chambers before	57 (Note: The Minnesota House of Representatives is tied, so it is not counted towards either total.)	39	2 (Note: A coalition of 14 Democrats, 5 Independents, and 2 Republicans controls the Alaska House of Representatives. A coalition of 9 Democrats and 5 Republicans controls the Alaska Senate.)
Chambers after	57	39	2
Overall change	Steady	Steady	Steady
- Map of upper house elections: Special elections held or to be held No regularly-scheduled elections

- Map of lower house elections: Democratic hold Special elections held or to be held No regularly-scheduled elections

The 2025 United States state legislative elections were held on November 4, 2025, for two state legislative chambers in two states. Across the fifty states, 3 percent of all lower house seats were up for election, with no upper house having regularly scheduled elections. These elections take place concurrently with several other state and local elections, including the 2025 gubernatorial elections.

Democrats expanded their majorities in the Virginia House of Delegates and the New Jersey General Assembly, gaining a supermajority in the latter, in the November general election. They also flipped seven legislative seats across the country in special elections throughout the year while generally outperforming districts' partisan lean in other races. Several other special elections determined partisan control of legislative chambers, though each party held their respective seats in these, resulting in no change of control. This is the first time that no state legislative chamber has changed partisan control since 2015.

== Background ==
The 2025 state legislative elections were the first held during the second presidency of Donald Trump following his victory in the 2024 presidential election. Republicans had seen very modest coattails in the 2024 legislative elections, flipping a net of just over 50 seats from the Democrats and breaking Democratic trifectas in two states, but establishing no new trifectas of their own. Entering 2025, Republicans fully controlled 23 state governments, Democrats controlled 15, while 12 states were under split control. Only two states held regularly-scheduled legislative elections in 2025: New Jersey, which Democrats fully controlled, and Virginia, where Democrats controlled the legislature but not the governorship.

=== Party switching ===
Total net change in legislative seats due to party switching in 2025: +1 Rep seat / +1 Dem seat / +1 Ind/Fwd seat +2 Ind seats

Seven incumbent state legislators switched political parties during 2025, four leaving the Democratic Party and three leaving the Republican Party. In March, Daniel Thatcher, a moderate Republican Utah Senator left the party and joined the Utah Forward Party. Florida Senate Democratic leader Jason Pizzo announced he was leaving the Democratic Party to become an independent in April 2025, citing the party's recent decline in power the state. He later announced an Independent run for governor of Florida. In May, Robin L. Webb, the last remaining rural Democratic member of the Kentucky Senate, left the party and joined the Republican supermajority. In June, Maine state senator Rick Bennett left the Republican Party and became an Independent, while simultaneously announcing a bid for governor of the state. In August, Maine state representative W. Edward Crockett left the Democratic Party and became an Independent for the same reason. In September, Republican Oregon State Representative Cyrus Javadi switched political parties and joined the Democratic supermajority. Later in September, South Dakota State Representative Peri Pourier left the Democratic Party and joined the Republican Party.

State	Chamber	District	Legislator	Old party	New party	Source
Florida	Senate	37	Jason Pizzo	Democratic	Independent	
Kentucky	Senate	18	Robin L. Webb	Democratic	Republican	
Maine	Senate	18	Rick Bennett	Republican	Independent	
Maine	House	112	W. Edward Crockett	Democratic	Independent	
Oregon	House	32	Cyrus Javadi	Republican	Democratic	
South Dakota	House	27	Peri Pourier	Democratic	Republican	
Utah	Senate	11	Daniel Thatcher	Republican	Forward	
Vermont	House	Chittenden-15	Troy Headrick	Progressive	Independent	

== Issues ==
Affordability emerged as the defining issue of all the 2025 elections, beyond the state legislative level. While this worked in Republicans' favor in 2024, when Democrats held power, voters shifted their blame towards Republicans as the issue persisted amid Donald Trump's second term in office. Democrats particularly homed in on the cost of electricity amid rate hikes tied to the construction of artificial intelligence data centers. The election also took place during the 2025 government shutdown, caused by disagreements over federal healthcare subsidies, which particularly affected Virginia.

== Summary table ==
Regularly scheduled elections are to be held in two of the 99 state legislative chambers in the United States. Nationwide, regularly scheduled elections are to be held for 180 of the 7,383 legislative seats. This table only covers regularly scheduled elections; additional special elections will take place concurrently with these regularly scheduled elections.

State	Lower house			
State	Seats up	Total	% up	Term
New Jersey	80	80	100	2
Virginia	100	100	100	2

== Election predictions ==
Several sites and individuals publish predictions of competitive chambers. These predictions look at factors such as the strength of the party, the strength of the candidates, and the partisan leanings of the state (reflected in part by the state's Cook Partisan Voting Index rating). The predictions assign ratings to each chambers, with the rating indicating the predicted advantage that a party has in winning that election.

Most election predictors use:

- "Tossup": No advantage
- "Tilt": Advantage that is not quite as strong as "lean"
- "Lean": Slight advantage
- "Likely": Significant, but surmountable, advantage
- "Safe" or "Solid": Near-certain chance of victory

State	PVI	Chamber	Last election	State Navigate October 1, 2025	Result
New Jersey	D+4	General Assembly	D 52–28	Safe D	D 57–23
Virginia	D+3	House of Delegates	D 51–49	Safe D	D 64–36

== National results ==
Democrats performed extremely well in the off-year elections, flipping 25 Republican-held legislative seats out of the 118 that were up, while losing none of their own. They gained 18 across the regularly-scheduled elections in Virginia and New Jersey and an additional 7 through special elections. These gains came amid electoral victories across the country, both at the statewide level and at the local level, for the Democratic Party. In contested special elections, Democrats performed 13 percentage points better on average than they did in the 2024 presidential election. No state legislative chambers changed partisan control, but Democrats gained a supermajority in the New Jersey General Assembly while breaking Republican supermajorities in the Mississippi Senate and Iowa Senate.

Multiple sources have compared the results to those from the 2017 elections, where Democrats made gains in both regular and special elections as a precursor to the blue wave 2018 election. These gains were attributed to the declining approval ratings of Republican President Donald Trump, as well as a focus on affordability. Democrats are attempting to maintain this electoral momentum into the 2026 elections, where they are targeting control of state legislative chambers in battleground states across the country, as well as attempting to break Republican supermajorities in several other states.

== State summaries ==
=== New Jersey ===
General Assembly results

All of the seats of the New Jersey General Assembly were up for election in 2025. Democrats had controlled the chamber since the 2001 elections. Democrats gained a supermajority in the chamber, flipping five seats for their largest majority since 1973.

New Jersey General Assembly
Party	Leader	Before	After	Change
Democratic	Craig Coughlin	52	57	▲5
Republican	John DiMaio	28	23	▼5
Total		80	80	Steady

=== Virginia ===
House of Delegates results

All of the seats of the Virginia House of Delegates were up for election in 2025. Democrats had controlled the chamber since the 2023 elections. Democrats won in a landslide, gaining 13 seats, greatly expanding their majority, their largest since 1987. The most immediate effect of this victory was the survival of Democratic plans to pass a constitutional amendment to allow them to redraw the state's congressional districts amidst a flurry of mid-decade redistricting across the country. The amendment needs to pass the legislature in two consecutive legislative sessions before being sent to voters.

Virginia House of Delegates
Party	Leader	Before	After	Change
Democratic	Don Scott	51	64	▲13
Republican	Terry Kilgore	49	36	▼13
Total		100	100	Steady

== Special elections ==
Total net change in legislative seats due to special elections in 2025 +1 Dem seat +2 Dem seats +3 Dem seats

There were 93 state, 1 territorial, and 1 informal legislative special elections held in 2025. Four seats flipped parties in vacancy-related special elections: Georgia's 121st House District, Iowa's 1st and 35th Senate Districts, and Pennsylvania's 36th Senate District flipped from Republican to Democratic. Special elections called due to court-ordered redistricting in Mississippi allowed Democrats to break the Republican supermajority in the Mississippi Senate as well, gaining two seats, and gain one seat in the Mississippi House of Representatives. Many Democratic special election candidates have outperformed Kamala Harris' 2024 performance in their respective districts, often by 10 percentage points or more, but almost all featured turnout less than half of that of the 2024 election.

Democrats have additionally maintained their narrow control of the Minnesota Senate, Pennsylvania House of Representatives, Virginia Senate, and Virginia House of Delegates, through special election victories, as well as reaffirming the tie in the Minnesota House of Representatives. Their gains in the Iowa Senate and Mississippi Senate allowed them to break the Republican supermajorities in those chambers as well.

=== Alabama ===
District		Incumbent			This race	
Chamber	No.	Representative	Party	First elected	Results	Candidates
Senate	5	Greg Reed	Republican	2010	Incumbent resigned January 1, 2025, to join Governor Kay Ivey's administration. New member elected June 24, 2025. Republican hold.	▌ ✓ Matt Woods (Republican) 86.0%; ▌Ryan Cagle (Democratic) 13.8%
House	11	Randall Shedd	Republican	2013 (special)	Incumbent resigned February 17, 2025, to become director of constituent affairs for Senate President Pro Tempore Garlan Gudger. New member elected August 26, 2025. Republican hold.	▌ ✓ Heath Allbright (Republican) 88.8%; ▌Alexandria Braswell (Democratic) 11.2%
House	13	Matt Woods	Republican	2022	Incumbent resigned June 27, 2025, to join the State Senate. New member elected September 30, 2025, after the general election was cancelled. Republican hold.	▌ ✓ Greg Barnes (Republican)
House	12	Corey Harbison	Republican	2014	Incumbent resigned April 16, 2025, to focus on time with his family. New member elected October 28, 2025. Republican hold.	▌ ✓ Cindy Myrex (Republican) 87.1%; ▌Matthew Glover (Democratic) 12.8%

=== California ===
District		Incumbent			This race	
Chamber	No.	Representative	Party	First elected	Results	Candidates
Assembly	32	Vince Fong	Republican	2016	Incumbent resigned May 24, 2024, to become a U.S. representative. (Note: In the 2024 election, Fong filed to run for re-election to his Assembly seat and also filed to run for U.S. House. He resigned his Assembly seat on May 24 after winning a special election for the U.S. House seat three days earlier. Fong attempted to withdraw from the State Assembly race, but per California law, his name could not be removed from the ballot. Despite unofficially dropping out of the race, Fong was re-elected to his State Assembly seat in the November 2024 general election, necessitating a special election.); New member elected February 25, 2025. Republican hold.	▌ ✓ Stan Ellis (Republican) 64.6%; ▌Chris Cruz-Boone (Democratic) 28.7%; ▌Holli Willibey (Republican) 4.4%; ▌William Brown (Libertarian) 2.3%
Senate	36	Janet Nguyen	Republican	2022	Incumbent resigned November 30, 2024, to join the Orange County Board of Supervisors. New member elected February 25, 2025. Republican hold.	▌ ✓ Tony Strickland (Republican) 51.3%; ▌Jimmy Pham (Democratic) 27.7%; ▌Julie Diep (Democratic) 14.3%; ▌John Briscoe (Republican) 6.7%
Assembly	63	Bill Essayli	Republican	2022	Incumbent resigned April 1, 2025, to become U.S. attorney for the Central District of California. New member elected August 26, 2025, after no one received over 50% of the vote on June 24, 2025. Republican hold.	▌ ✓ Natasha Johnson (Republican) 53.5%; ▌Chris Shoults (Democratic) 46.5%

=== Connecticut ===
District		Incumbent			This race	
Chamber	No.	Representative	Party	First elected	Results	Candidates
House	40	Christine Conley	Democratic	2016	Incumbent resigned January 7, 2025, after being nominated to the Workers' Compensation Commission. New member elected February 25, 2025. Democratic hold.	▌▌ ✓ Dan Gaiewski (Democratic) 68.9%; ▌Robert Boris (Republican) 31.1%
Senate	21	Kevin C. Kelly	Republican	2010	Incumbent resigned January 8, 2025, after being nominated to the Connecticut Superior Court. New member elected February 25, 2025. Republican hold.	▌ ✓ Jason Perillo (Republican) 53.5%; ▌Tony Afriyie (Democratic) 46.5%
House	113	Jason Perillo	Republican	2007 (special)	Incumbent resigned February 28, 2025 to join the State Senate. New member elected April 22, 2025. Republican hold.	▌ ✓ Amy Romano (Republican) 52.5%; ▌Michael Duncan (Democratic) 47.5%

=== Delaware ===
District		Incumbent			This race	
Chamber	No.	Representative	Party	First elected	Results	Candidates
Senate	1	Sarah McBride	Democratic	2020	Incumbent resigned January 2, 2025, to become a U.S. representative. New member elected February 15, 2025. Democratic hold.	▌ ✓ Dan Cruce (Democratic) 77.1%; ▌Steve Washington (Republican) 20.9%; ▌Liv Figliola (Nonpartisan) 1.9%
Senate	5	Kyle Evans Gay	Democratic	2020	Incumbent resigned January 21, 2025, to become Lieutenant Governor of Delaware. New member elected February 15, 2025. Democratic hold.	▌ ✓ Ray Seigfried (Democratic) 65.1%; ▌Brent Burdge (Republican) 34.7%
House	20	Stell Parker Selby	Democratic	2022	Incumbent resigned June 24, 2025, due to long-term absence following a stroke. New member elected August 5, 2025. Democratic hold.	▌ ✓ Alonna Berry (Democratic) 50.6%; ▌Nikki Miller (Republican) 49.3%

=== Florida ===
District		Incumbent			This race	
Chamber	No.	Representative	Party	First elected	Results	Candidates
House	3	Joel Rudman	Republican	2022	Incumbent resigned January 1, 2025, to run for U.S. House. New member elected June 10, 2025. Republican hold.	▌ ✓ Nathan Boyles (Republican) 67.1%; ▌Dondre Wise (Democratic) 32.9%
House	32	Debbie Mayfield	Republican	2024	Incumbent resigned June 9, 2025, to run for State Senate. New member elected June 10, 2025. Republican hold.	▌ ✓ Brian Hodgers (Republican) 55.3%; ▌Juan Hinojosa (Democratic) 44.7%
Senate	19	Randy Fine	Republican	2024	Incumbent resigned March 31, 2025, to run for U.S. House. New member elected June 10, 2025. Republican hold.	▌ ✓ Debbie Mayfield (Republican) 54.4%; ▌Vance Ahrens (Democratic) 45.6%
House	40	LaVon Bracy Davis	Democratic	2022	Incumbent resigned September 1, 2025, to run for State Senate. New member elected September 2, 2025. Democratic hold.	▌ ✓ RaShon Young (Democratic) 75.0%; ▌Tuan Le (Republican) 24.9%
Senate	15	Geraldine Thompson	Democratic	2022	Incumbent died February 13, 2025, after complications from knee surgery. New member elected September 2, 2025. Democratic hold.	▌ ✓ LaVon Bracy Davis (Democratic) 72.6%; ▌Willie Montague (Republican) 27.4%
House	90	Joseph Casello	Democratic	2018	Incumbent died July 18, 2025, of a heart attack. New member elected December 9, 2025. Democratic hold.	▌ ✓ Rob Long (Democratic) 63.2%; ▌Maria Zack (Republican) 35.9%; ▌Karen Yeh (Independent) 1.0%
Senate	11	Blaise Ingoglia	Republican	2022	Incumbent resigned July 21, 2025, to become the Chief Financial Officer of Florida. New member elected December 9, 2025. Republican hold.	▌ ✓ Ralph Massullo (Republican) 59.2%; ▌Ash Marwah (Democratic) 40.8%

=== Georgia ===
District		Incumbent			This race	
Chamber	No.	Representative	Party	First elected	Results	Candidates
Senate	21	Brandon Beach	Republican	2012	Incumbent resigned May 6, 2025, to become Treasurer of the United States. New member elected September 23, 2025, after no one received over 50% of the vote on August 26, 2025. Republican hold.	▌ ✓ Jason Dickerson (Republican) 61.5%; ▌Debra Shigley (Democratic) 38.5%
House	106	Shelly Hutchinson	Democratic	2018	Incumbent resigned September 4, 2025, to take a caregiver role for an ailing family member. New member elected December 2, 2025, after no one received over 50% of the vote on November 4, 2025. Democratic hold.	▌ ✓ Akbar Ali (Democratic) 54.4%; ▌Marqus Cole (Democratic) 45.6%
Senate	35	Jason Esteves	Democratic	2022	Incumbent resigned September 10, 2025, to focus on his run for governor. New member elected December 16, 2025, after no one received over 50% of the vote on November 18, 2025. Democratic hold.	▌ ✓ Jaha Howard (Democratic) 51.9%; ▌Roger Bruce (Democratic) 48.1%
House	121	Marcus Wiedower	Republican	2018	Incumbent resigned October 28, 2025, to focus on his employment. New member elected December 9, 2025. Democratic gain.	▌ ✓ Eric Gisler (Democratic) 50.9%; ▌Mack "Dutch" Guest IV (Republican) 49.1%

=== Iowa ===
District		Incumbent			This race	
Chamber	No.	Representative	Party	First elected	Results	Candidates
Senate	35	Chris Cournoyer	Republican	2018	Incumbent resigned December 16, 2024, to become Lieutenant Governor of Iowa. New member elected January 28, 2025. Democratic gain.	▌ ✓ Mike Zimmer (Democratic) 51.7%; ▌Katie Whittington (Republican) 48.1%
House	100	Martin Graber	Republican	2020	Incumbent died January 31, 2025. New member elected March 11, 2025. Republican hold.	▌ ✓ Blaine Watkins (Republican) 51.5%; ▌Nannette Griffin (Democratic) 48.2%
House	78	Sami Scheetz	Democratic	2022	Incumbent resigned April 1, 2025, to join the Linn County Board of Supervisors. New member elected April 29, 2025. Democratic hold.	▌ ✓ Angel Ramirez (Democratic) 79.1%; ▌Bernie Hayes (Republican) 20.8%
Senate	1	Rocky De Witt	Republican	2022	Incumbent died June 25, 2025, of pancreatic cancer. New member elected August 26, 2025. Democratic gain.	▌ ✓ Catelin Drey (Democratic) 55.2%; ▌Christopher Prosch (Republican) 44.7%
House	7	Mike Sexton	Republican	2014	Incumbent resigned September 19, 2025, after being appointed Iowa state director for USDA Rural Development. New member elected December 9, 2025. Republican hold.	▌ ✓ Wendy Larson (Republican) 70.0%; ▌Rachel Burns (Democratic) 29.9%
Senate	16	Claire Celsi	Democratic	2018	Incumbent died October 6, 2025 while in hospice care. New member elected December 30, 2025. Democratic hold.	▌ ✓ Renee Hardman (Democratic) 71.4%; ▌Lucas Loftin (Republican) 28.5%

=== Kentucky ===
District		Incumbent			This race	
Chamber	No.	Representative	Party	First elected	Results	Candidates
Senate	37	David Yates	Democratic	2020	Incumbent resigned October 8, 2025, to become Jefferson County Clerk. New member elected December 16, 2025. Democratic hold.	▌ ✓ Gary Clemons (Democratic) 72.6%; ▌Calvin Leach (Republican) 25.1%; ▌Wendy Higdon (Libertarian) 2.3%

=== Louisiana ===
District		Incumbent			This race	
Chamber	No.	Representative	Party	First elected	Results	Candidates
Senate	14	Cleo Fields	Democratic	2019	Incumbent resigned December 31, 2024, to become a U.S. representative. New member elected February 15, 2025. Democratic hold.	▌ ✓ Larry Selders (Democratic) 62.4%; ▌Carolyn Hill (Democratic) 20.4%; ▌Quentin Anderson (Democratic) 17.3%
Senate	23	Jean-Paul Coussan	Republican	2023	Incumbent resigned December 31, 2024, to join the Louisiana Public Service Commission. New member elected February 15, 2025. Republican hold.	▌ ✓ Brach Myers (Republican) 54.8%; ▌Jesse Regan (Republican) 45.2%
House	45	Brach Myers	Republican	2023	Incumbent resigned March 11, 2025 to join the State Senate. New member elected outright after the May 3, 2025, special election was cancelled. Republican hold.	▌ ✓ Annie Spell (Republican)
House	67	Larry Selders	Democratic	2019	Incumbent resigned March 11, 2025 to join the State Senate. New member elected May 3, 2025. Democratic hold.	▌ ✓ Terry Landry Jr. (Democratic) 51.8%; ▌Malcolm Myer (Democratic) 42.2%; ▌"Sonny" Marchbanks (Democratic) 6.0%

=== Maine ===
District		Incumbent			This race	
Chamber	No.	Representative	Party	First elected	Results	Candidates
House	24	Joe Perry	Democratic	2019 (special)	Incumbent resigned December 4, 2024, to become the Maine State Treasurer. New member elected February 25, 2025. Democratic hold.	▌ ✓ Sean Faircloth (Democratic) 71.7%; ▌Carolyn Fish (Republican) 28.3%

=== Massachusetts ===
District		Incumbent			This race	
Chamber	No.	Representative	Party	First elected	Results	Candidates
House	Essex 6	Jerry Parisella	Democratic	2010	Incumbent resigned January 1, 2025, to become a District Court judge. New member elected May 13, 2025. Democratic hold.	▌ ✓ Hannah Bowen (Democratic) 73.4%; ▌Medley Long III (Republican) 26.1%
House	Bristol 3	Carol Doherty	Democratic	2020 (special)	Incumbent died February 15, 2025, of pancreatic cancer. New member elected June 10, 2025. Democratic hold.	▌ ✓ Lisa Field (Democratic) 50.1%; ▌Larry Quintal (Republican) 49.8%

=== Minnesota ===
District		Incumbent			This race	
Chamber	No.	Representative	Party	First elected	Results	Candidates
Senate	60	Kari Dziedzic	DFL	2012 (special)	Incumbent died December 27, 2024, of ovarian cancer. New member elected January 28, 2025. Democratic (DFL) hold.	▌ ✓ Doron Clark (DFL) 90.9%; ▌Abigail Wolters (Republican) 8.7%
House	40B	Jamie Becker-Finn	DFL	2016	Incumbent's term expired January 14, 2025. Representative-elect Curtis Johnson was ruled ineligible to serve for violating Minnesota's residency requirement. New member elected March 11, 2025. (Note: Governor Tim Walz previously scheduled the special election for January 28. However, the Minnesota Supreme Court ruled that it was called prematurely, prompting its rescheduling.); Democratic (DFL) hold.	▌ ✓ David Gottfried (DFL) 70.2%; ▌Paul Wikstrom (Republican) 29.8%
Senate	6	Justin Eichorn	Republican	2016	Incumbent resigned March 20, 2025, after being arrested for soliciting a minor for sex. New member elected April 29, 2025. Republican hold.	▌ ✓ Keri Heintzeman (Republican) 60.3%; ▌Denise Slipy (DFL) 39.6%
House	34B	Melissa Hortman	DFL	2004	Incumbent assassinated June 14, 2025. New member elected September 16, 2025. Democratic (DFL) hold.	▌ ✓ Xp Lee (DFL) 60.8%; ▌Ruth Bittner (Republican) 39.1%
Senate	29	Bruce Anderson	Republican	2012	Incumbent died July 21, 2025. New member elected November 4, 2025. Republican hold.	▌ ✓ Michael Holmstrom Jr. (Republican) 62.2%; ▌Louis McNutt (DFL) 37.7%
Senate	47	Nicole Mitchell	DFL	2022	Incumbent resigned July 25, 2025, after being convicted of burglary. New member elected November 4, 2025. Democratic (DFL) hold.	▌ ✓ Amanda Hemmingsen-Jaeger (DFL) 61.7%; ▌Dwight Dorau (Republican) 38.2%

=== Mississippi ===
District		Incumbent			This race	
Chamber	No.	Representative	Party	First elected	Results	Candidates
Senate	18	Jenifer Branning	Republican	2015	Incumbent resigned January 6, 2025, to join the Mississippi Supreme Court. New member elected April 15, 2025. Republican hold.	▌ ✓ Lane Taylor (Nonpartisan) 56.9%; ▌Mark Forsman (Nonpartisan) 26.1%; ▌Lindsey Kidd (Nonpartisan) 10.9%; ▌Ike Melton (Nonpartisan) 3.9%; ▌Marty Sistrunk (Nonpartisan) 2.1%
House	23	Andy Stepp	Republican	2023	Incumbent died December 5, 2024. New member elected April 22, 2025 after no one received over 50% of the vote on March 25, 2025. Republican hold.	▌ ✓ Perry Van Bailey (Nonpartisan) 50.6%; ▌Colby Bollinger (Nonpartisan) 49.4%
House	82	Charles Young Jr.	Democratic	2011	Incumbent died December 19, 2024. New member elected April 22, 2025 after no one received over 50% of the vote on March 25, 2025. Democratic hold.	▌ ✓ Gregory Elliott (Nonpartisan) 65.5%; ▌Joe Norwood (Nonpartisan) 34.5%
House	26	Orlando Paden	Democratic	2015	Incumbent resigned June 30, 2025 to become the Mayor of Clarksdale. New member elected November 4, 2025. Democratic hold.	▌ ✓ Otha Williams (Nonpartisan) 52.6%; ▌Kim Seals (Nonpartisan) 33.8%; ▌Mary Dear-Moton (Nonpartisan) 13.5%
Senate	24	David Lee Jordan	Democratic	1993	Incumbent resigned June 30, 2025, to spend time with his family. New member elected December 2, 2025, after no one received over 50% of the vote on November 4, 2025. Democratic hold.	▌ ✓ Justin Pope (Nonpartisan) 54.0%; ▌Curressia Brown (Nonpartisan) 46.0%
Senate	26	John Horhn	Democratic	1992	Incumbent resigned June 30, 2025 to become the Mayor of Jackson. New member elected December 2, 2025, after no one received over 50% of the vote on November 4, 2025. Democratic hold.	▌ ✓ Kamesha Mumford (Nonpartisan) 55.9%; ▌Letitia Johnson (Nonpartisan) 44.1%

==== Redistricting elections ====
Nine special elections for the Mississippi Senate and five special elections for the Mississippi House of Representatives were held on November 4, 2025. These special elections were called as a result of redistricting mandated by a federal court designed to increase the number of majority-Black districts in both chambers to comply with the Voting Rights Act. Democrats flipped a total of three seats, breaking the Republican supermajority in the state Senate.

Mississippi State Senate
Party	Before	Up	Won	After	Change
Republican	36	7	5	34	▼2
Democratic	16	2	4	18	▲2
Total	52	9	9	52	Steady

Mississippi House of Representatives
Party	Before	Up	Won	After	Change
Republican	79	2	1	78	▼1
Democratic	41	3	4	42	▲1
Independent	2	0	0	2	Steady
Total	122	5	5	122	Steady

=== New Hampshire ===
District		Incumbent			This race	
Chamber	No.	Representative	Party	First elected	Results	Candidates
House	Strafford 12	Dawn Evans	Democratic	2024	Representative-elect resigned December 2, 2024, after moving out of her district. New member elected June 24, 2025. Democratic hold.	▌ ✓ Billie Butler (Democratic) 55.5%; ▌Ken Hilton (Republican) 44.5%
House	Coos 5	Brian Valerino	Republican	2024	Incumbent resigned June 19, 2025, after being appointed warden of the Northern New Hampshire Correctional Facility. New member elected November 4, 2025. Republican hold.	▌ ✓ Marc Tremblay (Republican) 50.1%; ▌Corinne Cascadden (Democratic) 49.9%

=== New Jersey ===
District		Incumbent			This race	
Chamber	No.	Representative	Party	First elected	Results	Candidates
Senate	35	Nellie Pou	Democratic	2011	Incumbent resigned January 3, 2025, to become a U.S. representative. Interim appointee elected November 4, 2025. (Note: Benjie Wimberly was appointed as interim senator by members of the Bergen County and Passaic County Democratic Committees on January 16, 2025.); Democratic hold.	▌ ✓ Benjie Wimberly (Democratic) 72.6%; ▌Frank Filippelli (Republican) 27.4%

=== New York ===
District		Incumbent			This race	
Chamber	No.	Representative	Party	First elected	Results	Candidates
Senate	22	Simcha Felder	Democratic	2012	Incumbent resigned April 9, 2025, to join the New York City Council. New member elected May 20, 2025. Democratic hold.	▌ ✓ Sam Sutton (Democratic) 66.8%; ▌▌Nachman Caller (Republican) 32.1%; ▌Write-in 1.1%
Assembly	115	Billy Jones	Democratic	2016	Incumbent resigned August 29, 2025, for personal reasons. New member elected November 4, 2025. Democratic hold.	▌▌ ✓ Michael Cashman (Democratic) 51.6%; ▌▌Brent Davison (Republican) 47.2%

=== Oklahoma ===
District		Incumbent			This race	
Chamber	No.	Representative	Party	First elected	Results	Candidates
Senate	8	Roger Thompson	Republican	2014	Incumbent resigned November 1, 2024. New member elected May 13, 2025. Republican hold.	▌ ✓ Bryan Logan (Republican) 61.6%; ▌Nathan Brewer (Democratic) 29.7%; ▌Steve Sanford (Independent) 8.7%
House	71	Amanda Swope	Democratic	2022	Incumbent resigned January 28, 2025, to become director of the Tulsa Office of Tribal Policy and Partnerships. New member elected June 10, 2025. Democratic hold.	▌ ✓ Amanda Clinton (Democratic) 84.7%; ▌Beverly Atteberry (Republican) 15.3%
House	74	Mark Vancuren	Republican	2018	Incumbent resigned January 1, 2025, to become a Deputy Tulsa County Commissioner. New member elected June 10, 2025. Republican hold.	▌ ✓ Kevin Norwood (Republican) 64.6%; ▌Amy Hossain (Democratic) 35.4%
House	97	Jason Lowe	Democratic	2016	Incumbent resigned April 7, 2025, to become an Oklahoma County commissioner. New member elected June 10, 2025, after the general election was cancelled. Democratic hold.	▌ ✓ Aletia Timmons (Democratic)

=== Pennsylvania ===
District		Incumbent			This race	
Chamber	No.	Representative	Party	First elected	Results	Candidates
House	35	Matthew Gergely	Democratic	2023 (special)	Incumbent died January 19, 2025, after suffering a medical emergency. New member elected March 25, 2025. Democratic hold.	▌ ✓ Dan Goughnour (Democratic) 63.4%; ▌Charles Davis (Republican) 35.0%; ▌Adam Kitta (Libertarian) 1.6%
Senate	36	Ryan Aument	Republican	2014	Incumbent resigned December 31, 2024, to become state director for U.S. Senator Dave McCormick. New member elected March 25, 2025. Democratic gain.	▌ ✓ James Malone (Democratic) 50.0%; ▌Josh Parsons (Republican) 49.1%; ▌Zachary Moore (Libertarian) 0.9%

=== Puerto Rico ===
District		Incumbent			This race	
Chamber	No.	Representative	Party	First elected	Results	Candidates
House	31	Vimarie Peña Dávila	New Progressive Party	2024	Incumbent resigned August 18, 2025 to become the Mayor of Gurabo. New member be elected September 28, 2025. New Progressive hold.	▌ ✓ Roberto López Román (New Progressive) 31.6%; ▌Alberto Fradera (New Progressive) 29.6%; ▌Michael López Saldaña (New Progressive) 19.3%; ▌Ana Margarita Ruíz Ramos (New Progressive) 15.7%; ▌José Cabán (New Progressive) 3.8%

=== Rhode Island ===
District		Incumbent			This race	
Chamber	No.	Senator	Party	First elected	Results	Candidates
Senate	4	Dominick J. Ruggerio	Democratic	1984	Incumbent died April 21, 2025, of cancer. New member elected August 5, 2025. Democratic hold.	▌ ✓ Stefano Famiglietti (Democratic) 83.0%; ▌Alex Asermely (Republican) 16.2%

=== South Carolina ===
District		Incumbent			This race	
Chamber	No.	Representative	Party	First elected	Results	Candidates
House	113	Marvin Pendarvis	Democratic	2017 (special)	Incumbent resigned September 16, 2024, after having his law license suspended. New member elected March 25, 2025. Democratic hold.	▌ ✓ Courtney Waters (Democratic) 98.0%; ▌Write-in 2.0%
House	50	Will Wheeler	Democratic	2017 (special)	Incumbent resigned January 17, 2025, to run for the South Carolina Circuit Court. New member elected June 3, 2025. Democratic hold.	▌ ✓ Keishan Scott (Democratic) 70.6%; ▌Bill Oden (Republican) 29.3%
House	21	Bobby Cox	Republican	2018	Incumbent resigned in January 2026 to run for State Senate. New member elected December 23, 2025. Republican hold.	▌ ✓ Dianne Mitchell (Republican) 70.3%; ▌Write-in 29.7%
House	88	RJ May	Republican	2020	Incumbent resigned August 11, 2025, after being indicted for possessing and distributing child sexual abuse material. New member elected December 23, 2025. Republican hold.	▌ ✓ John Thomas Lastinger (Republican) 62.3%; ▌Chuck Hightower (Democratic) 37.6%
Senate	12	Roger Nutt	Republican	2024	Incumbent resigned January 5, 2026, after being diagnosed with Alzheimer's disease. New member elected December 23, 2025. Republican hold.	▌ ✓ Lee Bright (Republican) 67.4%; ▌Write-in 32.6%

=== Utah (informal) ===
Utah does not normally conduct special elections to fill vacancies in its legislature. Rather, new members are selected by party delegates who live in the district where the vacancy occurred, and then they are appointed by the governor. Daniel Thatcher, who left the Republican Party to join the Forward Party earlier in the year, asked that his replacement be appointed using approval voting in an election open to all voters in the district. He set up a website and in-person voting locations for this to take place.

District		Incumbent			This race	
Chamber	No.	Representative	Party	First elected	Results	Candidates
Senate	11	Daniel Thatcher	Forward	2010	Incumbent resigned December 12, 2025. New member elected December 11, 2025. Forward hold.	▌ ✓ Emily Buss (Forward) 47.2%; ▌Maleah Bliss (Forward) 32.9%; ▌Tyley Bean (Forward) 32.2%; ▌Jeff Marshall (Forward) 31.6%; ▌Jeff Saunders (Forward) 30.4% (Note: Percentages do not sum to 100 due to the election's use of approval voting.)

=== Virginia ===
District		Incumbent			This race	
Chamber	No.	Representative	Party	First elected	Results	Candidates
House	26	Kannan Srinivasan	Democratic	2023	Incumbent resigned January 7, 2025, to run for State Senate. New member elected January 7, 2025. Democratic hold.	▌ ✓ JJ Singh (Democratic) 62.3%; ▌Ram Venkatachalam (Republican) 37.5%
Senate	10	John McGuire	Republican	2023	Incumbent resigned December 11, 2024, to become a U.S. representative. New member elected January 7, 2025. Republican hold.	▌ ✓ Luther Cifers (Republican) 57.8%; ▌Jack Trammell (Democratic) 42.1%
Senate	32	Suhas Subramanyam	Democratic	2023	Incumbent resigned November 11, 2024, to become a U.S. representative. New member elected January 7, 2025. Democratic hold.	▌ ✓ Kannan Srinivasan (Democratic) 61.7%; ▌Tumay Harding (Republican) 38.1%

=== Washington ===
District		Incumbent			This race	
Chamber	No.	Representative	Party	First elected	Results	Candidates
House	33 Position 1	Tina Orwall	Democratic	2008	Incumbent resigned December 10, 2024, after being appointed to the State Senate. Interim appointee elected November 4, 2025. (Note: Edwin Obras was appointed as interim representative by the King County Council on December 11, 2024.); Democratic hold.	▌ ✓ Edwin Obras (Democratic) 52.1%; ▌Kevin Schilling (Democratic) 46.4%; ▌Write-in 1.5%
House	34 Position 1	Emily Alvarado	Democratic	2022	Incumbent resigned January 21, 2025, after being appointed to the State Senate. Interim appointee elected November 4, 2025. (Note: Brianna Thomas was appointed as interim representative by the King County Council on January 21, 2025.); Democratic hold.	▌ ✓ Brianna Thomas (Democratic) 98.1%; ▌Write-in 1.9%
House	41 Position 1	Tana Senn	Democratic	2013 (appointed)	Incumbent resigned January 15, 2025, to lead the Washington Department of Children, Youth, and Families. Interim appointee elected November 4, 2025. (Note: Janice Zahn was appointed as interim representative by the King County Council on January 21, 2025.); Democratic hold.	▌ ✓ Janice Zahn (Democratic) 70.9%; ▌John Whitney (Republican) 29.0%
House	48 Position 1	Vandana Slatter	Democratic	2017 (appointed)	Incumbent resigned January 7, 2025, after being appointed to the State Senate. Interim appointee elected November 4, 2025. (Note: Osman Salahuddin was appointed as interim representative by the King County Council on January 7, 2025.); Democratic hold.	▌ ✓ Osman Salahuddin (Democratic) 70.1%; ▌Dennis Ellis (Republican) 29.8%
Senate	5	Bill Ramos	Democratic	2024	Incumbent died April 19, 2025. Interim appointee elected November 4, 2025. (Note: Victoria Hunt was appointed as interim senator by the King County Council on June 3, 2025.); Democratic hold.	▌ ✓ Victoria Hunt (Democratic) 56.3%; ▌Chad Magendanz (Republican) 43.6%
Senate	26	Emily Randall	Democratic	2018	Incumbent resigned December 8, 2024, to become a U.S. representative. Interim appointee elected November 4, 2025. (Note: Deborah Krishnadasan was appointed as interim senator by the Kitsap County Board of County Commissioners and Pierce County Council on December 11, 2024.); Democratic hold.	▌ ✓ Deborah Krishnadasan (Democratic) 52.5%; ▌Michelle Caldier (Republican) 47.4%
Senate	33	Karen Keiser	Democratic	2001 (appointed)	Incumbent resigned December 10, 2024. Interim appointee elected November 4, 2025. (Note: Tina Orwall was appointed as interim senator by the King County Council on December 11, 2024.); Democratic hold.	▌ ✓ Tina Orwall (Democratic) 96.8%; ▌Write-in 3.2%
Senate	34	Joe Nguyen	Democratic	2018	Incumbent resigned January 15, 2025, to lead the Washington State Department of Commerce. Interim appointee elected November 4, 2025. (Note: Emily Alvarado was appointed as interim senator by the King County Council on January 21, 2025.); Democratic hold.	▌ ✓ Emily Alvarado (Democratic) 98.1%; ▌Write-in 1.9%
Senate	48	Patty Kuderer	Democratic	2017 (appointed)	Incumbent resigned January 7, 2025 to become the Washington State Insurance Commissioner. Interim appointee elected November 4, 2025. (Note: Vandana Slatter was appointed as interim senator by the King County Council on January 7, 2025.); Democratic hold.	▌ ✓ Vandana Slatter (Democratic) 58.0%; ▌Amy Walen (Democratic) 40.7%; ▌Write-in 1.3%
