= 2025 Iowa elections =

Elections in Iowa, United States

In 2025, Iowa held elections for municipal governments, school boards, and to fill vacancies for various offices, including the Iowa General Assembly.

Under Iowa law, if a vacancy arises during the Iowa General Assembly's legislative session, the Governor of Iowa is required to call an election at the "earliest practical time" with at least eighteen days' notice.

== State legislative ==
=== Iowa Senate District 35 special election ===
2025 Iowa Senate District 35 special election
- January 28, 2025

Iowa Senate District 35
- Turnout: 21.3%
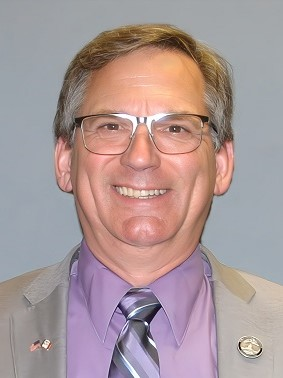

Nominee	Mike Zimmer	Katie Whittington
Party	Democratic	Republican
Popular vote	4,812	4,474
Percentage	51.71%	48.08%
- Zimmer: 40–50% 50–60% Whittington: 50–60% 60–70% 70–80%
Senator before election
Chris Cournoyer
Republican
Elected Senator
Mike Zimmer
Democratic

Incumbent Republican senator Chris Cournoyer was re-elected state senator in 2022 with 60.0 percent of the vote. She vacated the seat being appointed lieutenant governor in December 2024. Subsequently, a special election was held in the U.S. state of Iowa on January 28, 2025 to elect a new member for District 35 in the Iowa Senate, representing the counties of Clinton, Jackson, and Scott. Democratic candidate Mike Zimmer achieved an upset victory, flipping a district won by Republican nominee Donald Trump by 21 points in the 2024 presidential election.

==== Candidates ====
The following candidates were certified for the ballot:

- Katie Whittington, administrative assistant (Republican)
- Mike Zimmer, president of the Central DeWitt School Board (Democratic)

==== Results ====
2025 Iowa Senate District 35 special election
Party	Candidate	Votes	%	±%
Democratic	Mike Zimmer	4,812	51.71%	+12.75
Republican	Katie Whittington	4,474	48.08%	–11.68
Write-in		19	0.20%	+0.16
Total votes		9,305	100.00%	
Democratic gain from Republican				

=== Iowa House of Representatives District 100 special election ===
2025 House of Representatives District 100 special election
- March 11, 2025

Iowa House of Representatives District 100
- Turnout: 27.0%
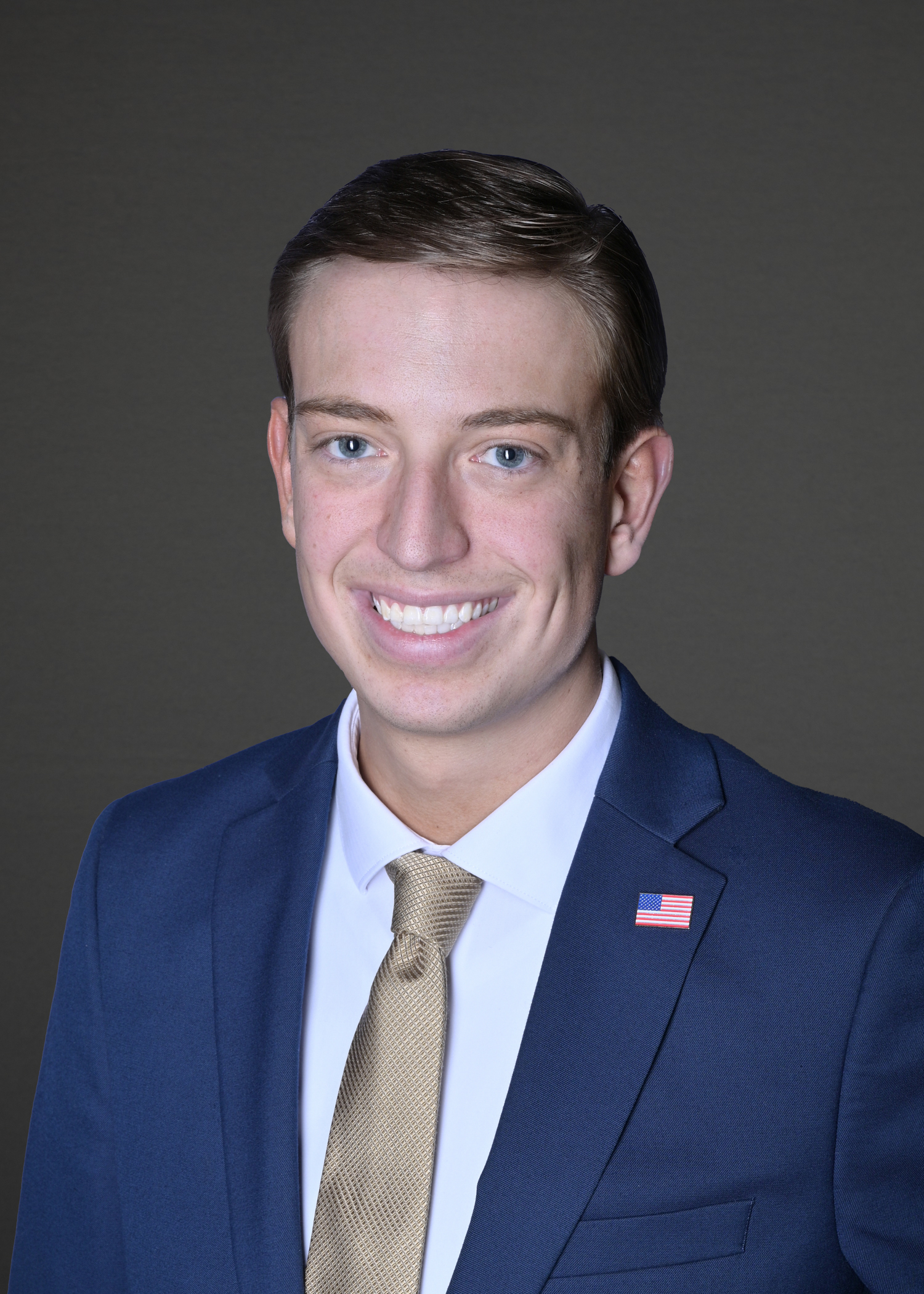

Nominee	Blaine Watkins	Nannette Griffin
Party	Republican	Democratic
Popular vote	2,749	2,574
Percentage	51.5%	48.2%
Representative before election
Martin Graber
Republican
Elected Representative
Blaine Watkins
Republican

Prior to his death, District 100 was represented by Martin Graber following redistricting in 2023. The last election he won was in 2024, when he defeated independent candidate Nicolas Atwood with 67.6% of the vote. Lee County is one of many "pivot counties", counties which twice voted for Barack Obama in 2008 and 2012, and subsequently swung to Donald Trump in 2016. Lee County has since voted again for Trump in 2020 and 2024. Subsequently, a special election was held in the U.S. state of Iowa on March 11, 2025 to elect a new member for District 100 in the Iowa House of Representatives, representing a large portion of Lee County. The election will fill a vacancy caused by the death of Republican member Martin Graber, who unexpectedly died on January 31, 2025.

==== Candidates ====
The parties nominated their candidates by convention. The Republican convention chose Blaine Watkins, a legislative aide. Watkins won with more than 70% of the vote at the Republican meeting. Other candidates at the convention included Daniel Atwood, a platoon leader in the Iowa National Guard, Tracy Gach, a high school teacher and businessman, and Larry Kruse, a former Lee County supervisor.

The Democratic convention selected Nannette Griffin, a businesswoman and nominee for the 50th Senate District in 2024.

==== Results ====
2025 Iowa House of Representatives District 100 special election
Party	Candidate	Votes	%	±%
Republican	Blaine Watkins	2,749	51.52	−16.09
Democratic	Nannette Griffin	2,574	48.24	+48.24
Write-in		13	0.24	-0.09
Total votes		5,336	100.00	
Republican hold		Swing	-16.09	

=== Iowa House of Representatives District 78 special election ===
2025 Iowa House of Representatives District 78 special election
- April 29, 2025

Iowa House of Representatives District 78
- Turnout: 17.4%
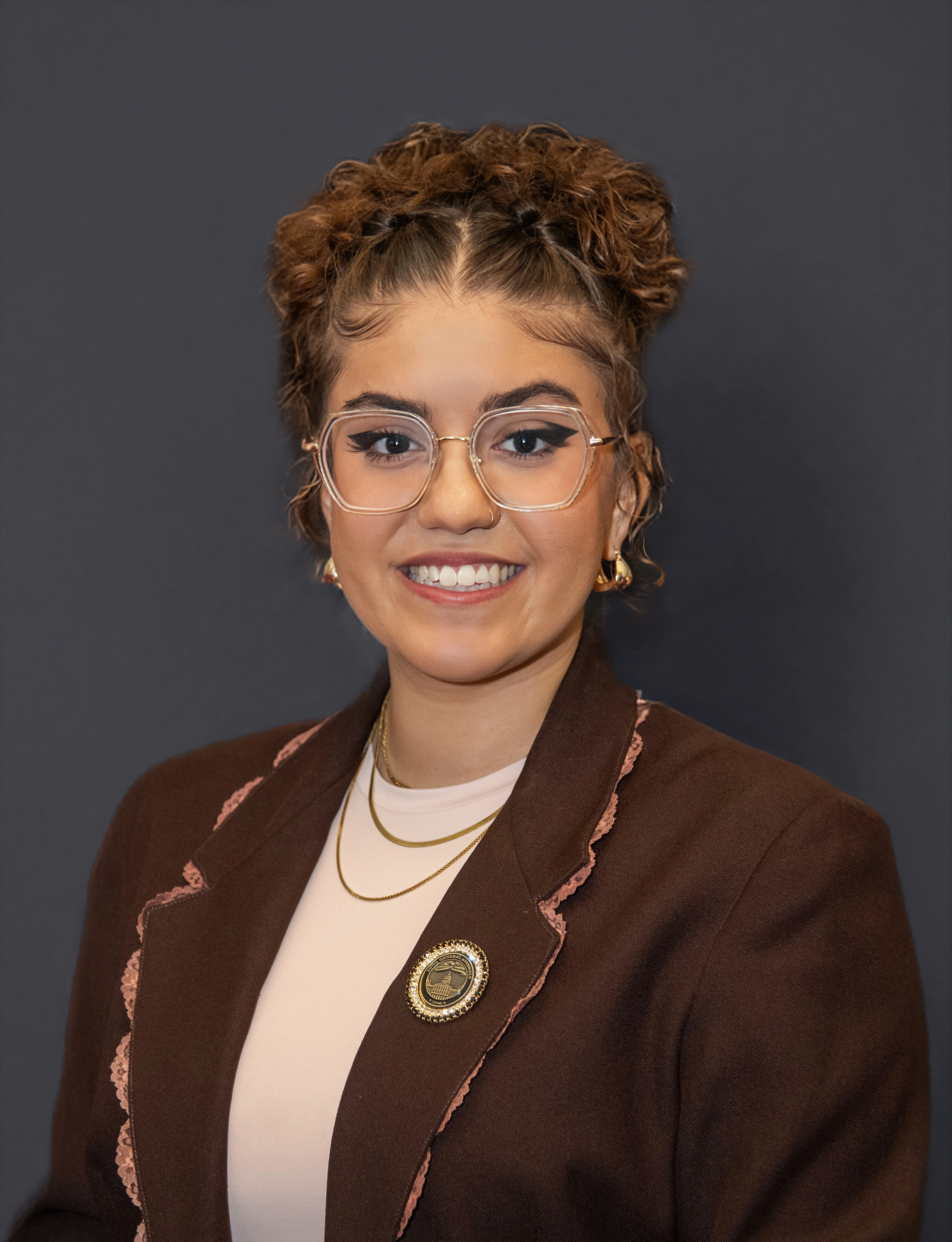

Candidate	Angel Ramirez	Bernie Hayes
Party	Democratic	Republican
Popular vote	2,747	721
Percentage	79.07%	20.75%
- Precinct results Ramirez: 60–70% 70–80% 80–90%
Representative before election
Sami Scheetz
Democratic
Elected Representative
Angel Ramirez
Democratic

A special election in the U.S. state of Iowa was held on April 29, 2025, to elect a new member to the Iowa House of Representatives to represent District 78. The special election was called after the resignation of Democratic incumbent Sami Scheetz following his appointment to the Linn County Board of Supervisors. District 78 is located entirely within Linn County, representing a portion of Cedar Rapids.

On April 8, 2025, governor Kim Reynolds issued the writs of election, scheduling the special election for April 29. Candidates had until April 15 to file for election. No primaries are held for state legislative special elections in Iowa, so political parties must nominate candidates by convention. Independent candidates may petition to be placed on the ballot by collecting signatures.

==== Previous results (2022–present) ====
Results before the 2020 redistricting cycle are not included as the current 78th district does not contain any of the old 78th district.

Year	Democrats			Republicans			Other		Mgn.	Ref.
2024 pres.	Kamala Harris	9,577	65.20%	Donald Trump	4,798	32.67%	313	2.13%	D+32.53	
2024	Sami Scheetz (i)	10,803	96.73%				365	3.27%	D+93.46	
2022	Sami Scheetz	7,239	67.46%	Anne Fairchild	3,466	32.30%	26	0.24%	D+35.16	

==== Candidates ====
- Bernie Hayes, retired engineer, nominee for Iowa Senate District 33 in 2018, nominee for Iowa Senate District 39 in 2022 (Republican)
- Angel Ramirez, activist (Democratic)

==== Results ====
Decision Desk HQ called the election for Democrat Angel Ramirez after all precincts reported.

2025 Iowa House of Representatives District 78 special election
Party	Candidate	Votes	%	±%
Democratic	Angel Ramirez	2,742	79.07%	–17.66
Republican	Bernie Hayes	721	20.75%	New
Write-in		6	0.17%	−1.96
Total votes		3,474	100.00	
Democratic hold		Swing	–17.69	

=== Iowa Senate District 1 special election ===
2025 Iowa Senate District 1 special election
- August 26, 2025

Iowa Senate District 1
- Turnout: 24.0%
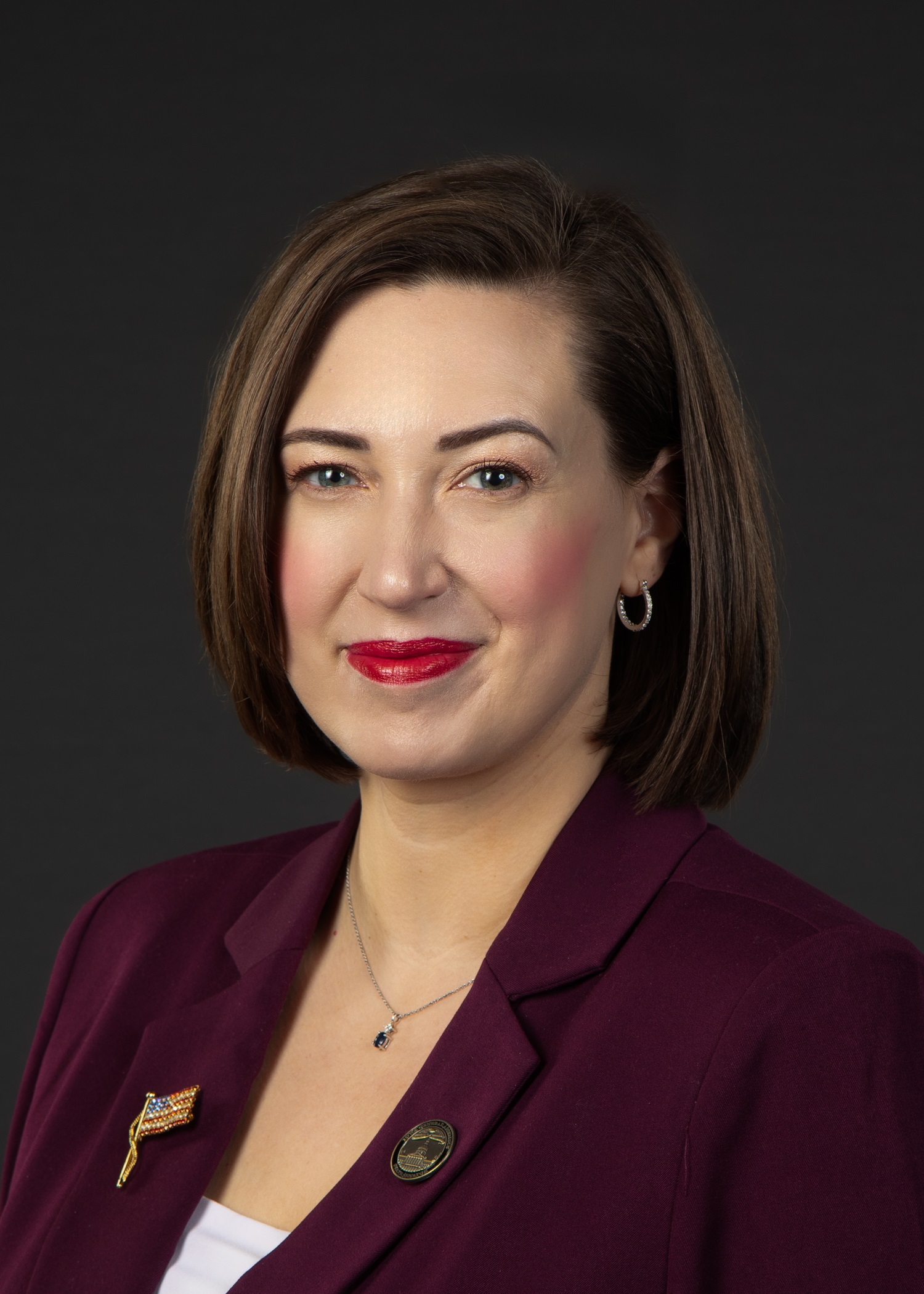

Candidate	Catelin Drey	Cristopher Prosch
Party	Democratic	Republican
Popular vote	4,212	3,412
Percentage	55.21%	44.72%
- Precinct results Drey: 50–60% 60–70% 70–80% Prosch: 50–60% 70–80%
Representative before election
Rocky De Witt
Republican
Elected Representative
Catelin Drey
Democratic

Rocky De Witt, the Republican incumbent senator from Iowa's 1st Senate district died of pancreatic cancer on June 25, 2025. The election took place on August 26, 2025. The Democratic Party nominated Catelin Drey. The Republican Party nominated Christopher Prosch. Drey won the election by 10 points, flipping the seat and ending the Republicans' supermajority in the Iowa Senate.

==== Results ====
2025 Iowa Senate District 1 special election
Party	Candidate	Votes	%	±%
Democratic	Catelin Drey	4,212	55.21%	+10.48
Republican	Christopher Prosch	3,412	44.72%	–10.33
Write-in		5	0.07%	–0.15
Total votes		7,629	100.00	
Democratic gain from Republican				

=== Iowa House of Representatives District 7 special election ===
2025 House of Representatives District 7 special election
- December 9, 2025

Iowa House of Representatives District 7
- Turnout: 18.9%
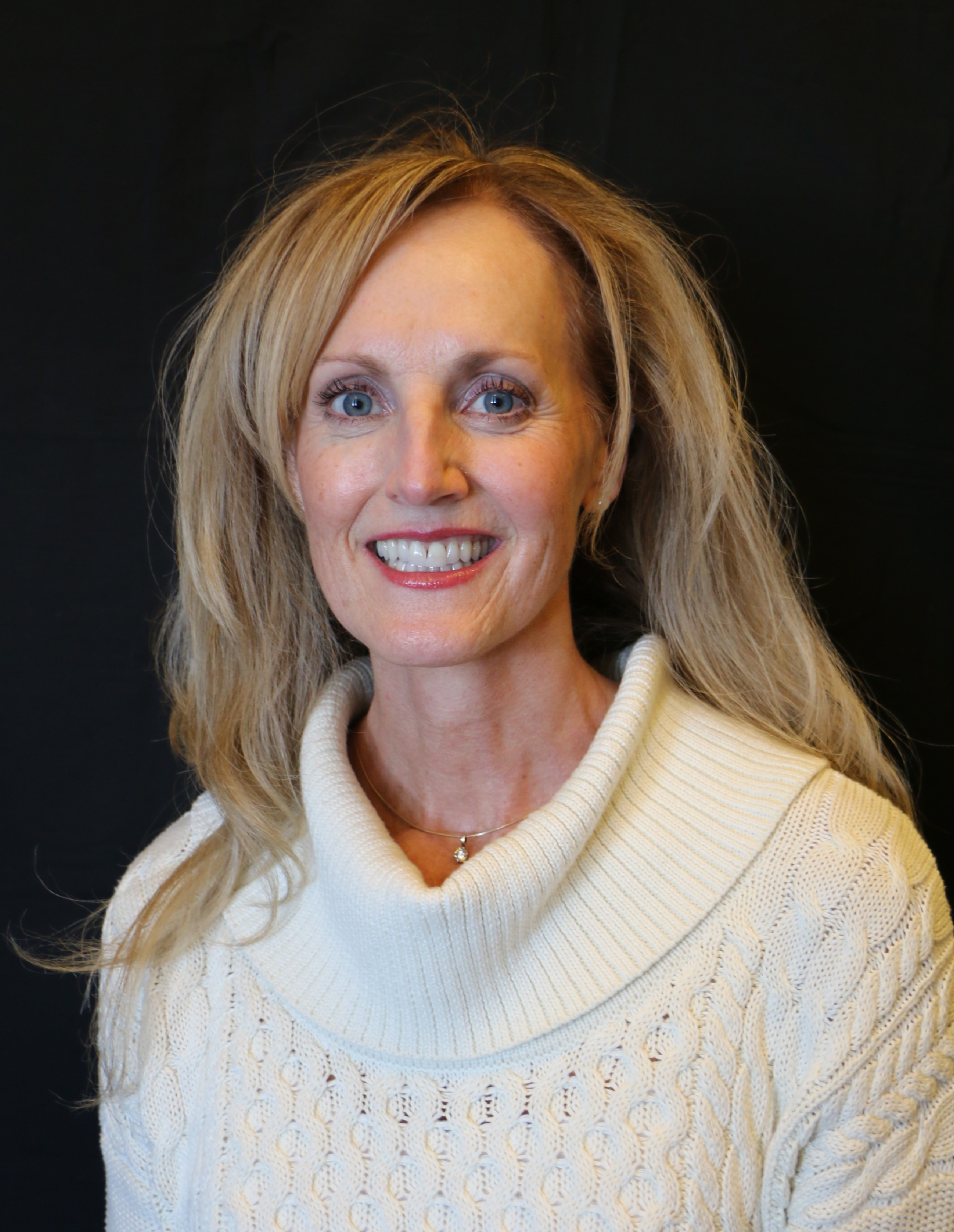
Candidate	Wendy Larson	Rachel Burns
Party	Republican	Democratic
Popular vote	2,818	1,201
Percentage	70.03%	29.85%
Representative before election
Mike Sexton
Republican
Elected Representative
Wendy Larson
Republican

Mike Sexton, the Republican incumbent senator from Iowa's 7th House of Representatives district resigned September 19, 2025, after being appointed Iowa state director for USDA Rural Development. The election took place on December 9, 2025. The Democratic Party nominated Rachel Burns. The Republican Party nominated Wendy Larson. Larson won the election by 40 points, less than 51 point margin by Republican nominee Donald Trump in the 2024 presidential election.

==== Results ====
2025 House of Representatives District 7 special election
Party	Candidate	Votes	%	±%
Republican	Wendy Larson	2,818	70.03%	–13.40
Democratic	Rachel Burns	1,201	29.85%	New
Write-in		5	0.12%	–0.31
Total votes		4,023	100.00	
Republican hold				

Results by County
County	Wendy Larson		Rachel Burns		Write-In		Margin		Total votes cast
County	#	%	#	%	#	%	#	%	Total votes cast
Calhoun	786	69.25%	344	30.31%	5	0.44%	442	38.94%	1,135
Pocahontas	543	70.89%	223	29.11%	0	0.00%	320	41.78%	766
Sac	1,224	72.00%	476	28.00%	0	0.00%	748	44.00%	1,700
Webster	265	62.65%	158	37.35%	0	0.00%	107	25.30%	423
Totals	2,818	70.03%	1,201	29.85%	5	0.12%	1,617	40.18%	4,024

=== Iowa Senate District 16 special election ===
2025 Iowa Senate District 16 special election
- December 30, 2025

Iowa Senate District 16
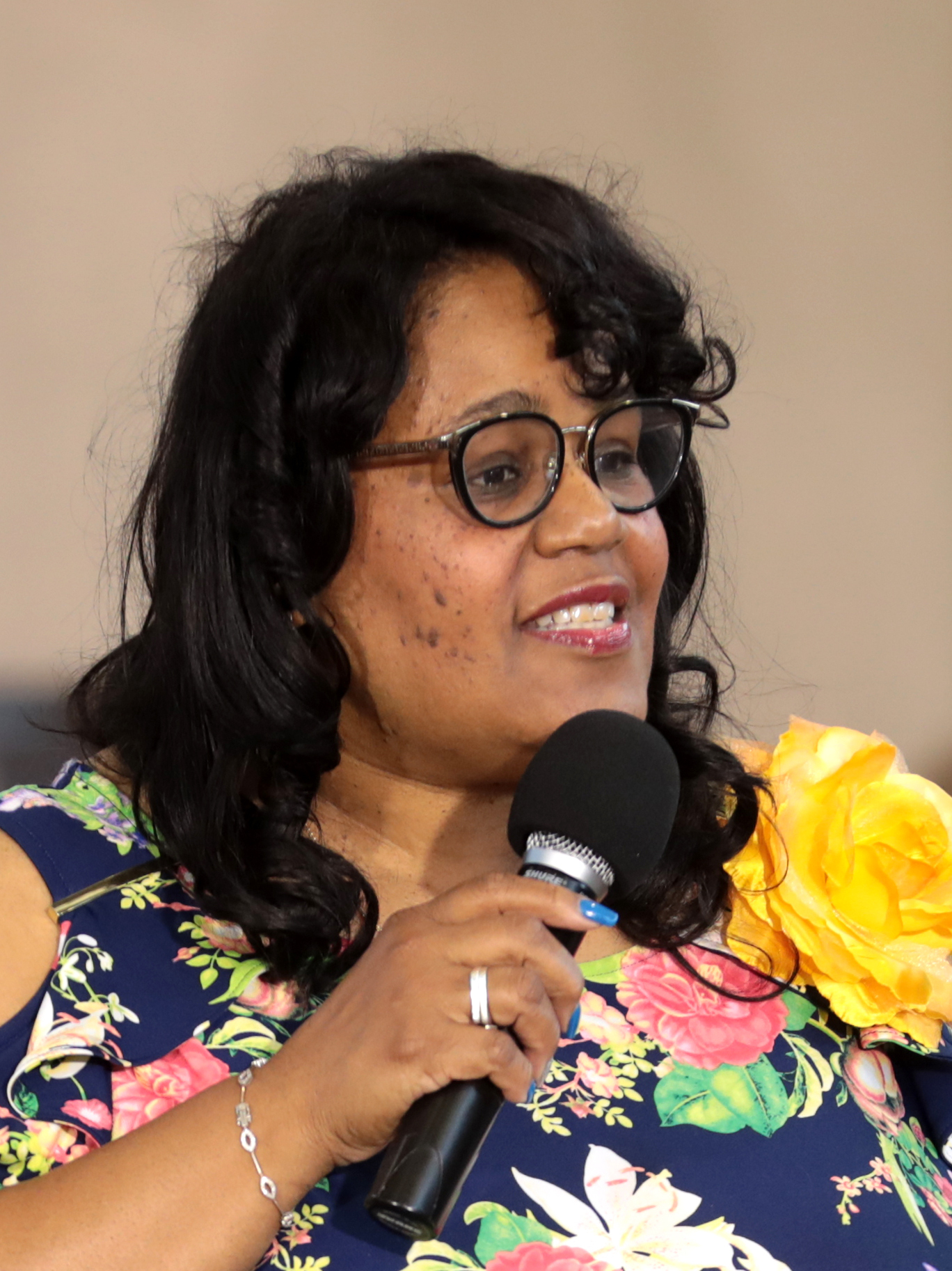

Nominee	Renee Hardman	Lucas Loftin
Party	Democratic	Republican
Popular vote	7,341	2,930
Percentage	71.40%	28.50%
Senator before election
Claire Celsi
Democratic
Elected Senator
Renee Hardman
Democratic

Incumbent Democratic senator Claire Celsi was re-elected state senator in 2024 with 69.5 percent of the vote. She died on October 6, 2025. Subsequently, a special election will be held on December 30, 2025 to elect a new member for District 35 in the Iowa Senate, representing part of Dallas and Polk counties. Democrats nominated Renee Hardman while Republicans nominated Lucas Lifton. Hardman won the election by 43 points, more than 17 point margin by Democratic nominee Kamala Harris in the 2024 presidential election.

==== Candidates ====
- Renee Hardman, CEO of Lutheran Services in Iowa and West Des Moines city councilmember (Democratic)
- Lucas Loftin, software manager (Republican)

==== Results ====
2025 Iowa Senate District 16 special election
Party	Candidate	Votes	%	±%
Democratic	Renee Hardman	7,341	71.40%	+1.94%
Republican	Lucas Lifton	2,930	28.50%	New
Write-in		11	0.11%	–0.84
Total votes		10,282	100.00%	
Democratic hold				

Results by County
County	Renee Hardman		Lucas Lifton		Write-In		Margin		Total votes cast
County	#	%	#	%	#	%	#	%	Total votes cast
Dallas	114	67.46%	55	32.54%	0	0.00%	59	28.52%	169
Polk	7,227	71.46%	2,875	28.43%	11	0.11%	4,352	43.03%	10,113
Totals	7,341	71.40%	2,930	28.50%	11	0.11%	4,411	42.90%	10,282

== Local elections ==
The filing period for municipal offices is August 11, 2025, to August 28, 2025 for cities with primary elections. Such primary elections will be held October 7, 2025. All other cities and school boards have a filing period of August 25, 2025, to September 18, 2025. The regularly scheduled election will be November 4, 2025. In the event a municipal election requires a runoff, the runoff will be held on December 2, 2025.

== See also ==
- 2025 United States state legislative special elections
