= 2025 South Carolina elections =

Elections in the U.S. state of South Carolina

Elections were held in the U.S. State of South Carolina throughout 2025 to elect municipal positions, as well as any special elections.

== State legislative ==
=== House District 113 ===
2025 South Carolina House of Representatives District 113 special election
- March 25, 2025
- Turnout: 1.94% (unofficial)
| Candidate | Courtney Waters | Write-in |
| Party | Democratic |
| Popular vote | 389 | 8 |
| Percentage | 97.98% | 2.02% |
Representative before election
Marvin R. Pendarvis
Democratic
Elected Representative
Courtney Waters
Democratic

The 2025 South Carolina House of Representatives District 113 special election was held on March 25, 2025, to elect a member of the South Carolina House of Representatives from the 113th district. The primary election was held on January 21, 2025.

==== Background ====
Incumbent representative Marvin R. Pendarvis resigned following a malpractice investigation and the suspension of his law license.

==== Democratic primary ====
===== Candidates =====
====== Nominee ======
- Courtney Waters, nonprofit director

====== Eliminated in primary ======
- Michelle Brandt, environmental scientist
- Kim Clark, realtor

===== Results =====
Results by precinct Waters: 90–100%; 80–90%; 70–80%; 60–70%; 50–60%; Brandt: 90–100%; 60–70%; No votes

Democratic primary
| Party | Candidate | Votes | % |
|---|---|---|---|
| Democratic | Courtney Waters | 561 | 69.86 |
| Democratic | Michelle Brandt | 228 | 28.39 |
| Democratic | Kim Clark | 14 | 1.74 |
| Total votes | | 803 | 100.00 |

==== General election ====
2025 South Carolina House of Representatives District 113 special election
| Party | Candidate | Votes | % |
|---|---|---|---|
| Democratic | Courtney Waters | 389 | 97.98 |
| Write-in | | 8 | 2.02 |
| Total votes | | 396 | 100.00 |

=== House District 50 ===
2025 South Carolina House of Representatives District 50 special election
- June 3, 2025
- Turnout: 14.31%
| Candidate | Keishan Scott | William Oden |
| Party | Democratic | Republican |
| Popular vote | 2,593 | 1,078 |
| Percentage | 70.6% | 29.4% |
- Precinct results (with counties labeled); Scott: 50–60% 60–70% 70–80% 80–90% 90–100% Oden: 50–60% 60–70% 70–80% Tie No votes
Representative before election
Will Wheeler
Democratic
Elected Representative
Keishan Scott
Democratic

A special election was held in the U.S. state of South Carolina on June 3, 2025, to elect a new member for District 50 in the South Carolina House of Representatives, representing portions of three counties in central South Carolina. The election filled a vacancy caused by the resignation of Democratic member Will Wheeler in January 2025.

==== Background ====
Race of registered voters in House District 50 as of May 20, 2025, per the South Carolina Election Commission
1. White (47.1%)
2. Black (50.5%)
3. All others (2.40%)

After the 2024 general election, Republicans held a supermajority in the South Carolina House of Representatives, outnumbering Democrats 88 to 36.

The special election was made necessary by the resignation of incumbent Democratic representative Will Wheeler on January 16, 2025, to become eligible for a judicial seat in the 12th Circuit Court in 2026. Under South Carolina, judicial candidates must be out of the legislature at least a year out from the election.

The general election is scheduled for June 3, 2025. A primary was held on April 1, 2025, with a runoff primary election additionally scheduled for April 15, 2025, but was not necessary.

As of May 20, 2025, there were 25,815 registered voters in HD 50. It is majority-minority, with 51% of the district's registered voters being Black.

===== Previous general election results =====
This table shows every general election in HD 50 won by the previous incumbent, Democrat Will Wheeler, and the election immediately preceding. Until this special election, Republicans had only contested this seat one time since 2014. Wheeler had not faced any primary opposition from any fellow Democrats since 2016.

| Year | Democrats | | | Republican | | | Write-in | | Mgn. | Ref. |
|---|---|---|---|---|---|---|---|---|---|---|
| 2024 | Will Wheeler (i) | 13,512 | 98.12% | | | | 259 | 1.88% | D+96.24 | |
| 2022 | Will Wheeler (i) | 7,815 | 59.98% | Marvin Jones | 5,201 | 39.92% | 13 | 0.10% | D+20.06 | |
| 2020 | Will Wheeler (i) | 12,628 | 97.36% | | | | 343 | 2.64% | D+94.72 | |
| 2018 | Will Wheeler (i) | 9,139 | 98.51% | | | | 138 | 1.49% | D+97.02 | |
| 2016 | Will Wheeler (i) | 11,983 | 99.43% | | | | 69 | 0.57% | D+98.86 | |
| 2014 | Grady Brown (i) | 8,574 | 98.53% | | | | 128 | 1.47% | D+97.06 | |

==== Democratic primary ====
===== Candidates =====
====== Nominee ======
- Keishan Scott, Bishopville city councilor

====== Eliminated in primary ======
- Carl Whetsel, former Bishopville city councilor and businessman

===== Results =====
Democratic primary precinct results: Scott: 50–60% 60–70% 70–80% 80–90% 90–100% / Whetsel: 50–60% 60–70% 70–80% 80–90% No votes Tie

Unofficial vote tallies saw Scott leading Whetsel 1,435–1,425. Due to the tight margin, the election was subject to an automatic recount. The recount expanded Scott's unofficial 10-vote lead by one.

Keishan Scott won a majority of votes cast in Kershaw County and Sumter County, while Whetsel won Lee County.

2025 South Carolina House of Representatives District 50 special Democratic primary April 1, 2025
| Party | Candidate | Votes | % |
|---|---|---|---|
| Democratic | Keishan Scott | 1,436 | 50.19% |
| Democratic | Carl Whetsel | 1,425 | 49.81% |
| Total votes | | 2,861 | 100.00% |
| Turnout | | 2,877 | 11.14% |
| Registered electors | | 25,818 | |

==== Republican nominee ====
The Republican primary was canceled as only one candidate, former U.S. Air Force colonel William Oden, filed to run.

==== General election ====
===== Results =====
2025 South Carolina House of Representatives District 50 special election June 3, 2025 (election night results)
| Party | Candidate | Votes | % |
|---|---|---|---|
| Democratic | Keishan Scott | 2,593 | 70.56% |
| Republican | William Oden | 1,078 | 29.33% |
| Write-in | | 4 | 0.11% |
| Total votes | | 3,675 | 100.0 |
| Registered electors | | 25,816 | |
| Turnout | | | 14.31% |
| Democratic hold | | | |
