= Senator Hardman =

Senator Hardman may refer to:

- Lamartine Griffin Hardman (1856–1937), Georgia State Senate
- Renee Hardman (born 1960/61), Iowa State Senate

== See also ==
- Bill Hardiman (fl. 1990s–2010s), Michigan State Senate
