= Iowa's 7th House of Representatives district =

American legislative district

House District 7
- Type: District of the Lower house
- Location: Iowa
- Representative-elect: Wendy Larson
- Parent organization: Iowa General Assembly

The 7th District of the Iowa House of Representatives in the state of Iowa. It is currently composed of Pocahontas, Sac, and Calhoun counties, as well as part of Webster County.

== Current elected officials ==
Wendy Larson currently serves this district, having won a special election in December 2025 after the resignation of Mike Sexton.

== Past representatives ==
The district has previously been represented by:

- Quentin V. Anderson, 1963–1967
- Kenneth L. Logemann, 1971–1973
- Robert A. Krause, 1973–1979
- Sue Mullins, 1979–1983
- Lester Menke, 1983–1985
- Thomas H. Miller, 1985–1993
- John M. Greig, 1993–1999
- Greg Stevens, 1999–2003
- Marcella Frevert, 2003–2011
- John Wittneben, 2011–2013
- Tedd Gassman, 2013–2021
- Henry Stone, 2021–2023
- Mike Sexton, 2023–2025
- Wendy Larson, 2026–Present
