= Kenneth L. Logemann =

American politician (1937–2013)

Kenneth LaVern Logemann (July 11, 1937 – March 4, 2013) was an American politician.

== Early life ==
Logemann was born to parents J. Barney Logemann and Martha Aurdal in Albert Lea, Minnesota, on July 11, 1937. The family moved to Worth County, Iowa, where Logemann attended the Deer Creek #3 Grade School, a rural country school in Deer Creek Township, and graduated from Northwood High School in 1955. While a student of Iowa State University, Logemann joined the Reserve Officers' Training Corps. He served in the United States Army from 1958 to 1960, then worked on his family farm.

== Political career ==
Logemann served in the Iowa House of Representatives as a Republican. He held the District 94 seat from January 6, 1970 to January 10, 1971. He was then reelected to District 7 from January 11, 1971 to January 7, 1973. After stepping down as a state legislator, Logemann was a manager of Chuck Grassley's field office, and later directed Ronald Reagan's presidential campaigns in Iowa.

== Personal life ==
Logemann married Rebecca Buenneke on May 26, 1962. The couple lived in Carpenter and raised two daughters, Rhonda and Renae. He attended the Deer Creek Valley Lutheran Church as a child and later the First Lutheran Church, where he served as a Sunday school teacher and on the church council. Logemann died at a nursing home in Manly on March 4, 2013, aged 75.

Iowa House of Representatives
Preceded by James T. Klein	Member of the Iowa House of Representatives from the 94th district January 6, 1970–January 10, 1971	Succeeded by Thomas M. Dougherty
Preceded by Eldon Stroburg	Member of the Iowa House of Representatives from the 7th district January 11, 1971–January 7, 1973	Succeeded by Bob Krause
