= 2025 Mississippi House of Representatives special election =

- April 22 – November 4, 2025

8 of 122 seats in the Mississippi House of Representatives 62 seats needed for a majority
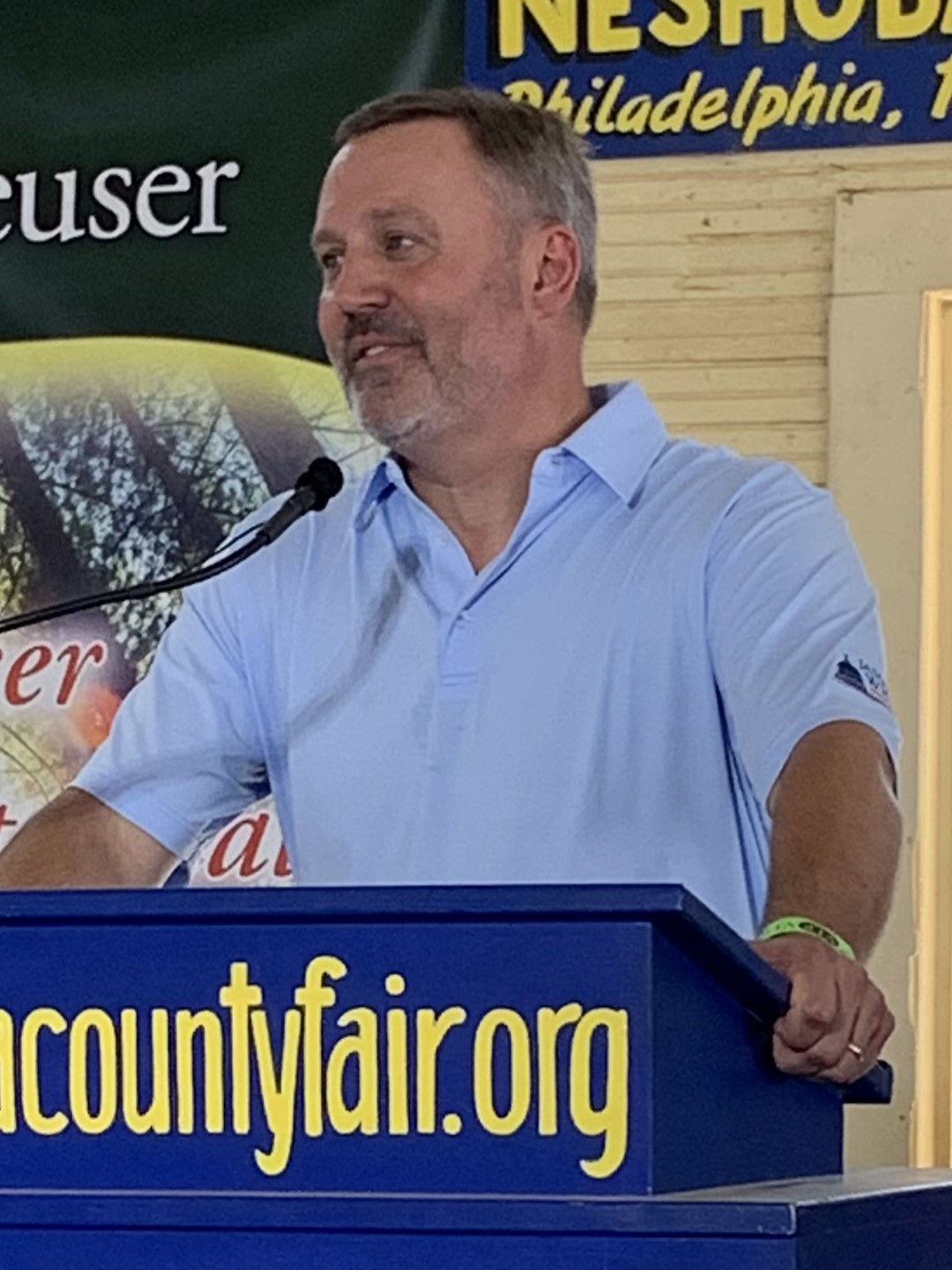

	Majority party	Minority party	Third party
Leader	Jason White	Robert Johnson III
Party	Republican	Democratic	Independents
Leader since	January 2, 2024	January 7, 2020	N/A
Leader's seat	48th district	94th district	N/A
Seats before	79	41	2
Seats won	78	42	2
Swing	▼1	▲1	Steady
Speaker before election
Jason White
Republican
Elected Speaker
Jason White
Republican

The 2025 Mississippi House of Representatives special election was held on November 4, 2025, to elect 5 of 122 members of the Mississippi House of Representatives. Special elections were called in 5 districts due to court-ordered redistricting, in addition to special elections held on April 22 to fill vacancies in two districts. Primary elections were held on August 5, and runoff elections were canceled as all elections resulted in majority wins.

== Background ==
The election was called after court-ordered redistricting caused the state House map to be redrawn, as it was found to diminish the voting power of the state's African American population. The new map creates one new majority black district in Chickasaw County.

== Summary ==
=== April 22 special elections ===
District	Incumbent			Result	Candidates
District	Member	Party	First elected	Result	Candidates
23	Andy Stepp	Republican	2023	Incumbent died December 5, 2024. New member elected April 22, 2025 after no one received over 50% of the vote on March 25, 2025. Republican hold.	First round: ▌ Perry Van Bailey (Nonpartisan) 40.8%; ▌ Colby Bollinger (Nonpartisan) 32.2%; ▌Travis Wright (Nonpartisan) 20.0%; ▌Andy Clark (Nonpartisan) 6.0%; ▌Danny Lampley (Nonpartisan) 1.0%; Runoff: ▌ ✓ Perry Van Bailey (Nonpartisan) 50.6%; ▌Colby Bollinger (Nonpartisan) 49.4%
82	Charles Young Jr.	Democratic	2011	Incumbent died December 19, 2024. New member elected April 22, 2025 after no one received over 50% of the vote on March 25, 2025. Democratic hold.	First round: ▌ Gregory Elliott (Nonpartisan) 40.3%; ▌ Joe Norwood (Nonpartisan) 30.0%; ▌Joseph Denson (Nonpartisan) 29.7%; Runoff: ▌ ✓ Gregory Elliott (Nonpartisan) 65.5%; ▌Joe Norwood (Nonpartisan) 34.5%

=== November 4 special election ===
District	Incumbent			Result	Candidates
District	Member	Party	First elected	Result	Candidates
26	Orlando Paden	Democratic	2015	Incumbent resigned June 30, 2025 to become the Mayor of Clarksdale. New member elected November 4, 2025. Democratic hold.	▌ ✓ Otha Williams (Nonpartisan) 52.6%; ▌Kim Seals (Nonpartisan) 33.8%; ▌Mary Dear-Moton (Nonpartisan) 13.6%

=== November 4 redistricting elections ===
District	Incumbent				Candidates	Result
District	Member	Party	First elected	Running	Candidates	Result
16	Rickey Thompson	Democratic	2019	Yes	▌ ✓ Rickey Thompson (Democratic)	Democratic hold.
22	Jon Ray Lancaster	Republican	2019	Yes	▌ ✓ Justin Crosby (Democratic) 52.8%; ▌Jon Ray Lancaster (Republican) 47.2%	Democratic gain.
36	Karl Gibbs	Democratic	2013 (special)	Yes	▌ ✓ Karl Gibbs (Democratic)	Democratic hold.
39	Dana McLean	Republican	2019	Yes	▌ ✓ Dana McLean (Republican)	Republican hold.
41	Kabir Karriem	Democratic	2015	Yes	▌ ✓ Kabir Karriem (Democratic)	Democratic hold.

== See also ==
- 2025 United States state legislative elections
