= Tedd Gassman =

American politician (born 1943)

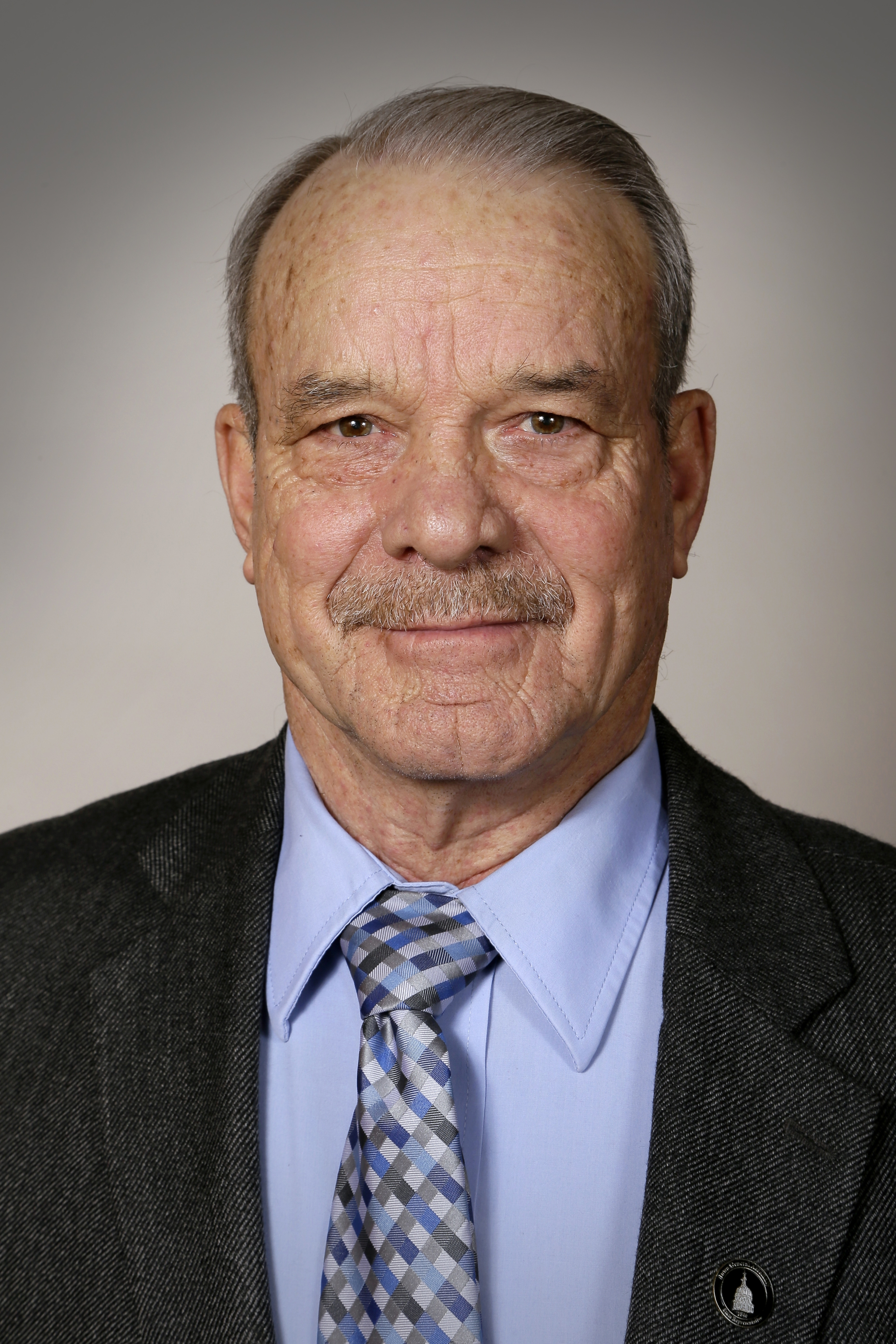
- 86th General Assembly portrait (2015)

Member of the Iowa House of Representatives from the 7th district
- In office January 14, 2013 – January 10, 2021
- Preceded by: John Wittneben
- Succeeded by: Henry Stone

Personal details
- Born: March 6, 1943 (age 83) Valentine, Nebraska, U.S.
- Party: Republican
- Website: legis.iowa.gov/...

Tedd Gassman (born March 6, 1943) is an American politician who represented the seventh district of the Iowa House of Representatives from 2013 to 2021.

As of January 2013, Gassman serves on several committees in the Iowa House – the Education, Environmental Protection, Judiciary, and Local Government committees. He also serves as the vice chair of the Administration and Regulation Appropriations Subcommittee.

== Electoral history ==
*Incumbent

Election	Political result	Candidate	Party	Votes	%
Iowa House of Representatives primary elections, 2012; District 7 Turnout: 2,479	Republican	Tedd Gassman	Republican	1,302	52.52%
Iowa House of Representatives primary elections, 2012; District 7 Turnout: 2,479	Republican	Mark Frakes	Republican	1,018	41.06%
Iowa House of Representatives general elections, 2012; District 7 Turnout: 15,988	Republican (newly redistricted)	Ted Gassman	Republican	7,669	47.97%
Iowa House of Representatives general elections, 2012; District 7 Turnout: 15,988	Republican (newly redistricted)	John Wittneben*	Democratic	7,625	47.69%

Iowa House of Representatives
Preceded by John Wittneben	7th District; 2013–2021	Succeeded by Henry Stone
