= Justin Crosby =

American politician

Member of the Mississippi House of Representatives from the 22nd district
- Incumbent
- Assumed office January 6, 2026
- Preceded by: Jon Ray Lancaster

Personal details
- Born: Aberdeen, Mississippi
- Party: Democratic
- Education: Delta State University; University of Mississippi
- Website: www.crosbyfor22.com

Justin Crosby is an American politician who was elected as a member of the Mississippi House of Representatives in 2025. A member of the Democratic Party, he defeated incumbent Republican Jon Ray Lancaster. Crosby graduated from Itawamba Community College, Delta State University and the University of Mississippi.
