= Jon Ray Lancaster =

American politician

Member of the Mississippi House of Representatives from the 22nd district
- In office January 7, 2020 – January 6, 2026
- Preceded by: Preston E. Sullivan
- Succeeded by: Justin Crosby

Personal details
- Born: Amory, Mississippi, U.S.
- Party: Republican (since 2021)
- Other political affiliations: Democratic (until 2021)

Johnathan Ray Lancaster is an American politician who served in the Mississippi House of Representatives, having first been elected in 2019 as a Democrat and later defecting to the Republican Party. He was defeated in a 2025 special election.

== Biography ==
Jonathan Ray Lancaster was born in Amory, Mississippi. He has graduated from Houston High School. In 2019, he was elected to represent Mississippi's 22nd House district as a Democrat in the Mississippi House of Representatives for the 2020–2024 term. He was inaugurated on January 7, 2020. Lancaster switched from the Democratic to the Republican Party in November 2021.

Lancaster lost his seat in a 2025 special election to Democrat Justin Crosby. The election was held after due to court-ordered redistricting, with the previous electoral boundaries found to have diminished the voting power of the state's African American population.
