= Gregory Elliott =

Mississippi politician

Member of the Mississippi House of Representatives from the 82nd district
- Incumbent
- Assumed office April 22, 2025
- Preceded by: Charles Young Jr.

Personal details
- Political party: Democratic Party (Note: Mississippi law requires candidates running in special elections to run as unaffiliated, or without a party. He is listed as a Democrat.)
- Education: Jackson State University

Gregory Elliott is an American politician who is a Democratic member of the Mississippi House of Representatives, representing the 82nd district. He was first elected in a special election on April 22, 2025 to succeed Democratic representative Charles Young Jr., who died in office. The district is based in Lauderdale County and is centered around the city of Meridian.

== Personal life and career ==
Elliott is a lifelong resident of Meridian. He graduated from Jackson State University. He previously served on the Meridian Civil Service Commission for Ward 4.

== Political positions ==
=== Department of Education ===
Elliott opposes cuts to and the dismantling of the Department of Education.

== Electoral history ==
2025 Mississippi State House special election runoff, District 82
| Party | Candidate | Votes | % |
|---|---|---|---|
| Unaffiliated | Gregory Elliott | 805 | 65.5 |
| Unaffiliated | Joseph Norwood | 424 | 34.5 |
| Total votes | | 1,229 | 100 |

2025 Mississippi State House special election, District 82 (Round 1)
| Party | Candidate | Votes | % |
|---|---|---|---|
| Unaffiliated | Gregory Elliott | 556 | 40.32 |
| Unaffiliated | Joseph Norwood | 413 | 29.95 |
| Unaffiliated | Joseph A. Denson | 410 | 29.73 |
| Total votes | | 1,379 | 100 |
