= Blaine Watkins =

American politician from Iowa

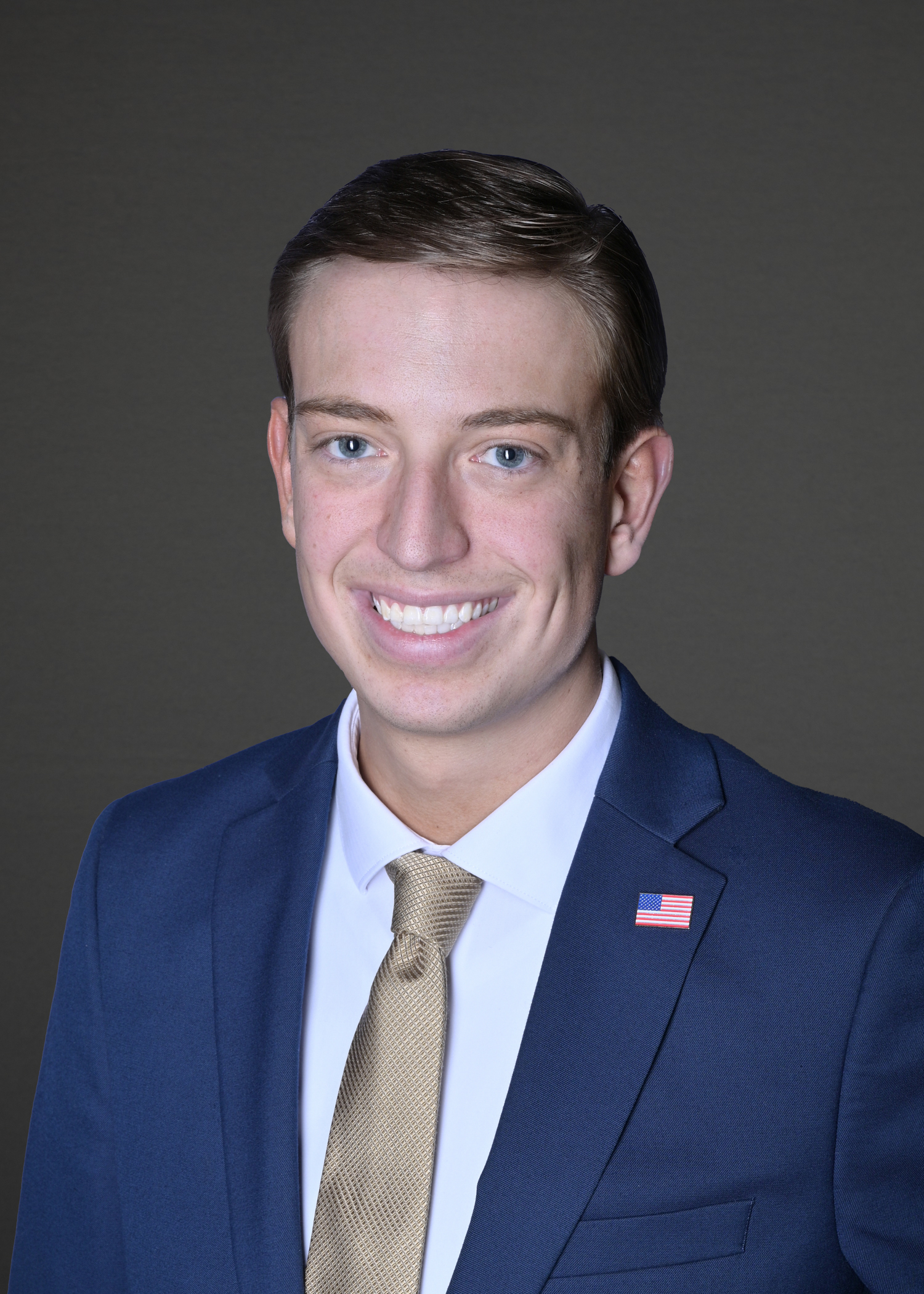
- Official portrait, 2025

Member of the Iowa House of Representatives from the 100th district
- Incumbent
- Assumed office March 11, 2025
- Preceded by: Martin Graber

Personal details
- Born: June 26, 2001 (age 25) Iowa City, Iowa, U.S.
- Party: Republican
- Education: Grand View University
- Website: blainewatkinsforiowa.com

Blaine Watkins (born June 26, 2001) is an American politician currently serving as member of the Iowa House of Representatives for the 100th district. He was elected in a special election.

Watkins was a legislative clerk and is a farmer.

== 2025 Special Election ==
During the Iowa house representative special election in 2025, Watkins was notably funded by the Republican Party of Iowa ($73,000), the Koch-funded Americans for Prosperity Organization ($69,000), and the socially conservative group, The FAMiLY Leader. ($10,500). In total, Watkins was provided over $150,000 in financial support for this election. The support of these organizations was noted on Watkin's candidate website (blainwatkinsforiowa.com), which has been taken down since the election.

In contrast, Democratic candidate Nanette Griffin received just over $36,000 from the Iowa Democratic Party, and no other financial support from outside groups. Despite Griffin's lack of financial support, the election was extremely close, with Watkins narrowly beating Griffin (51.5% to 48.2%).

Election	Political result	Candidate	Party	Votes	%
2025 Iowa House of Representatives Special Election; District 73; Turnout: 5,337	Republican	Blaine Watkins	Republican	2,749	
2025 Iowa House of Representatives Special Election; District 73; Turnout: 5,337	Republican	Nannette Griffin	Democratic	2,574	
