= John Wittneben =

American politician

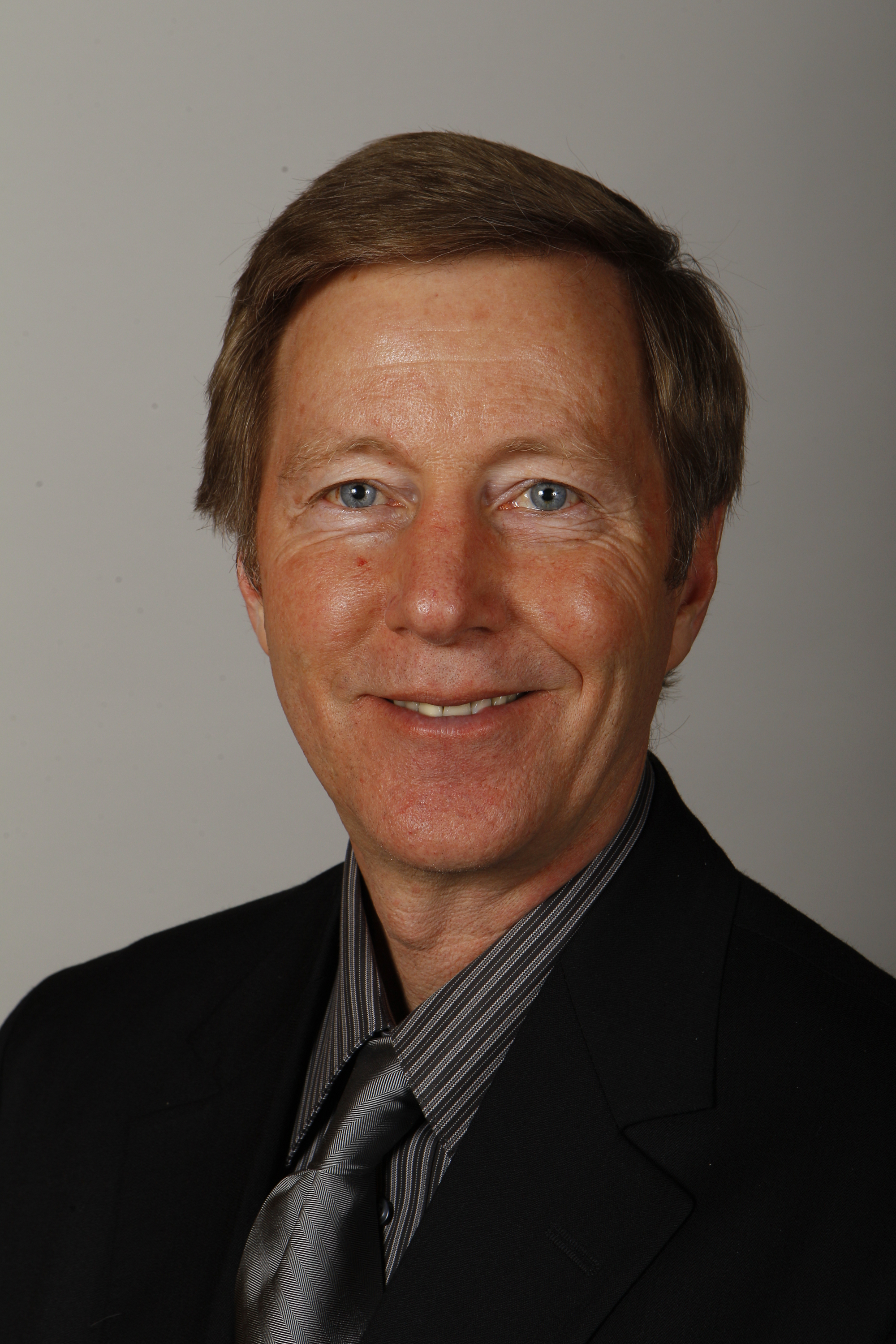

Member of the Iowa House of Representatives from the 7th district
- In office January 10, 2011 – January 13, 2013
- Preceded by: Marcella Frevert
- Succeeded by: Tedd Gassman

Personal details
- Born: April 2, 1955 (age 71) Estherville, Iowa, U.S.
- Party: Democratic
- Education: Iowa Lakes Community College
- Occupation: Land Surveyor

John Wittneben (born April 2, 1955) is an American politician in the state of Iowa.

Wittneben was born in Estherville, Iowa. A Democrat, he served in the Iowa House of Representatives from 2011 to 2013 (7th district).
