= Keishan Scott =

American politician

Member of the South Carolina House of Representatives from the 50th district
- Incumbent
- Assumed office August 22, 2025
- Preceded by: Will Wheeler

Personal details
- Born: December 2, 2000 (age 25) Lee County, South Carolina, U.S.
- Party: Democratic
- Education: Central Carolina Technical College (A); University of South Carolina (BSW)
- Website: Legislative page

Keishan M. Scott (born December 2, 2000) is an American paralegal and politician who is a member of the South Carolina House of Representatives from the 50th District, having been elected in a June 2025 special election. He is a member of the Democratic party.

== Early life, education, and career ==
Scott was born and raised in Lee County, South Carolina. At 7 years old, he became an ordained minister and at the age of 12 published the Christian book Keys to the Kingdom.

In 2019, he simultaneously graduated from Lee Central High School and from Central Carolina Technical College with an associate’s degree. In 2023, He graduated magna cum laude from the University of South Carolina studying social work.

Scott works as a paralegal. He is a board member for the Lee County Council on Aging, the third vice president for the Lee County branch of the NAACP, secretary of the Lee County Democratic Party and a member of the Alpha Phi Alpha fraternity.

== Political career ==
=== Municipal office ===
In 2023, Scott was elected to the Bishopville city council and became its youngest member at 22 years old.

=== South Carolina House of Representatives ===
After incumbent representative Will Wheeler resigned to run for the South Carolina Circuit Court, Scott announced his campaign for the June 2025 special election to fill the vacancy left in the South Carolina House of Representatives. He defeated former Bishopville city councilmember Carl Whetsel in the Democratic primary by 11 votes, requiring a recount to certify him as the winner. He faced Sumter County Republican Party Chair and former U.S. Air Force colonel Bill Oden in the general election.

Decision Desk HQ called the election for Scott approximately an hour after polls closed. At 24 years old, he is currently the youngest member serving in the South Carolina General Assembly and the youngest person to be elected to it since Brandon Newton, who was elected at age 22 in 2016.

Against the backdrop of efforts by Democrats to regain their footing after national losses in 2024, Scott's win received national attention.

Scott serves on the South Carolina House Medical, Military, Public and Municipal Affairs committee.

== Electoral history ==
2025 South Carolina House of Representatives District 50 special Democratic primary April 1, 2025
| Party | Candidate | Votes | % |
|---|---|---|---|
| Democratic | Keishan Scott | 1,436 | 50.19% |
| Democratic | Carl Whetsel | 1,425 | 49.81% |
| Total votes | | 2,861 | 100.00% |

2025 South Carolina House of Representatives District 50 special election June 3, 2025 (election night results)
| Party | Candidate | Votes | % |
|---|---|---|---|
| Democratic | Keishan Scott | 2,593 | 70.56% |
| Republican | William Oden | 1,078 | 29.33% |
| Write-in | | 4 | 0.11% |
| Total votes | | 3,675 | 100.0 |
| Democratic hold | | | |
