= Marcella Frevert =

American politician (born 1937)

Marcella R. Frevert
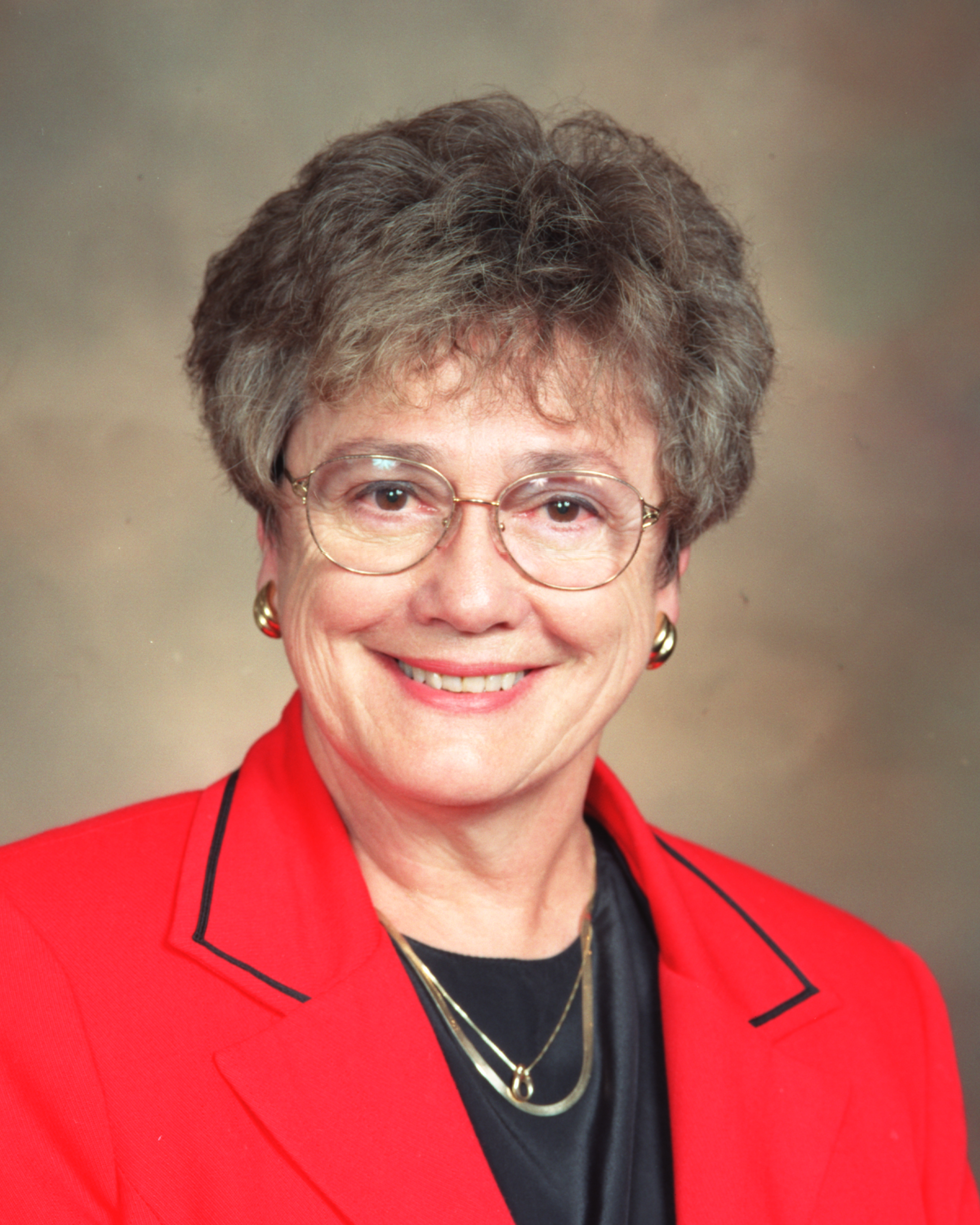

Member of the Iowa House of Representatives from the 7th district 8th (1997–2003)
- In office January 1997 – January 2011
- Preceded by: Greg Stevens
- Succeeded by: John Wittneben

Personal details
- Born: October 26, 1937 (age 88) Graetlinger, Iowa, U.S.
- Party: Democratic
- Spouse: William
- Website: legis.iowa.gov/

Marcella R. Frevert (born October 26, 1937) was the Iowa State Representative from the 7th District. She served in the Iowa House of Representatives from 1996 through 2011. She received her AA from Emmetsburg Junior College, her BS from Minnesota State University, Mankato, and her MA from the University of Northern Iowa.

Frevert currently serves on several committees in the Iowa House – the Agriculture committee; the Ways and Means committee; and the Environmental Protection committee, where she is vice chair. She also serves on the Education Appropriations Subcommittee.

Frevert was re-elected in 2006 with 7,335 votes, running unopposed.

Iowa House of Representatives
Preceded by Bill Salton	8th District; 1997–2003	Succeeded by Dolores Mertz
Preceded by Greg Stevens	7th District; 2003–2011	Succeeded by John Wittneben
