= Grady Brown =

American politician (born 1944)

Member of the South Carolina House of Representatives from the 50th district
- In office November 1984 – January 10, 2017
- Succeeded by: Will Wheeler

Personal details
- Born: Grady Allen Brown; May 1, 1944 (age 82)
- Party: Democratic
- Spouse: Laura Annette Webster (m. 1971)
- Children: 2 sons
- Occupation: Barber; businessman

Grady Allen Brown (born May 1, 1944) is a former Democratic member of the South Carolina House of Representatives, representing the 50th District from 1984 until 2017.

Brown graduated from Ashwood Central High School and later attended trade school to become a barber. He is a former president of the Lee County Chamber of Commerce, from which he served from 1974 to 1975.

Brown served with the South Carolina Air National Guard for 6 years.
