= Wendy Larson =

American politician

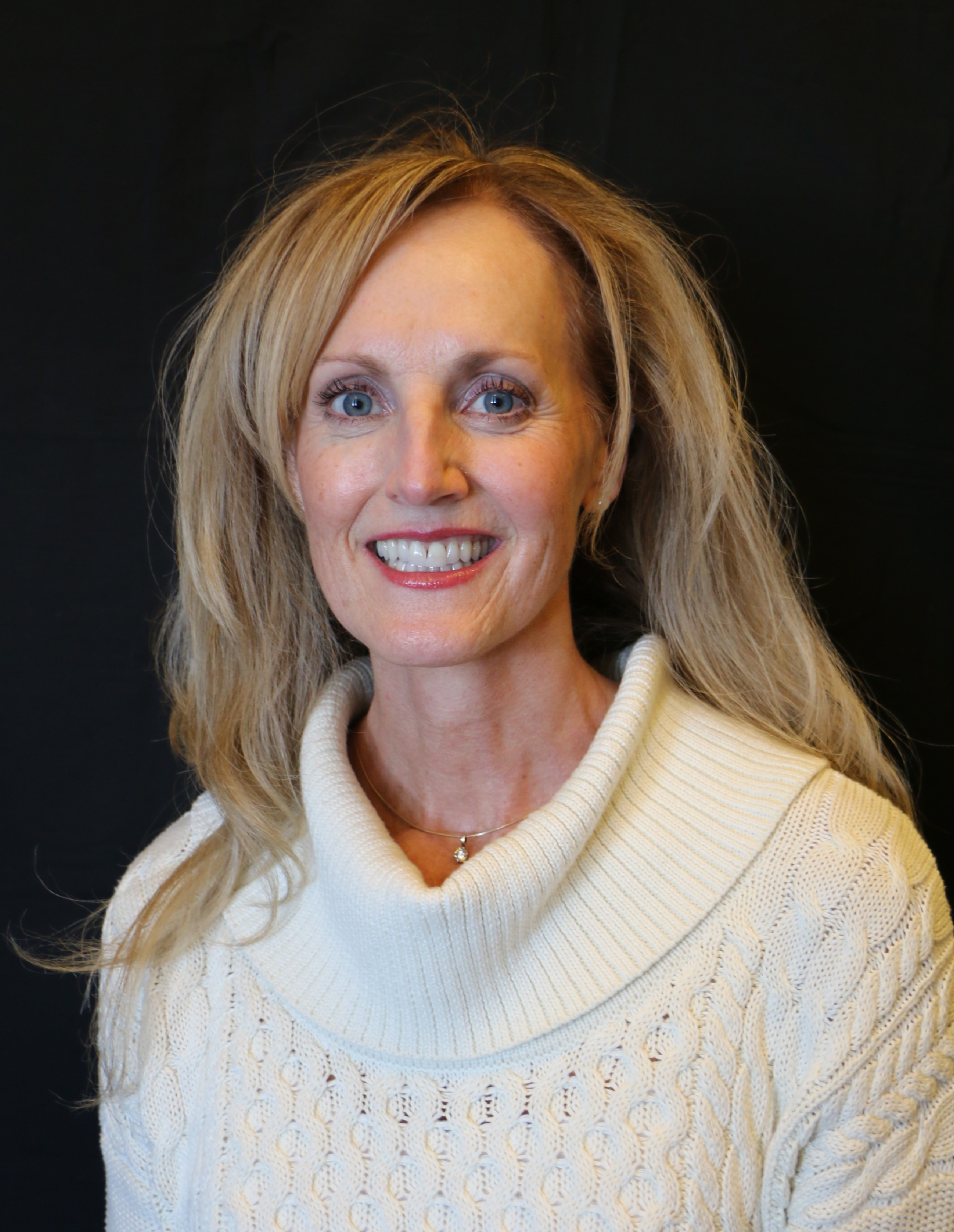

Member of the Iowa House of Representatives from the 7th district
- Incumbent
- Assumed office January 12, 2026
- Preceded by: Mike Sexton

Personal details
- Born: Wray, Colorado
- Party: Republican
- Education: University of New Hampshire
- Website: Representative Larson

Wendy Larson is an American politician who was elected as a member of the Iowa House of Representatives in a special election in 2025.

Larson earned a bachelor's degree from Colorado State University in 1993. Her career experience includes working as a stay-at-home mom and in corporate sales. Larson has served as a member, deaconess, and youth leader at Kiron Baptist Church. She has also served at the Mobile Food Pantry and on the Sac County Central Committee.

During the 2026 legislative session, Larson served on the Economic Growth & Technology committee, as well as the Education committee.
