= Angel Ramirez (politician) =

American politician

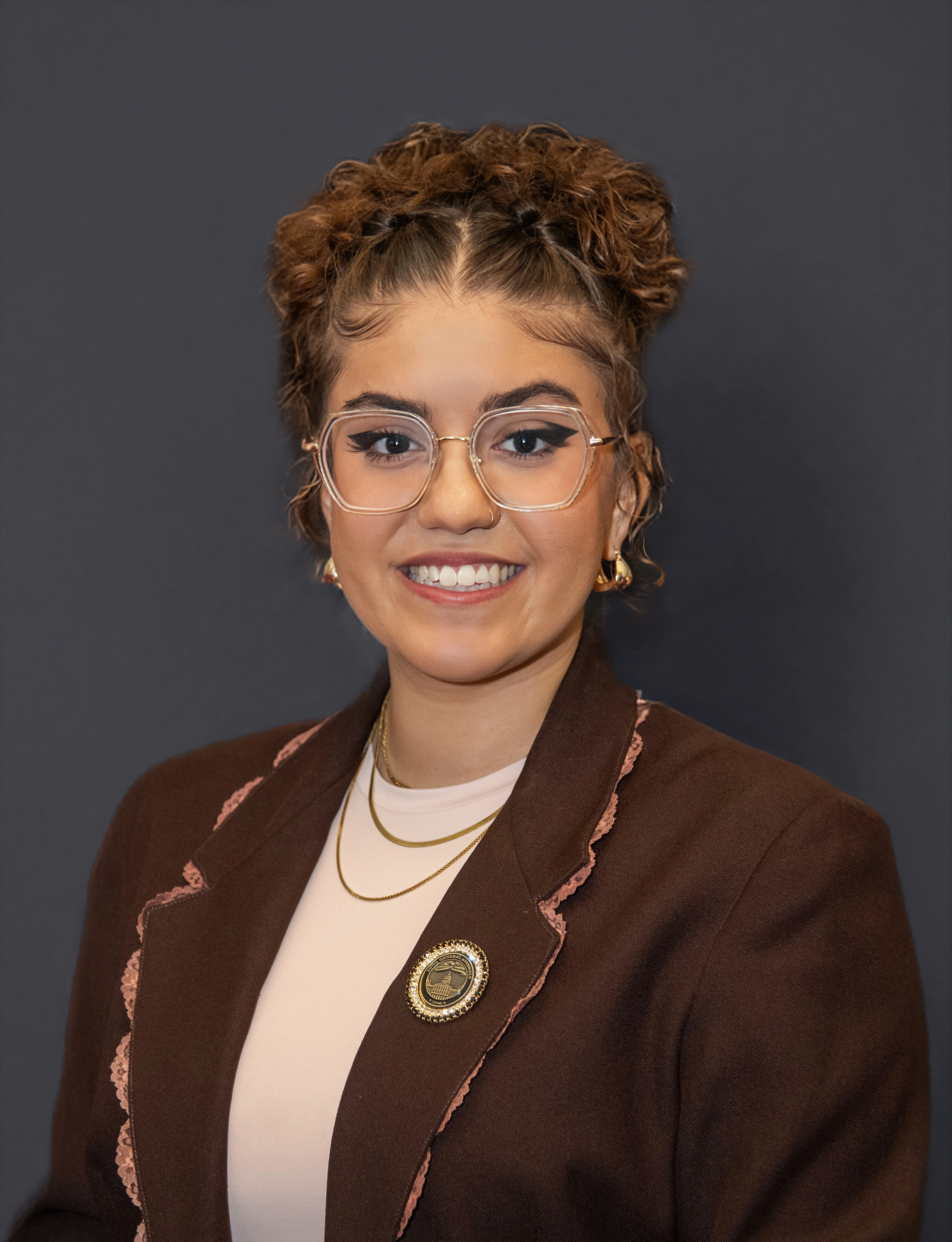
- Official portrait, 2025

Member of the Iowa House of Representatives from the 78th district
- Incumbent
- Assumed office May 13, 2025
- Preceded by: Sami Scheetz

Personal details
- Born: 1999 or 2000 (age 26–27)
- Party: Democratic Party
- Education: Coe College

Angelina Ramirez is an American politician and member of the Iowa House of Representatives. A member of the Democratic Party, she has represented the 78th district since May 2025.

== Early life and education ==
Ramirez is from California and Arizona and is the granddaughter of Mexican immigrants. Her father is Chicano and her mother is white. She moved to Cedar Rapids, Iowa, to study at Coe College. She has bachelor's degrees in political science and social and criminal justice. She was a first-generation college graduate. After graduating she made Cedar Rapids her home.

== Career ==
Ramirez is co-founder and executive director for Our Future, a non-profit fellowship program for emerging leaders in the Cedar Rapids region. Ramirez became a prominent social and racial justice advocate in Cedar Rapids following the murder of George Floyd by police officers in May 2020. She is president of the board of Advocates for Social Justice, an equity-advocacy group and a peace facilitator at the Kids First Law Center, working with students at Metro High School and McKinley STEAM Academy.

Ramirez was a legislative aide to state senator Rob Hogg and worked on Cory Booker's 2020 presidential campaign.

=== Iowa House of Representatives ===
Following the resignation of Representative Sami Scheetz on April 1, 2025, Ramirez was amongst four people seeking the Democratic Party nomination for the special election. She was selected as the party's candidate at the nomination convention for Democrats in Linn County. She was endorsed by Scheetz, Hogg, state senator Liz Bennett and several labor organizations including the Iowa Federation of Labor AFL-CIO, Hawkeye Area Labor Council and the Iowa State Education Association. She was elected to the Iowa House of Representatives at the special election held on April 29, 2025, receiving 79% of votes. She became the first Latina to be elected to the Iowa General Assembly. She will serve-out Scheetz's term which expires at the end of 2026. Ramirez has indicated that she will seek re-election at the November 2026 general election.

Election	Political result	Candidate	Party	Votes	%
2025 Iowa House of Representatives Special Election; District 73; Turnout: 3,475	Democratic	Angel Ramirez	Democratic	2,747	
2025 Iowa House of Representatives Special Election; District 73; Turnout: 3,475	Democratic	Bernie Hayes	Republican	721	
