= Will Wheeler =

American politician

Member of the South Carolina House of Representatives from the 50th district
- In office November 14, 2016 – January 17, 2025
- Preceded by: Grady Brown
- Succeeded by: Keishan Scott

Personal details
- Born: May 11, 1974 (age 52) Sumter, South Carolina, United States
- Party: Democratic
- Education: University of South Carolina (BA, JD)
- Profession: Attorney

William W. Wheeler III (born May 11, 1974) is an American politician and attorney. He is a former member of the South Carolina House of Representatives from the 50th District, serving from 2016 to 2025. He is a member of the Democratic party.

== 2016 South Carolina House race ==
Wheeler won a highly contested Democratic primary after incumbent Grady Brown opted not to run for re-election.

== 2026 South Carolina Circuit Court race ==
In January 2025 Wheeler resigned his seat effective January 17, 2025, in order to be eligible to run for a 2026 judicial appointment. In March 2026, he was appointed to Seat 2 on the 3rd Judicial Circuit Court of South Carolina.

== 2025 South Carolina House Special Election ==
See also 2025 United States state legislative elections

A Democratic primary was set for April 1, 2025 for Bishopville City Councilman Keishan Scott and businessman Carl Whetsel. Scott was certified the primary winner after a recount. One Republican candidate, Sumter County Republican Party Chair Bill Oden, filed, and did not face a primary opponent. Scott and Oden faced each other in a special election set for June 3, 2025 for Wheeler's successor to the State House seat. Scott was elected to the seat.
