= Renee Hardman =

American politician

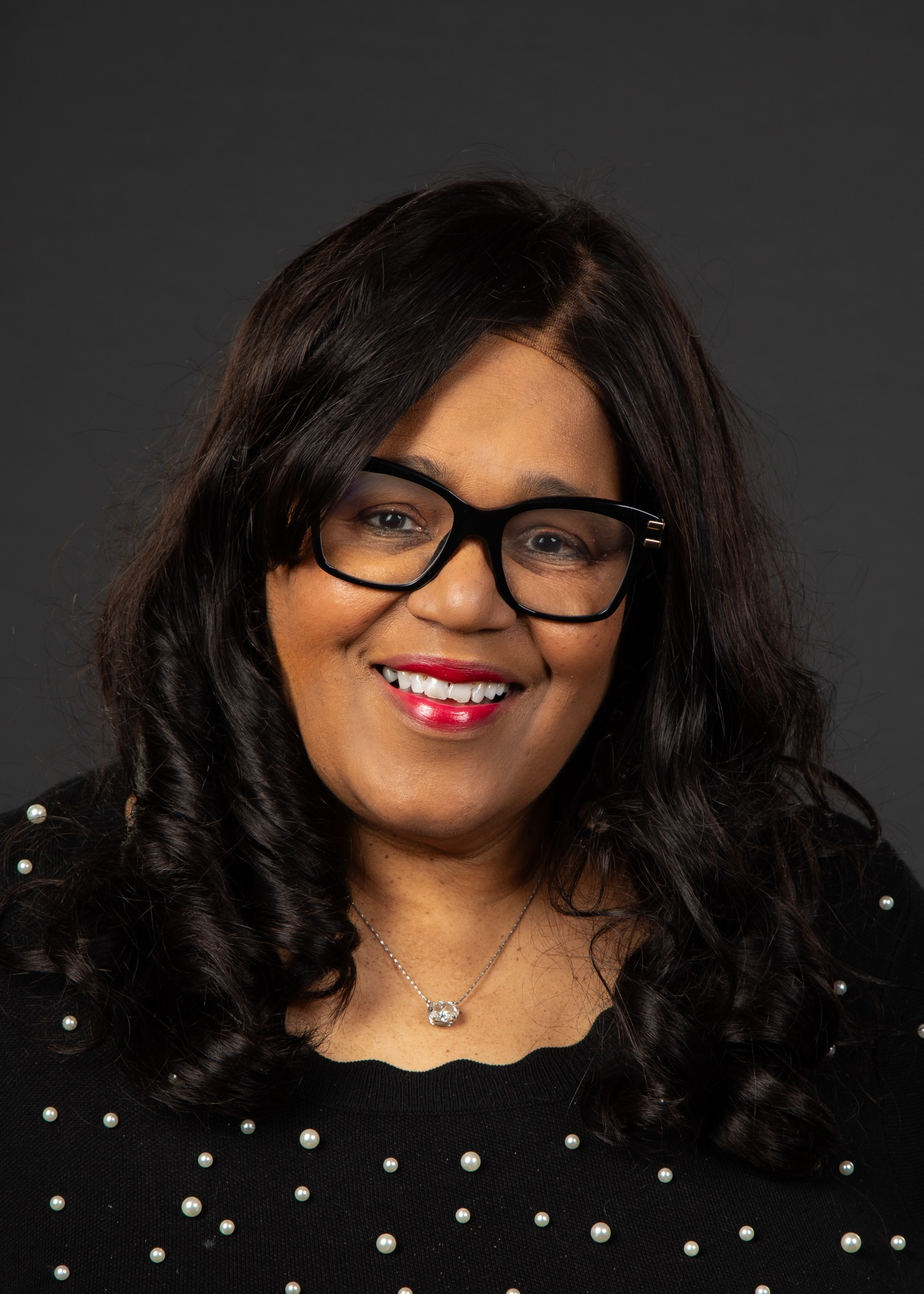
- Hardman in 2026

Member of the Iowa Senate from the 16th district
- Incumbent
- Assumed office January 12, 2026
- Preceded by: Claire Celsi

Personal details
- Born: 1960 or 1961 (age 65–66)
- Party: Democratic
- Education: Drake University (BA, MBA)

Cherry Renee Hardman (born 1960 or 1961) is an American nonprofit executive and politician who is a member of the Iowa Senate from the 16th district. A Democrat, she won a special election to the Iowa Senate in December 2025. Hardman previously served as the president and CEO of Lutheran Services in Iowa from 2024 to 2026 and as a member of the West Des Moines city council from 2017 until 2026.

== Early life and career ==
Hardman was raised by a single mother in Macon, Georgia and Maywood, Illinois. She graduated from Drake University with a Bachelor of Arts in psychology in 1983 and a Master of Business Administration in 1987. She is an alumna of Delta Sigma Theta.

Upon graduating, Hardman worked at social services organization Mainstream Living from 1983 until 1987 and then for the state of Iowa until 1994 as a training officer until joining the human services department of Bankers Trust in 1996. She left the company in 2013 as senior vice president of human services and founded human resources consulting firm Hardman Consulting. Hardman was inducted into the Iowa Women's Hall of Fame in 2014. In July 2018, she was named CEO of Big Brothers Big Sisters of Central Iowa. Broadlawns Medical Center in Des Moines announced Hardman as its president of human resources and chief diversity officer in April 2022. In January 2024, she was appointed president and CEO of Lutheran Services in Iowa. She stepped down from her role at the Lutheran Services in Iowa in July 2026.

Additionally, Hardman served as a Des Moines University trustee from 2001 to 2017.

== Political career ==
=== West Des Moines City Council ===
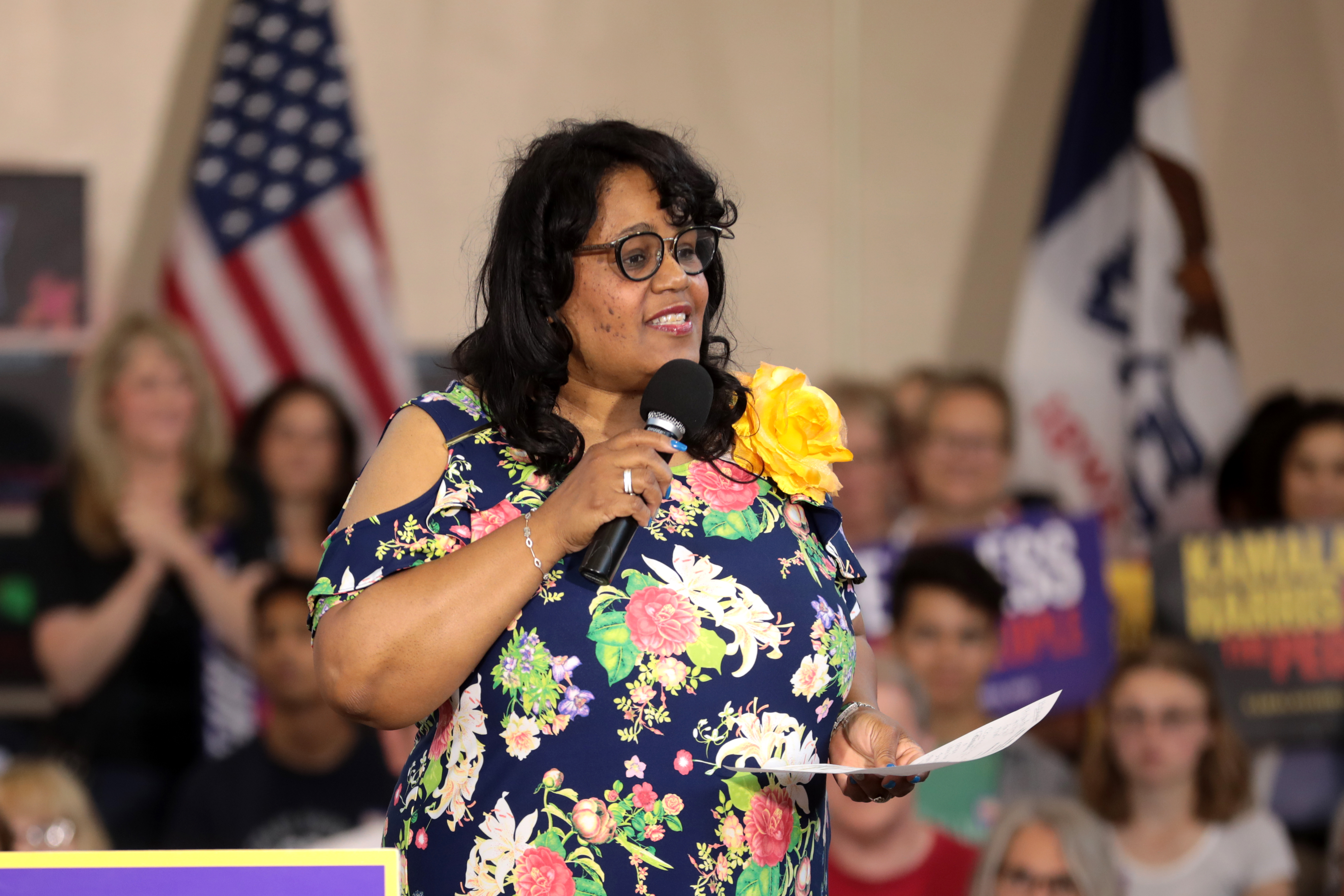
Hardman speaks at a Kamala Harris campaign rally in West Des Moines in 2019.

In November 2017, Hardman defeated incumbent at-large West Des Moines city councilmember Rick Messerschmidt by 70 votes. Her election marked the first time a Black woman was elected to the city's council. She listed addressing affordable housing, working with West Des Moines schools to promote diversity, and passing a welcoming city ordinance as priorities at her swearing-in. She was re-elected to a second term with 96% of the vote in November 2021.

Hardman pushed the council to unanimously end the city's private security contract with The Conley Group in August 2021 after a The Des Moines Register article exposed insensitive comments made by the firm's owner, Tom Conley, amidst the George Floyd protests. He then sued the city and its council for alleged defamation, tortious interference, and retaliation, and claiming his First Amendment rights were violated. The lawsuit was dismissed by a district court in March 2024 but Conley appealed the decision, leading to the U.S. Court of Appeals for the Eighth Circuit to reverse the motion to dismiss the retaliation and tortious interference claims in November 2025.

Hardman resigned her seat on January 5, 2026. She was succeeded by Fannette Elliott, who won a March 17, 2026, run-off after no candidate received a majority of the vote in a February special election.

=== Iowa Senate ===
In October 2025, Hardman was selected as the Iowa Democratic Party's nominee for the December 30th special election to replace Claire Celsi, who died while in hospice. The election garnered attention as a Republican win would restore the party's supermajority in the chamber, which it lost following two other special elections held that year, albeit the district leans Democratic and Kamala Harris received about 58% of the district's vote in the 2024 presidential election. Hardman defeated Republican nominee Lucas Loftin on election night, becoming the first Black woman elected to the Iowa Senate.

She was sworn in on January 12, 2026.

== Electoral history ==
=== 2025 ===
2025 Iowa Senate District 16 special election
| Party | Candidate | Votes | % | ±% |
|---|---|---|---|---|
| Democratic | Renee Hardman | 7,341 | 71.40% | +1.94% |
| Republican | Lucas Lifton | 2,930 | 28.50% | New |
| Write-in | | 11 | 0.11% | –0.84 |
| Total votes | | 10,282 | 100.00% | |
| Democratic hold | | | | |
