= Claire Celsi =

American state politician (1966–2025)

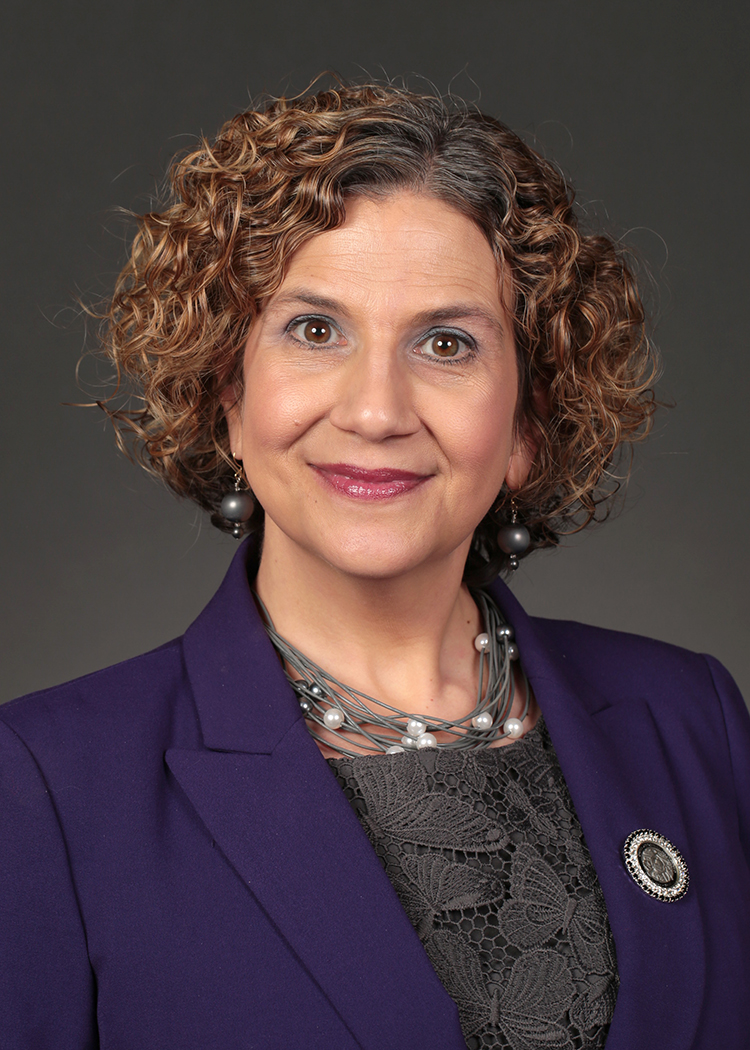
- Official portrait, 2019

Member of the Iowa Senate
- In office January 14, 2019 – October 6, 2025
- Preceded by: Matt McCoy
- Succeeded by: Renee Hardman
- Constituency: 21st district (2019–2023); 16th district (2023–2025)

Personal details
- Born: August 17, 1966 Des Moines, Iowa, U.S.
- Died: October 6, 2025 (aged 59) Des Moines, Iowa, U.S.
- Party: Democratic
- Spouse: Jim Walczyk (m. 2009)
- Education: Drake University
- Website: claire4iowa.com

Claire A. Celsi (August 17, 1966 – October 6, 2025) was an American politician who was a member of the Iowa Senate, representing Senate District 16 in Central Iowa. A member of the Democratic Party, Celsi served as senator from 2019 until her death in 2025. She was previously a public relations executive.

== Life and career ==
Born on August 17, 1966, in Des Moines, Iowa, Celsi graduated in 1984 from Dowling Catholic High School in West Des Moines, Iowa. In 2001, she received her B.A. in sociology, cum laude, from Drake University. Celsi was appointed to the Iowa Alcoholic Beverages Commission on May 10, 2010, and served for five years, including one year as chair. Celsi previously served on the Iowa Great Places Advisory Board in the Cultural Affairs Department.

Celsi was a small business owner, community volunteer and member of several community groups, boards and commissions, including the FADSS Council, the Drake University Journalism and Mass Communications National Board of Directors. Celsi was also a member of the Historic Valley Junction Foundation Board of Directors.

In 2002, Celsi left the Des Moines Public Library to work for Flynn Wright as a public relations executive. In 2004, she joined as a public relations executive at a firm called Strategic America. She owned a marketing and public relations firm, The Public Relations Project, incorporated in 2009.

Celsi married James Allen "Jim" Walczyk in May 2009 in Des Moines.

Celsi missed multiple Senate votes beginning in February, 2025, but returned to the Senate after having surgery in April for an undisclosed medical condition. In September 2025, Celsi's family reported that she would begin hospice care. She died on October 6, 2025, at the age of 59.

=== Iowa Senate elections ===
Celsi defeated Democrat Connie Ryan in the June 5, 2018, primary and went on to defeat Republican Brian Bales in the November 5, 2018, General Election. Celsi's campaign positions included opposing state funding for homeschooling, state tracking and monitoring of homeschooled students, increasing state spending on public primary schools by four percent per year, and opposing Medicaid privatization.

Senator Celsi ran for reelection in Senate district 16, after the 2021 redistricting process redrew the district. Senator Sarah Trone Garriott was also drawn into the new district 16, but moved to neighboring Dallas County to run in the new Senate district 14.

Senator Celsi won the 2022 general election, 58% to 42% percent, beating Republican candidate Bradley D. Price of West Des Moines, according to unofficial results.

Iowa Senate
Preceded by Nate Boulton	16th District; 2023–2025	Succeeded by Renee Hardman
Preceded by Matt McCoy	21st District; 2019–2023	Succeeded by Mike Bousselot
