= Sami Scheetz =

American politician (born 1996)

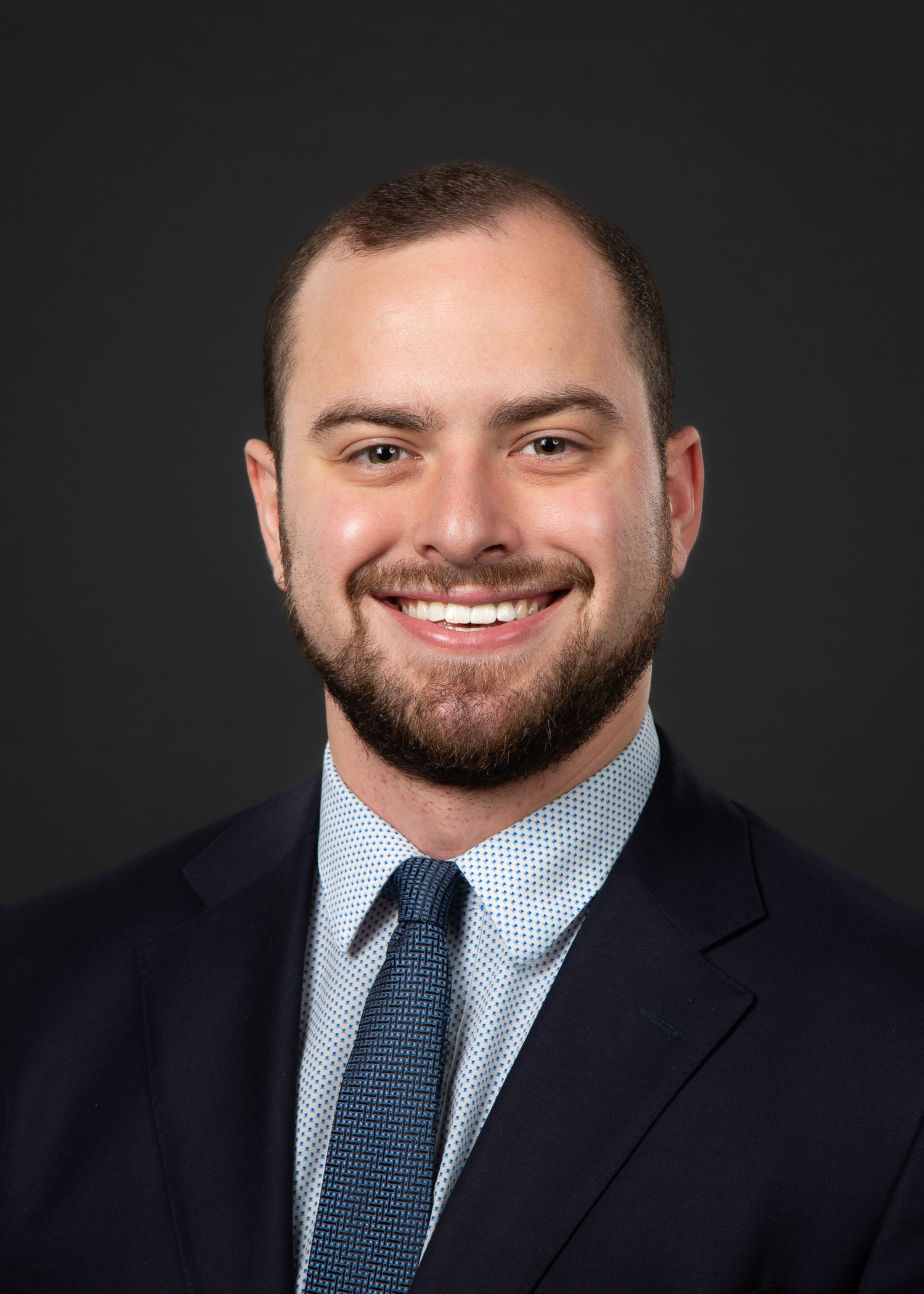
- Official portrait, 2023

Member of the Linn County Board of Supervisors from District 2
- Incumbent
- Assumed office April 1, 2025
- Preceded by: Ben Rogers

Member of the Iowa House of Representatives from the 78th district
- In office January 9, 2023 – April 1, 2025
- Preceded by: Jarad Klein (redistricting)
- Succeeded by: Angel Ramirez

Personal details
- Born: April 30, 1996 (age 30) Cedar Rapids, Iowa, U.S.
- Party: Democratic
- Spouse: Giovana Scheetz
- Children: 1
- Education: Georgetown University
- Occupation: Union Organizer

Sami Scheetz (born 1996) is an American politician and union organizer who represented the 78th district of the Iowa House of Representatives from 2023 to 2025, which consists of parts of southeastern Cedar Rapids in Linn County. He is a member of the Democratic Party and is the first Arab American to serve in the Iowa General Assembly.

== Early life and education ==
Scheetz was born on April 30, 1996, in Cedar Rapids, Iowa, where he was raised. His mother, a teacher, immigrated to the United States from Damascus, Syria, while his father is a lawyer. He graduated from Washington High School and received a bachelor's degree in government and history from Georgetown University. While attending college he worked for the United States Department of State in Dubai.

== Political career ==
Scheetz announced his candidacy for the 39th district of the Iowa Senate in June 2021. He withdrew weeks later upon Liz Bennett's entrance into the race and instead ran for the 78th district of the Iowa House of Representatives. He won the Democratic primaries unopposed on June 7, 2022, and defeated Republican Anne Fairchild in the general election on November 8 by over 3,700 votes, becoming the first Arab American to serve in the Iowa Legislature.

In 2024, Scheetz filed to run for reelection. He won the Democratic primaries unopposed on June 4, 2024, and ran unopposed in the general election on November 5, 2024.

Scheetz served on the Commerce, Labor, State Government, and Ways and Means committees.

Scheetz has said that his priorities include education, healthcare, and workers' rights. He supports making community college free and legalizing marijuana. He does not support the use of eminent domain for the construction of CO_{2} pipelines. He is pro-choice.

Scheetz previously worked with the Bernie Sanders 2020 presidential campaign, Fred Hubbell's 2018 campaign for governor, and Michael Franken's 2022 campaign for US senator.

Scheetz resigned from the Iowa House in April 2025 after being appointed to the Linn County Board of Supervisors.

== Personal life ==
Scheetz resides in Cedar Rapids with his wife and daughter. He is a union organizer for Teamsters Local 238.

== Electoral history ==
Election	Political result	Candidate	Party	Votes	%
Iowa House of Representatives Democratic primary elections, 2022; District 78; Turnout: 2,424	Democratic (newly redistricted)	Sami Scheetz	Democratic	2,405	99.2
Iowa House of Representatives Democratic primary elections, 2022; District 78; Turnout: 2,424	Democratic (newly redistricted)	Other/Write-in votes		19	0.8
Iowa House of Representatives general elections, 2022; District 78; Turnout: 10,731	Democratic (newly redistricted)	Sami Scheetz	Democratic	7,239	67.5
Iowa House of Representatives general elections, 2022; District 78; Turnout: 10,731	Democratic (newly redistricted)	Anne Fairchild	Republican	3,466	32.3
Iowa House of Representatives general elections, 2022; District 78; Turnout: 10,731	Democratic (newly redistricted)	Other/Write-in votes		26	0.2
