= Iowa's 100th House of Representatives district =

American legislative district

House District 100
- Type: District of the Lower house
- Location: Iowa
- Representative: Blaine Watkins
- Parent organization: Iowa General Assembly

The 100th District of the Iowa House of Representatives in the state of Iowa. It is currently composed of part of Lee County.

== Past representatives ==
The district has previously been represented by:

- John Clark, 1971–1973
- George J. Knoke, 1973–1975
- Craig D. Walter, 1975–1981
- Marcia Walter, 1981–1983
- Emil S. Pavich, 1983–1993
- Dennis Cohoon, 1993–2003
- Brad Hansen, 2003–2003
- Paul Shomshor, 2003–2011
- Mark Brandenburg, 2011–2013
- Charles Isenhart, 2013–2023
- Martin Graber, 2023–2025
- Blaine Watkins, 2025–present
