= Mike Sexton (politician) =

American politician (born 1961)

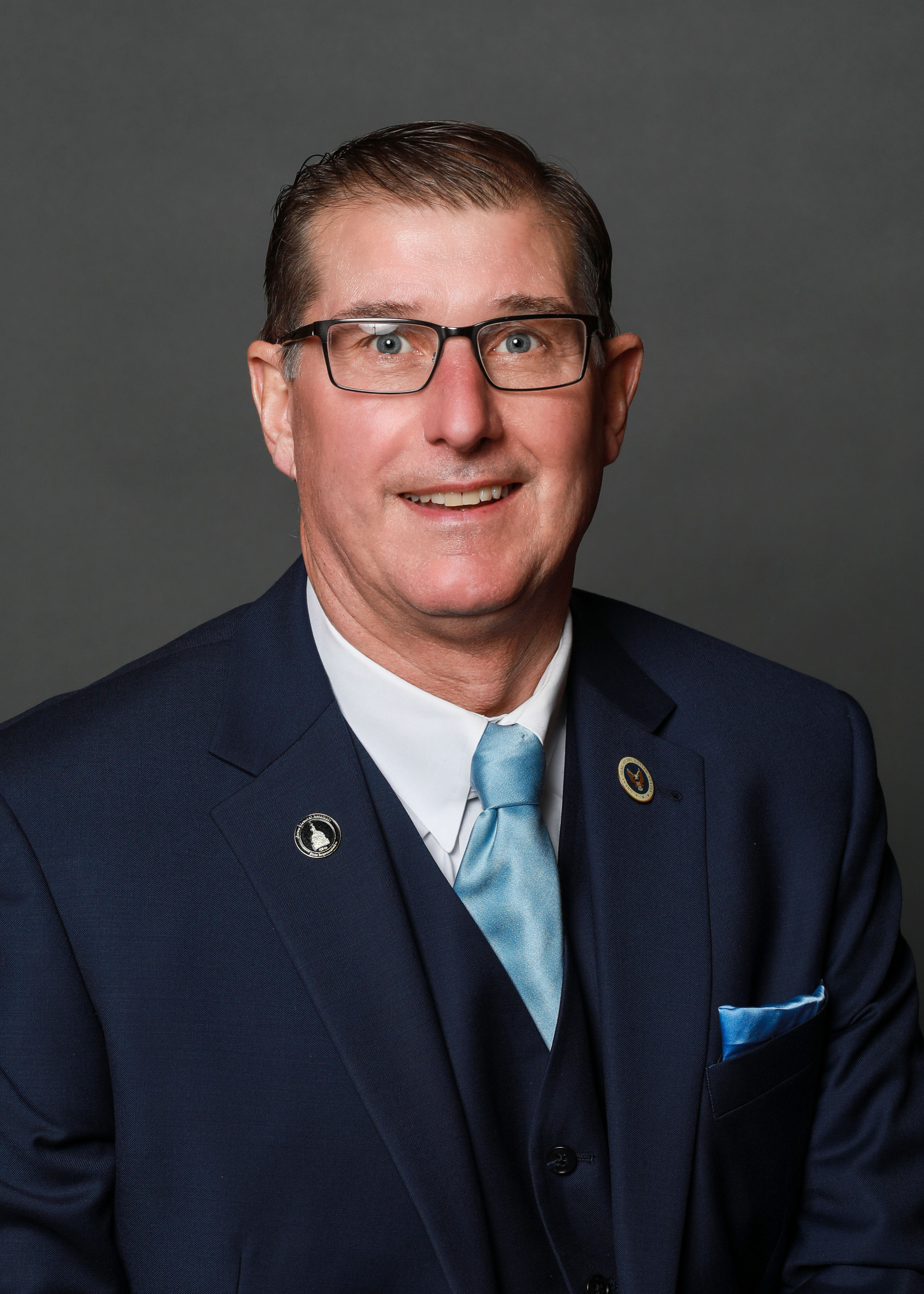
- Official portrait, 2021

Director of Iowa's Rural Development
- Incumbent
- Assumed office September 19, 2025
- Appointed by: Donald Trump
- Preceded by: Kate Sand (acting)

Member of the Iowa House of Representatives from the 7th district
- In office January 12, 2015 – September 19, 2025
- Succeeded by: Wendy Larson

Member of the Iowa Senate from the 7th district
- In office January 11, 1999 – January 12, 2003

Personal details
- Born: August 22, 1961 (age 65) Fort Dodge, Iowa, U.S.
- Party: Republican
- Spouse: Becky
- Children: 5
- Education: Iowa Lakes Community College
- Occupation: Farmer/Environmental Consultant

Michael Sexton (born August 22, 1961) is an American politician who served in the Iowa House of Representatives as a Republican representative for District 7 from 2015 to 2025.

Sexton was born in Fort Dodge and attended Iowa Lakes Community College. He is a farmer. A Republican, he also served in the Iowa State Senate from 1999 to 2003 (7th district).

He resigned his Iowa House seat to accept an appointment, from Donald Trump, to be the Director of Iowa's Rural Development under the USDA.

Iowa House of Representatives
| Preceded by Henry Stone | 7th District; 2023–2025 | Succeeded by Wendy Larson |
| Preceded by | 10th District; 2015–2023 | Succeeded by John Wills |
