= 2016 South Carolina House of Representatives election =

- November 8, 2016

All 124 seats in the South Carolina House of Representatives 63 seats needed for a majority
- Turnout: 67.85%
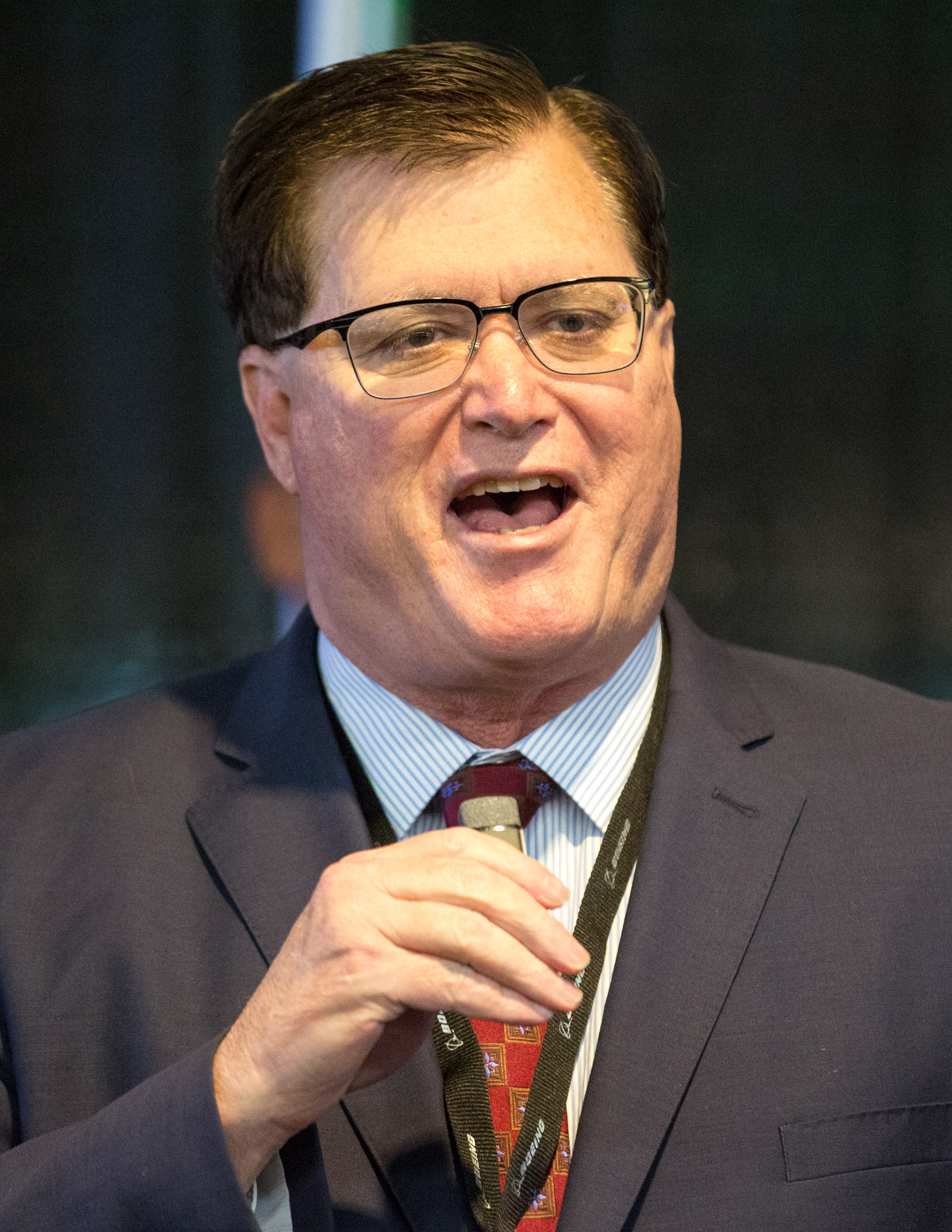

| | Majority party | Minority party |
|---|---|---|
| Leader | Jay Lucas | J. Todd Rutherford |
| Party | Republican | Democratic |
| Leader since | December 2, 2014 | January 8, 2013 |
| Leader's seat | 121st | 101st |
| Last election | 78 | 46 |
| Seats won | 80 | 44 |
| Seat change | ▲2 | ▼2 |
| Popular vote | 869,238 | 572,739 |
| Percentage | 58.48% | 38.53% |
| Swing | ▼4.73% | ▲3.57% |
- Results: Republican gain Republican hold Democratic hold
Speaker before election
Jay Lucas
Republican
Elected Speaker
Jay Lucas
Republican

The 2016 South Carolina House of Representatives elections took place as part of the biennial United States elections. South Carolina voters elected state representatives in all 124 of the state house's districts. State representatives serve two-year terms in the South Carolina State House. A statewide map of South Carolina's state House districts can be obtained from the South Carolina House's website here, and individual district maps can be obtained from the U.S. Census here.

A primary election on June 14, 2016, and a primary runoff on June 28, 2016, in races in which no candidate received over 50% of his/her party's primary vote, determined which candidates appeared on the November 8 general election ballot. Primary election results can be obtained from the South Carolina Secretary of State's website.

Following the 2014 state house elections, Republicans maintained effective control of the House with 80 members. Democrats held 44 seats following the 2016 elections.

In the 2016 election, Republicans gained 2 seats, thus maintaining an 80-to-44-seat majority over Democrats.

== Results ==
| Party | Votes | | Seats | | |
| Party | No. | % | No. | +/− | % |
|---|---|---|---|---|---|
| South Carolina Republican Party | 869,238 | 58.48 | 80 | 0 | 64.52 |
| South Carolina Democratic Party | 572,739 | 38.53 | 44 | 0 | 35.48 |
| Write-in | 17,271 | 1.16 | 0 | 0 | 0.00 |
| Libertarian Party of South Carolina | 13,064 | 0.88 | 0 | 0 | 0.00 |
| Working Families Party | 4,612 | 0.31 | 0 | 0 | 0.00 |
| American Party of South Carolina | 4,294 | 0.29 | 0 | 0 | 0.00 |
| United Citizens Party | 3,611 | 0.24 | 0 | 0 | 0.00 |
| Independent | 1,648 | 0.11 | 0 | 0 | 0.00 |
| Total | 1,486,477 | 100.00 | 124 | ±0 | 100.00 |
| Registered voters | 3,137,659 | 100.00 | | | |
| Turnout | 1,486,477 | 47.38 | | | |
Source: South Carolina Election Commission

Popular vote
| Republican | 58.48% |
| Democratic | 38.53% |
| Other | 2.99% |

House seats
| Republican | 64.52% |
| Democratic | 35.48% |

== Predictions ==
| Source | Ranking | As of |
|---|---|---|
| Governing | Safe R | October 12, 2016 |

== Summary of results by State House District ==
Election results:

| State House District | Incumbent | Party | Elected Representative | Party |
|---|---|---|---|---|
| 1st | Bill Whitmire | Republican | Bill Whitmire | Republican |
| 2nd | Bill Sandifer III | Republican | Bill Sandifer III | Republican |
| 3rd | Gary E. Clary | Republican | Gary E. Clary | Republican |
| 4th | Davey Hiott | Republican | Davey Hiott | Republican |
| 5th | Neal Collins | Republican | Neal Collins | Republican |
| 6th | Brian White | Republican | Brian White | Republican |
| 7th | Jay West | Republican | Jay West | Republican |
| 8th | Jonathon Hill | Republican | Jonathon Hill | Republican |
| 9th | Anne Thayer | Republican | Anne Thayer | Republican |
| 10th | Joshua Putnam | Republican | West Cox | Republican |
| 11th | Craig Gagnon | Republican | Craig Gagnon | Republican |
| 12th | J. Anne Parks | Democratic | J. Anne Parks | Democratic |
| 13th | John McCravy | Republican | John McCravy | Republican |
| 14th | Michael Pitts | Republican | Michael Pitts | Republican |
| 15th | Samuel Rivers, Jr. | Republican | J.A. Moore | Democratic |
| 16th | Mark Willis | Republican | Mark Willis | Republican |
| 17th | Mike Burns | Republican | Mike Burns | Republican |
| 18th | Tommy Stringer | Republican | Tommy Stringer | Republican |
| 19th | Dwight Loftis | Republican | Dwight Loftis | Republican |
| 20th | Dan Hamilton | Republican | Adam Morgan | Republican |
| 21st | Phyllis Henderson | Republican | Bobby Cox | Republican |
| 22nd | Jason Elliott | Republican | Jason Elliott | Republican |
| 23rd | Chandra Dillard | Democratic | Chandra Dillard | Democratic |
| 24th | Bruce Bannister | Republican | Bruce Bannister | Republican |
| 25th | Leola Robinson-Simpson | Democratic | Leola Robinson-Simpson | Democratic |
| 26th | R. Raye Felder | Republican | R. Raye Felder | Republican |
| 27th | Garry Smith | Republican | Garry Smith | Republican |
| 28th | Ashley Trantham | Republican | Ashley Trantham | Republican |
| 29th | Dennis Moss | Republican | Dennis Moss | Republican |
| 30th | Steve Moss | Republican | Steve Moss | Republican |
| 31st | Rosalyn Henderson Myers | Democratic | Rosalyn Henderson Myers | Democratic |
| 32nd | Derham Cole, Jr. | Republican | Max Hyde | Republican |
| 33rd | Eddie Tallon | Republican | Eddie Tallon | Republican |
| 34th | Mike Forrester | Republican | Mike Forrester | Republican |
| 35th | Bill Chumley | Republican | Bill Chumley | Republican |
| 36th | Merita Ann Allison | Republican | Merita Ann Allison | Republican |
| 37th | Steven Long | Republican | Steven Long | Republican |
| 38th | Josiah Magnuson | Republican | Josiah Magnuson | Republican |
| 39th | Cal Forrest | Republican | Cal Forrest | Republican |
| 40th | Richard Martin | Republican | Richard Martin | Republican |
| 41st | MaryGail Douglas | Democratic | Annie McDaniel | Democratic |
| 42nd | Michael Anthony | Democratic | Doug Gilliam | Republican |
| 43rd | Francis Delleney, Jr. | Republican | Randy Ligon | Republican |
| 44th | Mandy Powers Norrell | Democratic | Mandy Powers Norrell | Democratic |
| 45th | Brandon Newton | Republican | Brandon Newton | Republican |
| 46th | Gary Simrill | Republican | Gary Simrill | Republican |
| 47th | Tommy Pope | Republican | Tommy Pope | Republican |
| 48th | Bruce M. Bryant | Republican | Bruce M. Bryant | Republican |
| 49th | John King | Democratic | John King | Democratic |
| 50th | Will Wheeler | Democratic | Will Wheeler | Democratic |
| 51st | J. David Weeks | Democratic | J. David Weeks | Democratic |
| 52nd | Laurie Funderburk | Democratic | Laurie Funderburk | Democratic |
| 53rd | Richie Yow | Republican | Richie Yow | Republican |
| 54th | Patricia Henegan | Democratic | Patricia Henegan | Democratic |
| 55th | Jackie Hayes | Democratic | Jackie Hayes | Democratic |
| 56th | Tim McGinnis | Republican | Tim McGinnis | Republican |
| 57th | Lucas Atkinson | Democratic | Lucas Atkinson | Democratic |
| 58th | Jeff Johnson | Republican | Jeff Johnson | Republican |
| 59th | Terry Alexander | Democratic | Terry Alexander | Democratic |
| 60th | Phillip Lowe | Republican | Phillip Lowe | Republican |
| 61st | Roger Kirby | Democratic | Roger Kirby | Democratic |
| 62nd | Robert Williams | Democratic | Robert Williams | Democratic |
| 63rd | Jay Jordan | Republican | Jay Jordan | Republican |
| 64th | Robert L. Ridgeway III | Democratic | Robert L. Ridgeway III | Democratic |
| 65th | James "Jay" Lucas | Republican | James "Jay" Lucas | Republican |
| 66th | Gilda Cobb-Hunter | Democratic | Gilda Cobb-Hunter | Democratic |
| 67th | George Smith, Jr. | Republican | George Smith, Jr. | Republican |
| 68th | Heather Ammons Crawford | Republican | Heather Ammons Crawford | Republican |
| 69th | Chris Wooten | Republican | Chris Wooten | Republican |
| 70th | Wendy Brawley | Democratic | Wendy Brawley | Democratic |
| 71st | Nathan Ballentine | Republican | Nathan Ballentine | Republican |
| 72nd | James Smith, Jr. | Democratic | Seth Rose | Democratic |
| 73rd | Christopher Hart | Democratic | Christopher Hart | Democratic |
| 74th | James Rutherford | Democratic | James Rutherford | Democratic |
| 75th | Kirkman Finlay III | Republican | Kirkman Finlay III | Republican |
| 76th | Leon Howard | Democratic | Leon Howard | Democratic |
| 77th | Joseph McEachern | Democratic | Kambrell Garvin | Democratic |
| 78th | Beth Bernstein | Democratic | Beth Bernstein | Democratic |
| 79th | Ivory Thigpen | Democratic | Ivory Thigpen | Democratic |
| 80th | Jimmy Bales | Democratic | Jimmy Bales | Democratic |
| 81st | Bart Blackwell | Republican | Bart Blackwell | Republican |
| 82nd | William Clyburn, Sr. | Democratic | William Clyburn, Sr. | Democratic |
| 83rd | Bill Hixon | Republican | Bill Hixon | Republican |
| 84th | Ronnie Young | Republican | Ronnie Young | Republican |
| 85th | Chip Huggins | Republican | Chip Huggins | Republican |
| 86th | Bill Taylor | Republican | Bill Taylor | Republican |
| 87th | Todd Atwater | Republican | Paula Rawl Calhoon | Republican |
| 88th | McLain Toole | Republican | McLain Toole | Republican |
| 89th | Micah Caskey | Republican | Micah Caskey | Republican |
| 90th | Justin Bamberg | Democratic | Justin Bamberg | Democratic |
| 91st | Lonnie Hosey | Democratic | Lonnie Hosey | Democratic |
| 92nd | Joseph Daning | Republican | Joseph Daning | Republican |
| 93rd | Russell L. Ott | Democratic | Russell L. Ott | Democratic |
| 94th | Katie Arrington | Republican | Con Chellis | Republican |
| 95th | Jerry Govan, Jr. | Democratic | Jerry Govan, Jr. | Democratic |
| 96th | Lawrence Kit Spires | Republican | Lawrence Kit Spires | Republican |
| 97th | Patsy Knight | Democratic | Mandy Kimmons | Republican |
| 98th | Chris Murphy | Republican | Chris Murphy | Republican |
| 99th | Nancy Mace | Republican | Nancy Mace | Republican |
| 100th | Sylleste Davis | Republican | Sylleste Davis | Republican |
| 101st | Cezar McKnight | Democratic | Cezar McKnight | Democratic |
| 102nd | Joseph Jefferson, Jr. | Democratic | Joseph Jefferson, Jr. | Democratic |
| 103rd | Carl Anderson | Democratic | Carl Anderson | Democratic |
| 104th | Greg Duckworth | Republican | William Bailey | Republican |
| 105th | Kevin J. Hardee | Republican | Kevin J. Hardee | Republican |
| 106th | Russell Fry | Republican | Russell Fry | Republican |
| 107th | Alan Clemmons | Republican | Alan Clemmons | Republican |
| 108th | Lee Hewitt | Republican | Lee Hewitt | Republican |
| 109th | David Mack | Democratic | David Mack | Democratic |
| 110th | William S. Cogswell, Jr. | Republican | William S. Cogswell, Jr. | Republican |
| 111th | Wendell Gilliard | Democratic | Wendell Gilliard | Democratic |
| 112th | Mike Sottile | Republican | Mike Sottile | Republican |
| 113th | Marvin Pendarvis | Democratic | Marvin Pendarvis | Democratic |
| 114th | Lin Bennett | Republican | Lin Bennett | Republican |
| 115th | Peter McCoy | Republican | Peter McCoy | Republican |
| 116th | Robert Brown | Democratic | Robert Brown | Democratic |
| 117th | Bill Crosby | Republican | Krystle Matthews | Democratic |
| 118th | Bill Herbkersman | Republican | Bill Herbkersman | Republican |
| 119th | Leon Stavrinakis | Democratic | Leon Stavrinakis | Democratic |
| 120th | Weston Newton | Republican | Weston Newton | Republican |
| 121st | Michael Rivers | Democratic | Michael Rivers | Democratic |
| 122nd | William Bowers | Democratic | Shedron Williams | Democratic |
| 123rd | Jeff Bradley | Republican | Jeff Bradley | Republican |
| 124th | Shannon Erickson | Republican | Shannon Erickson | Republican |

== Detailed Results by State House District ==
=== District 1 ===
1st District General Election
| Party | Candidate | Votes | % |
|---|---|---|---|
| Republican | Bill Whitmire (incumbent) | 11,287 | 98.63 |
| Write-in | | 157 | 1.37 |
| Total votes | | 11,444 | 100.0 |
| Republican hold | | | |

=== District 2 ===
2nd District General Election
| Party | Candidate | Votes | % |
|---|---|---|---|
| Republican | Bill Sandifer (incumbent) | 9,276 | 64.11 |
| Democratic | Jody G. Gaulin | 5,178 | 35.79 |
| Write-in | | 15 | 0.10 |
| Total votes | | 14,469 | 100.0 |
| Republican hold | | | |

=== District 3 ===
3rd District General Election
| Party | Candidate | Votes | % |
|---|---|---|---|
| Republican | Gary Clary (incumbent) | 7,576 | 97.18 |
| Write-in | | 220 | 2.82 |
| Total votes | | 7,796 | 100.0 |
| Republican hold | | | |

=== District 4 ===
4th District General Election
| Party | Candidate | Votes | % |
|---|---|---|---|
| Republican | Davey Hiott (incumbent) | 11,883 | 98.74 |
| Write-in | | 152 | 1.26 |
| Total votes | | 12,035 | 100.0 |
| Republican hold | | | |

=== District 5 ===
5th District General Election
| Party | Candidate | Votes | % |
|---|---|---|---|
| Republican | Neal Collins (incumbent) | 11,617 | 97.21 |
| Write-in | | 334 | 2.79 |
| Total votes | | 11,951 | 100.0 |
| Republican hold | | | |

=== District 6 ===
6th District General Election
| Party | Candidate | Votes | % |
|---|---|---|---|
| Republican | Brian White (incumbent) | 10,243 | 82.52 |
| American | Ryan Cowsert | 2,095 | 16.88 |
| Write-in | | 75 | 0.60 |
| Total votes | | 12,413 | 100.0 |
| Republican hold | | | |

=== District 7 ===
7th District General Election
| Party | Candidate | Votes | % |
|---|---|---|---|
| Republican | Jay West (incumbent) | 8,201 | 98.56 |
| Write-in | | 120 | 1.44 |
| Total votes | | 8,321 | 100.0 |
| Republican hold | | | |

=== District 8 ===
8th District General Election
| Party | Candidate | Votes | % |
|---|---|---|---|
| Republican | Jonathon Hill (incumbent) | 10,186 | 98.15 |
| Write-in | | 192 | 1.85 |
| Total votes | | 10,378 | 100.0 |
| Republican hold | | | |

=== District 9 ===
9th District General Election
| Party | Candidate | Votes | % |
|---|---|---|---|
| Republican | Anne Thayer (incumbent) | 9,165 | 97.89 |
| Write-in | | 198 | 2.11 |
| Total votes | | 9,363 | 100.0 |
| Republican hold | | | |

=== District 10 ===
10th District General Election
| Party | Candidate | Votes | % |
|---|---|---|---|
| Republican | West Cox | 10,471 | 76.63 |
| Democratic | Lucy Hoffman | 3,190 | 23.35 |
| Write-in | | 3 | 0.02 |
| Total votes | | 13,664 | 100.0 |
| Republican hold | | | |

=== District 11 ===
11th District General Election
| Party | Candidate | Votes | % |
|---|---|---|---|
| Republican | Craig A. Gagnon (incumbent) | 7,292 | 65.50 |
| Democratic | Devon D. Smith | 3,832 | 34.42 |
| Write-in | | 9 | 0.08 |
| Total votes | | 11,133 | 100.0 |
| Republican hold | | | |

=== District 12 ===
12th District General Election
| Party | Candidate | Votes | % |
|---|---|---|---|
| Democratic | Anne Parks (incumbent) | 7,256 | 96.70 |
| Write-in | | 248 | 3.30 |
| Total votes | | 7,504 | 100.0 |
| Democratic hold | | | |

=== District 13 ===
13th District General Election
| Party | Candidate | Votes | % |
|---|---|---|---|
| Republican | John McCravy (incumbent) | 10,353 | 71.55 |
| Democratic | Michael Gaskin | 4,109 | 28.40 |
| Write-in | | 7 | 0.05 |
| Total votes | | 14,469 | 100.0 |
| Republican hold | | | |

=== District 14 ===
14th District General Election
| Party | Candidate | Votes | % |
|---|---|---|---|
| Republican | Mike Pitts (incumbent) | 10,356 | 97.86 |
| Write-in | | 226 | 2.14 |
| Total votes | | 10,582 | 100.0 |
| Republican hold | | | |

=== District 15 ===
15th District General Election
| Party | Candidate | Votes | % |
|---|---|---|---|
| Democratic | J.A. Moore | 4,569 | 49.67 |
| Working Families | J.A. Moore | 249 | 2.71 |
| TOTAL | J.A. Moore | 4,818 | 52.38 |
| Republican | Samuel Rivers, Jr. (incumbent) | 4,372 | 47.53 |
| Write-in | | 9 | 0.10 |
| Total votes | | 9,199 | 100.0 |
| Democratic gain from Republican | | | |

=== District 16 ===
16th District General Election
| Party | Candidate | Votes | % |
|---|---|---|---|
| Republican | Mark Willis (incumbent) | 9,259 | 97.11 |
| Write-in | | 276 | 2.89 |
| Total votes | | 9,535 | 100.0 |
| Republican hold | | | |

=== District 17 ===
17th District General Election
| Party | Candidate | Votes | % |
|---|---|---|---|
| Republican | Mike Burns (incumbent) | 11,598 | 76.03 |
| Democratic | Judi Buckley | 3,641 | 23.87 |
| Write-in | | 15 | 0.10 |
| Total votes | | 15,254 | 100.0 |
| Republican hold | | | |

=== District 18 ===
18th District General Election
| Party | Candidate | Votes | % |
|---|---|---|---|
| Republican | Tommy Stringer (incumbent) | 12,110 | 97.96 |
| Write-in | | 252 | 2.04 |
| Total votes | | 12,362 | 100.0 |
| Republican hold | | | |

=== District 19 ===
19th District General Election
| Party | Candidate | Votes | % |
|---|---|---|---|
| Republican | Dwight Loftis (incumbent) | 6,744 | 61.16 |
| TOTAL | Carrie Counton | 4,272 | 38.74 |
| Democratic | Carrie Counton | 4,038 | 36.62 |
| Working Families | Carrie Counton | 234 | 2.12 |
| Write-in | | 10 | 0.09 |
| Total votes | | 11,026 | 100.0 |
| Republican hold | | | |

=== District 20 ===
20th District General Election
| Party | Candidate | Votes | % |
|---|---|---|---|
| Republican | Adam Morgan | 12,234 | 97.61 |
| Write-in | | 299 | 2.39 |
| Total votes | | 12,533 | 100.0 |
| Republican hold | | | |

=== District 21 ===
21st District General Election
| Party | Candidate | Votes | % |
|---|---|---|---|
| Republican | Bobby Cox | 13,826 | 97.93 |
| Write-in | | 292 | 2.07 |
| Total votes | | 14,118 | 100.0 |
| Republican hold | | | |

=== District 22 ===
22nd District General Election
| Party | Candidate | Votes | % |
|---|---|---|---|
| Republican | Jason Elliott (incumbent) | 9,955 | 63.35 |
| Democratic | B.K. Brown | 5,673 | 36.10 |
| Write-in | | 86 | 0.55 |
| Total votes | | 15,714 | 100.0 |
| Republican hold | | | |

=== District 23 ===
23rd District General Election
| Party | Candidate | Votes | % |
|---|---|---|---|
| Democratic | Chandra Dillard (incumbent) | 7,728 | 97.72 |
| Write-in | | 180 | 2.28 |
| Total votes | | 7,908 | 100.0 |
| Democratic hold | | | |

=== District 24 ===
24th District General Election
| Party | Candidate | Votes | % |
|---|---|---|---|
| Republican | Bruce Bannister (incumbent) | 12,992 | 97.03 |
| Write-in | | 398 | 2.97 |
| Total votes | | 13,390 | 100.0 |
| Republican hold | | | |

=== District 25 ===
25th District General Election
| Party | Candidate | Votes | % |
|---|---|---|---|
| Democratic | Leola Robinson-Simpson (incumbent) | 7,623 | 81.57 |
| Independent | Tony Boyce | 1,648 | 17.64 |
| Write-in | | 74 | 0.79 |
| Total votes | | 9,345 | 100.0 |
| Democratic hold | | | |

=== District 26 ===
26th District General Election
| Party | Candidate | Votes | % |
|---|---|---|---|
| Republican | Raye Felder (incumbent) | 10,940 | 57.12 |
| Democratic | John Kraljevich | 8,205 | 42.84 |
| Write-in | | 9 | 0.05 |
| Total votes | | 19,154 | 100.0 |
| Republican hold | | | |

=== District 27 ===
27th District General Election
| Party | Candidate | Votes | % |
|---|---|---|---|
| Republican | Garry R. Smith (incumbent) | 10,994 | 96.74 |
| Write-in | | 371 | 3.26 |
| Total votes | | 11,365 | 100.0 |
| Republican hold | | | |

=== District 28 ===
28th District General Election
| Party | Candidate | Votes | % |
|---|---|---|---|
| Republican | Ashley Trantham (incumbent) | 11,804 | 97.30 |
| Write-in | | 328 | 2.70 |
| Total votes | | 12,132 | 100.0 |
| Republican hold | | | |

=== District 29 ===
29th District General Election
| Party | Candidate | Votes | % |
|---|---|---|---|
| Republican | Dennis Moss (incumbent) | 9,711 | 98.59 |
| Write-in | | 139 | 1.41 |
| Total votes | | 9,850 | 100.0 |
| Republican hold | | | |

=== District 30 ===
30th District General Election
| Party | Candidate | Votes | % |
|---|---|---|---|
| Republican | Steve Moss (incumbent) | 8,550 | 98.86 |
| Write-in | | 99 | 1.14 |
| Total votes | | 8,649 | 100.0 |
| Republican hold | | | |

=== District 31 ===
31st District General Election
| Party | Candidate | Votes | % |
|---|---|---|---|
| Democratic | Rosalyn Henderson-Myers (incumbent) | 6,598 | 98.85 |
| Write-in | | 77 | 1.15 |
| Total votes | | 6,675 | 100.0 |
| Democratic hold | | | |

=== District 32 ===
32nd District General Election
| Party | Candidate | Votes | % |
|---|---|---|---|
| Republican | Max Hyde | 10,239 | 98.12 |
| Write-in | | 196 | 1.88 |
| Total votes | | 10,435 | 100.0 |
| Republican hold | | | |

=== District 33 ===
33rd District General Election
| Party | Candidate | Votes | % |
|---|---|---|---|
| Republican | Eddie Tallon (incumbent) | 10,378 | 98.48 |
| Write-in | | 160 | 1.52 |
| Total votes | | 10,538 | 100.0 |
| Republican hold | | | |

=== District 34 ===
34th District General Election
| Party | Candidate | Votes | % |
|---|---|---|---|
| Republican | Mike Forrester (incumbent) | 9,668 | 97.28 |
| Write-in | | 270 | 2.72 |
| Total votes | | 9,938 | 100.0 |
| Republican hold | | | |

=== District 35 ===
35th District General Election
| Party | Candidate | Votes | % |
|---|---|---|---|
| Republican | Bill Chumley (incumbent) | 11,437 | 65.20 |
| Democratic | Helen Pendarvis | 6,071 | 34.61 |
| Write-in | | 33 | 0.19 |
| Total votes | | 17,541 | 100.0 |
| Republican hold | | | |

=== District 36 ===
36th District General Election
| Party | Candidate | Votes | % |
|---|---|---|---|
| Republican | Rita Allison (incumbent) | 8,790 | 97.59 |
| Write-in | | 217 | 2.41 |
| Total votes | | 9,007 | 100.0 |
| Republican hold | | | |

=== District 37 ===
37th District General Election
| Party | Candidate | Votes | % |
|---|---|---|---|
| Republican | Steven Long (incumbent) | 8,733 | 97.44 |
| Write-in | | 229 | 2.56 |
| Total votes | | 8,962 | 100.0 |
| Republican hold | | | |

=== District 38 ===
38th District General Election
| Party | Candidate | Votes | % |
|---|---|---|---|
| Republican | Josiah Magnuson (incumbent) | 11,106 | 98.04 |
| Write-in | | 222 | 1.96 |
| Total votes | | 11,328 | 100.0 |
| Republican hold | | | |

=== District 39 ===
39th District General Election
| Party | Candidate | Votes | % |
|---|---|---|---|
| Republican | Cal Forrest (incumbent) | 10,424 | 98.90 |
| Write-in | | 116 | 1.10 |
| Total votes | | 10,540 | 100.0 |
| Republican hold | | | |

=== District 40 ===
40th District General Election
| Party | Candidate | Votes | % |
|---|---|---|---|
| Republican | Richard Martin (incumbent) | 9,212 | 98.17 |
| Write-in | | 172 | 1.83 |
| Total votes | | 9,384 | 100.0 |
| Republican hold | | | |

=== District 41 ===
41st District General Election
| Party | Candidate | Votes | % |
|---|---|---|---|
| Democratic | Annie McDaniel | 9,630 | 78.15 |
| United Citizens | Fred Kennedy | 2,593 | 21.04 |
| Write-in | | 99 | 0.80 |
| Total votes | | 12,322 | 100.0 |
| Democratic hold | | | |

=== District 42 ===
42nd District General Election
| Party | Candidate | Votes | % |
|---|---|---|---|
| Republican | Doug Gilliam | 8,074 | 98.21 |
| Write-in | | 147 | 1.79 |
| Total votes | | 8,221 | 100.0 |
| Republican gain from Democratic | | | |

=== District 43 ===
43rd District General Election
| Party | Candidate | Votes | % |
|---|---|---|---|
| Republican | Randy Ligon | 8,247 | 65.75 |
| Democratic | Tom Hawk | 4,293 | 34.23 |
| Write-in | | 3 | 0.02 |
| Total votes | | 12,543 | 100.0 |
| Republican hold | | | |

=== District 44 ===
44th District General Election
| Party | Candidate | Votes | % |
|---|---|---|---|
| Democratic | Mandy Powers Norrell (incumbent) | 6,903 | 93.32 |
| Write-in | | 494 | 6.68 |
| Total votes | | 7,397 | 100.0 |
| Democratic hold | | | |

=== District 45 ===
45th District General Election
| Party | Candidate | Votes | % |
|---|---|---|---|
| Republican | Brandon Newton (incumbent) | 15,125 | 62.47 |
| TOTAL | Corin Buskey | 9,075 | 37.48 |
| Democratic | Corin Buskey | 8,729 | 36.05 |
| Working Families | Corin Buskey | 346 | 1.43 |
| Write-in | | 13 | 0.05 |
| Total votes | | 24,213 | 100.0 |
| Republican hold | | | |

=== District 46 ===
46th District General Election
| Party | Candidate | Votes | % |
|---|---|---|---|
| Republican | Gary Simrill (incumbent) | 9,395 | 60.56 |
| Democratic | Carl Kenny Dicks | 6,104 | 39.35 |
| Write-in | | 14 | 0.09 |
| Total votes | | 15,513 | 100.0 |
| Republican hold | | | |

=== District 47 ===
47th District General Election
| Party | Candidate | Votes | % |
|---|---|---|---|
| Republican | Tommy Pope (incumbent) | 10,894 | 71.57 |
| Democratic | Marty R. Cotton | 4,315 | 28.35 |
| Write-in | | 12 | 0.08 |
| Total votes | | 15,221 | 100.0 |
| Republican hold | | | |

=== District 48 ===
48th District General Election
| Party | Candidate | Votes | % |
|---|---|---|---|
| Republican | Bruce M. Bryant (incumbent) | 10,504 | 60.79 |
| Democratic | Vickie Holt | 6,764 | 39.15 |
| Write-in | | 11 | 0.06 |
| Total votes | | 17,279 | 100.0 |
| Republican hold | | | |

=== District 49 ===
49th District General Election
| Party | Candidate | Votes | % |
|---|---|---|---|
| Democratic | John R. King (incumbent) | 7,830 | 75.54 |
| Working Families | John R. King (incumbent) | 597 | 5.76 |
| TOTAL | John R. King (incumbent) | 8,427 | 81.3 |
| American | Johnny Walker | 1,886 | 18.20 |
| Write-in | | 52 | 0.50 |
| Total votes | | 10,365 | 100.0 |
| Democratic hold | | | |

=== District 50 ===
50th District General Election
| Party | Candidate | Votes | % |
|---|---|---|---|
| Democratic | Will Wheeler (incumbent) | 9,139 | 98.51 |
| Write-in | | 138 | 1.49 |
| Total votes | | 9,277 | 100.0 |
| Democratic hold | | | |

=== District 51 ===
51st District General Election
| Party | Candidate | Votes | % |
|---|---|---|---|
| Democratic | David Weeks (incumbent) | 8,758 | 99.01 |
| Write-in | | 88 | 0.99 |
| Total votes | | 8,846 | 100.0 |
| Democratic hold | | | |

=== District 52 ===
52nd District General Election
| Party | Candidate | Votes | % |
|---|---|---|---|
| Democratic | Laurie Slade Funderburk (incumbent) | 9,017 | 57.41 |
| Republican | Penry Gustafson | 6,672 | 42.48 |
| Write-in | | 18 | 0.11 |
| Total votes | | 15,707 | 100.0 |
| Democratic hold | | | |

=== District 53 ===
53rd District General Election
| Party | Candidate | Votes | % |
|---|---|---|---|
| Republican | Richie Yow (incumbent) | 6,521 | 98.37 |
| Write-in | | 108 | 1.63 |
| Total votes | | 6,629 | 100.0 |
| Republican hold | | | |

=== District 54 ===
54th District General Election
| Party | Candidate | Votes | % |
|---|---|---|---|
| Democratic | Patricia "Pat" Moore Henegan (incumbent) | 7,189 | 97.80 |
| Write-in | | 162 | 2.20 |
| Total votes | | 7,351 | 100.0 |
| Democratic hold | | | |

=== District 55 ===
55th District General Election
| Party | Candidate | Votes | % |
|---|---|---|---|
| Democratic | Jackie E. Hayes (incumbent) | 6,758 | 97.04 |
| Write-in | | 206 | 2.96 |
| Total votes | | 6,964 | 100.0 |
| Democratic hold | | | |

=== District 56 ===
56th District General Election
| Party | Candidate | Votes | % |
|---|---|---|---|
| Republican | Tim McGinnis (incumbent) | 10,984 | 97.59 |
| Write-in | | 271 | 2.41 |
| Total votes | | 11,255 | 100.0 |
| Republican hold | | | |

=== District 57 ===
57th District General Election
| Party | Candidate | Votes | % |
|---|---|---|---|
| Democratic | Lucas Atkinson (incumbent) | 8,946 | 98.98 |
| Write-in | | 92 | 1.02 |
| Total votes | | 9,038 | 100.0 |
| Democratic hold | | | |

=== District 58 ===
58th District General Election
| Party | Candidate | Votes | % |
|---|---|---|---|
| Republican | Jeff Johnson (incumbent) | 9,580 | 98.65 |
| Write-in | | 131 | 1.35 |
| Total votes | | 9,711 | 100.0 |
| Republican hold | | | |

=== District 59 ===
59th District General Election
| Party | Candidate | Votes | % |
|---|---|---|---|
| Democratic | Terry Alexander (incumbent) | 9,064 | 98.31 |
| Write-in | | 156 | 1.69 |
| Total votes | | 9,220 | 100.0 |
| Democratic hold | | | |

=== District 60 ===
60th District General Election
| Party | Candidate | Votes | % |
|---|---|---|---|
| Republican | Phillip Lowe (incumbent) | 7,548 | 61.11 |
| Democratic | Devon Justin Long | 4,794 | 38.81 |
| Write-in | | 10 | 0.08 |
| Total votes | | 12,352 | 100.0 |
| Republican hold | | | |

=== District 61 ===
61st District General Election
| Party | Candidate | Votes | % |
|---|---|---|---|
| Democratic | Roger K. Kirby (incumbent) | 7,246 | 98.54 |
| Write-in | | 107 | 1.46 |
| Total votes | | 7,246 | 100.0 |
| Democratic hold | | | |

=== District 62 ===
62nd District General Election
| Party | Candidate | Votes | % |
|---|---|---|---|
| Democratic | Robert Williams (incumbent) | 7,821 | 63.12 |
| Republican | Billy Baldwin | 4,555 | 36.76 |
| Write-in | | 15 | 0.15 |
| Total votes | | 12,391 | 100.0 |
| Democratic hold | | | |

=== District 63 ===
63rd District General Election
| Party | Candidate | Votes | % |
|---|---|---|---|
| Republican | Jay Jordan (incumbent) | 9,171 | 64.60 |
| Democratic | Mike Brank | 5,016 | 35.33 |
| Write-in | | 9 | 0.06 |
| Total votes | | 14,196 | 100.0 |
| Republican hold | | | |

=== District 64 ===
64th District General Election
| Party | Candidate | Votes | % |
|---|---|---|---|
| Democratic | Robert L. Ridgeway III (incumbent) | 9,665 | 98.70 |
| Write-in | | 127 | 1.30 |
| Total votes | | 9,792 | 100.0 |
| Democratic hold | | | |

=== District 65 ===
65th District General Election
| Party | Candidate | Votes | % |
|---|---|---|---|
| Republican | Jay Lucas (incumbent) | 8,962 | 98.83 |
| Write-in | | 106 | 1.17 |
| Total votes | | 9,068 | 100.0 |
| Republican hold | | | |

=== District 66 ===
66th District General Election
| Party | Candidate | Votes | % |
|---|---|---|---|
| Democratic | Gilda Cobb-Hunter (incumbent) | 8,800 | 71.53 |
| Republican | Tom Connor | 3,497 | 28.42 |
| Write-in | | 6 | 0.05 |
| Total votes | | 12,303 | 100.0 |
| Democratic hold | | | |

=== District 67 ===
67th District General Election
| Party | Candidate | Votes | % |
|---|---|---|---|
| Republican | Murrell "George" Smith (incumbent) | 8,640 | 82.17 |
| Libertarian | Brandon Humphries | 1,811 | 17.22 |
| Write-in | | 64 | 0.61 |
| Total votes | | 10,515 | 100.0 |
| Republican hold | | | |

=== District 68 ===
68th District General Election
| Party | Candidate | Votes | % |
|---|---|---|---|
| Republican | Heather Ammons Crawford (incumbent) | 9,457 | 79.29 |
| Libertarian | Cameron Ventura | 2,408 | 20.19 |
| Write-in | | 62 | 0.52 |
| Total votes | | 11,927 | 100.0 |
| Republican hold | | | |

=== District 69 ===
69th District General Election
| Party | Candidate | Votes | % |
|---|---|---|---|
| Republican | Chris Wooten (incumbent) | 10,587 | 64.69 |
| TOTAL | Beth Ann Rocheleau | 5,330 | 32.56 |
| Democratic | Beth Ann Rocheleau | 5,074 | 31.00 |
| Working Families | Beth Ann Rocheleau | 256 | 1.56 |
| Libertarian | David Morris | 425 | 2.60 |
| Write-in | | 24 | 0.15 |
| Total votes | | 16,366 | 100.0 |
| Republican hold | | | |

=== District 70 ===
70th District General Election
| Party | Candidate | Votes | % |
|---|---|---|---|
| Democratic | Wendy C. Brawley (incumbent) | 9,820 | 98.21 |
| Write-in | | 179 | 1.79 |
| Total votes | | 9,999 | 100.0 |
| Democratic hold | | | |

=== District 71 ===
71st District General Election
| Party | Candidate | Votes | % |
|---|---|---|---|
| Republican | Nathan Ballentine (incumbent) | 13,844 | 97.35 |
| Write-in | | 377 | 2.65 |
| Total votes | | 14,221 | 100.0 |
| Republican hold | | | |

=== District 72 ===
72nd District General Election
| Party | Candidate | Votes | % |
|---|---|---|---|
| Democratic | Seth Rose | 7,301 | 98.66 |
| Write-in | | 99 | 1.34 |
| Total votes | | 7,400 | 100.0 |
| Democratic hold | | | |

=== District 73 ===
73rd District General Election
| Party | Candidate | Votes | % |
|---|---|---|---|
| Democratic | Chris Hart (incumbent) | 8,900 | 77.95 |
| Republican | Ralph Bell | 2,513 | 22.01 |
| Write-in | | 5 | 0.04 |
| Total votes | | 11,418 | 100.0 |
| Democratic hold | | | |

=== District 74 ===
74th District General Election
| Party | Candidate | Votes | % |
|---|---|---|---|
| Democratic | J. Todd Rutherford (incumbent) | 9,681 | 90.05 |
| United Citizens | Michael L. Block | 1,018 | 9.47 |
| Write-in | | 52 | 0.48 |
| Total votes | | 10,751 | 100.0 |
| Democratic hold | | | |

=== District 75 ===
75th District General Election
| Party | Candidate | Votes | % |
|---|---|---|---|
| Republican | Kirkman Finlay III (incumbent) | 7,842 | 57.48 |
| TOTAL | John Crangle | 5,780 | 42.37 |
| Democratic | John Crangle | 5,594 | 41.01 |
| American | John Crangle | 186 | 1.36 |
| Write-in | | 20 | 0.15 |
| Total votes | | 13,642 | 100.0 |
| Republican hold | | | |

=== District 76 ===
76th District General Election
| Party | Candidate | Votes | % |
|---|---|---|---|
| Democratic | Leon Howard (incumbent) | 10,639 | 100.0 |
| Write-in | | 88 | 0.82 |
| Total votes | | 10,727 | 99.18 |
| Democratic hold | | | |

=== District 77 ===
77th District General Election
| Party | Candidate | Votes | % |
|---|---|---|---|
| Democratic | Kambrell Garvin | 14,056 | 84.75 |
| Libertarian | Justin Bishop | 2,445 | 14.74 |
| Write-in | | 85 | 0.51 |
| Total votes | | 16,586 | 100.0 |
| Democratic hold | | | |

=== District 78 ===
78th District General Election
| Party | Candidate | Votes | % |
|---|---|---|---|
| Democratic | Beth Bernstein (incumbent) | 10,178 | 97.87 |
| Write-in | | 222 | 2.13 |
| Total votes | | 10,400 | 100.0 |
| Democratic hold | | | |

=== District 79 ===
79th District General Election
| Party | Candidate | Votes | % |
|---|---|---|---|
| Democratic | Ivory Thigpen (incumbent) | 13,307 | 87.82 |
| Libertarian | Victor Kocher | 1,782 | 11.76 |
| Write-in | | 63 | 0.43 |
| Total votes | | 15,152 | 100.0 |
| Democratic hold | | | |

=== District 80 ===
80th District General Election
| Party | Candidate | Votes | % |
|---|---|---|---|
| Democratic | Jimmy Bales (incumbent) | 9,722 | 97.94 |
| Write-in | | 204 | 2.06 |
| Total votes | | 9,926 | 100.0 |
| Democratic hold | | | |

=== District 81 ===
81st District General Election
| Party | Candidate | Votes | % |
|---|---|---|---|
| Republican | Bart Blackwell (incumbent) | 11,342 | 62.95 |
| TOTAL | Elise Fox | 6,667 | 37.0 |
| Democratic | Elise Fox | 6,317 | 35.06 |
| Working Families | Elise Fox | 350 | 1.94 |
| Write-in | | 8 | 0.04 |
| Total votes | | 18,017 | 100.0 |
| Republican hold | | | |

=== District 82 ===
82nd District General Election
| Party | Candidate | Votes | % |
|---|---|---|---|
| Democratic | William "Bill" Clyburn, Sr. (incumbent) | 8,041 | 96.69 |
| Write-in | | 275 | 3.31 |
| Total votes | | 8,316 | 100.0 |
| Democratic hold | | | |

=== District 83 ===
83rd District General Election
| Party | Candidate | Votes | % |
|---|---|---|---|
| Republican | Bill Hixon (incumbent) | 10,414 | 80.44 |
| Libertarian | David Weikle | 2,431 | 18.78 |
| Write-in | | 102 | 0.79 |
| Total votes | | 12,947 | 100.0 |
| Republican hold | | | |

=== District 84 ===
84th District General Election
| Party | Candidate | Votes | % |
|---|---|---|---|
| Republican | Ronnie Young (incumbent) | 8,270 | 64.76 |
| Democratic | Jennifer Cook Lariscey | 4,487 | 35.13 |
| Write-in | | 14 | 0.11 |
| Total votes | | 12,771 | 100.0 |
| Republican hold | | | |

=== District 85 ===
85th District General Election
| Party | Candidate | Votes | % |
|---|---|---|---|
| Republican | Chip Huggins (incumbent) | 12,206 | 66.01 |
| TOTAL | Sam Edwards | 6,273 | 33.93 |
| Democratic | Sam Edwards | 5,926 | 32.05 |
| Working Families | Sam Edwards | 347 | 1.88 |
| Write-in | | 12 | 0.06 |
| Total votes | | 18,491 | 100.0 |
| Republican hold | | | |

=== District 86 ===
86th District General Election
| Party | Candidate | Votes | % |
|---|---|---|---|
| Republican | Bill Taylor (incumbent) | 9,703 | 97.75 |
| Write-in | | 223 | 2.25 |
| Total votes | | 9,923 | 100.0 |
| Republican hold | | | |

=== District 87 ===
87th District General Election
| Party | Candidate | Votes | % |
|---|---|---|---|
| Republican | Paula Rawl Calhoon | 13,617 | 73.68 |
| Democratic | Diane Summers | 4,832 | 26.15 |
| Write-in | | 32 | 0.17 |
| Total votes | | 18,481 | 100.0 |
| Republican hold | | | |

=== District 88 ===
88th District General Election
| Party | Candidate | Votes | % |
|---|---|---|---|
| Republican | McLain "Mac" Toole (incumbent) | 9,872 | 98.24 |
| Write-in | | 177 | 1.76 |
| Total votes | | 10,049 | 100.0 |
| Republican hold | | | |

=== District 89 ===
89th District General Election
| Party | Candidate | Votes | % |
|---|---|---|---|
| Republican | Micah Caskey (incumbent) | 8,861 | 97.34 |
| Write-in | | 242 | 2.66 |
| Total votes | | 9,103 | 100.0 |
| Republican hold | | | |

=== District 90 ===
90th District General Election
| Party | Candidate | Votes | % |
|---|---|---|---|
| Democratic | Justin Bamberg (incumbent) | 7,146 | 96.54 |
| Write-in | | 256 | 3.46 |
| Total votes | | 7,402 | 100.0 |
| Democratic hold | | | |

=== District 91 ===
91st District General Election
| Party | Candidate | Votes | % |
|---|---|---|---|
| Democratic | Lonnie Hosey (incumbent) | 8,768 | 98.78 |
| Write-in | | 108 | 1.22 |
| Total votes | | 8,876 | 100.0 |
| Democratic hold | | | |

=== District 92 ===
92nd District General Election
| Party | Candidate | Votes | % |
|---|---|---|---|
| Republican | Joe Daning (incumbent) | 8,874 | 97.03 |
| Write-in | | 272 | 2.97 |
| Total votes | | 9,146 | 100.0 |
| Republican hold | | | |

=== District 93 ===
93rd District General Election
| Party | Candidate | Votes | % |
|---|---|---|---|
| Democratic | Russell L. Ott (incumbent) | 8,507 | 65.99 |
| Republican | Terry L. Kiser, Sr. | 4,381 | 33.98 |
| Write-in | | 4 | 0.03 |
| Total votes | | 12,892 | 100.0 |
| Democratic hold | | | |

=== District 94 ===
94th District General Election
| Party | Candidate | Votes | % |
|---|---|---|---|
| Republican | Con Chellis | 8,458 | 62.93 |
| Democratic | Damian Daly | 4,968 | 36.96 |
| Write-in | | 14 | 0.10 |
| Total votes | | 13,440 | 100.0 |
| Republican hold | | | |

=== District 95 ===
95th District General Election
| Party | Candidate | Votes | % |
|---|---|---|---|
| Democratic | Jerry Govan (incumbent) | 8,602 | 72.48 |
| Republican | Chester D. Palmer | 3,258 | 27.45 |
| Write-in | | 8 | 0.07 |
| Total votes | | 11,868 | 100.0 |
| Democratic hold | | | |

=== District 96 ===
96th District General Election
| Party | Candidate | Votes | % |
|---|---|---|---|
| Republican | Kit Spires (incumbent) | 7,040 | 71.73 |
| Democratic | Bob Vanlue | 2,754 | 28.06 |
| Write-in | | 20 | 0.20 |
| Total votes | | 9,814 | 100.0 |
| Republican hold | | | |

=== District 97 ===
97th District General Election
| Party | Candidate | Votes | % |
|---|---|---|---|
| Republican | Mandy W. Kimmons | 7,746 | 53.86 |
| Democratic | Patsy G. Knight (incumbent) | 6,629 | 46.10 |
| Write-in | | 6 | 0.04 |
| Total votes | | 14,381 | 100.0 |
| Republican gain from Democratic | | | |

=== District 98 ===
98th District General Election
| Party | Candidate | Votes | % |
|---|---|---|---|
| Republican | Chris Murphy (incumbent) | 9,179 | 96.12 |
| Write-in | | 371 | 3.88 |
| Total votes | | 9,550 | 100.0 |
| Republican hold | | | |

=== District 99 ===
99th District General Election
| Party | Candidate | Votes | % |
|---|---|---|---|
| Republican | Nancy Mace (incumbent) | 10,836 | 60.97 |
| TOTAL | Jen Gibson | 6,927 | 38.98 |
| Democratic | Jen Gibson | 6,590 | 37.08 |
| Working Families | Jen Gibson | 337 | 1.90 |
| Write-in | | 9 | 0.05 |
| Total votes | | 17,772 | 100.0 |
| Republican hold | | | |

=== District 100 ===
100th District General Election
| Party | Candidate | Votes | % |
|---|---|---|---|
| Republican | Sylleste H. Davis (incumbent) | 10,809 | 62.52 |
| Democratic | Michael W. Yates | 6,353 | 36.75 |
| Write-in | | 127 | 0.73 |
| Total votes | | 17,289 | 100.0 |
| Republican hold | | | |

=== District 101 ===
101st District General Election
| Party | Candidate | Votes | % |
|---|---|---|---|
| Democratic | Cezar McKnight (incumbent) | 8,759 | 96.40 |
| Write-in | | 327 | 3.60 |
| Total votes | | 9,086 | 100.0 |
| Democratic hold | | | |

=== District 102 ===
102nd District General Election
| Party | Candidate | Votes | % |
|---|---|---|---|
| Democratic | Joe Jefferson (incumbent) | 7,480 | 60.92 |
| Republican | Terry Hardesty | 4,788 | 38.99 |
| Write-in | | 11 | 0.09 |
| Total votes | | 12,279 | 100.0 |
| Democratic hold | | | |

=== District 103 ===
103rd District General Election
| Party | Candidate | Votes | % |
|---|---|---|---|
| Democratic | Carl L. Anderson (incumbent) | 9,078 | 98.27 |
| Write-in | | 160 | 1.73 |
| Total votes | | 9,238 | 100.0 |
| Democratic hold | | | |

=== District 104 ===
104th District General Election
| Party | Candidate | Votes | % |
|---|---|---|---|
| Republican | William Bailey | 14,859 | 98.38 |
| Write-in | | 244 | 1.62 |
| Total votes | | 15,103 | 100.0 |
| Republican hold | | | |

=== District 105 ===
105th District General Election
| Party | Candidate | Votes | % |
|---|---|---|---|
| Republican | Kevin Hardee (incumbent) | 8,965 | 97.99 |
| Write-in | | 184 | 2.01 |
| Total votes | | 9,149 | 100.0 |
| Republican hold | | | |

=== District 106 ===
106th District General Election
| Party | Candidate | Votes | % |
|---|---|---|---|
| Republican | Russell Fry (incumbent) | 13,198 | 68.38 |
| TOTAL | Robin Gause | 6,088 | 31.54 |
| Democratic | Robin Gause | 5,779 | 29.94 |
| Working Families | Robin Gause | 182 | 0.94 |
| American | Robin Gause | 127 | 0.66 |
| Write-in | | 14 | 0.07 |
| Total votes | | 19,300 | 100.0 |
| Republican hold | | | |

=== District 107 ===
107th District General Election
| Party | Candidate | Votes | % |
|---|---|---|---|
| Republican | Alan Clemmons (incumbent) | 10,617 | 97.49 |
| Write-in | | 273 | 2.51 |
| Total votes | | 10,890 | 100.0 |
| Republican hold | | | |

=== District 108 ===
108th District General Election
| Party | Candidate | Votes | % |
|---|---|---|---|
| Republican | Lee Hewitt (incumbent) | 14,450 | 98.47 |
| Write-in | | 224 | 1.53 |
| Total votes | | 14,674 | 100.0 |
| Republican hold | | | |

=== District 109 ===
109th District General Election
| Party | Candidate | Votes | % |
|---|---|---|---|
| Democratic | David Mack III (incumbent) | 7,473 | 80.81 |
| Working Families | David Mack III (incumbent) | 616 | 6.66 |
| TOTAL | David Mack III (incumbent) | 8,089 | 87.47 |
| Libertarian | Rodney Travis | 1,129 | 12.21 |
| Write-in | | 30 | 0.35 |
| Total votes | | 9,248 | 100.0 |
| Democratic hold | | | |

=== District 110 ===
110th District General Election
| Party | Candidate | Votes | % |
|---|---|---|---|
| Republican | William S. Cogswell, Jr. (incumbent) | 9,264 | 55.07 |
| Democratic | Ben Pogue | 7,548 | 44.87 |
| Write-in | | 9 | 0.05 |
| Total votes | | 16,821 | 100.0 |
| Republican hold | | | |

=== District 111 ===
111th District General Election
| Party | Candidate | Votes | % |
|---|---|---|---|
| Democratic | Wendell G. Gilliard (incumbent) | 10,011 | 98.43 |
| Write-in | | 460 | 1.57 |
| Total votes | | 10,171 | 100.0 |
| Democratic hold | | | |

=== District 112 ===
112th District General Election
| Party | Candidate | Votes | % |
|---|---|---|---|
| Republican | Mike Sottile (incumbent) | 12,210 | 57.31 |
| TOTAL | Joe Preston | 9,084 | 42.64 |
| Democratic | Joe Preston | 8,712 | 40.89 |
| Working Families | Joe Preston | 372 | 1.75 |
| Write-in | | 13 | 0.06 |
| Total votes | | 21,307 | 100.0 |
| Republican hold | | | |

=== District 113 ===
113th District General Election
| Party | Candidate | Votes | % |
|---|---|---|---|
| Democratic | Marvin R. Pendarvis (incumbent) | 8,256 | 98.49 |
| Write-in | | 127 | 1.51 |
| Total votes | | 8,383 | 100.0 |
| Democratic hold | | | |

=== District 114 ===
114th District General Election
| Party | Candidate | Votes | % |
|---|---|---|---|
| Republican | Lin Bennett (incumbent) | 8,619 | 52.52 |
| Democratic | Dan P. Jones | 7,153 | 43.59 |
| Libertarian | Melissa Couture | 633 | 3.86 |
| Write-in | | 6 | 0.04 |
| Total votes | | 16,411 | 100.0 |
| Republican hold | | | |

=== District 115 ===
115th District General Election
| Party | Candidate | Votes | % |
|---|---|---|---|
| Republican | Peter McCoy (incumbent) | 9,727 | 51.45 |
| TOTAL | Carol Tempel | 9,173 | 48.52 |
| Democratic | Carol Tempel | 8,776 | 46.42 |
| Working Families | Carol Tempel | 397 | 2.10 |
| Write-in | | 6 | 0.03 |
| Total votes | | 18,906 | 100.0 |
| Republican hold | | | |

=== District 116 ===
116th District General Election
| Party | Candidate | Votes | % |
|---|---|---|---|
| Democratic | Robert L. Brown (incumbent) | 8,699 | 54.04 |
| Working Families | Robert L. Brown (incumbent) | 329 | 2.04 |
| TOTAL | Robert L. Brown (incumbent) | 9,028 | 56.08 |
| Republican | Carroll O'Neal | 7,065 | 4389 |
| Write-in | | 4 | 0.02 |
| Total votes | | 16,097 | 100.0 |
| Democratic hold | | | |

=== District 117 ===
117th District General Election
| Party | Candidate | Votes | % |
|---|---|---|---|
| Democratic | Krystle Matthews | 5,577 | 53.45 |
| Republican | Bill Crosby (incumbent) | 4,842 | 46.41 |
| Write-in | | 15 | 0.14 |
| Total votes | | 10,434 | 100.0 |
| Democratic gain from Republican | | | |

=== District 118 ===
118th District General Election
| Party | Candidate | Votes | % |
|---|---|---|---|
| Republican | Bill Herbkersman (incumbent) | 12,175 | 97.98 |
| Write-in | | 251 | 2.02 |
| Total votes | | 12,426 | 100.0 |
| Republican hold | | | |

=== District 119 ===
119th District General Election
| Party | Candidate | Votes | % |
|---|---|---|---|
| Democratic | Leonidas "Leon" Stavrinakis (incumbent) | 11,172 | 64.98 |
| Republican | Paul Sizemore | 6,011 | 34.96 |
| Write-in | | 11 | 0.06 |
| Total votes | | 17,194 | 100.0 |
| Democratic hold | | | |

=== District 120 ===
120th District General Election
| Party | Candidate | Votes | % |
|---|---|---|---|
| Republican | Weston Newton (incumbent) | 10,806 | 64.12 |
| Democratic | Ryan Martz | 6,039 | 35.83 |
| Write-in | | 8 | 0.05 |
| Total votes | | 16,853 | 100.0 |
| Republican hold | | | |

=== District 121 ===
121st District General Election
| Party | Candidate | Votes | % |
|---|---|---|---|
| Democratic | Michael F. Rivers, Sr. (incumbent) | 9,440 | 97.92 |
| Write-in | | 201 | 2.08 |
| Total votes | | 9,641 | 100.0 |
| Democratic hold | | | |

=== District 122 ===
122nd District General Election
| Party | Candidate | Votes | % |
|---|---|---|---|
| Democratic | Shedron Williams | 7,509 | 80.70 |
| Write-in | | 1796 | 19.30 |
| Total votes | | 9,305 | 100.0 |
| Democratic hold | | | |

=== District 123 ===
123rd District General Election
| Party | Candidate | Votes | % |
|---|---|---|---|
| Republican | Jeff Bradley (incumbent) | 10,781 | 61.98 |
| Democratic | Mario Martinez | 6,594 | 37.91 |
| Write-in | | 19 | 0.11 |
| Total votes | | 17,394 | 100.0 |
| Republican hold | | | |

=== District 124 ===
124th District General Election
| Party | Candidate | Votes | % |
|---|---|---|---|
| Republican | Shannon Erickson (incumbent) | 10,401 | 97.43 |
| Write-in | | 274 | 2.57 |
| Total votes | | 10,675 | 100.0 |
| Republican hold | | | |

== See also ==
- 2016 South Carolina elections
- 2016 United States House of Representatives elections in South Carolina
