= 2018 South Carolina House of Representatives election =

- November 6, 2018

All 124 seats in the South Carolina House of Representatives 63 seats needed for a majority
- Turnout: 55.03%
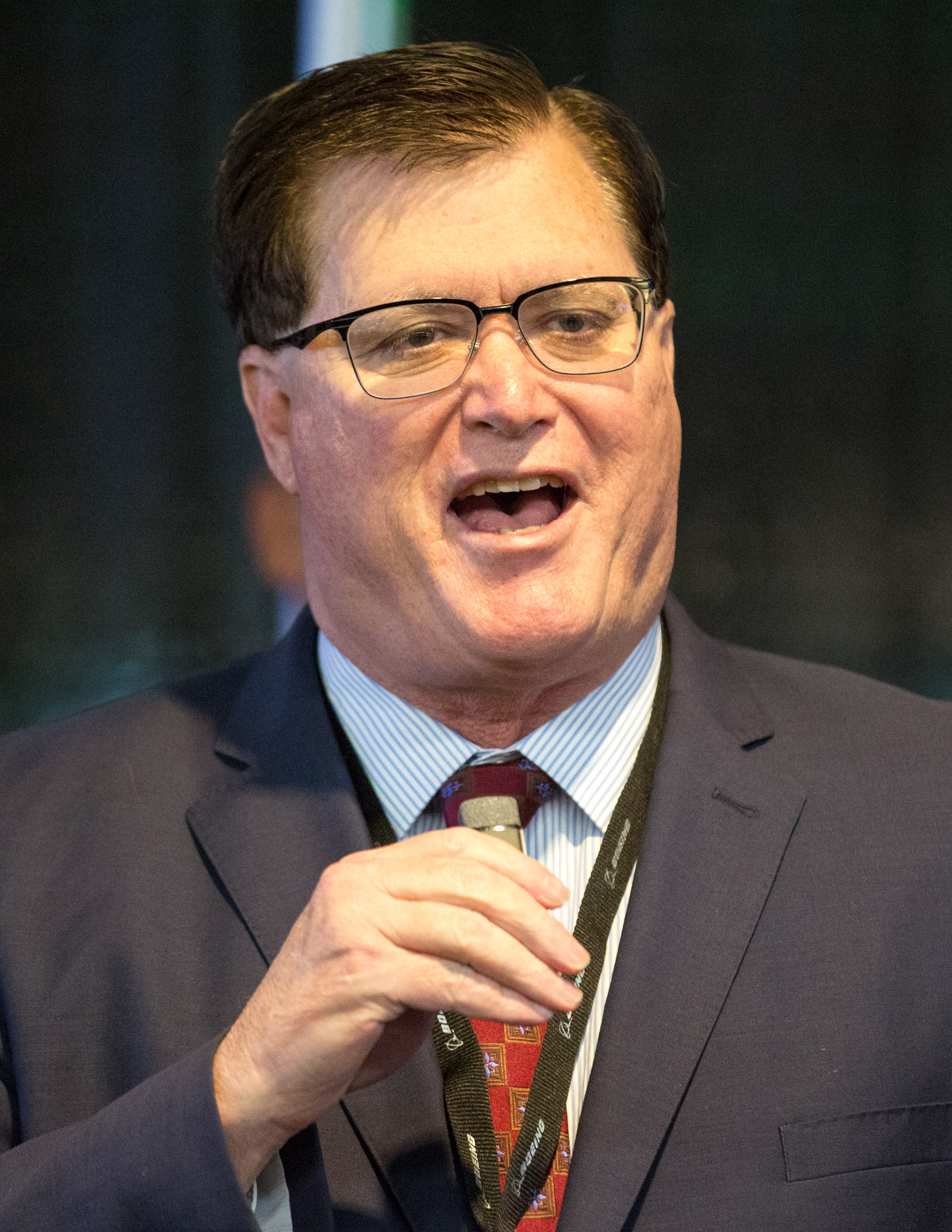

	Majority party	Minority party
Leader	Jay Lucas	J. Todd Rutherford
Party	Republican	Democratic
Leader since	December 2, 2014	January 8, 2013
Leader's seat	121st	101st
Last election	80	44
Seats won	80	44
Seat change	Steady	Steady
Popular vote	869,238	572,739
Percentage	58.48%	38.53%
Swing	▼4.73%	▲3.57%
- Results: Democratic hold Democratic gain Republican hold Republican gain
Speaker before election
Jay Lucas
Republican
Elected Speaker
Jay Lucas
Republican

The 2018 South Carolina House of Representatives elections took place as part of the biennial United States elections. South Carolina voters elected state representatives in all 124 of the state house's districts. State representatives serve two-year terms in the South Carolina State House. A statewide map of South Carolina's state House districts can be obtained from the South Carolina House's website here, and individual district maps can be obtained from the U.S. Census here.

A primary election on June 12, 2018, and a primary runoff on June 26, 2018, in races in which no candidate received over 50% of his/her party's primary vote, determined which candidates appeared on the November 6 general election ballot. Primary election results can be obtained from the South Carolina Secretary of State's website.

Following the 2016 state house elections, Republicans maintained effective control of the House with 80 members. Democrats held 44 seats following the 2016 elections.

In the 2018 election, although multiple seats flipped between parties, there was no net change. Therefore, Republicans maintained an 80-to-44-seat majority over Democrats.

== Results ==
Party	Votes		Seats		
Party	No.	%	No.	+/−	%
South Carolina Republican Party	869,238	58.48	80	0	64.52
South Carolina Democratic Party	572,739	38.53	44	0	35.48
Write-in	17,271	1.16	0	0	0.00
Libertarian Party of South Carolina	13,064	0.88	0	0	0.00
Working Families Party	4,612	0.31	0	0	0.00
American Party of South Carolina	4,294	0.29	0	0	0.00
United Citizens Party	3,611	0.24	0	0	0.00
Independent	1,648	0.11	0	0	0.00
Total	1,486,477	100.00	124	±0	100.00
Registered voters	3,137,659	100.00			
Turnout	1,486,477	47.38			
Source: South Carolina Election Commission

Popular vote
Republican	58.48%
Democratic	38.53%
Other	2.99%

House seats
Republican	64.52%
Democratic	35.48%

== Predictions ==
Source	Ranking	As of
Governing	Safe R	October 8, 2018

== Summary of results by State House district ==
Election results:

State House district	Incumbent	Party	Elected representative	Party
1st	Bill Whitmire	Republican	Bill Whitmire	Republican
2nd	Bill Sandifer III	Republican	Bill Sandifer III	Republican
3rd	Gary E. Clary	Republican	Gary E. Clary	Republican
4th	Davey Hiott	Republican	Davey Hiott	Republican
5th	Neal Collins	Republican	Neal Collins	Republican
6th	Brian White	Republican	Brian White	Republican
7th	Jay West	Republican	Jay West	Republican
8th	Jonathon Hill	Republican	Jonathon Hill	Republican
9th	Anne Thayer	Republican	Anne Thayer	Republican
10th	Joshua Putnam	Republican	West Cox	Republican
11th	Craig Gagnon	Republican	Craig Gagnon	Republican
12th	J. Anne Parks	Democratic	J. Anne Parks	Democratic
13th	John McCravy	Republican	John McCravy	Republican
14th	Michael Pitts	Republican	Michael Pitts	Republican
15th	Samuel Rivers, Jr.	Republican	J.A. Moore	Democratic
16th	Mark Willis	Republican	Mark Willis	Republican
17th	Mike Burns	Republican	Mike Burns	Republican
18th	Tommy Stringer	Republican	Tommy Stringer	Republican
19th	Dwight Loftis	Republican	Dwight Loftis	Republican
20th	Dan Hamilton	Republican	Adam Morgan	Republican
21st	Phyllis Henderson	Republican	Bobby Cox	Republican
22nd	Jason Elliott	Republican	Jason Elliott	Republican
23rd	Chandra Dillard	Democratic	Chandra Dillard	Democratic
24th	Bruce Bannister	Republican	Bruce Bannister	Republican
25th	Leola Robinson-Simpson	Democratic	Leola Robinson-Simpson	Democratic
26th	R. Raye Felder	Republican	R. Raye Felder	Republican
27th	Garry Smith	Republican	Garry Smith	Republican
28th	Ashley Trantham	Republican	Ashley Trantham	Republican
29th	Dennis Moss	Republican	Dennis Moss	Republican
30th	Steve Moss	Republican	Steve Moss	Republican
31st	Rosalyn Henderson Myers	Democratic	Rosalyn Henderson Myers	Democratic
32nd	Derham Cole, Jr.	Republican	Max Hyde	Republican
33rd	Eddie Tallon	Republican	Eddie Tallon	Republican
34th	Mike Forrester	Republican	Mike Forrester	Republican
35th	Bill Chumley	Republican	Bill Chumley	Republican
36th	Merita Ann Allison	Republican	Merita Ann Allison	Republican
37th	Steven Long	Republican	Steven Long	Republican
38th	Josiah Magnuson	Republican	Josiah Magnuson	Republican
39th	Cal Forrest	Republican	Cal Forrest	Republican
40th	Richard Martin	Republican	Richard Martin	Republican
41st	MaryGail Douglas	Democratic	Annie McDaniel	Democratic
42nd	Michael Anthony	Democratic	Doug Gilliam	Republican
43rd	Francis Delleney, Jr.	Republican	Randy Ligon	Republican
44th	Mandy Powers Norrell	Democratic	Mandy Powers Norrell	Democratic
45th	Brandon Newton	Republican	Brandon Newton	Republican
46th	Gary Simrill	Republican	Gary Simrill	Republican
47th	Tommy Pope	Republican	Tommy Pope	Republican
48th	Bruce M. Bryant	Republican	Bruce M. Bryant	Republican
49th	John King	Democratic	John King	Democratic
50th	Will Wheeler	Democratic	Will Wheeler	Democratic
51st	J. David Weeks	Democratic	J. David Weeks	Democratic
52nd	Laurie Funderburk	Democratic	Laurie Funderburk	Democratic
53rd	Richie Yow	Republican	Richie Yow	Republican
54th	Patricia Henegan	Democratic	Patricia Henegan	Democratic
55th	Jackie Hayes	Democratic	Jackie Hayes	Democratic
56th	Tim McGinnis	Republican	Tim McGinnis	Republican
57th	Lucas Atkinson	Democratic	Lucas Atkinson	Democratic
58th	Jeff Johnson	Republican	Jeff Johnson	Republican
59th	Terry Alexander	Democratic	Terry Alexander	Democratic
60th	Phillip Lowe	Republican	Phillip Lowe	Republican
61st	Roger Kirby	Democratic	Roger Kirby	Democratic
62nd	Robert Williams	Democratic	Robert Williams	Democratic
63rd	Jay Jordan	Republican	Jay Jordan	Republican
64th	Robert L. Ridgeway III	Democratic	Robert L. Ridgeway III	Democratic
65th	James "Jay" Lucas	Republican	James "Jay" Lucas	Republican
66th	Gilda Cobb-Hunter	Democratic	Gilda Cobb-Hunter	Democratic
67th	George Smith, Jr.	Republican	George Smith, Jr.	Republican
68th	Heather Ammons Crawford	Republican	Heather Ammons Crawford	Republican
69th	Chris Wooten	Republican	Chris Wooten	Republican
70th	Wendy Brawley	Democratic	Wendy Brawley	Democratic
71st	Nathan Ballentine	Republican	Nathan Ballentine	Republican
72nd	James Smith, Jr.	Democratic	Seth Rose	Democratic
73rd	Christopher Hart	Democratic	Christopher Hart	Democratic
74th	James Rutherford	Democratic	James Rutherford	Democratic
75th	Kirkman Finlay III	Republican	Kirkman Finlay III	Republican
76th	Leon Howard	Democratic	Leon Howard	Democratic
77th	Joseph McEachern	Democratic	Kambrell Garvin	Democratic
78th	Beth Bernstein	Democratic	Beth Bernstein	Democratic
79th	Ivory Thigpen	Democratic	Ivory Thigpen	Democratic
80th	Jimmy Bales	Democratic	Jimmy Bales	Democratic
81st	Bart Blackwell	Republican	Bart Blackwell	Republican
82nd	William Clyburn, Sr.	Democratic	William Clyburn, Sr.	Democratic
83rd	Bill Hixon	Republican	Bill Hixon	Republican
84th	Ronnie Young	Republican	Ronnie Young	Republican
85th	Chip Huggins	Republican	Chip Huggins	Republican
86th	Bill Taylor	Republican	Bill Taylor	Republican
87th	Todd Atwater	Republican	Paula Rawl Calhoon	Republican
88th	McLain Toole	Republican	McLain Toole	Republican
89th	Micah Caskey	Republican	Micah Caskey	Republican
90th	Justin Bamberg	Democratic	Justin Bamberg	Democratic
91st	Lonnie Hosey	Democratic	Lonnie Hosey	Democratic
92nd	Joseph Daning	Republican	Joseph Daning	Republican
93rd	Russell L. Ott	Democratic	Russell L. Ott	Democratic
94th	Katie Arrington	Republican	Con Chellis	Republican
95th	Jerry Govan, Jr.	Democratic	Jerry Govan, Jr.	Democratic
96th	Lawrence Kit Spires	Republican	Lawrence Kit Spires	Republican
97th	Patsy Knight	Democratic	Mandy Kimmons	Republican
98th	Chris Murphy	Republican	Chris Murphy	Republican
99th	Nancy Mace	Republican	Nancy Mace	Republican
100th	Sylleste Davis	Republican	Sylleste Davis	Republican
101st	Cezar McKnight	Democratic	Cezar McKnight	Democratic
102nd	Joseph Jefferson, Jr.	Democratic	Joseph Jefferson, Jr.	Democratic
103rd	Carl Anderson	Democratic	Carl Anderson	Democratic
104th	Greg Duckworth	Republican	William Bailey	Republican
105th	Kevin J. Hardee	Republican	Kevin J. Hardee	Republican
106th	Russell Fry	Republican	Russell Fry	Republican
107th	Alan Clemmons	Republican	Alan Clemmons	Republican
108th	Lee Hewitt	Republican	Lee Hewitt	Republican
109th	David Mack	Democratic	David Mack	Democratic
110th	William S. Cogswell, Jr.	Republican	William S. Cogswell, Jr.	Republican
111th	Wendell Gilliard	Democratic	Wendell Gilliard	Democratic
112th	Mike Sottile	Republican	Mike Sottile	Republican
113th	Marvin Pendarvis	Democratic	Marvin Pendarvis	Democratic
114th	Lin Bennett	Republican	Lin Bennett	Republican
115th	Peter McCoy	Republican	Peter McCoy	Republican
116th	Robert Brown	Democratic	Robert Brown	Democratic
117th	Bill Crosby	Republican	Krystle Matthews	Democratic
118th	Bill Herbkersman	Republican	Bill Herbkersman	Republican
119th	Leonidas Stavrinakis	Democratic	Leonidas Stavrinakis	Democratic
120th	Weston Newton	Republican	Weston Newton	Republican
121st	Michael Rivers	Democratic	Michael Rivers	Democratic
122nd	William Bowers	Democratic	Shedron Williams	Democratic
123rd	Jeff Bradley	Republican	Jeff Bradley	Republican
124th	Shannon Erickson	Republican	Shannon Erickson	Republican

== Detailed results by State House district ==
=== District 1 ===
1st District general election
Party	Candidate	Votes	%
Republican	Bill Whitmire (incumbent)	11,287	98.63
Write-in		157	1.37
Total votes		11,444	100.0
Republican hold			

=== District 2 ===
2nd District general election
Party	Candidate	Votes	%
Republican	Bill Sandifer (incumbent)	9,276	64.11
Democratic	Jody G. Gaulin	5,178	35.79
Write-in		15	0.10
Total votes		14,469	100.0
Republican hold			

=== District 3 ===
3rd District general election
Party	Candidate	Votes	%
Republican	Gary Clary (incumbent)	7,576	97.18
Write-in		220	2.82
Total votes		7,796	100.0
Republican hold			

=== District 4 ===
4th District general election
Party	Candidate	Votes	%
Republican	Davey Hiott (incumbent)	11,883	98.74
Write-in		152	1.26
Total votes		12,035	100.0
Republican hold			

=== District 5 ===
5th District general election
Party	Candidate	Votes	%
Republican	Neal Collins (incumbent)	11,617	97.21
Write-in		334	2.79
Total votes		11,951	100.0
Republican hold			

=== District 6 ===
6th District general election
Party	Candidate	Votes	%
Republican	Brian White (incumbent)	10,243	82.52
American	Ryan Cowsert	2,095	16.88
Write-in		75	0.60
Total votes		12,413	100.0
Republican hold			

=== District 7 ===
7th District general election
Party	Candidate	Votes	%
Republican	Jay West (incumbent)	8,201	98.56
Write-in		120	1.44
Total votes		8,321	100.0
Republican hold			

=== District 8 ===
8th District general election
Party	Candidate	Votes	%
Republican	Jonathon Hill (incumbent)	10,186	98.15
Write-in		192	1.85
Total votes		10,378	100.0
Republican hold			

=== District 9 ===
9th District general election
Party	Candidate	Votes	%
Republican	Anne Thayer (incumbent)	9,165	97.89
Write-in		198	2.11
Total votes		9,363	100.0
Republican hold			

=== District 10 ===
10th District general election
Party	Candidate	Votes	%
Republican	West Cox	10,471	76.63
Democratic	Lucy Hoffman	3,190	23.35
Write-in		3	0.02
Total votes		13,664	100.0
Republican hold			

=== District 11 ===
11th District general election
Party	Candidate	Votes	%
Republican	Craig A. Gagnon (incumbent)	7,292	65.50
Democratic	Devon D. Smith	3,832	34.42
Write-in		9	0.08
Total votes		11,133	100.0
Republican hold			

=== District 12 ===
12th District general election
Party	Candidate	Votes	%
Democratic	Anne Parks (incumbent)	7,256	96.70
Write-in		248	3.30
Total votes		7,504	100.0
Democratic hold			

=== District 13 ===
13th District general election
Party	Candidate	Votes	%
Republican	John McCravy (incumbent)	10,353	71.55
Democratic	Michael Gaskin	4,109	28.40
Write-in		7	0.05
Total votes		14,469	100.0
Republican hold			

=== District 14 ===
14th District general election
Party	Candidate	Votes	%
Republican	Mike Pitts (incumbent)	10,356	97.86
Write-in		226	2.14
Total votes		10,582	100.0
Republican hold			

=== District 15 ===
15th District general election
Party	Candidate	Votes	%
Democratic	J.A. Moore	4,569	49.67
Working Families	J.A. Moore	249	2.71
TOTAL	J.A. Moore	4,818	52.38
Republican	Samuel Rivers, Jr. (incumbent)	4,372	47.53
Write-in		9	0.10
Total votes		9,199	100.0
Democratic gain from Republican			

=== District 16 ===
16th District general election
Party	Candidate	Votes	%
Republican	Mark Willis (incumbent)	9,259	97.11
Write-in		276	2.89
Total votes		9,535	100.0
Republican hold			

=== District 17 ===
17th District general election
Party	Candidate	Votes	%
Republican	Mike Burns (incumbent)	11,598	76.03
Democratic	Judi Buckley	3,641	23.87
Write-in		15	0.10
Total votes		15,254	100.0
Republican hold			

=== District 18 ===
18th District general election
Party	Candidate	Votes	%
Republican	Tommy Stringer (incumbent)	12,110	97.96
Write-in		252	2.04
Total votes		12,362	100.0
Republican hold			

=== District 19 ===
19th District general election
Party	Candidate	Votes	%
Republican	Dwight Loftis (incumbent)	6,744	61.16
TOTAL	Carrie Counton	4,272	38.74
Democratic	Carrie Counton	4,038	36.62
Working Families	Carrie Counton	234	2.12
Write-in		10	0.09
Total votes		11,026	100.0
Republican hold			

=== District 20 ===
20th District general election
Party	Candidate	Votes	%
Republican	Adam Morgan	12,234	97.61
Write-in		299	2.39
Total votes		12,533	100.0
Republican hold			

=== District 21 ===
21st District general election
Party	Candidate	Votes	%
Republican	Bobby Cox	13,826	97.93
Write-in		292	2.07
Total votes		14,118	100.0
Republican hold			

=== District 22 ===
22nd District general election
Party	Candidate	Votes	%
Republican	Jason Elliott (incumbent)	9,955	63.35
Democratic	B.K. Brown	5,673	36.10
Write-in		86	0.55
Total votes		15,714	100.0
Republican hold			

=== District 23 ===
23rd District general election
Party	Candidate	Votes	%
Democratic	Chandra Dillard (incumbent)	7,728	97.72
Write-in		180	2.28
Total votes		7,908	100.0
Democratic hold			

=== District 24 ===
24th District general election
Party	Candidate	Votes	%
Republican	Bruce Bannister (incumbent)	12,992	97.03
Write-in		398	2.97
Total votes		13,390	100.0
Republican hold			

=== District 25 ===
25th District general election
Party	Candidate	Votes	%
Democratic	Leola Robinson-Simpson (incumbent)	7,623	81.57
Independent	Tony Boyce	1,648	17.64
Write-in		74	0.79
Total votes		9,345	100.0
Democratic hold			

=== District 26 ===
26th District general election
Party	Candidate	Votes	%
Republican	Raye Felder (incumbent)	10,940	57.12
Democratic	John Kraljevich	8,205	42.84
Write-in		9	0.05
Total votes		19,154	100.0
Republican hold			

=== District 27 ===
27th District general election
Party	Candidate	Votes	%
Republican	Garry R. Smith (incumbent)	10,994	96.74
Write-in		371	3.26
Total votes		11,365	100.0
Republican hold			

=== District 28 ===
28th District general election
Party	Candidate	Votes	%
Republican	Ashley Trantham (incumbent)	11,804	97.30
Write-in		328	2.70
Total votes		12,132	100.0
Republican hold			

=== District 29 ===
29th District general election
Party	Candidate	Votes	%
Republican	Dennis Moss (incumbent)	9,711	98.59
Write-in		139	1.41
Total votes		9,850	100.0
Republican hold			

=== District 30 ===
30th District general election
Party	Candidate	Votes	%
Republican	Steve Moss (incumbent)	8,550	98.86
Write-in		99	1.14
Total votes		8,649	100.0
Republican hold			

=== District 31 ===
31st District general election
Party	Candidate	Votes	%
Democratic	Rosalyn Henderson-Myers (incumbent)	6,598	98.85
Write-in		77	1.15
Total votes		6,675	100.0
Democratic hold			

=== District 32 ===
32nd District general election
Party	Candidate	Votes	%
Republican	Max Hyde	10,239	98.12
Write-in		196	1.88
Total votes		10,435	100.0
Republican hold			

=== District 33 ===
33rd District general election
Party	Candidate	Votes	%
Republican	Eddie Tallon (incumbent)	10,378	98.48
Write-in		160	1.52
Total votes		10,538	100.0
Republican hold			

=== District 34 ===
34th District general election
Party	Candidate	Votes	%
Republican	Mike Forrester (incumbent)	9,668	97.28
Write-in		270	2.72
Total votes		9,938	100.0
Republican hold			

=== District 35 ===
35th District general election
Party	Candidate	Votes	%
Republican	Bill Chumley (incumbent)	11,437	65.20
Democratic	Helen Pendarvis	6,071	34.61
Write-in		33	0.19
Total votes		17,541	100.0
Republican hold			

=== District 36 ===
36th District general election
Party	Candidate	Votes	%
Republican	Rita Allison (incumbent)	8,790	97.59
Write-in		217	2.41
Total votes		9,007	100.0
Republican hold			

=== District 37 ===
37th District general election
Party	Candidate	Votes	%
Republican	Steven Long (incumbent)	8,733	97.44
Write-in		229	2.56
Total votes		8,962	100.0
Republican hold			

=== District 38 ===
38th District general election
Party	Candidate	Votes	%
Republican	Josiah Magnuson (incumbent)	11,106	98.04
Write-in		222	1.96
Total votes		11,328	100.0
Republican hold			

=== District 39 ===
39th District general election
Party	Candidate	Votes	%
Republican	Cal Forrest (incumbent)	10,424	98.90
Write-in		116	1.10
Total votes		10,540	100.0
Republican hold			

=== District 40 ===
40th District general election
Party	Candidate	Votes	%
Republican	Richard Martin (incumbent)	9,212	98.17
Write-in		172	1.83
Total votes		9,384	100.0
Republican hold			

=== District 41 ===
41st District general election
Party	Candidate	Votes	%
Democratic	Annie McDaniel	9,630	78.15
United Citizens	Fred Kennedy	2,593	21.04
Write-in		99	0.80
Total votes		12,322	100.0
Democratic hold			

=== District 42 ===
42nd District general election
Party	Candidate	Votes	%
Republican	Doug Gilliam	8,074	98.21
Write-in		147	1.79
Total votes		8,221	100.0
Republican gain from Democratic			

=== District 43 ===
43rd District general election
Party	Candidate	Votes	%
Republican	Randy Ligon	8,247	65.75
Democratic	Tom Hawk	4,293	34.23
Write-in		3	0.02
Total votes		12,543	100.0
Republican hold			

=== District 44 ===
44th District general election
Party	Candidate	Votes	%
Democratic	Mandy Powers Norrell (incumbent)	6,903	93.32
Write-in		494	6.68
Total votes		7,397	100.0
Democratic hold			

=== District 45 ===
45th District general election
Party	Candidate	Votes	%
Republican	Brandon Newton (incumbent)	15,125	62.47
TOTAL	Corin Buskey	9,075	37.48
Democratic	Corin Buskey	8,729	36.05
Working Families	Corin Buskey	346	1.43
Write-in		13	0.05
Total votes		24,213	100.0
Republican hold			

=== District 46 ===
46th District general election
Party	Candidate	Votes	%
Republican	Gary Simrill (incumbent)	9,395	60.56
Democratic	Carl Kenny Dicks	6,104	39.35
Write-in		14	0.09
Total votes		15,513	100.0
Republican hold			

=== District 47 ===
47th District general election
Party	Candidate	Votes	%
Republican	Tommy Pope (incumbent)	10,894	71.57
Democratic	Marty R. Cotton	4,315	28.35
Write-in		12	0.08
Total votes		15,221	100.0
Republican hold			

=== District 48 ===
48th District general election
Party	Candidate	Votes	%
Republican	Bruce M. Bryant (incumbent)	10,504	60.79
Democratic	Vickie Holt	6,764	39.15
Write-in		11	0.06
Total votes		17,279	100.0
Republican hold			

=== District 49 ===
49th District general election
Party	Candidate	Votes	%
Democratic	John R. King (incumbent)	7,830	75.54
Working Families	John R. King (incumbent)	597	5.76
TOTAL	John R. King (incumbent)	8,427	81.3
American	Johnny Walker	1,886	18.20
Write-in		52	0.50
Total votes		10,365	100.0
Democratic hold			

=== District 50 ===
50th District general election
Party	Candidate	Votes	%
Democratic	Will Wheeler (incumbent)	9,139	98.51
Write-in		138	1.49
Total votes		9,277	100.0
Democratic hold			

=== District 51 ===
51st District general election
Party	Candidate	Votes	%
Democratic	David Weeks (incumbent)	8,758	99.01
Write-in		88	0.99
Total votes		8,846	100.0
Democratic hold			

=== District 52 ===
52nd District general election
Party	Candidate	Votes	%
Democratic	Laurie Slade Funderburk (incumbent)	9,017	57.41
Republican	Penry Gustafson	6,672	42.48
Write-in		18	0.11
Total votes		15,707	100.0
Democratic hold			

=== District 53 ===
53rd District general election
Party	Candidate	Votes	%
Republican	Richie Yow (incumbent)	6,521	98.37
Write-in		108	1.63
Total votes		6,629	100.0
Republican hold			

=== District 54 ===
54th District general election
Party	Candidate	Votes	%
Democratic	Patricia "Pat" Moore Henegan (incumbent)	7,189	97.80
Write-in		162	2.20
Total votes		7,351	100.0
Democratic hold			

=== District 55 ===
55th District general election
Party	Candidate	Votes	%
Democratic	Jackie E. Hayes (incumbent)	6,758	97.04
Write-in		206	2.96
Total votes		6,964	100.0
Democratic hold			

=== District 56 ===
56th District general election
Party	Candidate	Votes	%
Republican	Tim McGinnis (incumbent)	10,984	97.59
Write-in		271	2.41
Total votes		11,255	100.0
Republican hold			

=== District 57 ===
57th District general election
Party	Candidate	Votes	%
Democratic	Lucas Atkinson (incumbent)	8,946	98.98
Write-in		92	1.02
Total votes		9,038	100.0
Democratic hold			

=== District 58 ===
58th District general election
Party	Candidate	Votes	%
Republican	Jeff Johnson (incumbent)	9,580	98.65
Write-in		131	1.35
Total votes		9,711	100.0
Republican hold			

=== District 59 ===
59th District general election
Party	Candidate	Votes	%
Democratic	Terry Alexander (incumbent)	9,064	98.31
Write-in		156	1.69
Total votes		9,220	100.0
Democratic hold			

=== District 60 ===
60th District general election
Party	Candidate	Votes	%
Republican	Phillip Lowe (incumbent)	7,548	61.11
Democratic	Devon Justin Long	4,794	38.81
Write-in		10	0.08
Total votes		12,352	100.0
Republican hold			

=== District 61 ===
61st District general election
Party	Candidate	Votes	%
Democratic	Roger K. Kirby (incumbent)	7,246	98.54
Write-in		107	1.46
Total votes		7,246	100.0
Democratic hold			

=== District 62 ===
62nd District general election
Party	Candidate	Votes	%
Democratic	Robert Williams (incumbent)	7,821	63.12
Republican	Billy Baldwin	4,555	36.76
Write-in		15	0.15
Total votes		12,391	100.0
Democratic hold			

=== District 63 ===
63rd District general election
Party	Candidate	Votes	%
Republican	Jay Jordan (incumbent)	9,171	64.60
Democratic	Mike Brank	5,016	35.33
Write-in		9	0.06
Total votes		14,196	100.0
Republican hold			

=== District 64 ===
64th District general election
Party	Candidate	Votes	%
Democratic	Robert L. Ridgeway III (incumbent)	9,665	98.70
Write-in		127	1.30
Total votes		9,792	100.0
Democratic hold			

=== District 65 ===
65th District general election
Party	Candidate	Votes	%
Republican	Jay Lucas (incumbent)	8,962	98.83
Write-in		106	1.17
Total votes		9,068	100.0
Republican hold			

=== District 66 ===
66th District general election
Party	Candidate	Votes	%
Democratic	Gilda Cobb-Hunter (incumbent)	8,800	71.53
Republican	Tom Connor	3,497	28.42
Write-in		6	0.05
Total votes		12,303	100.0
Democratic hold			

=== District 67 ===
67th District general election
Party	Candidate	Votes	%
Republican	Murrell "George" Smith (incumbent)	8,640	82.17
Libertarian	Brandon Humphries	1,811	17.22
Write-in		64	0.61
Total votes		10,515	100.0
Republican hold			

=== District 68 ===
68th District general election
Party	Candidate	Votes	%
Republican	Heather Ammons Crawford (incumbent)	9,457	79.29
Libertarian	Cameron Ventura	2,408	20.19
Write-in		62	0.52
Total votes		11,927	100.0
Republican hold			

=== District 69 ===
69th District general election
Party	Candidate	Votes	%
Republican	Chris Wooten (incumbent)	10,587	64.69
TOTAL	Beth Ann Rocheleau	5,330	32.56
Democratic	Beth Ann Rocheleau	5,074	31.00
Working Families	Beth Ann Rocheleau	256	1.56
Libertarian	David Morris	425	2.60
Write-in		24	0.15
Total votes		16,366	100.0
Republican hold			

=== District 70 ===
70th District general election
Party	Candidate	Votes	%
Democratic	Wendy C. Brawley (incumbent)	9,820	98.21
Write-in		179	1.79
Total votes		9,999	100.0
Democratic hold			

=== District 71 ===
71st District general election
Party	Candidate	Votes	%
Republican	Nathan Ballentine (incumbent)	13,844	97.35
Write-in		377	2.65
Total votes		14,221	100.0
Republican hold			

=== District 72 ===
72nd District general election
Party	Candidate	Votes	%
Democratic	Seth Rose	7,301	98.66
Write-in		99	1.34
Total votes		7,400	100.0
Democratic hold			

=== District 73 ===
73rd District general election
Party	Candidate	Votes	%
Democratic	Chris Hart (incumbent)	8,900	77.95
Republican	Ralph Bell	2,513	22.01
Write-in		5	0.04
Total votes		11,418	100.0
Democratic hold			

=== District 74 ===
74th District general election
Party	Candidate	Votes	%
Democratic	J. Todd Rutherford (incumbent)	9,681	90.05
United Citizens	Michael L. Block	1,018	9.47
Write-in		52	0.48
Total votes		10,751	100.0
Democratic hold			

=== District 75 ===
75th District general election
Party	Candidate	Votes	%
Republican	Kirkman Finlay III (incumbent)	7,842	57.48
TOTAL	John Crangle	5,780	42.37
Democratic	John Crangle	5,594	41.01
American	John Crangle	186	1.36
Write-in		20	0.15
Total votes		13,642	100.0
Republican hold			

=== District 76 ===
76th District general election
Party	Candidate	Votes	%
Democratic	Leon Howard (incumbent)	10,639	100.0
Write-in		88	0.82
Total votes		10,727	99.18
Democratic hold			

=== District 77 ===
77th District general election
Party	Candidate	Votes	%
Democratic	Kambrell Garvin	14,056	84.75
Libertarian	Justin Bishop	2,445	14.74
Write-in		85	0.51
Total votes		16,586	100.0
Democratic hold			

=== District 78 ===
78th District general election
Party	Candidate	Votes	%
Democratic	Beth Bernstein (incumbent)	10,178	97.87
Write-in		222	2.13
Total votes		10,400	100.0
Democratic hold			

=== District 79 ===
79th District general election
Party	Candidate	Votes	%
Democratic	Ivory Thigpen (incumbent)	13,307	87.82
Libertarian	Victor Kocher	1,782	11.76
Write-in		63	0.43
Total votes		15,152	100.0
Democratic hold			

=== District 80 ===
80th District general election
Party	Candidate	Votes	%
Democratic	Jimmy Bales (incumbent)	9,722	97.94
Write-in		204	2.06
Total votes		9,926	100.0
Democratic hold			

=== District 81 ===
81st District general election
Party	Candidate	Votes	%
Republican	Bart Blackwell (incumbent)	11,342	62.95
TOTAL	Elise Fox	6,667	37.0
Democratic	Elise Fox	6,317	35.06
Working Families	Elise Fox	350	1.94
Write-in		8	0.04
Total votes		18,017	100.0
Republican hold			

=== District 82 ===
82nd District general election
Party	Candidate	Votes	%
Democratic	William "Bill" Clyburn, Sr. (incumbent)	8,041	96.69
Write-in		275	3.31
Total votes		8,316	100.0
Democratic hold			

=== District 83 ===
83rd District general election
Party	Candidate	Votes	%
Republican	Bill Hixon (incumbent)	10,414	80.44
Libertarian	David Weikle	2,431	18.78
Write-in		102	0.79
Total votes		12,947	100.0
Republican hold			

=== District 84 ===
84th District general election
Party	Candidate	Votes	%
Republican	Ronnie Young (incumbent)	8,270	64.76
Democratic	Jennifer Cook Lariscey	4,487	35.13
Write-in		14	0.11
Total votes		12,771	100.0
Republican hold			

=== District 85 ===
85th District general election
Party	Candidate	Votes	%
Republican	Chip Huggins (incumbent)	12,206	66.01
TOTAL	Sam Edwards	6,273	33.93
Democratic	Sam Edwards	5,926	32.05
Working Families	Sam Edwards	347	1.88
Write-in		12	0.06
Total votes		18,491	100.0
Republican hold			

=== District 86 ===
86th District general election
Party	Candidate	Votes	%
Republican	Bill Taylor (incumbent)	9,703	97.75
Write-in		223	2.25
Total votes		9,923	100.0
Republican hold			

=== District 87 ===
87th District general election
Party	Candidate	Votes	%
Republican	Paula Rawl Calhoon	13,617	73.68
Democratic	Diane Summers	4,832	26.15
Write-in		32	0.17
Total votes		18,481	100.0
Republican hold			

=== District 88 ===
88th District general election
Party	Candidate	Votes	%
Republican	McLain "Mac" Toole (incumbent)	9,872	98.24
Write-in		177	1.76
Total votes		10,049	100.0
Republican hold			

=== District 89 ===
89th District general election
Party	Candidate	Votes	%
Republican	Micah Caskey (incumbent)	8,861	97.34
Write-in		242	2.66
Total votes		9,103	100.0
Republican hold			

=== District 90 ===
90th District general election
Party	Candidate	Votes	%
Democratic	Justin Bamberg (incumbent)	7,146	96.54
Write-in		256	3.46
Total votes		7,402	100.0
Democratic hold			

=== District 91 ===
91st District general election
Party	Candidate	Votes	%
Democratic	Lonnie Hosey (incumbent)	8,768	98.78
Write-in		108	1.22
Total votes		8,876	100.0
Democratic hold			

=== District 92 ===
92nd District general election
Party	Candidate	Votes	%
Republican	Joe Daning (incumbent)	8,874	97.03
Write-in		272	2.97
Total votes		9,146	100.0
Republican hold			

=== District 93 ===
93rd District general election
Party	Candidate	Votes	%
Democratic	Russell L. Ott (incumbent)	8,507	65.99
Republican	Terry L. Kiser, Sr.	4,381	33.98
Write-in		4	0.03
Total votes		12,892	100.0
Democratic hold			

=== District 94 ===
94th District general election
Party	Candidate	Votes	%
Republican	Con Chellis	8,458	62.93
Democratic	Damian Daly	4,968	36.96
Write-in		14	0.10
Total votes		13,440	100.0
Republican hold			

=== District 95 ===
95th District general election
Party	Candidate	Votes	%
Democratic	Jerry Govan (incumbent)	8,602	72.48
Republican	Chester D. Palmer	3,258	27.45
Write-in		8	0.07
Total votes		11,868	100.0
Democratic hold			

=== District 96 ===
96th District general election
Party	Candidate	Votes	%
Republican	Kit Spires (incumbent)	7,040	71.73
Democratic	Bob Vanlue	2,754	28.06
Write-in		20	0.20
Total votes		9,814	100.0
Republican hold			

=== District 97 ===
97th District general election
Party	Candidate	Votes	%
Republican	Mandy W. Kimmons	7,746	53.86
Democratic	Patsy G. Knight (incumbent)	6,629	46.10
Write-in		6	0.04
Total votes		14,381	100.0
Republican gain from Democratic			

=== District 98 ===
98th District general election
Party	Candidate	Votes	%
Republican	Chris Murphy (incumbent)	9,179	96.12
Write-in		371	3.88
Total votes		9,550	100.0
Republican hold			

=== District 99 ===
99th District general election
Party	Candidate	Votes	%
Republican	Nancy Mace (incumbent)	10,836	60.97
TOTAL	Jen Gibson	6,927	38.98
Democratic	Jen Gibson	6,590	37.08
Working Families	Jen Gibson	337	1.90
Write-in		9	0.05
Total votes		17,772	100.0
Republican hold			

=== District 100 ===
100th District general election
Party	Candidate	Votes	%
Republican	Sylleste H. Davis (incumbent)	10,809	62.52
Democratic	Michael W. Yates	6,353	36.75
Write-in		127	0.73
Total votes		17,289	100.0
Republican hold			

=== District 101 ===
101st District general election
Party	Candidate	Votes	%
Democratic	Cezar McKnight (incumbent)	8,759	96.40
Write-in		327	3.60
Total votes		9,086	100.0
Democratic hold			

=== District 102 ===
102nd District general election
Party	Candidate	Votes	%
Democratic	Joe Jefferson (incumbent)	7,480	60.92
Republican	Terry Hardesty	4,788	38.99
Write-in		11	0.09
Total votes		12,279	100.0
Democratic hold			

=== District 103 ===
103rd District general election
Party	Candidate	Votes	%
Democratic	Carl L. Anderson (incumbent)	9,078	98.27
Write-in		160	1.73
Total votes		9,238	100.0
Democratic hold			

=== District 104 ===
104th District general election
Party	Candidate	Votes	%
Republican	William Bailey	14,859	98.38
Write-in		244	1.62
Total votes		15,103	100.0
Republican hold			

=== District 105 ===
105th District general election
Party	Candidate	Votes	%
Republican	Kevin Hardee (incumbent)	8,965	97.99
Write-in		184	2.01
Total votes		9,149	100.0
Republican hold			

=== District 106 ===
106th District general election
Party	Candidate	Votes	%
Republican	Russell Fry (incumbent)	13,198	68.38
TOTAL	Robin Gause	6,088	31.54
Democratic	Robin Gause	5,779	29.94
Working Families	Robin Gause	182	0.94
American	Robin Gause	127	0.66
Write-in		14	0.07
Total votes		19,300	100.0
Republican hold			

=== District 107 ===
107th District general election
Party	Candidate	Votes	%
Republican	Alan Clemmons (incumbent)	10,617	97.49
Write-in		273	2.51
Total votes		10,890	100.0
Republican hold			

=== District 108 ===
108th District general election
Party	Candidate	Votes	%
Republican	Lee Hewitt (incumbent)	14,450	98.47
Write-in		224	1.53
Total votes		14,674	100.0
Republican hold			

=== District 109 ===
109th District general election
Party	Candidate	Votes	%
Democratic	David Mack III (incumbent)	7,473	80.81
Working Families	David Mack III (incumbent)	616	6.66
TOTAL	David Mack III (incumbent)	8,089	87.47
Libertarian	Rodney Travis	1,129	12.21
Write-in		30	0.35
Total votes		9,248	100.0
Democratic hold			

=== District 110 ===
110th District general election
Party	Candidate	Votes	%
Republican	William S. Cogswell, Jr. (incumbent)	9,264	55.07
Democratic	Ben Pogue	7,548	44.87
Write-in		9	0.05
Total votes		16,821	100.0
Republican hold			

=== District 111 ===
111th District general election
Party	Candidate	Votes	%
Democratic	Wendell G. Gilliard (incumbent)	10,011	98.43
Write-in		460	1.57
Total votes		10,171	100.0
Democratic hold			

=== District 112 ===
112th District general election
Party	Candidate	Votes	%
Republican	Mike Sottile (incumbent)	12,210	57.31
TOTAL	Joe Preston	9,084	42.64
Democratic	Joe Preston	8,712	40.89
Working Families	Joe Preston	372	1.75
Write-in		13	0.06
Total votes		21,307	100.0
Republican hold			

=== District 113 ===
113th District general election
Party	Candidate	Votes	%
Democratic	Marvin R. Pendarvis (incumbent)	8,256	98.49
Write-in		127	1.51
Total votes		8,383	100.0
Democratic hold			

=== District 114 ===
114th District general election
Party	Candidate	Votes	%
Republican	Lin Bennett (incumbent)	8,619	52.52
Democratic	Dan P. Jones	7,153	43.59
Libertarian	Melissa Couture	633	3.86
Write-in		6	0.04
Total votes		16,411	100.0
Republican hold			

=== District 115 ===
115th District general election
Party	Candidate	Votes	%
Republican	Peter McCoy (incumbent)	9,727	51.45
TOTAL	Carol Tempel	9,173	48.52
Democratic	Carol Tempel	8,776	46.42
Working Families	Carol Tempel	397	2.10
Write-in		6	0.03
Total votes		18,906	100.0
Republican hold			

=== District 116 ===
116th District general election
Party	Candidate	Votes	%
Democratic	Robert L. Brown (incumbent)	8,699	54.04
Working Families	Robert L. Brown (incumbent)	329	2.04
TOTAL	Robert L. Brown (incumbent)	9,028	56.08
Republican	Carroll O'Neal	7,065	4389
Write-in		4	0.02
Total votes		16,097	100.0
Democratic hold			

=== District 117 ===
117th District general election
Party	Candidate	Votes	%
Democratic	Krystle Matthews	5,577	53.45
Republican	Bill Crosby (incumbent)	4,842	46.41
Write-in		15	0.14
Total votes		10,434	100.0
Democratic gain from Republican			

=== District 118 ===
118th District general election
Party	Candidate	Votes	%
Republican	Bill Herbkersman (incumbent)	12,175	97.98
Write-in		251	2.02
Total votes		12,426	100.0
Republican hold			

=== District 119 ===
119th District general election
Party	Candidate	Votes	%
Democratic	Leonidas "Leon" Stavrinakis (incumbent)	11,172	64.98
Republican	Paul Sizemore	6,011	34.96
Write-in		11	0.06
Total votes		17,194	100.0
Democratic hold			

=== District 120 ===
120th District general election
Party	Candidate	Votes	%
Republican	Weston Newton (incumbent)	10,806	64.12
Democratic	Ryan Martz	6,039	35.83
Write-in		8	0.05
Total votes		16,853	100.0
Republican hold			

=== District 121 ===
121st District general election
Party	Candidate	Votes	%
Democratic	Michael F. Rivers, Sr. (incumbent)	9,440	97.92
Write-in		201	2.08
Total votes		9,641	100.0
Democratic hold			

=== District 122 ===
122nd District general election
Party	Candidate	Votes	%
Democratic	Shedron Williams	7,509	80.70
Write-in		1796	19.30
Total votes		9,305	100.0
Democratic hold			

=== District 123 ===
123rd District general election
Party	Candidate	Votes	%
Republican	Jeff Bradley (incumbent)	10,781	61.98
Democratic	Mario Martinez	6,594	37.91
Write-in		19	0.11
Total votes		17,394	100.0
Republican hold			

=== District 124 ===
124th District general election
Party	Candidate	Votes	%
Republican	Shannon Erickson (incumbent)	10,401	97.43
Write-in		274	2.57
Total votes		10,675	100.0
Republican hold			

== See also ==
- 2018 United States House of Representatives elections in South Carolina
- 2018 South Carolina elections
