= Kimmons =

Kimmons is a surname of Scottish and Irish origin.

As an Irish surname, it is anglicised from the Irish Gaelic surname Ó Comáin.

Notable people with the surname include:

- John Kimmons, United States Army general
- Mandy Kimmons (born 1984), American politician
- Ronald Kimmons, American Sport Psychologist
- Rob Kimmons (born 1981), American mixed martial artist
- Trell Kimmons (born 1985), American sprinter
