= Sottile =

Sottile is a surname. Notable people with the surname include:

- Daniele Sottile (born 1979), Italian volleyball player
- Leah Sottile, American journalist, writer, and podcast host
- Mike Sottile (born 1948), American politician
- Stefano Sottile (born 1998), Italian high jumper
