= Bruce Bryant =

Bruce Bryant may refer to:

- Bruce M. Bryant (born 1951), member of the South Carolina House of Representatives
- Bruce S. Bryant (born 1961), former member of the Maine Senate
