= Rob Harris (South Carolina politician) =

American politician (born 1965)

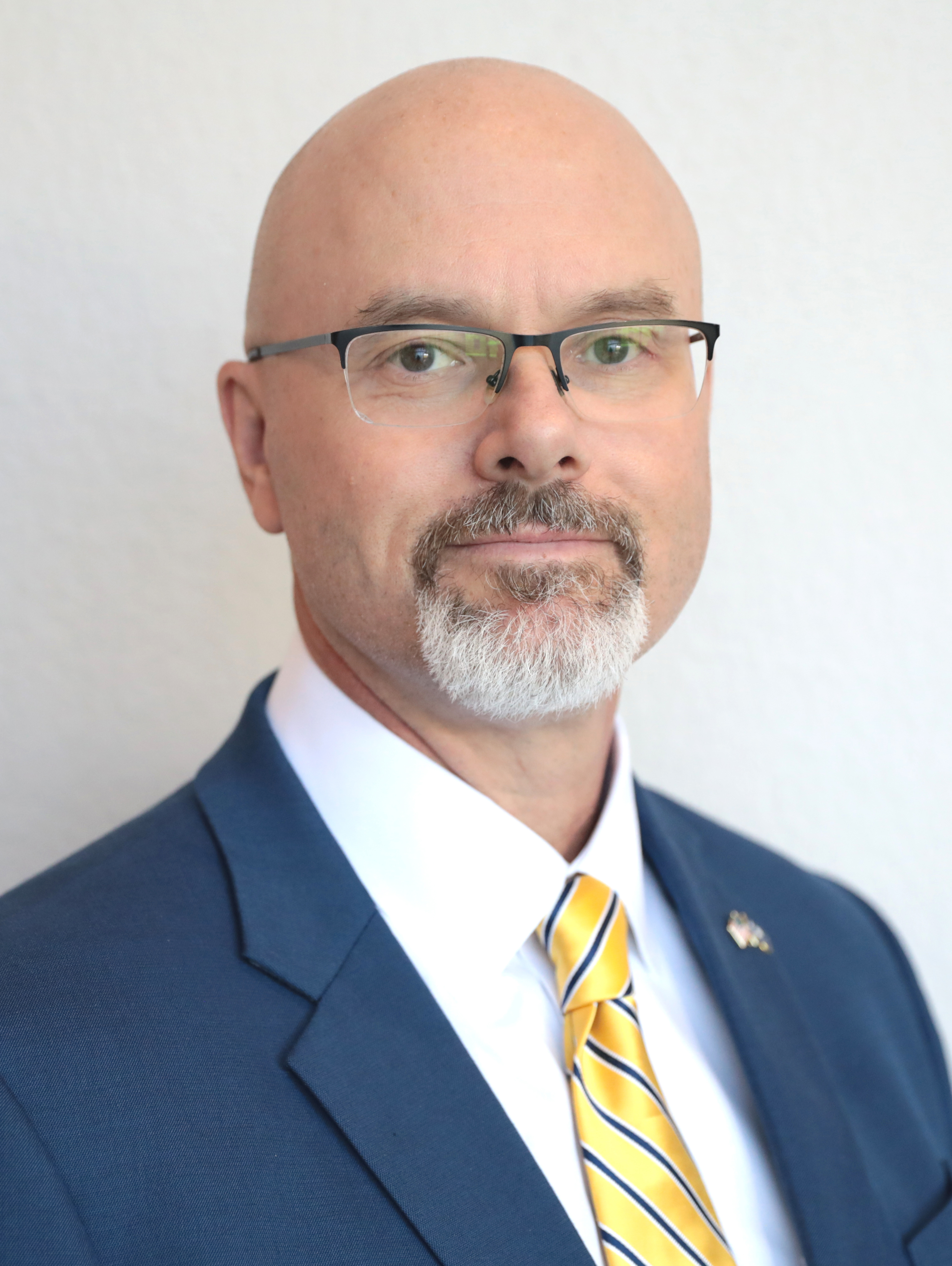

Member of the South Carolina House of Representatives from the 36th district
- Incumbent
- Assumed office November 14, 2022
- Preceded by: Rita Allison

Personal details
- Born: Robert J. Harris; June 2, 1965 (age 61)
- Party: Republican
- Education: Columbia Southern University (AS)

Robert J. "Rob" Harris is an American politician who is currently serving as a member of the South Carolina House of Representatives from the 36th district. He is a Republican and member of the South Carolina Freedom Caucus.

== Political career ==
In the June 2022 Republican primary Harris defeated incumbent Rita Allison, who had held the office since 2008. He was unopposed in the 2022 general election. He assumed office December 6, 2022.

Harris serves on the House Medical, Military, Municipal and Public Affairs Committee.

Harris authored the South Carolina Prenatal Equal Protection Act of 2023. The bill would have introduced new legal definitions regarding abortions and miscarriages. It would have also introduced new legal penalties for procuring an elective abortion, including making women who had elective abortions eligible for the death penalty. The bill attracted 21 Republican co-sponsors.

Harris has been described as a far-right conservative and is a member of the South Carolina Freedom Caucus.
