= Brian Lawson =

American politician and attorney

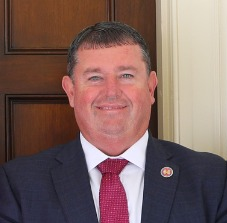
- Lawson in 2025

Member of the South Carolina House of Representatives from the 30th district
- Incumbent
- Assumed office November 14, 2022
- Preceded by: Steve Moss

Personal details
- Born: Michael Brian Lawson; April 5, 1973 (age 53) Spartanburg, South Carolina, U.S.
- Party: Republican
- Spouse: Karen Hames (m. 2004)
- Children: 2
- Education: Columbia Southern University (AS)

Brian Lawson is an American businessman and politician who is currently serving as a member of the South Carolina House of Representatives from the 30th district. Lawson is a Republican.

== Early life and career ==
Lawson was born in Spartanburg, South Carolina and graduated from Dorman High School. He worked as a career firefighter, achieving the rank of captain. He also worked as a reserve police officer and paramedic. Lawson later established his own private ambulance company South Carolina Ambulance Provider's Association and graduated from Columbia Southern University in 2022 with an Associate Degree. He was member of Arrowwood Baptist Church in Chesnee, where he has served as a Deacon and one of the RA leaders. He previously served several years on the board of Cherokee County First Steps in various roles, including Vice Chairman. He also served as the Vice President of the board for Chesnee Community Youth Athletic Association, where he have coached baseball, softball, football, and basketball for the past several years. Page text.

== Political career ==
Lawson ran unopposed in the 2022 general election. He succeeded Steve Moss, who had held the office since 2009 and did not seek reelection. He assumed office on December 6, 2022.

In 2023, Lawson was briefly among the Republican co-sponsors of the South Carolina Prenatal Equal Protection Act of 2023, which would make women who had abortions eligible for the death penalty; he later withdrew his sponsorship.
