= Paula Rawl Calhoon =

American politician

Member of the South Carolina House of Representatives from the 87th district
- Incumbent
- Assumed office November 12, 2018
- Preceded by: Todd Atwater

Personal details
- Born: December 6, 1957 (age 68) Orangeburg County, South Carolina, United States
- Party: Republican
- Education: University of South Carolina (B.A., M.S.)

Paula Rawl Calhoon (born December 6, 1957) is an American politician. She is a member of the South Carolina House of Representatives from the 87th District, serving since 2018. She is a member of the Republican Party.

== Education ==
Calhoon attended the University of South Carolina, Columbia, where she received her bachelor's degree in early education and a master’s of education.

== Career ==
Calhoon was first elected to the South Carolina House of Representatives in 2018 election for the 87th district. Calhoon serves on the House Education and Public Works Committee and on the Ethics Committee.

== Electoral history ==
South Carolina House of Representatives District 87
Year	Candidate	Votes	Pct	Candidate	Votes	Pct	Candidate	Votes	Pct
2018 Republican Primary	Paula Rawl Calhoon	2,540	45.7%	Todd Carnes	2,290	41.2%	Austin Bowers	723	13.0%
2018 Republican Primary Runoff	Paula Rawl Calhoon	3,300	53.7%	Todd Carnes	2,849	46.3%			
2018 General Election	Paula Rawl Calhoon	13,617	73.7%	Diane Summers	4,832	26.1%	Others/Write-in	32	0.2%
