= 2016 South Carolina elections =

- November 8, 2016

The South Carolina 2016 general elections for federal and state offices occurred on November 8, 2016.

== See also ==
- Political party strength in South Carolina
- Politics of South Carolina
- Elections in South Carolina
