= Laurie Funderburk =

American politician

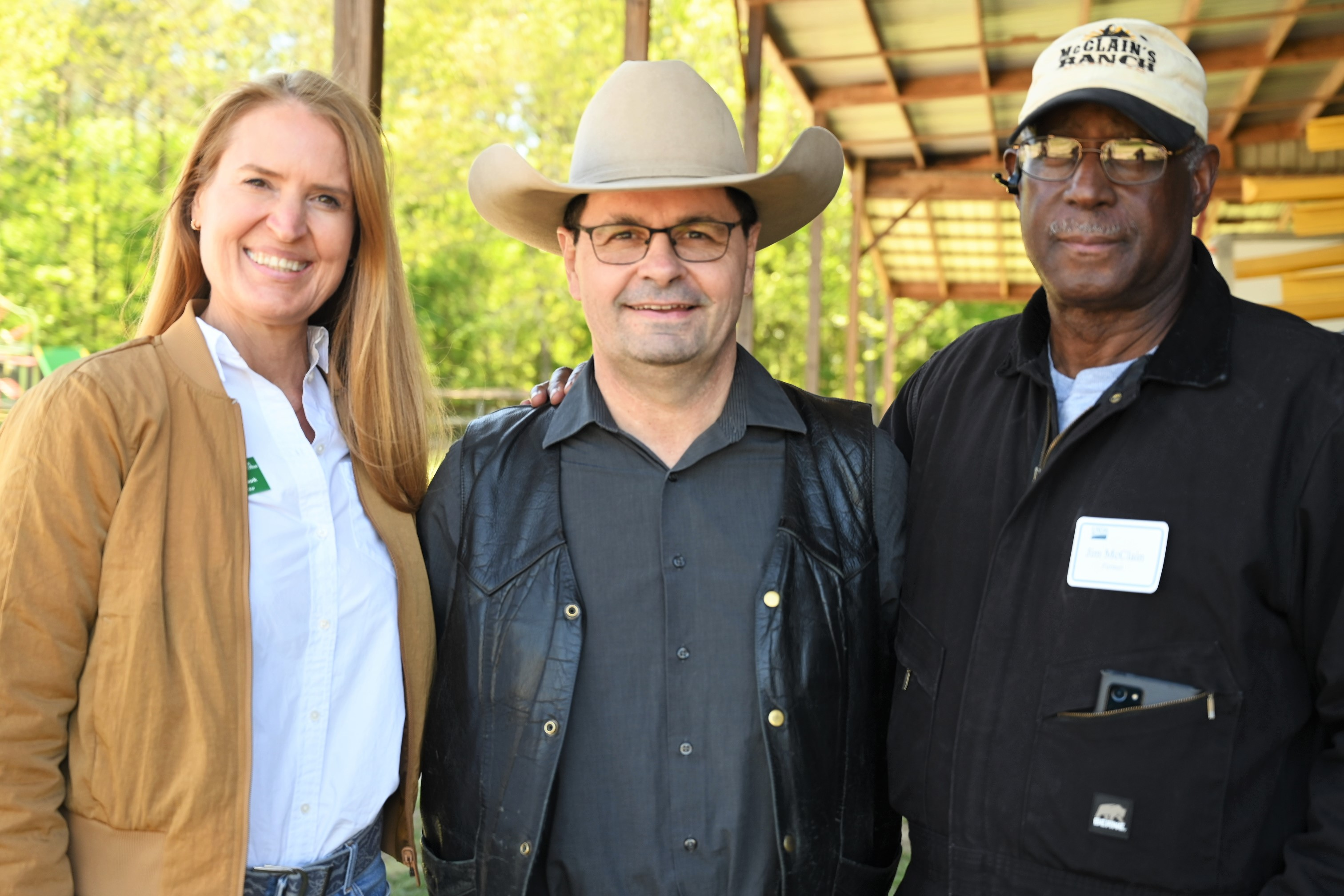

Member of the South Carolina House of Representatives from the 52nd district
- In office November 30, 2004 – November 8, 2020
- Preceded by: Vincent Sheheen
- Succeeded by: Vic Dabney

Personal details
- Born: March 31, 1975 (age 51) Camden, South Carolina
- Party: Democratic
- Spouse: Harold
- Education: University of South Carolina
- Profession: Attorney
- Website: www.lauriefunderburk.com

Laurie Slade Funderburk (born March 31, 1975) is a former Democratic member of the South Carolina House of Representatives, serving from 2005 to 2020. Funderburk has also served as a clerk for the South Carolina Senate Judiciary Committee.
