= Bill Herbkersman =

American politician

William G. "Bill" Herbkersman

Member of the South Carolina House of Representatives from the 118th district
- Incumbent
- Assumed office November 11, 2002

Personal details
- Born: June 30, 1958 (age 68) Bedford, Ohio, United States
- Party: Republican
- Education: University of South Carolina Jefferson Institute
- Profession: Eco-Development, Real Estate Development

William G. "Bill" Herbkersman (born June 30, 1958) is an American politician. He is a member of the South Carolina House of Representatives representing the 118th District and is a member of the Republican party.

== Early life and education ==
Herbkersman has lived and raised his children in Bluffton. He attended the University of South Carolina and the Jefferson Institute, and is a member of numerous organizations both local and national.

== Political career ==
Herbkersman has represented the 118th District in the South Carolina House of Representatives since 2002. He chairs the South Carolina House Labor, Commerce and Industry committee.

In 2024, Herbkersman's electoral win gave him his 12th term in office.
