= David Mack (politician) =

American politician (1953–2023)

Member of the South Carolina House of Representatives from the 109th district
- In office 1997 – November 8, 2020
- Preceded by: Lucille Whipper
- Succeeded by: Deon Tedder

Personal details
- Born: David James Mack III; December 13, 1953 Charleston, South Carolina, U.S.
- Died: September 20, 2023 (aged 69)
- Party: Democratic

David James Mack III (December 13, 1953 – September 20, 2023) was an American politician. He was a member of the South Carolina House of Representatives from the 103rd District, serving from 1997 to 2020. Mack was a member of the Democratic Party. Mack died on September 20, 2023, at the age of 69.
