= Craig A. Gagnon =

American politician

Member of the South Carolina House of Representatives from the 11th district
- Incumbent
- Assumed office November 12, 2012

Personal details
- Born: August 2, 1960 (age 65) Lowell, Massachusetts, U.S.
- Party: Republican

Craig A. Gagnon (born August 2, 1960) is an American politician. He is a member of the South Carolina House of Representatives from the 11th District, serving since 2013. He is a member of the Republican party.
