= Ronnie Young =

American politician (1947–2019)

Member of the South Carolina House of Representatives from the 84th district
- In office June 6, 2017 – May 19, 2019
- Preceded by: Chris Corley
- Succeeded by: Melissa Lackey Oremus

Personal details
- Born: August 19, 1947 Aiken County, South Carolina, U.S.
- Died: May 19, 2019 (aged 71) Aiken, South Carolina, U.S.
- Party: Republican
- Spouse: Susan Napier

Ronald Young (August 19, 1947 – May 19, 2019) was an American politician.

Young graduated from the Langley-Bath-Clearwater High School. He served on the Aiken County School Board. He was a member of the South Carolina House of Representatives, who represented the 84th district as a Republican. He was elected to the House via a special election after the resignation of Chris Corley. Previously, Young served as chairman of the Aiken County Council since 1994, and as a member for 26 years.

Young, who had been in hospice care due to pancreatic cancer, liver cancer and a stroke suffered weeks prior, died on May 19, 2019, at the age of 71.
