= Bill Hixon =

American politician

Member of the South Carolina House of Representatives from the 83rd district
- Incumbent
- Assumed office November 8, 2010
- Preceded by: Don Smith

Personal details
- Born: September 6, 1957 (age 68)
- Party: Republican

William M. Hixon (born September 6, 1957) is an American politician. He is a member of the South Carolina House of Representatives from the 83rd District, serving since 2010. He is a member of the Republican party.

Hixon is Chair of the House Agriculture, Natural Resources & Environmental Affairs Committee.

== Electoral history ==
South Carolina House of Representatives District 83
Year	Candidate	Votes	Pct	Candidate	Votes	Pct	Candidate	Votes	Pct
2010 Republican Primary	Bill Hixon	2,219	67.0%	Dea Baldwin	1,093	33.0%			
2010 General Election	Bill Hixon	8,831	99.2%	Other/Write-in	76	0.8%			
2012 General Election	Bill Hixon (i)	13,360	99.2%	Other/Write-in	106	0.8%			
2014 General Election	Bill Hixon (i)	8,945	99.0%	Other/Write-in	88	1.0%			
2016 General Election	Bill Hixon (i)	14,589	100.0%						
2018 General Election	Bill Hixon (i)	10,414	80.4%	David Weikle	2,431	18.8%	Other/Write-in	102	0.8%
