= Shannon Erickson =

American politician (born 1963)

Shannon S. Erickson

Member of the South Carolina House of Representatives from the 124th district
- Incumbent
- Assumed office October 23, 2007
- Preceded by: Catherine C. Ceips

Personal details
- Born: Shannon S. Erickson; April 21, 1963 (age 63) Florence, South Carolina, U.S.
- Party: Republican
- Spouse: Kendall Erickson
- Children: Joshua Erickson, Mariah Owen
- Education: University of South Carolina Aiken (BA, ECE)

Shannon S. Erickson (born April 21, 1963) is an American politician. She is a member of the South Carolina House of Representatives from the 124th District, serving since 2007. She is a member of the Republican party.

Erickson is Chair of the House Education and Public Works Committee.

== Early life and education ==
Shannon was born and raised in Florence, South Carolina. Her father was a member of the United States Army, stationed in Korea. While in high school, Shannon was an active member of Episcopal Youth Group.
