= Rick Martin (South Carolina politician) =

American politician

Member of the South Carolina House of Representatives from the 40th district
- In office November 14, 2016 – December 6, 2022
- Preceded by: Walton McLeod
- Succeeded by: Joe White

Personal details
- Born: October 13, 1967 (age 58) Newberry, South Carolina, United States
- Party: Republican

Richard Martin (born October 13, 1967) is an American politician. He is a former member of the South Carolina House of Representatives from the 40th District, serving from 2016 to 2022. He was defeated by Joe White in the 2022 Republican primary. He is a member of the Republican party.

In 2025, he was convicted of misconduct whilst in office.
