= Weston J. Newton =

American politician

Wm. Weston J. Newton

Member of the South Carolina House of Representatives from the 120th district
- Incumbent
- Assumed office 2013

Personal details
- Born: February 22, 1967 (age 59) Greenville, South Carolina, United States
- Party: Republican
- Spouse: Rose Newton
- Children: Reedy Newton, William Newton Jr., Eliza Rose Newton
- Education: Washington & Lee University, University of South Carolina Law School
- Occupation: Attorney

William Weston J. Newton (born February 22, 1967) is an American politician. He is a member of the South Carolina House of Representatives from the 120th District, serving since 2013. He is a member of the Republican party. He was the chairman of the oversight committee and served on the judiciary committee.

In 2022, Newton was appointed Chair of the House Judiciary Committee.
