= Lonnie Hosey =

American politician

Member of the South Carolina House of Representatives from the 91st district
- Incumbent
- Assumed office 1999

Personal details
- Born: December 1, 1946 (age 79) Dunbarton, South Carolina, United States
- Party: Democratic

Lonnie Hosey (born December 1, 1946) is an American politician. He is a member of the South Carolina House of Representatives from the 91st District, serving since 1999. He is a member of the Democratic party.
