= Chandra Dillard =

American politician

Member of the South Carolina House of Representatives from the 23rd district
- Incumbent
- Assumed office November 10, 2008
- Preceded by: Fletcher Nathaniel Smith Jr.

Personal details
- Born: March 10, 1965 (age 61) Greenville, South Carolina, U.S.
- Party: Democratic

Chandra Dillard (born March 10, 1965) is an American politician and the daughter of Moses Dillard. She is a member of the South Carolina House of Representatives from the 23rd District, serving since 2009. She is a member of the Democratic party. Dillard is the Deputy Minority Leader of the House. She serves on the Public Education Budget Subcommittee and the Sales & Use Tax and Income Tax Legislative Subcommittee of the House Ways and Means Committee.

Prior to that, Dillard spent nine years on the Greenville City Council. She has served as secretary of the House Ethics Committee and House Agriculture, Natural Resources & Environmental Affairs Committee. She is a former president of the Conference of Black Municipal Elected Officials (2006–08) and former President of the South Carolina General Assembly Women's Caucus (2015–16). A strong advocate for early childhood education, Rep. Dillard has been recognized by the South Carolina Institute for Child Success. In addition, she has been honored by the South Carolina Independent Colleges and Universities as Legislative Champion of the Year, has been a Green Tie honoree by the South Carolina Conservation Voters, and has received the Leadership Greenville Distinguished Alumni Award from the Greenville Chamber of Commerce.

Dillard was among a number of African American women from around the United States who endorsed Hillary Rodham Clinton for President in 2016.

Dillard is Director of Community Relations for Furman University. She holds a Bachelor of Science degree in Business Administration from Winthrop University and a Masters in Public Administration (MPA) from Walden University. She is also a graduate of Leadership Greenville, Furman's Riley Institute Diversity Leadership Initiative, and Leadership South Carolina. She is a member of the Epsilon Tau Omega chapter of Alpha Kappa Alpha sorority, and a Lay Leader at John Wesley United Methodist Church. Rep. Dillard serves on boards including those of Community Works Carolina, the Bank of Travelers Rest Advisory Board and the Greenville Peace Center.
