= Heather Ammons Crawford =

American politician

Member of the South Carolina House of Representatives from the 68th district
- Incumbent
- Assumed office August 4, 2012
- Preceded by: Thad Viers

Personal details
- Born: Myrtle Beach, South Carolina
- Party: Republican

Heather Ammons Crawford is an American politician who has served in the South Carolina House of Representatives from the 68th district since 2012.

Crawford serves on the House Ways and Means Committee.
