= Eddie Tallon =

American politician

Member of the South Carolina House of Representatives from the 33rd district
- In office 2011 – November 8, 2020
- Succeeded by: Travis Moore

Personal details
- Born: September 30, 1944 (age 81) Baltimore, Maryland, United States
- Party: Republican

Edward R. Tallon, Sr. (born September 30, 1944) is an American politician. He is a former member of the South Carolina House of Representatives from the 33rd District, serving from 2011 to 2020. He is a member of the Republican party.

In 2019, Tallon proposed to bring back the electric chair as the default method for killing death row inmates.
