= Jimmy Bales =

American politician (1935–2021)

Member of the South Carolina House of Representatives from the 80th district
- In office 1999 – November 9, 2020

Personal details
- Born: September 25, 1935 Rose Hill, Virginia, U.S.
- Died: September 25, 2021 (aged 86) Eastover, South Carolina, U.S.
- Party: Democratic

Jimmy C. Bales (September 25, 1935 – September 25, 2021) was an American politician. He served as a member of the South Carolina House of Representatives from the 80th District from 1999 to 2020. He is a member of the Democratic Party. Bales ran for re-election in 2020, but was defeated by Jermaine Johnson in the Democratic primary.
