= Gary Clary =

American politician

Gary E. Clary

Member of the South Carolina House of Representatives from the 3rd district
- In office 2015 – November 8, 2020
- Preceded by: B. R. Skelton
- Succeeded by: Jerry Carter

Personal details
- Born: January 5, 1948 (age 78) Gaffney, South Carolina, United States
- Party: Republican

Gary E. Clary (born January 5, 1948) is an American politician. He is a former member of the South Carolina House of Representatives from the 3rd District, serving from 2015 to 2020. He is a member of the Republican party.
