= Michael A. Anthony =

American politician

Member of the South Carolina House of Representatives from the 42nd district
- In office 2003 – November 12, 2018
- Succeeded by: Doug Gilliam

Personal details
- Born: April 4, 1950 (age 76) Union, South Carolina, U.S.
- Party: Democratic

Michael A. Anthony (born April 4, 1950) is an American politician. He is a former member of the South Carolina House of Representatives from the 42nd District, serving from 2003 to 2018. He is a member of the Democratic party.
