= Jackie E. Hayes =

American politician

Member of the South Carolina House of Representatives from the 55th district
- Incumbent
- Assumed office November 9, 1998
- Preceded by: Marion Hardy Kinon

Personal details
- Born: October 12, 1961 (age 64) Marion, South Carolina, United States
- Party: Democratic
- Spouse: Vera McClellan
- Children: 3
- Education: Catawba College (B.A.)
- Occupation: High School Football Coach

Jackie Elliott Hayes (born October 12, 1961) is an American politician. He is a member of the South Carolina House of Representatives from the 55th District, serving since 1998. He is a member of the Democratic party. He is also known as Coach Hayes from his career as a football coach.

== Background ==
Hayes was born in Marion, SC and worked as a coach at Dillon High School since the 1990s. In 1998, he was elected to the South Carolina House of Representatives succeeding Marion Hardy Kinon.

== In the legislature ==
Hayes currently serves on the House Ways and Means Committee. In 2022, he was the only Democrat in this committee to vote for a bill that restricted access to abortion with no exception for rape or incest.

== Electoral history ==
55th District Primary Election, 2022
Party	Candidate	Votes	%
Democratic	Jackie E Hayes (incumbent)	2,327	62.99
Democratic	Jamal Campbell	1,367	37.01
Total votes		3,694	100.0
Jackie E. Hayes hold			

55th District General Election, 2022
Party	Candidate	Votes	%
Democratic	Jackie E Hayes (incumbent)	5,577	49.85
Republican	Robert Norton	5,208	46.55
Independent	Michael Copland	383	3.42
Write-in		20	0.18
Total votes		11,188	100.0
Democratic hold			
