= Richie Yow =

American politician

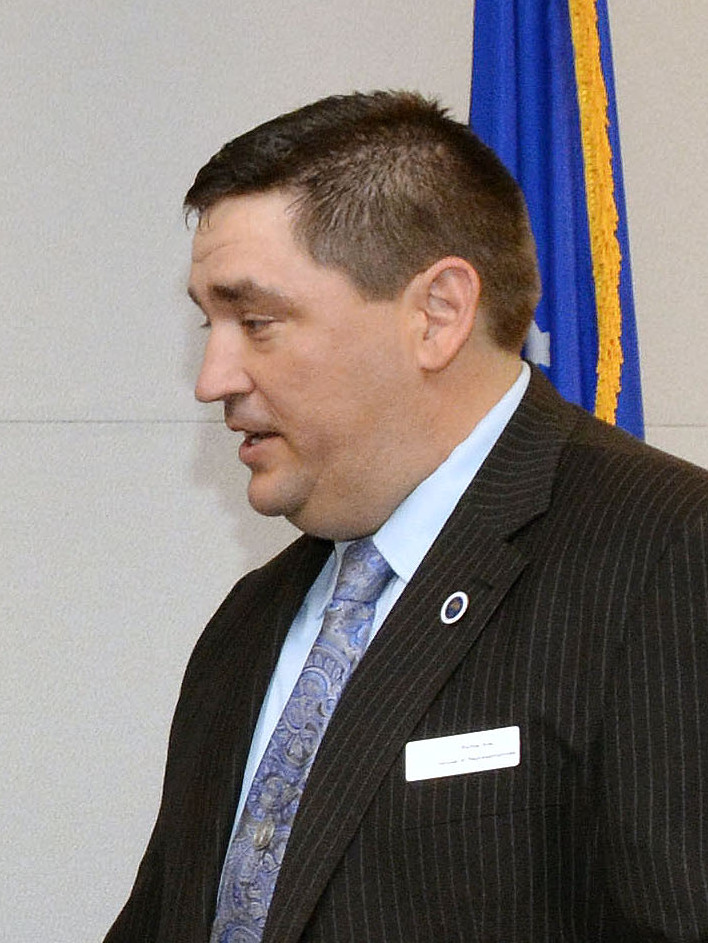
- Yow in 2015

Member of the South Carolina House of Representatives from the 53rd district
- Incumbent
- Assumed office 2014
- Preceded by: Ted Vick

Personal details
- Born: Richard L. Yow; October 28, 1974 (age 51) Cheraw, South Carolina, U.S.
- Party: Republican
- Education: Milwaukee School of Engineering

Richard L. Yow (born October 28, 1974) is an American politician. He is a member of the South Carolina House of Representatives from the 53rd District, serving since 2014. He is a member of the Republican Party.
