= Robert Brown (South Carolina politician) =

American politician (born 1950)

Member of the South Carolina House of Representatives from the 116th district
- In office 2001 – November 8, 2020
- Preceded by: Curtis B. Inabinett
- Succeeded by: Chardale Murray

Personal details
- Born: July 24, 1950 (age 75) Hollywood, South Carolina, U.S.
- Party: Democratic

Robert L. Brown (born July 24, 1950) is an American politician. He is a former member of the South Carolina House of Representatives from the 116th District, serving from 2001 to 2020. He is a member of the Democratic party.
