= Mac Toole =

American politician

McLain Toole

Member of the South Carolina House of Representatives from the 88th district
- In office 2002 – November 8, 2020
- Preceded by: Jake Knotts
- Succeeded by: RJ May

Personal details
- Born: March 8, 1946 (age 80) Columbia, South Carolina, United States
- Party: Republican

McLain R. Toole (born March 8, 1946) is an American politician. He is a former member of the South Carolina House of Representatives from the 88th District, serving from 2002 to 2020. He is a member of the Republican Party.
