= Chip Huggins =

American politician

Member of the South Carolina House of Representatives from the 85th district
- In office 1999 – November 14, 2022
- Preceded by: André Bauer
- Succeeded by: Jay Kilmartin

Personal details
- Born: November 30, 1961 (age 64) Columbia, South Carolina, U.S.
- Party: Republican
- Spouse: Ginger E. Gilstrap (m. 1988)
- Children: 2
- Education: Winthrop University
- Profession: Politician

"Chip" Huggins (born November 30, 1961, in Columbia, South Carolina) is a Republican member of the South Carolina House of Representatives. He has represented his Lexington County district (the 85th) since being elected in 1999 to succeed André Bauer.

Huggins graduated from Winthrop University in 1987, where he was a member of Sigma Alpha Epsilon. He married Ginger E. Gilstrap in 1988 and has two children.

Huggins defeated Richard Eckstrom to win his first election in 1999. He generally runs unopposed, and in 2008 when opposed by Democrat Jim Nelson won 13,122 votes (69.43% of the total) to Nelson's 5,769 (30.52%).

Huggins was opposed by Democrat Sam Edwards in the 2018 midterm election. Edwards received 6,273 votes (33.93%) to Huggins's 12,206 (66.01%).
