= Mandy Kimmons =

American politician (born 1984)

Member of the South Carolina House of Representatives from the 97th district
- In office 2018–2021
- Preceded by: Patsy Knight
- Succeeded by: Robby Robbins

Personal details
- Born: October 28, 1984 (age 41) Greensboro, North Carolina
- Party: Republican
- Education: University of South Carolina

Mandy Kimmons is an American politician. She was a member of the South Carolina House of Representatives from the 97th District, serving from 2018 until 2021. She is a member of the Republican party.

On 22 December 2021, Kimmons announced her resignation for the House of Representatives in order to focus on her legal practice and service to her community.
