= Robert L. Ridgeway III =

American politician

Member of the South Carolina House of Representatives from the 64th district
- In office 2012 – November 9, 2020
- Preceded by: Kevin L. Johnson
- Succeeded by: Kimberly Johnson

Personal details
- Born: March 11, 1958 (age 68) Manning, South Carolina, United States
- Party: Democratic
- Education: University of South Carolina (MD)
- Profession: physician, firefighter

Robert L. Ridgeway III is an American politician. He is a former member of the South Carolina House of Representatives from the 64th District, serving from 2012 to 2020. He is a member of the Democratic Party.
