= Doug Gilliam =

American politician

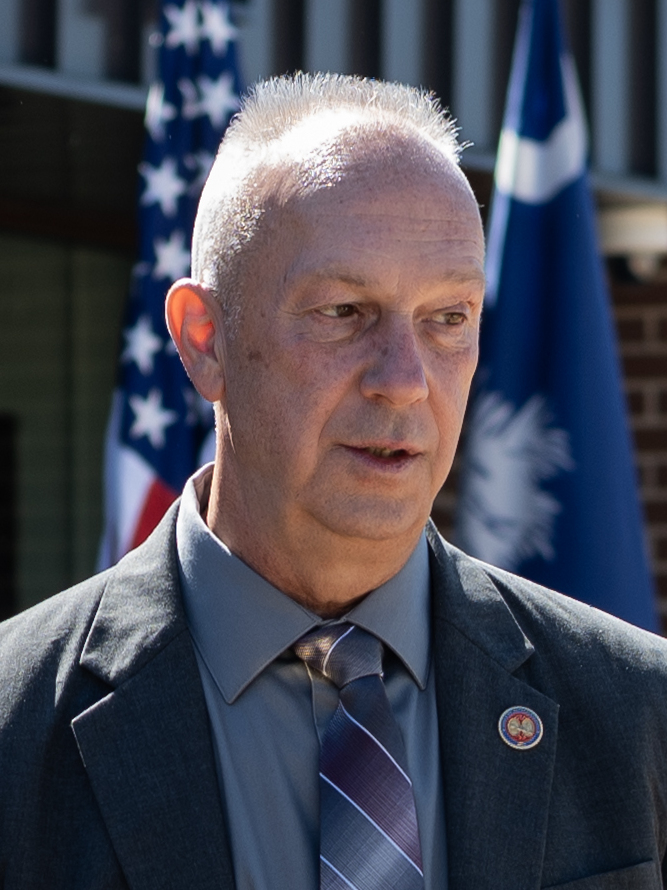

Member of the South Carolina House of Representatives from the 42nd district
- Incumbent
- Assumed office November 12, 2018
- Preceded by: Michael A. Anthony

Personal details
- Born: November 22, 1964 (age 61) Union County, South Carolina, United States
- Party: Republican
- Spouse: Pamela Rodgers (m. 1986)
- Education: Liberty University (B.S.); University of South Carolina Union (A.A.)

Leon D. "Doug" Gilliam (born November 22, 1964) is an American politician. He is a member of the South Carolina House of Representatives from the 42nd District, serving since 2018. He is a member of the Republican party.
