= Joseph Daning =

American politician

Member of the South Carolina House of Representatives from the 92nd district
- In office 2008–2022
- Succeeded by: Brandon Cox

Personal details
- Born: December 12, 1942 (age 83) Philadelphia, Pennsylvania, United States
- Party: Republican
- Profession: educator

Joseph Daning (born December 12, 1942) is an American politician. He is a member of the South Carolina House of Representatives from the 92nd District, serving from 2008 to 2022. He is a member of the Republican party. He served in the United States Air Force from 1960 to 1964. He graduated from Southern Illinois University in 1995. He lives in Goose Creek.
