= Phillip Lowe =

American politician

Member of the South Carolina House of Representatives from the 60th district
- Incumbent
- Assumed office 2007

Personal details
- Born: December 16, 1958 (age 67) Thomasville, Georgia, United States
- Party: Republican

Phillip Lowe (born December 16, 1958) is an American politician. He is a member of the South Carolina House of Representatives from the 60th District, serving since 2007. He is a member of the Republican party.
