= Tommy Stringer =

American politician

Member of the South Carolina House of Representatives from the 18th district
- In office 2009 – January 5, 2022
- Succeeded by: Alan Morgan

Personal details
- Born: Greer, South Carolina, United States
- Party: Republican

Tommy Stringer is an American politician. He was a member of the South Carolina House of Representatives from the 18th District, serving from 2009 to 2022. He stepped down due to family and health circumstances. He is a member of the Republican party.
