= Rita Allison =

American politician

Member of the South Carolina House of Representatives from the 36th district
- In office 2008 – December 6, 2022
- Succeeded by: Robert Harris

Personal details
- Born: February 19, 1940 (age 86) Spartanburg, South Carolina, U.S.
- Party: Republican

Merita Ann Allison (born February 19, 1940) is an American politician. She is a former member of the South Carolina House of Representatives from the 36th District, serving from 2008 to 2022. She was defeated by Rob Harris in the Republican Primary in 2022. She also sat in the House from 1993 to 2002.
