= Steve Moss (politician) =

American politician

Member of the South Carolina House of Representatives from the 30th district
- In office 2009–2022
- Preceded by: Olin Phillips
- Succeeded by: Brian Lawson

Personal details
- Born: February 3, 1950 Cherokee County, South Carolina, U.S.
- Died: May 9, 2024 (aged 74) Cherokee County, South Carolina, U.S.
- Party: Republican

Van Stephen Moss (February 3, 1950 – May 9, 2024) was an American politician. He was a member of the South Carolina House of Representatives from the 30th District, serving since 2009. He was a member of the Republican Party.

He was the founder of The First National Bank of the Carolinas.

Moss died on May 9, 2024.
