= Mark N. Willis =

American politician (born 1959)

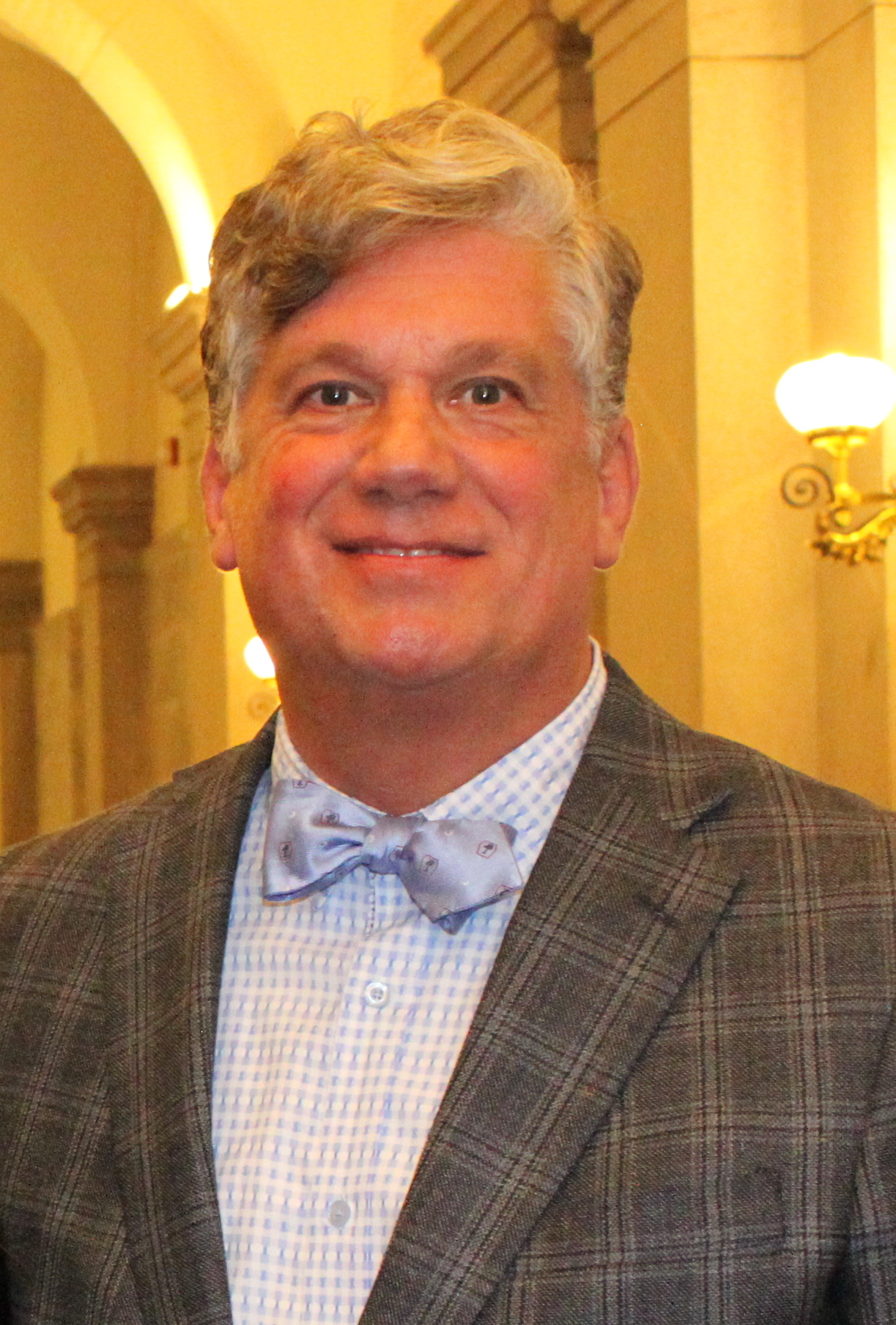

Member of the South Carolina House of Representatives from the 16th district
- Incumbent
- Assumed office November 10, 2008
- Preceded by: J. Adam Taylor

Personal details
- Born: August 1, 1963 (age 62) Greenville, South Carolina, U.S.
- Party: Republican

Mark Nye Willis (born August 1, 1959) is an American politician. He is a member of the South Carolina House of Representatives from the 16th District, serving since 2008. He is a member of the Republican party.

Willis is Chair of the House Interstate Cooperation Committee.

In 2023, Willis was briefly among the Republican co-sponsors of the South Carolina Prenatal Equal Protection Act of 2023, which would make women who had abortions eligible for the death penalty; he later withdrew his sponsorship.
