= Lee Hewitt =

American politician

Member of the South Carolina House of Representatives from the 108th district
- Incumbent
- Assumed office November 14, 2016
- Preceded by: Stephen Goldfinch

Personal details
- Born: August 29, 1960 (age 66) Marion, South Carolina, United States
- Party: Republican
- Education: University of South Carolina Coastal (B.S.)
- Profession: Realtor

Lee Hewitt (born August 29, 1960) is an American politician. He is a member of the South Carolina House of Representatives from the 108th District, serving since 2018. He is a member of the Republican party.

== Electoral history ==
South Carolina House of Representatives District 108
Year	Candidate	Votes	Pct	Candidate	Votes	Pct
2016 General Election	Lee Hewitt	17,046	100.0%			
2018 General Election	Lee Hewitt	14,450	98.5%	Others/Write-in	224	1.5%
