= Terry Alexander (politician) =

American politician (born 1955)

Member of the South Carolina House of Representatives from the 59th district
- Incumbent
- Assumed office 2007

Personal details
- Born: January 23, 1955 (age 71) Florence, South Carolina, U.S.
- Party: Democratic

Terry Alexander (born January 23, 1955) is an American politician. He is a member of the South Carolina House of Representatives from the 59th District, serving since 2007. He is a member of the Democratic party.

Alexander is 2nd Vice Chair of the House Education and Public Works Committee and serves on the Regulations and Administrative Procedures Committee. He is Region V Chair of the National Black Caucus of State Legislators, covering North Carolina and South Carolina.

== Political career ==
He was one of the introductory speakers at Bernie Sanders' 2020 Presidential Kick-Off Rally in Brooklyn, NY.

=== 2006 ===
South Carolina State House of Representatives District 59 General Election 2006
Party	Candidate	Votes	%
Democratic	Terry Alexander	5,589	99.36%
Write-in	Write-in	36	00.64%
Total votes		5,625	100.0%
