= W. Brian White =

American politician

Member of the South Carolina House of Representatives from the 6th district
- In office 2001–2022
- Succeeded by: April Cromer

Personal details
- Born: July 20, 1967 (age 58) Anderson, South Carolina, United States
- Party: Republican

W. Brian White (born July 20, 1967) is an American politician. He is a former member of the South Carolina House of Representatives from the 6th District, serving since 2001. He is a member of the Republican party. White was unseated by Republican challenger April Cromer in the June primary. She then went on to win the South Carolina 6th District seat in the general election.
