= Phyllis Henderson =

American politician

Member of the South Carolina House of Representatives from the 21st district
- In office 2010–2018
- Succeeded by: Bobby Cox

Personal details
- Born: Cincinnati, Ohio, United States
- Party: Republican

Phyllis Henderson is an American politician. She was a member of the South Carolina House of Representatives from the 21st District, serving from 2010 until 2018. She is a member of the Republican party.
