= Rosalyn Henderson-Myers =

American politician

Member of the South Carolina House of Representatives from the 31st district
- Incumbent
- Assumed office September 26, 2017
- Preceded by: Harold Mitchell, Jr.

Personal details
- Born: Rosalyn Henderson Spartanburg, South Carolina, U.S.
- Party: Democratic
- Education: University of South Carolina (BA); Tulane University (JD)
- Profession: Attorney

Rosalyn D. Henderson-Myers is an attorney and an American politician. She is a member of the South Carolina House of Representatives from the 31st District, serving since 2017. She is a member of the Democratic party.

== Political career ==
Henderson-Myers served on Spartanburg City Council from 2015 to 2017.

In May 2017, Harold Mitchell Jr. vacated his State House seat. Henderson-Myers defeated Angela Geter and Jerome Rice Jr. in the August Democratic Primary, and County Councilman Monier Abusaft in the primary runoff. She went on the defeat Republican Michael Fowler in the general election.

Henderson-Myers serves on the House Judiciary Committee. In 2022, she was on the 12-member House ad hoc committee that held public hearings on House Bill 5399 that banned abortions. She serves as Secretary of the South Carolina Legislative Black Caucus.

== Honors and awards ==
- Honored at White House event for lactation legislation, 2023
- USA Today Woman of the Year, 2024

== Personal life ==
Henderson-Myers was married to Kenneth E. Myers Sr., who died in 2023.
