= J. Anne Parks =

American politician (born 1955)

Member of the South Carolina House of Representatives from the 12th district
- In office 1999 – December 6, 2022
- Succeeded by: Daniel Gibson

Personal details
- Born: July 1, 1955 (age 71) Greenwood, South Carolina, U.S.
- Party: Democratic

J. Anne Parks (born July 1, 1955) is an American politician. She is a former member of the South Carolina House of Representatives from the 12th District, serving since 1997. She is a member of the Democratic party. In the 2022 general election, she was defeated by Republican Daniel Gibson.
