= Mike Sottile =

American politician

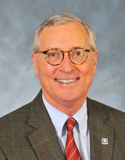

Member of the South Carolina House of Representatives from the 112th district
- In office 2009 – November 8, 2020
- Preceded by: Ben A. Hagood, Jr.
- Succeeded by: Joe Bustos

Personal details
- Born: June 7, 1948 (age 78) Rock Hill, South Carolina, United States
- Party: Republican
- Website: https://mikesottile.com/

Military service
- Branch/service: United States Air Force
- Years of service: 1968-1972

Mike Sottile (born June 7, 1948) is an American politician. He was a member of the South Carolina House of Representatives from the 112th District, serving from 2009 to 2020. He was previously mayor of Isle of Palms. He is a member of the Republican party.
