= Patsy Knight =

American politician

Member of the South Carolina House of Representatives from the 97th district
- Incumbent
- Assumed office 2006

Personal details
- Born: December 9, 1938 (age 87) Conway, South Carolina, United States
- Party: Democratic

Patsy Gleaton Knight (born December 9, 1938) is an American politician. She is a member of the South Carolina House of Representatives from the 97th District, serving since 2006. She is a member of the Democratic party.
