= Bruce M. Bryant =

American politician (born 1951)

Member of the South Carolina House of Representatives from the 48th district
- In office June 20, 2017 – January 10, 2023
- Preceded by: Ralph Norman
- Succeeded by: Brandon Guffey

Personal details
- Born: July 12, 1951 (age 75) York, South Carolina, U.S.
- Party: Republican
- Education: University of South Carolina Lancaster

Bruce M. Bryant (born July 12, 1951) is an American politician. He is a member of the South Carolina House of Representatives from the 48th District, serving since 2017. He is a member of the Republican party.
