= 2014 South Carolina House of Representatives election =

- November 4, 2014

All 124 seats in the South Carolina House of Representatives 63 seats needed for a majority

	Majority party	Minority party
Leader	Bobby Harrell	Todd Rutherford
Party	Republican	Democratic
Leader since	June 21, 2005	January 8, 2013
Leader's seat	67th	74th
Last election	78	46
Seats won	78	46
Seat change	Steady	Steady
Popular vote	649,839	377,282
Percentage	62.42%	36.24%
- Results: Republican gain Democratic gain Republican hold Democratic hold
Speaker before election
Bobby Harrell, Jr.
Republican
Elected Speaker
Jay Lucas
Republican

The 2014 South Carolina House of Representatives election was held on November 4, 2014, alongside the 2014 United States elections. Primary elections took place on June 10, 2014.

Commentators noted this election for the continued Republican dominance in state governance, a trend that began at the turn of century. Democrats fielded candidates for 62 seats, while Republicans had candidates for 91. The election saw the state's lowest turnout in a general election in forty years.

== Overview ==
Party	Votes		Seats		
Party	No.	%	No.	+/−	%
South Carolina Republican Party	649,839	62.42%	78		62.90%
South Carolina Democratic Party	377,282	36.24%	46		37.10%
Write-in	8,906	0.86%	0		0%
Libertarian Party of South Carolina	3,838	0.37%	0		0%
American Party of South Carolina	1,207	0.12%	0		0%
South Carolina Constitution Party	0	0%	0		0%
South Carolina Workers Party	0	0%	0		0%
Independent	0	0%	0		0%
Green Party	1,225	0.12%	0		0%
Total	1,041,090	100.00	124	±0	100.00
Registered voters	2,881,052	100.00			
Turnout	1,041,090	36%			
Source: South Carolina Election Commission

Popular vote
Republican	62.42%
Democratic	36.24%
Other	1.34%

House seats
Republican	62.90%
Democratic	37.10%

== Predictions ==
Source	Ranking	As of
Governing	Safe R	October 20, 2014

== Summary of Results ==
State House District	Incumbent	Party	Elected Representative	Party	
1	Bill Whitmire	Rep	Bill Whitmire	Rep	
2	Bill Sandifer, III	Rep	Bill Sandifier, III	Rep	
3	B.R. Skelton	Rep	Gary E. Clary	Rep	
4	Davey Hiott	Rep	Davey Hiott	Rep	
5	Phillip D. Owens	Rep	Neal Collins	Rep	
6	Brian White	Rep	Brian White	Rep	
7	Michael Gambrell	Rep	Michael Gambrell	Rep	
8	Don Carson Bowen	Rep	Jonathan Hill	Rep	
9	Anne J. Thayer	Rep	Anne J. Thayer	Rep	
10	Joshua A. Putnam	Rep	Joshua A. Putnam	Rep	
11	Craig A. Gagnon	Rep	Craig A. Gagnon	Rep	
12	Anne Parks	Dem	Anne Parks	Dem	
13	Robert S. Riley	Rep	Robert S. Riley	Rep	
14	Mike Pitts	Rep	Mike Pitts	Rep	
15	Samuel Rivers, Jr.	Rep	Samuel Rivers, Jr.	Rep	
16	Mark N. Willis	Rep	Mark N. Willis	Rep	
17	Mike Burns	Rep	Mike Burns	Rep	
18	Tommy Stringer	Rep	Tommy Stringer	Rep	
19	Dwight A. Loftis	Rep	Dwight A. Loftis	Rep	
20	Dan Hamilton	Rep	Dan Hamilton	Rep	
21	Phyllis J. Henderson	Rep	Phyllis J. Henderson	Rep	
22	Wendy Nanney	Rep	Wendy Nanney	Rep	
23	Chandra Dillard	Dem	Chandra Dillard	Dem	
24	Bruce W. Bannister	Rep	Bruce W. Bannister	Rep	
25	Leola Robinson-Simpson	Dem	Leola Robinson-Simpson	Dem	
26	Raye Felder	Rep	Raye Felder	Rep	
27	Garry R. Smith	Rep	Garry R. Smith	Rep	
28	Eric M. Bedingfield	Rep	Eric M. Bedingfield	Rep	
29	Dennis C. Moss	Rep	Dennis C. Moss	Rep	
30	Steve Moss	Rep	Steve Moss	Rep	
31	Harold Mitchell, Jr.	Dem	Harold Mitchell, Jr.	Dem	
32	Dertham Cole, Jr.	Rep	Derham Cole, Jr.	Rep	
33	Eddie Tallon	Rep	Eddie Tallon	Rep	
34	Mike Forrester	Rep	Mike Forrester	Rep	
35	Bill Chumley	Rep	Bill Chumley	Rep	
36	Rita Allison	Rep	Rita Allison	Rep	
37	Donna Hicks Wood	Rep	Donna Hicks Wood	Rep	
38	N. Douglas Brannon	Rep	N. Douglas Brannon	Rep	
39	Ralph S. Kennedy, Jr.	Rep	Ralph S. Kennedy, Jr.	Rep	
40	Walt McLeod, III.	Dem	Walt McLeod, III.	Dem	
41	Mary Gail Douglas	Dem	Mary Gail Douglas	Dem	
42	Mike Anthony	Dem	Mike Anthony	Dem	
43	Greg Delleney	Rep	Greg Delleney	Rep	
44	Mandy Powers-Norrell	Dem	Mandy Powers-Norrell	Dem	
45	Deborah Long	Rep	Deborah Long	Rep	
46	Gary Simrill	Rep	Gary Simrill	Rep	
47	Tommy Pope	Rep	Tommy Pope	Rep	
48	Ralph W. Norman	Rep	Ralph W. Norman	Rep	
49	John R. King	Dem	John R. King	Dem	
50	Grady Brown	Dem	Grady Brown	Dem	
51	David Weeks	Dem	David Weeks	Dem	
52	Laurie Slade Funderburk	Dem	Laurie Slade Funderburk	Dem	
53	Ted M. Vick	Dem	Amy M. Brown	Dem	
54	Elizabeth R. Munnerlyn	Dem	Patricia M. Pat Henegan	Dem	
55	Jackie E. Hayes	Dem	Jackie E. Hayes	Dem	
56	Mike Ryhal	Rep	Mike Ryhal	Rep	
57	J. Wayne George	Dem	J. Wayne George	Dem	
58	Liston Douglas Barfield	Rep	Jeff Johnson	Rep	
59	Terry Alexander	Dem	Terry Alexander	Dem	
60	Phillip Lower	Rep	Phillip Lowe	Rep	
61	Lester P. Branham, Jr.	Dem	Roger K. Kirby	Dem	
62	Robert Williams	Dem	Robert Williams	Dem	
63	Kris Crawford	Rep	Kris Crawford	Rep	
64	Robert L. Ridgeway, III.	Dem	Robert L. Ridgeway, III.	Dem	
65	Jay Lucas	Rep	Jay Lucas	Rep	
66	Gilda Cobb Hunter	Dem	Gilda Cobb Hunter	Dem	
67	Murrell Smith	Rep	Murrell Smith	Rep	
68	Heather Ammons Crawford	Rep	Heather Ammons Crawford	Rep	
69	Rick Quinn, Jr.	Rep	Rick Quinn, Jr.	Rep	
70	Joe Neal	Dem	Joe Neal	Dem	
71	Nathan Ballentine	Rep	Nathan Ballentine	Rep	
72	James E. Smith, Jr.	Dem	James E. Smith, Jr.	Dem	
73	Christopher R. Hart	Dem	Christopher R. Hart	Dem	
74	J. Todd Rutherford	Dem	J. Todd Rutherford	Dem	
75	Kirkman Finlaay, III.	Rep	Kirkman Finlay, III.	Rep	
76	Leon Howard	Dem	Leon Howard	Dem	
77	Joe McEachern	Dem	Joe McEachern	Dem	
78	Beth Bernstein	Dem	Beth Bernstein	Dem	
79	Mia McLeod	Dem	Mia McLeod	Dem	
80	Jimmy C. Bales	Dem	Jimmy C. Bales	Dem	
81	Don Wells	Rep	Don Wells	Rep	
82	William Clyburn	Dem	William Clyburn	Dem	
83	Bill Hixon	Rep	Bill Hixon	Rep	
84	J. Roland Smith	Rep	Chris Corley	Rep	
85	Chip Huggins	Rep	Chip Huggins	Rep	
86	Bill Taylor	Rep	Bill Taylor	Rep	
87	Todd Atwater	Rep	Todd Atwater	Rep	
88	Mac Toole	Rep	Mac Toole	Rep	
89	Kenny Bingham	Rep	Kenny Bingham	Rep	
90	Bakari T. Sellers	Dem	Justin Bamberg	Dem	
91	Lonnie Hosey	Dem	Lonnie Hosey	Dem	
92	Joe Daning	Rep	Joe Daning	Rep	
93	Russell L. Ott	Dem	Russell L. Ott	Dem	
94	Jenny Horne	Rep	Jenny Horne	Rep	
95	Jerry Govan, Jr.	Dem	Jerry Govan, Jr.	Dem	
96	Kit Spires	Rep	Kit Spires	Rep	
97	Patsy G. Knight	Dem	Patsy G. Knight	Dem	
98	Chris Murphy	Rep	Chris Murphy	Rep	
99	Jim Merrill	Rep	Jim Merrill	Rep	
100	Edward L. Southard	Rep	Edward L. Southard	Rep	
101	Ronnie A. Sabb	Dem	Cezar McKnight	Dem	
102	Joe Jefferson, Jr.	Dem	Joe Jefferson, Jr.	Dem	
103	Carl L. Anderson	Dem	Carl L. Anderson	Dem	
104	Tracy R. Edge	Rep	Greg Duckworth	Rep	
105	Kevin Hardee	Rep	Kevin Hardee	Rep	
106	Nelson Hardwick	Rep	Nelson Hardwick	Rep	
107	Alan D. Clemmons	Rep	Alan D. Clemmons	Rep	
108	Stephen L. Goldfinch, Jr.	Rep	Stephen L. Goldfinch, Jr.	Rep	
109	David Mack, III.	Dem	David Mack, III.	Dem	
110	Chip Limehouse, III.	Rep	Chip Limehouse, III.	Rep	
111	Wendell G. Gilliard	Dem	Wendell G. Gilliard	Dem	
112	Mike Sottile	Rep	Mike Sottile	Rep	
113	Seth Whipper	Dem	Seth Whipper	Dem	
114	Robery W. Harrell, Jr.	Rem	Mary Tinkler	Dem	Democratic flip
115	Peter McCoy, Jr.	Rep	Peter McCoy, Jr.	Rep	
116	Robert L. Brown	Dem	Robert L. Brown	Dem	
117	Bill Crosby	Rep	Bill Crosby	Rep	
118	Bill Herbkersman	Rep	Bill Herbkersman	Rep	
119	Leon Stavrinakis	Dem	Leon Stavrinakis	Dem	
120	Weston Netwon	Rep	Weston Newton	Rep	
121	Kenneth F. Hodges	Dem	Kenneth F. Hodges	Dem	
122	Bill Bowers	Dem	Bill Bowers	Dem	
123	Andrew S. Patrick	Rep	Jeff Bradley	Rep	
124	Shannon Erickson	Rep	Shannon Erickson	Rep	

== Retirements ==
11 incumbents did not seek re-election.

=== Democrats ===
- Ted Vick (District 53) did not seek re-election following controversy after an arrest.
- Elizabeth Munnerlyn (District 54)
- Lester P. Branham, Jr. (District 61)
- Bakari Sellers (District 90) retired to run for Lieutenant Governor.
- Ronnie A. Sabb (District 101) retired to run for State Senate.

=== Republicans ===
- B.R. Skelton (District 03) retired after serving in the House for twelve years.
- Phillip Owens (District 05) retired.
- Liston Barfield (District 58) retired.
- J. Roland Smith (District 84) retired after serving in the House for twenty-six years.
- Bobby Harrell, Jr. (District 114) was forced to resign his seat after he was barred from holding public office because of a campaign finance violation.
- Andy Patrick (District 123) retired and ran for the U.S. House in the 1st District.

== Detailed Results ==
=== District 1 ===
District 1 comprised a portion of Oconee County.

South Carolina House District 1 General Election, 2014
Party	Candidate	Votes	%
Write-in	N/A	68	0.79%
Republican	Bill Whitmire	8,646	99.21%
Total votes		8,714	100.0

=== District 2 ===
District 2 comprised portions of Oconee and Pickens counties.

South Carolina House District 2 General Election, 2014
Party	Candidate	Votes	%
Write-in	N/A	128	1.44%
Republican	Bill Sandifer	8,751	98.56%
Total votes		8,879	100.0

=== District 3 ===
District 3 comprised a portion of Pickens County.

South Carolina House District 3 Republican Primary Election, 2014
Party	Candidate	Votes	%
Republican	Ed Harris	1,320	43.48%
Republican	Gary E. Clary	1,716	56.52%
Total votes		3,036	100.00

South Carolina House District 3 General Election, 2014
Party	Candidate	Votes	%
Write-in	N/A	49	0.80%
South Carolina Libertarian Party	Travis McClurry	983	15.99%
Republican	Gary E. Clary	5,117	83.22%
Total votes		6,149	100.0

=== District 4 ===
District 4 comprised a portion of Pickens County.

South Carolina House District 4 Republican Primary Election, 2014
Party	Candidate	Votes	%
Republican	Michelle Wiles	1,897	40.63%
Republican	Davey Hiott	2,772	59.37%
Total votes		4,669	100.00

South Carolina House District 4 General Election, 2014
Party	Candidate	Votes	%
Write-in	N/A	126	1.40%
Republican	Davey Hiott	8,846	98.60%
Total votes		8,972	100.0

=== District 5 ===
District 5 comprised a portion of Pickens County.

South Carolina House District 5 Republican Primary Election, 2014
Party	Candidate	Votes	%
Republican	Harley Staton	339	9.25%
Republican	Rick Tate	1,007	27.48%
Republican	Neal Collins	2,319	63.27
Total votes		3,665	100.00

South Carolina House District 5 General Election, 2014
Party	Candidate	Votes	%
Write-in	N/A	59	0.69%
Republican	Neal Collins	8,476	99.31%
Total votes		8,535	100.0

=== District 6 ===
District 6 comprised a portion of Anderson County.

South Carolina House District 6 General Election, 2014
Party	Candidate	Votes	%
Write-in	N/A	84	1.03%
Republican	Brian White	8,099	98.97%
Total votes		8,183	100.0

=== District 7 ===
District 7 comprised portions of Abbeville and Anderson counties.

South Carolina House District 7 General Election, 2014
Party	Candidate	Votes	%
Write-in	N/A	26	0.41%
Republican	Michael Gambrell	6,290	99.59%
Total votes		6,316	100.0

=== District 8 ===
District 8 comprised a portion of Anderson County.

South Carolina House District 8 General Election, 2014
Party	Candidate	Votes	%
Write-in	N/A	71	0.94%
Republican	Jonathan Hill	7,505	99.06%
Total votes		7,576	100.0

=== District 9 ===
District 9 comprised a portion of Anderson County.

South Carolina House District 9 General Election, 2014
Party	Candidate	Votes	%
Write-in	N/A	56	0.78%
Republican	Anne Thayer	7,090	99.22%
Total votes		7,146	100.0

=== District 10 ===
District 10 comprised portions of Anderson, Greenville, and Pickens counties.

South Carolina House District 10 General Election, 2014
Party	Candidate	Votes	%
Write-in	N/A	83	1.01%
Republican	Joshua A. Putnam	8,146	98.99%
Total votes		8,229	100.0

=== District 11 ===
District 11 comprised portions of Abbeville and Anderson counties.

South Carolina House District 11 General Election, 2014
Party	Candidate	Votes	%
Democratic	Tombo Hite	4,217	46.25%
Republican	Craig A. Gagnon	4,899	53.73%
Total votes		9,117	100.0

=== District 12 ===
District 12 comprised a portion of Greenwood County and all of McCormick County.

South Carolina House District 12 General Election, 2014
Party	Candidate	Votes	%
Republican	Tony Wideman	3,557	42.02%
Democratic	Anne Parks	4,903	57.92%
Total votes		8,465	100.0

=== District 13 ===
District 13 comprised a portion of Greenwood County.

South Carolina House District 13 General Election, 2014
Party	Candidate	Votes	%
Write-in	N/A	73	0.80%
Republican	Robert Shannon Riley	9,058	99.20%
Total votes		9,131	100.0

=== District 14 ===
District 14 comprised portions of Greenwood and Laurens counties.

South Carolina House District 14 General Election, 2014
Party	Candidate	Votes	%
Write-in	N/A	80	0.99%
Republican	Mike Pitts	7,992	99.01%
Total votes		8,072	100.0

=== District 15 ===
District 15 comprised portions of Berkeley and Charleston counties.

South Carolina House District 15 General Election, 2014
Party	Candidate	Votes	%
Democratic	Marian Redish	2,658	43.56%
Republican	Samuel Rivers, Jr.	3,440	56.37%
Total votes		6,102	100.0

=== District 16 ===
District 16 comprised portions of Greenville and Laurens counties.

South Carolina House District 16 General Election, 2014
Party	Candidate	Votes	%
Write-in	N/A	66	0.99%
Republican	Mark N. Willis	6,615	99.01%
Total votes		6,681	100.0

=== District 17 ===
District 17 comprised a portion of Greenville County.

South Carolina House District 17 General Election, 2014
Party	Candidate	Votes	%
Write-in	N/A	66	0.67%
Republican	Mike Burns	9,717	99.33%
Total votes		9,783	100.0

=== District 18 ===
District 18 comprised a portion of Greenville County.

South Carolina House District 18 General Election, 2014
Party	Candidate	Votes	%
Write-in	N/A	86	0.93%
Republican	Tommy Stringer	9,152	99.07%
Total votes		9,238	100.0

=== District 19 ===
District 19 comprised a portion of Greenville County.

South Carolina House District 19 General Election, 2014
Party	Candidate	Votes	%
Write-in	N/A	91	1.38%
Republican	Dwight A. Loftis	6,492	98.62%
Total votes		6,583	100.0

=== District 20 ===
District 20 comprised a portion of Greenville County.

South Carolina House District 20 General Election, 2014
Party	Candidate	Votes	%
Write-in	N/A	13	0.11%
South Carolina Green Party	Jon Eames	237	2.01%
Democratic	Jon Eames	2,500	21.20%
Republican	Dan Hamilton	9,045	76.99%
Total votes		11,795	100.0

=== District 21 ===
District 21 comprised a portion of Greenville County.

South Carolina House District 21 General Election, 2014
Party	Candidate	Votes	%
Write-in	N/A	99	0.88%
Republican	Phyllis J. Henderson	11,188	99.12%
Total votes		11,287	100.0

=== District 22 ===
District 22 comprised a portion of Greenville County.

South Carolina House District 22 General Election, 2014
Party	Candidate	Votes	%
Write-in	N/A	22	0.19%
Democratic	Dan Ruck	3,295	28.30%
Republican	Wendy Nanney	8,325	71.51%
Total votes		11,642	100.0

=== District 23 ===
District 23 comprised a portion of Greenville County.

South Carolina House District 23 General Election, 2014
Party	Candidate	Votes	%
Write-in	N/A	108	2.18%
Democratic	Chandra Dillard	4,841	97.82%
Total votes		4,949	100.0

=== District 24 ===
District 24 comprised a portion of Greenville County.

South Carolina House District 24 General Election, 2014
Party	Candidate	Votes	%
Write-in	N/A	109	1.01%
Republican	Bruce W. Bannister	10,632	98.99%
Total votes		10,741	100.0

=== District 25 ===
District 25 comprised a portion of Greenville County.

South Carolina House District 25 General Election, 2014
Party	Candidate	Votes	%
Write-in	N/A	20	0.29%
Independent	Tony Boyce	1,628	23.82%
Democratic	Leola Robinson-Simpson	5,186	75.89%
Total votes		6,834	100.0

=== District 26 ===
District 26 comprised a portion of York County.

South Carolina House District 26 General Election, 2014
Party	Candidate	Votes	%
Write-in	N/A	29	0.32%
South Carolina Libertarian Party	Jeremy C. Walters	1,814	19.84%
Republican	Raye Felder	7,299	79.84%
Total votes		9,142	100.0

=== District 27 ===
District 27 comprised a portion of Greenville County.

South Carolina House District 27 General Election, 2014
Party	Candidate	Votes	%
Write-in	N/A	139	1.52%
Republican	Garry R. Smith	9,013	98.48%
Total votes		9,152	100.0

=== District 28 ===
District 28 comprised a portion of Greenville County.

South Carolina House District 28 General Election, 2014
Party	Candidate	Votes	%
Write-in	N/A	98	1.14%
Republican	Eric M. Bedingfield	8,475	98.86%
Total votes		8,573	100.0

=== District 29 ===
District 29 comprised portions of Cherokee, Chester, and York counties.

South Carolina House District 29 General Election, 2014
Party	Candidate	Votes	%
Write-in	N/A	74	1.03%
Republican	Dennis Carroll Moss	7,127	98.97%
Total votes		7,201	100.0

=== District 30 ===
District 30 comprised portions of Cherokee and York counties.

South Carolina House District 30 General Election, 2014
Party	Candidate	Votes	%
Write-in	N/A	31	0.48%
Republican	Steve Moss	6,398	99.52%
Total votes		6,429	100.0

=== District 31 ===
District 31 comprised a portion of Spartanburg County.

South Carolina House District 30 General Election, 2014
Party	Candidate	Votes	%
Write-in	N/A	63	1.26%
Democratic	Harold Mitchell Jr.	4,945	98.74%
Total votes		5,008	100.0

=== District 32 ===
District 32 comprised a portion of Spartanburg County.

South Carolina House District 32 General Election, 2014
Party	Candidate	Votes	%
Write-in	N/A	13	0.14%
Democratic	Matt Iyer	2,394	25.18%
Republican	Derham Cole	7,100	74.68%
Total votes		9,507	100.0

=== District 33 ===
District 33 comprised a portion of Spartanburg County.

South Carolina House District 33 General Election, 2014
Party	Candidate	Votes	%
Write-in	N/A	5	0.05%
Democratic	Shelia Antley Counts	1,996	21.15%
Republican	Eddie Tallon	7,435	78.79%
Total votes		9,436	100.0

=== District 34 ===
District 34 comprised a portion of Spartanburg County.

South Carolina House District 34 General Election, 2014
Party	Candidate	Votes	%
Write-in	N/A	21	0.22%
Democratic	Michael R. Thompson	3,385	34.68%
Republican	Mike Forrester	6,356	65.11%
Total votes		9,762	100.0

=== District 35 ===
District 35 comprised portions of Greenville and Spartanburg counties.

South Carolina House District 35 General Election, 2014
Party	Candidate	Votes	%
Write-in	N/A	93	1.01%
Republican	Bill Chumley	9,074	98.99%
Total votes		9,167	100.0

=== District 36 ===
District 26 comprised portions of Greenville and Spartanburg counties.

South Carolina House District 36 General Election, 2014
Party	Candidate	Votes	%
Write-in	N/A	105	1.64%
Republican	Rita Allison	6,307	98.36%
Total votes		6,412	100.0

=== District 37 ===
District 37 comprised portions of Spartanburg County.

South Carolina House District 37 General Election, 2014
Party	Candidate	Votes	%
Write-in	N/A	90	1.47%
Republican	Donna Hicks Wood	6,052	98.53%
Total votes		6,142	100.0

=== District 38 ===
District 38 comprised a portion of Spartanburg County.

South Carolina House District 38 General Election, 2014
Party	Candidate	Votes	%
Write-in	N/A	101	1.30%
Republican	N. Douglas Brannon	7,684	98.70%
Total votes		7,785	100.0

=== District 39 ===
District 39 comprised all of Saluda County and a portion of Lexington County.

South Carolina House District 39 General Election, 2014
Party	Candidate	Votes	%
Write-in	N/A	98	1.19%
Republican	Ralph Shealy Kennedy	8,170	98.81%
Total votes		8,268	100.0

=== District 40 ===
District 40 comprised all of Newberry County.

South Carolina House District 40 General Election, 2014
Party	Candidate	Votes	%
Write-in	N/A	3	0.03%
Republican	Richard Martin	4,388	39.84%
Democratic	Walt McLeod	6,623	60.13%
Total votes		11,014	100.0

=== District 41 ===
District 41 comprised all of Fairfield County and portions of Chester and Richland counties.

South Carolina House District 41 General Election, 2014
Party	Candidate	Votes	%
Write-in	N/A	107	1.06%
Democratic	MaryGail Douglas	10,007	98.94%
Total votes		10,114	100.0

=== District 42 ===
District 42 comprised all of Union County and a portion of Laurens County.

South Carolina House District 42 General Election, 2014
Party	Candidate	Votes	%
Write-in	N/A	14	0.14%
Republican	David Tribble	3,796	38.40%
Democratic	Mike Anthony	6,075	61.46%
Total votes		9,885	100.0

=== District 43 ===
District 43 comprised portions of Chester and York counties.

South Carolina House District 43 General Election, 2014
Party	Candidate	Votes	%
Write-in	N/A	77	1.13%
Republican	Greg Delleney	6,708	98.87%
Total votes		6,785	100.0

=== District 44 ===
District 44 comprised a portion of Lancaster County.

South Carolina House District 44 General Election, 2014
Party	Candidate	Votes	%
Write-in	N/A	146	2.14%
Democratic	Mandy Powers Norrell	6,671	97.86%
Total votes		6,817	100.0

=== District 45 ===
District 45 comprised portions of Lancaster and York counties.

South Carolina House District 45 General Election, 2014
Party	Candidate	Votes	%
Write-in	N/A	82	0.81%
Republican	Deborah Long	10,035	99.19%
Total votes		10,117	100.0

=== District 46 ===
District 46 comprised a portion of York County.

South Carolina House District 46 General Election, 2014
Party	Candidate	Votes	%
Write-in	N/A	120	1.47%
Republican	Gary Simrill	8,054	98.53%
Total votes		8,174	100.0

=== District 47 ===
District 47 comprised a portion of York County.

South Carolina House District 47 General Election, 2014
Party	Candidate	Votes	%
Write-in	N/A	62	0.81%
Republican	Tommy Pope	7,556	99.19%
Total votes		7,618	100.0

=== District 48 ===
District 48 comprised a portion of York County.

South Carolina House District 48 General Election, 2014
Party	Candidate	Votes	%
Write-in	N/A	8	0.08%
Democratic	Barry McGrew	2,762	26.68%
Republican	Ralph W. Norman	7,582	73.24%
Total votes		10,352	100.0

=== District 49 ===
District 49 comprised a portion of York County.

South Carolina House District 49 General Election, 2014
Party	Candidate	Votes	%
Write-in	N/A	6	0.08%
Republican	Robert Walker	2,427	30.90%
Democratic	John R. King	5,422	69.03%
Total votes		7,855	100.0

=== District 50 ===
District 50 comprised portions of Kershaw, Lee, and Sumter counties.

South Carolina House District 50 General Election, 2014
Party	Candidate	Votes	%
Write-in	N/A	128	1.47%
Democratic	Grady Brown	8,574	98.53%
Total votes		8,702	100.0

=== District 51 ===
District 51 comprised a portion of Sumter County.

South Carolina House District 51 General Election, 2014
Party	Candidate	Votes	%
Write-in	N/A	52	0.61%
Democratic	David Weeks	8,512	99.39%
Total votes		8,564	100.0

=== District 52 ===
District 52 comprised a portion of Kershaw County.

South Carolina House District 52 General Election, 2014
Party	Candidate	Votes	%
Write-in	N/A	122	1.18%
Democratic	Laurie Slade Funderburk	10,195	98.82%
Total votes		10,317	100.0

=== District 53 ===
District 53 comprised portions of Chesterfield and Lancaster counties.

South Carolina House District 53 General Election, 2014
Party	Candidate	Votes	%
Write-in	N/A	16	0.20%
Democratic	Amy M. Brown	3,183	40.52%
Republican	Richie Yow	4,657	59.28%
Total votes		7,856	100.0

=== District 54 ===
District 54 comprised portions of Chesterfield, Darlington, and Marlboro counties.

South Carolina House District 54 General Election, 2014
Party	Candidate	Votes	%
Write-in	N/A	118	1.73%
Republican	Patricia M. Pat Henegan	6,719	98.27%
Total votes		6,837	100.0

=== District 55 ===
District 55 comprised portions of Darlington, Dillon, Horry, and Marlboro counties.

=== District 56 ===
District 56 comprised a portion of Horry County.

=== District 57 ===
District 57 comprised portions of Dillon, Horry, and Marion counties.

=== District 58 ===
District 58 comprised a portion of Horry County.

=== District 59 ===
District 59 comprised portions of Darlington and Florence counties.

=== District 60 ===
District 60 comprised portions of Darlington and Florence counties.

=== District 61 ===
District 61 comprised portions of Florence and Marion counties.

=== District 62 ===
District 62 comprised portions of Darlington and Florence counties.

=== District 63 ===
District 63 comprised a portion of Florence County.

=== District 64 ===
District 64 comprised portions of Clarendon and Sumter counties.

=== District 65 ===
District 65 comprised portions of Chesterfield, Darlington, Kershaw, and Lancaster counties.

=== District 66 ===
District 66 comprised a portion of Orangeburg County.

=== District 67 ===
District 67 comprised a portion of Sumter County.

=== District 68 ===
District 68 comprised a portion of Horry County.

=== District 69 ===
District 69 comprised a portion of Lexington County.

=== District 70 ===
District 70 comprised portions of Richland and Sumter counties.

=== District 71 ===
District 71 comprised portions of Richland and Lexington counties.

=== District 72 ===
District 72 comprised a portion of Richland County.

=== District 73 ===
District 73 comprised a portion of Richland County.

=== District 74 ===
District 74 comprised a portion of Richland County.

=== District 75 ===
District 75 comprised a portion of Richland County.

=== District 76 ===
District 76 comprised a portion of Richland County.

=== District 77 ===
District 77 comprised a portion of Richland County.

=== District 78 ===
District 78 comprised a portion of Richland County.

=== District 79 ===
District 79 comprised a portion of Richland County.

=== District 80 ===
District 80 comprised a portion of Richland County.

=== District 81 ===
District 81 comprised a portion of Aiken County.

=== District 82 ===
District 82 comprised portions of Aiken, Edgefield, and Saluda counties.

=== District 83 ===
District 83 comprised portions of Aiken and Edgefield counties.

=== District 84 ===
District 84 comprised a portion of Aiken County. With the retirement of incumbent Rep. Roland Smith, multiple Republican candidates vied for the party's nomination.

South Carolina House District 84 Republican Primary Election, 2014
Party	Candidate	Votes	%
Republican	S Lance Weaver	50	2.13%
Republican	Rick Turnbull	427	18.21%
Republican	Adam Mestres	494	21.07%
Republican	Chris Corley	1,374	58.59%
Total votes		2,066	100.0

=== District 85 ===
District 85 comprised a portion of Lexington County.

=== District 86 ===
District 86 comprised a portion of Aiken County.

=== District 87 ===
District 87 comprised a portion of Lexington County.

=== District 88 ===
District 88 comprised a portion of Lexington County.

=== District 89 ===
District 88 comprised a portion of Lexington County.

=== District 90 ===
District 90 comprised portions of Bamberg, Barnwell, and Colleton counties.

=== District 91 ===
District 91 comprised portions of Allendale, Barnwell, and Orangeburg counties.

=== District 92 ===
District 92 comprised a portion of Berkeley County.

=== District 93 ===
District 93 comprised portions of Calhoun, Lexington, and Orangeburg counties.

=== District 94 ===
District 94 comprised portions of Charleston and Dorchester counties.

=== District 95 ===
District 95 comprised a portion of Orangeburg County.

=== District 96 ===
District 96 comprised a portion of Lexington County.

=== District 97 ===
District 97 comprised portions of Colleton and Dorchester counties.

=== District 98 ===
District 98 comprised a portion of Dorchester County.

=== District 99 ===
District 99 comprised portions of Berkeley and Charleston counties.

=== District 100 ===
District 100 comprised a portion of Berkeley County.

=== District 101 ===
District 101 comprised portions of Clarendon and Williamsburg counties.

=== District 102 ===
District 102 comprised portions of Berkeley and Dorchester counties.

=== District 103 ===
District 103 comprised portions of Georgetown, Horry, and Williamsburg counties.

=== District 104 ===
District 104 comprised a portion of Horry County.

=== District 105 ===
District 105 comprised a portion of Horry County.

=== District 106 ===
District 106 comprised a portion of Horry County.

=== District 107 ===
District 107 comprised a portion of Horry County.

=== District 108 ===
District 108 comprised portions of Charleston and Georgetown counties.

=== District 109 ===
District 108 comprised portions of Charleston and Dorchester counties.

=== District 110 ===
District 110 comprised a portion of Charleston County.

=== District 111 ===
District 111 comprised a portion of Charleston County.

=== District 112 ===
District 112 comprised a portion of Charleston County.

=== District 113 ===
District 113 comprised portions of Charleston and Dorchester counties.

=== District 114 ===
District 114 comprised portions of Charleston and Dorchester counties.

=== District 115 ===
District 115 comprised a portion of Charleston County.

=== District 116 ===
District 116 comprised portions of Charleston and Colleton counties.

=== District 117 ===
District 117 comprised portions of Charleston and Berkeley counties.

=== District 118 ===
District 118 comprised portions of Beaufort and Jasper counties.

=== District 119 ===
District 119 comprised a portion of Charleston County.

=== District 120 ===
District 120 comprised portions of Beaufort and Jasper counties.

=== District 121 ===
District 121 comprised portions of Beaufort and Colleton counties.

=== District 122 ===
District 122 comprised portions of Beaufort, Hampton, and Jasper counties.

=== District 123 ===
District 123 comprised a portion of Beaufort County.

=== District 124 ===
District 124 comprised a portion of Beaufort County.
