= RJ May =

American former politician and convicted child sex offender (born 1986)

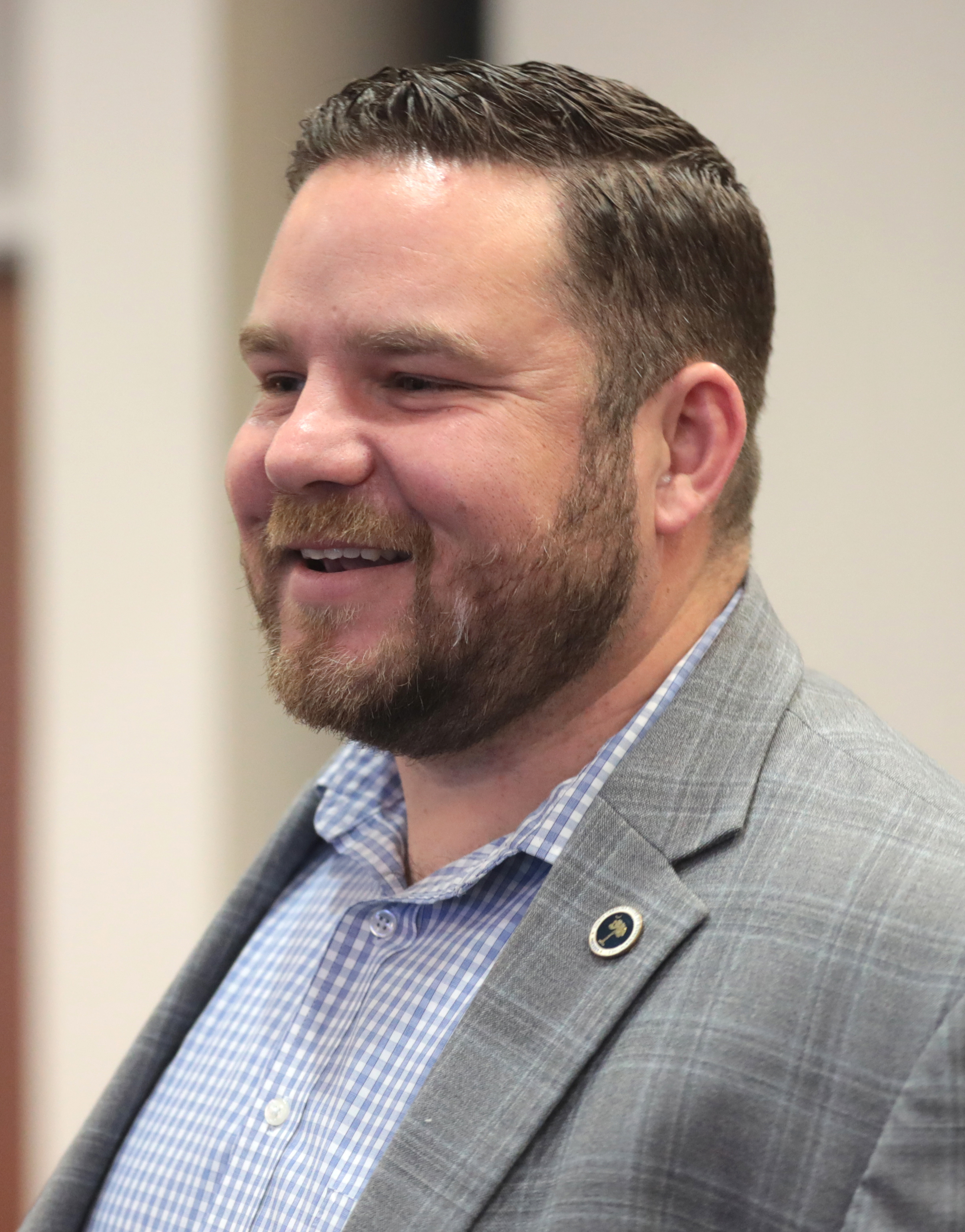
- May in 2022
- Conviction: September 29, 2025 (pleaded guilty)
- Criminal charge: Distribution of child sex abuse material
- Penalty: 17.5 years in prison, 20 years supervised release, lifetime registration as a sex offender, $58,400 restitution

Member of the South Carolina House of Representatives from the 88th district
- In office November 9, 2020 – August 11, 2025
- Preceded by: McLain Toole
- Succeeded by: John Thomas Lastinger

Personal details
- Born: Robert John May III; October 18, 1986 (age 39) Newport News, Virginia, U.S.
- Party: Republican
- Spouse: Beth (m. 2016, divorced 2026)
- Children: 2
- Education: University of South Carolina (BA); Tel Aviv University (MA)

Robert John May III (born October 18, 1986) is an American former politician who was a member of the South Carolina House of Representatives from the 88th District from 2020 until 2025. He is a member of the Republican Party. On June 12, 2025, the speaker of the South Carolina House of Representatives suspended May after he was indicted, arrested, arraigned and held without bail on ten federal counts of possessing and distributing child sexual abuse material. May resigned his seat on August 11, 2025. On September 29, 2025, May pleaded guilty to five counts of distributing sexual abuse material involving children and on January 14, 2026, was sentenced to more than 17 years in federal prison, with stipulations including payment of restitution to victims.

== Education and career ==
May was born in Newport News, Virginia. He received a Bachelor of Arts from the University of South Carolina and a Master of Arts in security and diplomacy from Tel Aviv University.

He served as executive director of the South Carolina Club for Growth and on Catherine Templeton's 2018 gubernatorial campaign, as well as founding political consulting firm Ivory Tusk Consulting.

== Political career ==
=== 2020 SC House of Representatives election ===
May ran for the South Carolina House of Representatives in 2020 in the 88th district, where incumbent Republican McLain Toole was retiring. He placed second in the Republican primary election with 24.5% of the vote, then defeated Michael Sturkie in the runoff election with 53.2% of the vote. He was elected unopposed in the general election.

=== Committee assignments, South Carolina Freedom Caucus leadership ===
In 2021 May was elected as the vice chairman of the South Carolina Freedom Caucus. He also served on the House Agriculture, Natural Resources & Environmental Affairs Committee, and on its Environmental Affairs subcommittee.

May told the House in January 2024 regarding transgender issues and children: "We as legislators have an obligation to ensure that our children have no harm done to them".

=== 2024 SC House of Representatives election ===
May faced a write-in candidate, Republican Brian Duncan, in his SC House race. He was re-elected with 68% of the vote. On Tuesday, December 3, 2024, May was sworn in and took his seat in the State House.

=== 2025 SC House Ethics Committee proceedings ===
On July 1, 2025, after May's June indictment and arrest, the South Carolina House Ethics Committee voted to open an ethics investigation into item C2025-001: "potential misuse of office and alleged conduct unbecoming of a member". House rules do not allow the identity of the member to be revealed during the investigation. House Ethics Chairman Jay Jordan retained outside attorneys to avoid a conflict of interest, and hoped the investigation would be completed in 2025. The Committee met for an hour, with some time spent in executive session. Members of the 2025 House Ethics Committee were J. David Weeks (vice chairman), Paula Rawl Calhoon, Neal A. Collins, Val Guest, Beth E. Bernstein (secretary), John Richard C. King, Robert D. Robbins. J. Todd Rutherford, and Leon Stavrinakis.

On July 9, 2025, Brian Duncan, who in 2024 had organized an unsuccessful write-in campaign for the District 88 seat, called on May to resign so that a special election could be held to fill the seat.

On August 20, 2025, a meeting of the House Ethics Committee with item C2025-001 on the agenda was set for a meeting held on August 26.

On October 14, the Committee revealed that May was the subject of their investigation, and they found violations that, had he remained in office, would have been grounds for May's expulsion.

=== 2025 resignation ===
On August 11, 2025, May issued a statement confirming his resignation from the District 88 seat. SC House Speaker Murrell Smith Jr. confirmed May's resignation and released a copy of his statement to the press. The resignation came after an Oklahoma man was indicted with allegations that he had exchanged child sex abuse materials with May.

=== 2025 SC House special election ===
Special election dates for the SC House District 88 seat were set for filing: opening August 29 and ending September 6; primaries on October 21, and special election held on December 23, 2025.

Republican Brian Duncan announced his run for the special election seat. Others who filed along with Duncan: Lorelei Graye (Republican), Chuck Hightower (Democratic), John Thomas Lastinger (Republican) and Darren Rogers Sr. (Republican). Duncan and Lastinger earned spots in the Republican Primary runoff, with Lastinger the runoff winner. Lastinger faced and defeated Democrat Chuck Hightower in December.

== Legal issues, prosecution and sentencing ==
=== Distribution of child sexual abuse material ===
On May 27, 2024, the National Center for Missing and Exploited Children received a cyber tip from Kik Messenger flagging videos from username "joebidennnn69" as depicting child sexual abuse material (CSAM) portraying "infant and toddler children being subjected to severe forms of sex abuse" involving physical violence and animals, according to a statement from the United States Attorney for the District of South Carolina Bryan Stirling. The Kik account, which, prosecutors linked to May, had been used to disburse child sexual abuse videos around the world.

In August 2024 May's house was searched as part of the investigation by members of the Department of Homeland Security's (DHS) Special Investigations Unit (HSI) along with support from the South Carolina State Law Enforcement Division (SLED), with 35 electronic devices seized, including May's phone.

On October 24, 2024, a federal document was filed in US District Court for South Carolina with a motion to extend time to file judicial forfeiture action. In December 2024, May was suspended from the South Carolina Freedom Caucus amid the ongoing investigation.

==== Indictment and arrest ====
On June 10, 2025, May was indicted by a federal grand jury on 10 counts of federal child sex abuse charges. Then on June 11, 2025, May was arrested and booked into Lexington County Detention Center. Jordan Pace, chair of the South Carolina Freedom Caucus, issued a statement calling for May's immediate resignation.

On June 12, 2025, May was suspended without pay from the South Carolina House of Representatives as required by state law, pending the case's outcome, according to a document from House Speaker Murrell Smith Jr.'s office. An arraignment was held before United States Magistrate Judge Shiva V. Hodges, during which evidence was presented by a representative of the Department of Homeland Security, and bond for May was denied. May pled not guilty and was detained without bail.

On June 13, 2025, the South Carolina House Republican Caucus issued a statement from House Majority Leader Davey Hiott noting that Hiott had filed a complaint with the House Ethics Committee to further investigate May, a procedure which started the process of expulsion from the House of Representatives. The letter further noted that May was not a member of the SC House Republican Caucus, but was instead a creator and member of the "fringe" South Carolina Freedom Caucus. Drew McKissick, chair of the South Carolina Republican Party, released a statement demanding that May resign his seat in the House of Representatives. The Attorney General of South Carolina Alan Wilson also released a statement affirming that the investigation of May was conducted by federal partners who are members of the South Carolina Internet Crimes Against Children Task Force. Governor Henry McMaster called the charges "horrific." Commenting on whether May should resign his seat, the governor remarked "that question's going to be answered for him" if the House of Representatives passes an expulsion by a two-thirds vote.

==== Court proceedings ====
On June 24, 2025, May appeared before a federal judge without legal counsel. He requested and was assigned a court appointed public defender. May presented a financial affidavit stating that he had no assets in his name other than his truck. Assistant federal public defender Jenny Smith was appointed to represent May, taking over from Columbia attorney Dayne Phillips. The federal case was assigned to Senior U.S. District Court Judge Cameron McGowan Currie. May was held at Edgefield County Detention Center.

===== Request for delay =====
On August 11, 2025, Smith submitted a request to the court to delay proceedings to give her time to review discovery, investigate, review findings with the defendant, and give all parties time to possibly negotiate a resolution.

Jury selection was previously set for September 10, 2025, but on August 20, the schedule was reset by federal Judge Currie for October 8, 2025, with opening arguments on October 9. Smith planned to challenge the search warrant used to seize electronics from May's home in August 2024.

===== May opts to represent self =====
On September 4, 2025, May was granted permission at a status hearing in federal court to represent himself, rather than rely on the services of a public defender. Self representation required May to complete pretrial filings from his jail cell. May's request for hybrid counsel allowed to sit at the table with him was denied in favor of standby counsel, who sit behind him for trial proceedings.

May's public defenders, Jenny Smith and Jeremy Thompson, served in the limited standby role. Assistant US Attorney Scott Matthews noted that there were seven total warrants, one of which May moved to suppress, causing him to seek self representation. Matthews, Assistant U.S. Attorney Dean Secor and Austin M. Berry, an attorney with the Child Exploitation and Obscenity Section of the United States Department of Justice Criminal Division were prosecutors in the case.

===== Motions, guilty plea, sentencing and incarceration =====
On September 10, 2025, May filed a motion to suppress evidence against him. On September 17, he filed for a change of venue due to "pre-trial publicity."

On September 24, 2025, after arguing for the motions before US District Judge Cameron McGowan Currie, May approached prosecutors about a guilty plea. May met with prosecutors and agreed to plead guilty to five counts of distributing sexual abuse material involving children. He faced up to 20 years in prison on each charge, for a total of 100 possible years, and a fine of up to $250,000, as well as being required to register as a sex offender. Prosecutors agreed to drop the remaining five counts in the plea deal with May. Assistant US attorney Scott Matthews signed the plea deal on September 26, representing himself, US Attorney Bryan Stirling, Elliott B. Daniels and Austin M. Berry. A plea hearing was set for September 29. At that plea hearing, May pled guilty, admitting to distributing hundreds of child sexual abuse videos and images. His sentencing hearing was scheduled for January 14, 2026.

On January 9, 2026, federal prosecutors filed a sentencing memo asking Judge Currie to order a 20 year prison sentence, lifetime supervision, and $73,000 in restitution.

On January 14, 2026, at May's sentencing hearing, US District Judge Currie sentenced him to 17.5 years in federal prison, lifetime registration as a sex offender, and payment of $58,500 in restitution. Due to his status as a convicted felon, he lost his right to vote, and will never be able to hold elected office again. He will serve 20 years' of supervised release after completing his prison sentence. May is serving his sentence at Federal Correctional Institution, Loretto, a low to minimum security federal prison in Lewisburg, Pennsylvania.

==== Appeal ====
On January 27, 2026, May filed an appeal of his conviction, citing "ineffective counsel" regarding his public defense attorneys to the United States Court of Appeals for the Fourth Circuit Court.

=== Tax evasion ===
On November 21, 2025, the South Carolina Department of Revenue filed charges against May for tax evasion. The Department found that between 2022 and 2024, May earned more than $323,000 and owes the state over $14,000. If convicted of these charges, May faces a maximum sentence for each count of one additional year in prison and a $10,000 fine plus the cost of prosecution.

== Impacts ==
In January 2026, South Carolina legislators considered harsher penalties and sentences for child sexual abuse.
