= John Thomas Lastinger =

American politician

Member of the South Carolina House of Representatives from the 88th district
- Incumbent
- Assumed office January 6, 2026
- Preceded by: RJ May

Personal details
- Party: Republican
- Profession: Pastor

John Thomas Lastinger is an American politician and pastor who is a member of the South Carolina House of Representatives from the 88th District since January 6, 2026. He is a member of the Republican Party.

== Education and career ==
Lastinger was born in Lexington County, South Carolina and has served as pastor of The Edge Church in Springdale, South Carolina for 47 years.

== Political career ==
=== 2025 SC House Special election ===
On August 11, 2025, Republican incumbent R.J. May issued a statement confirming his resignation from the District 88 seat. SC House Speaker Murrell Smith Jr. confirmed May's resignation and released a copy of his statement to the press.

Special election dates for the SC House District 88 seat set for filing opened August 29 and ended September 6; a Republican primary was held on October 21(no Democratic primary,with only one Democrat filing) and the special election on December 23, 2025.

Republican Brian Duncan announced his run for the special election seat. Others who filed along with Duncan: Lastinger, Lorelei Graye (Republican), Chuck Hightower (Democratic), and Darren Rogers Sr. (Republican). Duncan and Lastinger earned spots in the Republican Primary runoff, with Lastinger the runoff winner. Lastinger faced and defeated Democrat Chuck Hightower in December.

Lastinger was endorsed by Rep. Jay Kilmartin, a member of the South Carolina Freedom Caucus, however, Lastinger has confirmed on several occasions that he is not affiliated with the caucus.

=== First term in office ===
Lastinger serves on the House Medical, Military, Public and Municipal Affairs Committee and on its Military and Veterans subcommittee.
