= 2020 South Carolina House of Representatives election =

- November 3, 2020

All 124 seats in the South Carolina House of Representatives 62 seats needed for a majority
- Turnout: 63.16% ▲8.13 pp
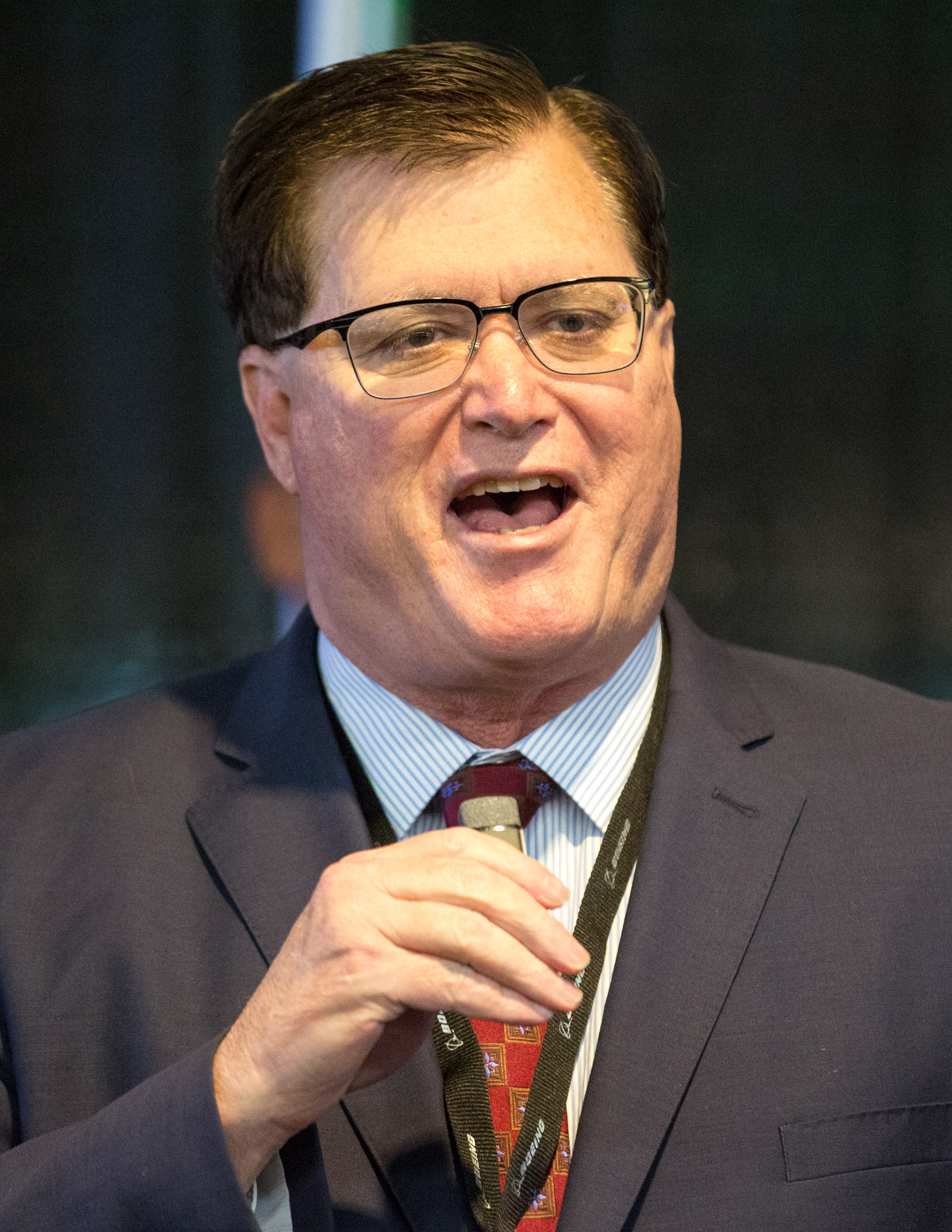

	Majority party	Minority party
Leader	Jay Lucas	J. Todd Rutherford
Party	Republican	Democratic
Leader since	December 2, 2014	January 8, 2013
Leader's seat	121st	101st
Last election	80, 58.48%	44, 38.53%
Seats before	79	45
Seats won	81	43
Seat change	▲2	▼2
Popular vote	1,402,989	779,644
Percentage	62.62%	34.80%
Swing	▲4.14%	▼3.73%
- Results: Democratic hold Republican hold Republican gain
Speaker before election
Jay Lucas
Republican
Elected Speaker
Jay Lucas
Republican

The 2020 South Carolina House of Representatives elections took place as part of the biennial United States elections. South Carolina voters have elected state representatives in all 123 of the state house's districts.

Primary elections were held beforehand.

== Predictions ==
Source	Ranking	As of
The Cook Political Report	Safe R	October 21, 2020

== Results ==
Party	Votes		Seats		
Party	No.	%	No.	+/−	%
South Carolina Republican Party	1,402,989	62.62	81	+1	65.32
South Carolina Democratic Party	779,644	34.80	43	-1	33.87
Write-in	28,855	1.29	0	0	0.00
Libertarian Party of South Carolina	17,443	0.78	0	0	0.00
Alliance Party of South Carolina	7,150	0.32	0	0	0.00
South Carolina Constitution Party	1,805	0.08	0	0	0.00
Labor Party	1,650	0.07	0	0	0.00
Independent	599	0.03	0	0	0.00
South Carolina Green Party	256	0.01	0	0	0.00
Total	2,240,391	100.00	124	±0	100.00
Registered voters	3,547,181	100.00			
Turnout	2,240,391	63.16			
Source: South Carolina Election Commission

Popular vote
Republican	62.62%
Democratic	34.80%
Other	2.58%

House seats
Republican	65.32%
Democratic	33.87%

== Margins of victory ==
District	Winning party	Margin
3	Republican	31.28%
7	Republican	52.38%
8	Republican	61.98%
12	Democratic	18.2%
13	Republican	43.34%
15	Democratic	3.74%
18	Republican	47.71%
19	Republican	22.19%
20	Republican	35.15%
22	Republican	27.12%
25	Democratic	39.03%
26	Republican	19.91%
28	Republican	30.36%
33	Republican	77.5%
35	Republican	36.07%
41	Democratic	29.7%
43	Republican	36.52%
44	Republican	10.5%
45	Republican	27.74%
47	Republican	46.82%
48	Republican	21.84%
49	Democratic	27.94%
52	Republican	3.27%
54	Democratic	10.79%
56	Republican	30.97%
60	Republican	22.78%
63	Republican	29.46%
64	Democratic	8.7%
66	Democratic	39.97%
68	Republican	69.45%
71	Republican	32.19%
73	Democratic	56.4%
74	Democratic	65.84%
75	Republican	1.49%
77	Democratic	67.68%
78	Democratic	31.9%
79	Democratic	74.34%
80	Democratic	39.01%
83	Republican	40.31%
90	Democratic	0.37%
94	Republican	22.15%
95	Democratic	74.57%
97	Democratic	24.6%
99	Republican	28.65%
107	Republican	32.79%
109	Democratic	61.87%
110	Republican	21.42%
111	Democratic	58.37%
112	Republican	15.06%
114	Republican	8.87%
115	Democratic	1.59%
116	Democratic	1.74%
117	Democratic	5.34%
118	Democratic	23.5%
119	Democratic	39.7%
121	Democratic	26.66%
122	Democratic	13.97%
123	Republican	25.04%
124	Republican	26.59%

Uncontested elections are not included.

== Detailed Results by District ==
=== District 1 ===
1st District General Election, 2020
Party	Candidate	Votes	%
Republican	Bill Whitmire (incumbent)	17,308	98.71
Write-in		227	1.29
Total votes		17,535	100.0
Republican hold			

=== District 2 ===
2nd District General Election, 2020
Party	Candidate	Votes	%
Republican	Bill Sandifer (incumbent)	17,061	97.78
Write-in		388	2.22
Total votes		17,449	100.0
Republican hold			

=== District 3 ===
3rd District General Election, 2020
Party	Candidate	Votes	%
Republican	Jerry Carter	9,214	65.57
Democratic	Eunice Lehmacher	4,819	34.29
Write-in		20	0.14
Total votes		14,053	100.0
Republican hold			

=== District 4 ===
4th District General Election, 2020
Party	Candidate	Votes	%
Republican	Davey Hiott (incumbent)	18,479	98.80
Write-in		225	1.20
Total votes		18,704	100.0
Republican hold			

=== District 5 ===
5th District General Election, 2020
Party	Candidate	Votes	%
Republican	Neal Collins (incumbent)	17,845	97.76
Write-in		408	2.24
Total votes		18,253	100.0
Republican hold			

=== District 6 ===
6th District General Election, 2020
Party	Candidate	Votes	%
Republican	Brian White (incumbent)	16,926	97.35
Write-in		461	2.65
Total votes		17,387	100.0
Republican hold			

=== District 7 ===
7th District General Election, 2020
Party	Candidate	Votes	%
Republican	Jay West (incumbent)	12,280	76.15
Democratic	Andrea Bejarano-Robinson	3,833	23.77
Write-in		13	0.08
Total votes		16,126	100.0
Republican hold			

=== District 8 ===
8th District General Election, 2020
Party	Candidate	Votes	%
Republican	Jonathon Hill (incumbent)	14,099	80.73
Alliance	Jackie Todd	3,274	18.75
Write-in		92	0.53
Total votes		16,126	100.0
Republican hold			

=== District 9 ===
9th District General Election, 2020
Party	Candidate	Votes	%
Republican	Anne Thayer (incumbent)	14,222	97.56
Write-in		356	2.44
Total votes		14,578	100.0
Republican hold			

=== District 10 ===
10th District General Election, 2020
Party	Candidate	Votes	%
Republican	West Cox (incumbent)	18,952	97.99
Write-in		388	2.01
Total votes		19,340	100.0
Republican hold			

=== District 11 ===
11th District General Election, 2020
Party	Candidate	Votes	%
Republican	Craig A. Gagnon (incumbent)	13,024	98.46
Write-in		204	1.54
Total votes		13,228	100.0
Republican hold			

=== District 12 ===
12th District General Election, 2020
Party	Candidate	Votes	%
Democratic	Anne Parks (incumbent)	8,446	58.16
Republican	James Pearman	5,804	39.96
Green	Robbie Bryant	256	1.76
Write-in		17	0.12
Total votes		14,523	100.0
Democratic hold			

=== District 13 ===
13th District General Election, 2020
Party	Candidate	Votes	%
Republican	John McCravy (incumbent)	14,115	71.62
Democratic	Denuse Waldrep	5,574	28.28
Write-in		18	0.09
Total votes		19,707	100.0
Republican hold			

=== District 14 ===
14th District General Election, 2020
Party	Candidate	Votes	%
Republican	Stewart O Jones (incumbent)	15,679	97.49
Write-in		403	2.51
Total votes		16,082	100.0
Republican hold			

=== District 15 ===
15th District General Election, 2020
Party	Candidate	Votes	%
Democratic	J.A. Moore (incumbent)	7,573	51.81
Republican	Samuel Rivers Jr	7,027	48.07
Write-in		17	0.12
Total votes		14,617	100.0
Democratic hold			

=== District 16 ===
16th District General Election, 2020
Party	Candidate	Votes	%
Republican	Mark N Willis (incumbent)	15,368	96.79
Write-in		509	3.21
Total votes		15,877	100.0
Republican hold			

=== District 17 ===
17th District General Election, 2020
Party	Candidate	Votes	%
Republican	Mike Burns (incumbent)	19,269	97.98
Write-in		397	2.02
Total votes		19,666	100.0
Republican hold			

=== District 18 ===
18th District General Election, 2020
Party	Candidate	Votes	%
Republican	Tommy Stringer (incumbent)	17,172	73.80
Democratic	Benjamin Smith	6,070	26.09
Write-in		26	0.11
Total votes		23,268	100.0
Republican hold			

=== District 19 ===
19th District General Election, 2020
Party	Candidate	Votes	%
Republican	Patrick B Haddon	9,767	61.06
Democratic	Jevarus Howard	6,218	38.87
Write-in		12	0.08
Total votes		15,997	100.0
Republican hold			

=== District 20 ===
20th District General Election, 2020
Party	Candidate	Votes	%
Republican	Adam Morgan (incumbent)	14,632	67.54
Democratic	Stephen Dreyfus	7,016	32.39
Write-in		15	0.07
Total votes		21,663	100.0
Republican hold			

=== District 21 ===
21st District General Election, 2020
Party	Candidate	Votes	%
Republican	Bobby Cox (incumbent)	19,851	97.03
Write-in		607	2.97
Total votes		20,458	100.0
Republican hold			

=== District 22 ===
22nd District General Election, 2020
Party	Candidate	Votes	%
Republican	Jason Elliott (incumbent)	13,542	63.41
Democratic	B K Brown	7,750	36.29
Write-in		63	0.30
Total votes		21,355	100.0
Republican hold			

=== District 23 ===
23rd District General Election, 2020
Party	Candidate	Votes	%
Democratic	Chandra Dillard (incumbent)	11,530	96.68
Write-in		396	3.32
Total votes		11,926	100.0
Democratic hold			

=== District 24 ===
24th District General Election, 2020
Party	Candidate	Votes	%
Republican	Bruce W Bannister (incumbent)	18,515	96.46
Write-in		679	3.54
Total votes		19,194	100.0
Republican hold			

=== District 25 ===
25th District General Election, 2020
Party	Candidate	Votes	%
Democratic	Leola Simpson (incumbent)	10,540	67.53
Republican	Darath Mackie	4,448	28.50
Independent	Tony Boyce	599	3.84
Write-in		20	0.13
Total votes		15,607	100.0
Democratic hold			

=== District 26 ===
26th District General Election, 2020
Party	Candidate	Votes	%
Republican	Raye Felder (incumbent)	17,576	59.92
Democratic	Monica Danneman	11,735	40.01
Write-in		20	0.07
Total votes		29,331	100.0
Republican hold			

=== District 27 ===
27th District General Election, 2020
Party	Candidate	Votes	%
Republican	Garry Smith (incumbent)	16,482	96.54
Write-in		591	3.46
Total votes		17,073	100.0
Republican hold			

=== District 28 ===
28th District General Election, 2020
Party	Candidate	Votes	%
Republican	Ashley Trantham (incumbent)	15,990	65.13
Democratic	Ty Washington	8,537	34.77
Write-in		24	0.10
Total votes		24,551	100.0
Republican hold			

=== District 29 ===
29th District General Election, 2020
Party	Candidate	Votes	%
Republican	Dennis Moss (incumbent)	15,542	98.26
Write-in		270	1.74
Total votes		15,818	100.0
Republican hold			

=== District 30 ===
30th District General Election, 2020
Party	Candidate	Votes	%
Republican	Steve Moss (incumbent)	14,085	98.28
Write-in		247	1.72
Total votes		14,332	100.0
Republican hold			

=== District 31 ===
31st District General Election, 2020
Party	Candidate	Votes	%
Democratic	Rosalyn Henderson-Myers (incumbent)	10,133	97.95
Write-in		212	2.05
Total votes		10,345	100.0
Democratic hold			

=== District 32 ===
32nd District General Election, 2020
Party	Candidate	Votes	%
Republican	Max Hyde (incumbent)	15,330	97.20
Write-in		441	2.80
Total votes		15,771	100.0
Republican hold			

=== District 33 ===
33rd District General Election, 2020
Party	Candidate	Votes	%
Republican	Travis Moore	14,896	88.19
Constitution	Thomas J Riddle	1,805	10.69
Write-in		190	1.12
Total votes		16,891	100.0
Republican hold			

=== District 34 ===
34th District General Election, 2020
Party	Candidate	Votes	%
Republican	Roger A Nutt	15,017	95.69
Write-in		677	4.31
Total votes		15,694	100.0
Republican hold			

=== District 35 ===
35th District General Election, 2020
Party	Candidate	Votes	%
Republican	Bill Chumley (incumbent)	19,296	67.95
Democratic	Helen Pendarvis	9,053	31.88
Write-in		48	0.17
Total votes		28,397	100.0
Republican hold			

=== District 36 ===
36th District General Election, 2020
Party	Candidate	Votes	%
Republican	Rita Allison (incumbent)	14,923	97.05
Write-in		453	2.95
Total votes		15,376	100.0
Republican hold			

=== District 37 ===
37th District General Election, 2020
Party	Candidate	Votes	%
Republican	Steven W Long (incumbent)	15,690	97.00
Write-in		486	3.00
Total votes		16,176	100.0
Republican hold			

=== District 38 ===
38th District General Election, 2020
Party	Candidate	Votes	%
Republican	Josiah Magnuson (incumbent)	18,526	97.57
Write-in		461	2.43
Total votes		18,987	100.0
Republican hold			

=== District 39 ===
39th District General Election, 2020
Party	Candidate	Votes	%
Republican	Cal Forrest (incumbent)	14,992	98.55
Write-in		220	1.45
Total votes		15,212	100.0
Republican hold			

=== District 40 ===
40th District General Election, 2020
Party	Candidate	Votes	%
Republican	Rick Martin (incumbent)	14,024	97.70
Write-in		330	2.30
Total votes		14,354	100.0
Republican hold			

=== District 41 ===
41st District General Election, 2020
Party	Candidate	Votes	%
Democratic	Annie E McDaniel (incumbent)	12,573	64.77
Republican	Jennifer Brecheisen	6,808	35.07
Write-in		30	0.15
Total votes		19,411	100.0
Democratic hold			

=== District 42 ===
42nd District General Election, 2020
Party	Candidate	Votes	%
Republican	Doug Gilliam (incumbent)	13,087	98.02
Write-in		265	1.98
Total votes		13,352	100.0
Republican hold			

=== District 43 ===
43rd District General Election, 2020
Party	Candidate	Votes	%
Republican	Randy Ligon (incumbent)	12,439	68.23
Democratic	Reid Carrico	5,781	31.71
Write-in		12	0.07
Total votes		18,232	100.0
Republican hold			

=== District 44 ===
44th District General Election, 2020
Party	Candidate	Votes	%
Republican	Sandy McGarry	9,220	55.21
Democratic	Mandy Powers Norrell (incumbent)	7,466	44.71
Write-in		13	0.08
Total votes		16,699	100.0
Republican gain from Democratic			

=== District 45 ===
45th District General Election, 2020
Party	Candidate	Votes	%
Republican	Brandon Newton (incumbent)	23,974	63.83
Democratic	Jeith T Grey Sr	13,554	36.09
Write-in		30	0.08
Total votes		37,558	100.0
Republican hold			

=== District 46 ===
46th District General Election, 2020
Party	Candidate	Votes	%
Republican	Gary Simrill (incumbent)	15,773	95.33
Write-in		773	4.67
Total votes		16,546	100.0
Republican hold			

=== District 47 ===
47th District General Election, 2020
Party	Candidate	Votes	%
Republican	Tommy Pope (incumbent)	17,569	73.35
Democratic	Ryan McKenzie Arioli	6,355	26.53
Write-in		29	0.21
Total votes		23,953	100.0
Republican hold			

=== District 48 ===
48th District General Election, 2020
Party	Candidate	Votes	%
Republican	Bruce M. Bryant (incumbent)	15,527	60.88
Democratic	Kathryn Roberts	9,957	39.04
Write-in		19	0.07
Total votes		25,503	100.0
Republican hold			

=== District 49 ===
49th District General Election, 2020
Party	Candidate	Votes	%
Democratic	John R King (incumbent)	11,179	63.46
TOTAL	Johnny Walker	6,421	36.45
Republican	Johnny Walker	6,257	35.52
Alliance	Johnny Walker	164	0.93
Write-in		16	0.09
Total votes		17,616	100.0
Democratic hold			

=== District 50 ===
50th District General Election, 2020
Party	Candidate	Votes	%
Democratic	Will Wheeler	12,628	97.36
Write-in		343	2.46
Total votes		12,971	100.0
Democratic hold			

=== District 51 ===
51st District General Election, 2020
Party	Candidate	Votes	%
Democratic	David Weeks	12,708	98.50
Write-in		193	1.50
Total votes		12,901	100.0
Democratic hold			

=== District 52 ===
52nd District General Election, 2020
Party	Candidate	Votes	%
Republican	Vic Dabney	11,218	51.60
Democratic	Laurie Slade Funderburk (incumbent)	10,508	48.33
Write-in		16	0.07
Total votes		21,742	100.0
Republican gain from Democratic			

=== District 53 ===
53rd District General Election, 2020
Party	Candidate	Votes	%
Republican	Richard L Richie Yow (incumbent)	11,007	97.85
Write-in		242	2.15
Total votes		11,249	100.0
Republican hold			

=== District 54 ===
54th District General Election, 2020
Party	Candidate	Votes	%
Democratic	Patricia Moore Pat Henegan (incumbent)	8,304	55.36
Republican	Sterling McDiarmid	6,686	44.57
Write-in		10	0.07
Total votes		15,000	100.0
Democratic hold			

=== District 55 ===
55th District General Election, 2020
Party	Candidate	Votes	%
Democratic	Jackie E Hayes (incumbent)	11,168	96.69
Write-in		382	3.31
Total votes		11,550	100.0
Democratic hold			

=== District 56 ===
56th District General Election, 2020
Party	Candidate	Votes	%
Republican	Tim McGinnis (incumbent)	17,223	65.45
Democratic	Bruce Fischer	9,072	34.48
Write-in		19	0.07
Total votes		26,314	100.0
Republican hold			

=== District 57 ===
57th District General Election, 2020
Party	Candidate	Votes	%
Democratic	Lucas Atkinson (incumbent)	13,391	97.13
Write-in		395	2.87
Total votes		13,786	100.0
Democratic hold			

=== District 58 ===
58th District General Election, 2020
Party	Candidate	Votes	%
Republican	Jeff Johnson (incumbent)	16,358	98.52
Write-in		246	1.48
Total votes		16,604	100.0
Republican hold			

=== District 59 ===
59th District General Election, 2020
Party	Candidate	Votes	%
Democratic	Terry Alexander (incumbent)	12,857	97.96
Write-in		268	2.04
Total votes		13,125	100.0
Democratic hold			

=== District 60 ===
60th District General Election, 2020
Party	Candidate	Votes	%
Republican	Phillip Lowe (incumbent)	10,834	61.37
Democratic	Teresa McGill Cain	6,812	38.59
Write-in		7	0.04
Total votes		17,653	100.0
Republican hold			

=== District 61 ===
61st District General Election, 2020
Party	Candidate	Votes	%
Democratic	Roger Kirby (incumbent)	10,624	97.77
Write-in		242	2.23
Total votes		10,866	100.0
Democratic hold			

=== District 62 ===
62nd District General Election, 2020
Party	Candidate	Votes	%
Democratic	Robert Williams (incumbent)	13,063	97.36
Write-in		354	2.64
Total votes		13,417	100.0
Democratic hold			

=== District 63 ===
63rd District General Election, 2020
Party	Candidate	Votes	%
Republican	Jay Jordan (incumbent)	12,998	64.67
Democratic	Isaac Wilson	7,077	35.21
Write-in		23	0.11
Total votes		20,098	100.0
Republican hold			

=== District 64 ===
64th District General Election, 2020
Party	Candidate	Votes	%
Democratic	Kimberly O Johnson	9,446	54.31
Republican	Cindy Risher	7,933	45.61
Write-in		14	0.08
Total votes		17,393	100.0
Democratic hold			

=== District 65 ===
65th District General Election, 2020
Party	Candidate	Votes	%
Republican	Jay Lucas (incumbent)	13,942	98.51
Write-in		211	1.49
Total votes		14,153	100.0
Republican hold			

=== District 66 ===
66th District General Election, 2020
Party	Candidate	Votes	%
Democratic	Gilda Cobb-Hunter (incumbent)	11,795	69.97
Republican	Jeffrey Cila	5,057	30.00
Write-in		6	0.04
Total votes		16,858	100.0
Democratic hold			

=== District 67 ===
67th District General Election, 2020
Party	Candidate	Votes	%
Republican	Murrell Smith (incumbent)	13,834	97.26
Write-in		390	2.74
Total votes		14,224	100.0
Republican hold			

=== District 68 ===
68th District General Election, 2020
Party	Candidate	Votes	%
Republican	Heather Ammons Crawford (incumbent)	17,014	60.88
Alliance	Mike Childs	3,007	14.91
Write-in		147	0.73
Total votes		20,168	100.0
Republican hold			

=== District 69 ===
69th District General Election, 2020
Party	Candidate	Votes	%
Republican	Chris Wooten (incumbent)	18,269	97.25
Write-in		517	2.75
Total votes		18,786	100.0
Republican hold			

=== District 70 ===
70th District General Election, 2020
Party	Candidate	Votes	%
Democratic	Wendy C Brawley (incumbent)	14,028	98.19
Write-in		258	1.81
Total votes		14,286	100.0
Democratic hold			

=== District 71 ===
71st District General Election, 2020
Party	Candidate	Votes	%
Republican	Nathan Ballentine (incumbent)	16,993	64.60
Democratic	Terry T Seawright	8,524	32.41
Libertarian	Lawrence L Lee	763	2.90
Write-in		24	0.09
Total votes		26,304	100.0
Republican hold			

=== District 72 ===
72nd District General Election, 2020
Party	Candidate	Votes	%
Democratic	Seth Rose (incumbent)	9,930	98.17
Write-in		185	1.83
Total votes		10,115	100.0
Democratic hold			

=== District 73 ===
73rd District General Election, 2020
Party	Candidate	Votes	%
Democratic	Chris Hart (incumbent)	11,421	78.14
Republican	Myron Samuels	3,178	21.74
Write-in		17	0.12
Total votes		14,616	100.0
Democratic hold			

=== District 74 ===
74th District General Election, 2020
Party	Candidate	Votes	%
Democratic	Todd Rutherford (incumbent)	12,328	82.81
Republican	Vimalkumar Jariwala	2,526	16.97
Write-in		33	0.22
Total votes		14,887	100.0
Democratic hold			

=== District 75 ===
75th District General Election, 2020
Party	Candidate	Votes	%
Republican	Kirkman Finlay III (incumbent)	8,759	50.69
Democratic	Rhodes Bailey	8,502	49.20
Write-in		20	0.12
Total votes		17,281	100.0
Republican hold			

=== District 76 ===
76th District General Election, 2020
Party	Candidate	Votes	%
Democratic	Leon Howard (incumbent)	14,746	98.85
Write-in		171	1.15
Total votes		14,917	100.0
Democratic hold			

=== District 77 ===
77th District General Election, 2020
Party	Candidate	Votes	%
Democratic	Kambrell Garvin (incumbent)	19,947	83.57
Libertarian	Justin Bishop	3,793	15.89
Write-in		128	0.54
Total votes		23,868	100.0
Democratic hold			

=== District 78 ===
78th District General Election, 2020
Party	Candidate	Votes	%
Democratic	Beth Bernstein (incumbent)	12,449	65.89
Republican	Viresh Sinha	6,422	33.99
Write-in		22	0.12
Total votes		18,893	100.0
Democratic hold			

=== District 79 ===
79th District General Election, 2020
Party	Candidate	Votes	%
Democratic	Ivory T Thigpen (incumbent)	18,032	86.95
Libertarian	Victor Kocher	2,615	12.61
Write-in		91	0.44
Total votes		20,738	100.0
Democratic hold			

=== District 80 ===
80th District General Election, 2020
Party	Candidate	Votes	%
Democratic	Jermaine Johnson	11,540	60.47
Republican	Vincent E Wilson	7,531	39.46
Write-in		12	0.06
Total votes		19,083	100.0
Democratic hold			

=== District 81 ===
81st District General Election, 2020
Party	Candidate	Votes	%
Republican	Bart T Blackwell (incumbent)	8,759	50.69
Write-in		580	2.93
Total votes		19,762	100.0
Republican hold			

=== District 82 ===
82nd District General Election, 2020
Party	Candidate	Votes	%
Democratic	William Bill Clyburn (incumbent)	11,210	93.96
Write-in		720	6.04
Total votes		11,930	100.0
Democratic hold			

=== District 83 ===
83rd District General Election, 2020
Party	Candidate	Votes	%
Republican	Bill Hixon (incumbent)	14,730	70.09
Democratic	Evelyn T Robinson	6,258	29.78
Write-in		29	0.14
Total votes		21,017	100.0
Republican hold			

=== District 84 ===
84th District General Election, 2020
Party	Candidate	Votes	%
Republican	Melissa Oremus (incumbent)	14,056	97.14
Write-in		414	2.86
Total votes		14,470	100.0
Republican hold			

=== District 85 ===
85th District General Election, 2020
Party	Candidate	Votes	%
Republican	Chip Huggins (incumbent)	20,169	97.11
Write-in		600	2.89
Total votes		20,769	100.0
Republican hold			

=== District 86 ===
86th District General Election, 2020
Party	Candidate	Votes	%
Republican	Bill Taylor (incumbent)	14,898	96.94
Write-in		470	3.06
Total votes		15,368	100.0
Republican hold			

=== District 87 ===
87th District General Election, 2020
Party	Candidate	Votes	%
Republican	Paula Rawl Calhoon (incumbent)	23,721	97.98
Write-in		489	2.02
Total votes		24,210	100.0
Republican hold			

=== District 88 ===
88th District General Election, 2020
Party	Candidate	Votes	%
Republican	RJ May	14,962	97.07
Write-in		452	2.93
Total votes		15,414	100.0
Republican hold			

=== District 89 ===
89th District General Election, 2020
Party	Candidate	Votes	%
Republican	Micah Caskey (incumbent)	12,661	96.04
Write-in		522	3.96
Total votes		13,183	100.0
Republican hold			

=== District 90 ===
90th District General Election, 2020
Party	Candidate	Votes	%
Democratic	Justin Bamberg (incumbent)	8,234	50.15
Republican	Glenn Posey	8,174	49.78
Write-in		11	0.07
Total votes		16,419	100.0
Democratic hold			

=== District 91 ===
91st District General Election, 2020
Party	Candidate	Votes	%
Democratic	Loonie Hosey (incumbent)	12,025	97.92
Write-in		256	2.08
Total votes		12,281	100
Democratic hold			

=== District 92 ===
92nd District General Election, 2020
Party	Candidate	Votes	%
Republican	Joe Daning (incumbent)	13,816	96.74
Write-in		465	3.26
Total votes		14,281	100.0
Republican hold			

=== District 93 ===
93rd District General Election, 2020
Party	Candidate	Votes	%
Democratic	Russell L Ott (incumbent)	13,820	96.66
Write-in		477	3.34
Total votes		14,297	100.0
Democratic hold			

=== District 94 ===
94th District General Election, 2020
Party	Candidate	Votes	%
Republican	Gil Gatch	12,011	61.04
Democratic	Patricia Cannon	7,652	38.89
Write-in		13	0.07
Total votes		19,676	100.0
Republican hold			

=== District 95 ===
95th District General Election, 2020
Party	Candidate	Votes	%
Democratic	Jerry Govan (incumbent)	11,847	86.64
Labor	Willie M Legette	1,650	12.07
Write-in		177	1.29
Total votes		13,674	100.0
Democratic hold			

=== District 96 ===
96th District General Election, 2020
Party	Candidate	Votes	%
Republican	D Ryan McCabe	13,397	97.76
Write-in		307	2.24
Total votes		13,704	100.0
Republican hold			

=== District 97 ===
97th District General Election, 2020
Party	Candidate	Votes	%
Republican	Mandy W Kimmons (incumbent)	14,153	62.25
Democratic	Ronee De Canio	8,559	37.65
Write-in		22	0.10
Total votes		22,734	100.0
Republican hold			

=== District 98 ===
98th District General Election, 2020
Party	Candidate	Votes	%
Republican	Chris Murphy (incumbent)	14,951	95.14
Write-in		763	0.07
Total votes		15,714	100.0
Republican hold			

=== District 99 ===
99th District General Election, 2020
Party	Candidate	Votes	%
Republican	Mark Smith	17,711	64.28
Democratic	Jen Gibson	9,816	35.63
Write-in		26	0.09
Total votes		27,553	100.0
Republican hold			

=== District 100 ===
100th District General Election, 2020
Party	Candidate	Votes	%
Republican	Sylleste Davis	22,345	96.31
Write-in		857	3.69
Total votes		23,202	100.0
Republican hold			

=== District 101 ===
101st District General Election, 2020
Party	Candidate	Votes	%
Democratic	Cezar McKnight (incumbent)	12,758	96.34
Write-in		485	3.66
Total votes		13,243	100.0
Democratic hold			

=== District 102 ===
102nd District General Election, 2020
Party	Candidate	Votes	%
Democratic	Joe H Jefferson	12,500	94.96
Write-in		663	5.04
Total votes		13,163	100.0
Democratic hold			

=== District 103 ===
103rd District General Election, 2020
Party	Candidate	Votes	%
Democratic	Carl L Anderson (incumbent)	12,606	96.75
Write-in		424	3.25
Total votes		13,030	100.0
Democratic hold			

=== District 104 ===
104th District General Election, 2020
Party	Candidate	Votes	%
Republican	William Bailey (incumbent)	24,360	98.56
Write-in		357	1.44
Total votes		24,717	100.0
Republican hold			

=== District 105 ===
105th District General Election, 2020
Party	Candidate	Votes	%
Republican	Kevin Hardee (incumbent)	14,870	97.94
Write-in		312	2.06
Total votes		15,182	100.0
Republican hold			

=== District 106 ===
106th District General Election, 2020
Party	Candidate	Votes	%
Republican	Russell Fry (incumbent)	24,092	98.46
Write-in		376	1.54
Total votes		24,468	100.0
Republican hold			

=== District 107 ===
107th District General Election, 2020
Party	Candidate	Votes	%
Republican	Case Brittain	15,956	65.46
Democratic	Tony Cahill	7,963	32.67
Libertarian	Wm Dettmering III	427	1.75
Write-in		28	0.11
Total votes		24,374	100.0
Republican hold			

=== District 108 ===
108th District General Election, 2020
Party	Candidate	Votes	%
Republican	Lee Hewitt (incumbent)	21,800	97.87
Write-in		475	2.13
Total votes		22,275	100.0
Republican hold			

=== District 109 ===
109th District General Election, 2020
Party	Candidate	Votes	%
Democratic	Deon Tedder	11,279	80.59
Libertarian	Rodney Travis	2,620	18.72
Write-in		97	0.69
Total votes		13,996	100.0
Democratic hold			

=== District 110 ===
110th District General Election, 2020
Party	Candidate	Votes	%
Republican	William Cogswell (incumbent)	13,280	60.67
Democratic	Rebecca Niess Cingolani	8,590	39.25
Write-in		18	0.08
Total votes		21,888	100.0
Republican hold			

=== District 111 ===
111th District General Election, 2020
Party	Candidate	Votes	%
Democratic	Wendell G Gilliard (incumbent)	13,088	79.11
Republican	Ted Vining	3,431	20.74
Write-in		26	0.16
Total votes		16,545	100.0
Democratic hold			

=== District 112 ===
112th District General Election, 2020
Party	Candidate	Votes	%
Republican	Joe Bustos	18,002	57.46
Democratic	Daniel Brownstein	13,284	42.40
Write-in		41	0.13
Total votes		31,327	100.0
Republican hold			

=== District 113 ===
113th District General Election, 2020
Party	Candidate	Votes	%
Democratic	Marvin R Pendarvis (incumbent)	13,054	97.75
Write-in		301	2.25
Total votes		13,355	100.0
Democratic hold			

=== District 114 ===
114th District General Election, 2020
Party	Candidate	Votes	%
Republican	Lin Bennett (incumbent)	13,039	52.96
Democratic	Ed Sutton	10,855	44.09
Alliance	Brad Jayne	705	2.86
Write-in		21	0.09
Total votes		24,620	100.0
Republican hold			

=== District 115 ===
115th District General Election, 2020
Party	Candidate	Votes	%
Democratic	Spencer Wetmore	13,382	50.75
Republican	Josh Stokes	12,962	49.16
Write-in		23	0.90
Total votes		26,367	100.0
Democratic gain from Republican			

=== District 116 ===
116th District General Election, 2020
Party	Candidate	Votes	%
Democratic	Chardale Murray	12,227	50.78
Republican	Carroll O'Neal	11,809	49.04
Write-in		42	0.17
Total votes		24,078	100.0
Democratic hold			

=== District 117 ===
117th District General Election, 2020
Party	Candidate	Votes	%
Democratic	Krystle Matthews (incumbent)	8,902	52.62
Republican	Jordan Pace	7,998	47.28
Write-in		16	0.09
Total votes		16,916	100.0
Democratic hold			

=== District 118 ===
118th District General Election, 2020
Party	Candidate	Votes	%
Republican	Bill Herbkersman (incumbent)	16,947	61.72
Democratic	Mitchell Siegel	10,493	38.22
Write-in		16	0.06
Total votes		27,456	100.0
Republican hold			

=== District 119 ===
119th District General Election, 2020
Party	Candidate	Votes	%
Democratic	Leon Stavrinakis (incumbent)	16,842	69.53
Libertarian	Alex Thornton	7,225	29.83
Write-in		156	0.64
Total votes		24,223	100.0
Democratic hold			

=== District 120 ===
120th District General Election, 2020
Party	Candidate	Votes	%
Republican	Weston Newton (incumbent)	18,313	97.61
Write-in		448	2.39
Total votes		18,761	100.0
Republican hold			

=== District 121 ===
121st District General Election, 2020
Party	Candidate	Votes	%
Democratic	Michael F Rivers Sr (incumbent)	10,986	63.29
Republican	Eric Erickson	6,358	36.63
Write-in		13	0.07
Total votes		17,357	100.0
Democratic hold			

=== District 122 ===
122nd District General Election, 2020
Party	Candidate	Votes	%
Democratic	Sherdon Hook Williams (incumbent)	9,147	56.97
Republican	Ashley Lawton	6,905	43.00
Write-in		5	0.03
Total votes		16,057	100.0
Democratic hold			

=== District 123 ===
123rd District General Election, 2020
Party	Candidate	Votes	%
Republican	Jeff Bradley (incumbent)	14,604	62.47
Democratic	Christine deVries	8,751	37.43
Write-in		24	0.10
Total votes		23,379	100.0
Republican hold			

=== District 124 ===
124th District General Election, 2020
Party	Candidate	Votes	%
Republican	Shannon Erickson (incumbent)	11,949	63.22
Democratic	Barb Nash	6,924	36.63
Write-in		28	0.15
Total votes		18,901	100.0
Republican hold			

== See also ==
- 2020 South Carolina elections
