= Marvin R. Pendarvis =

Former American politician (born 1989)

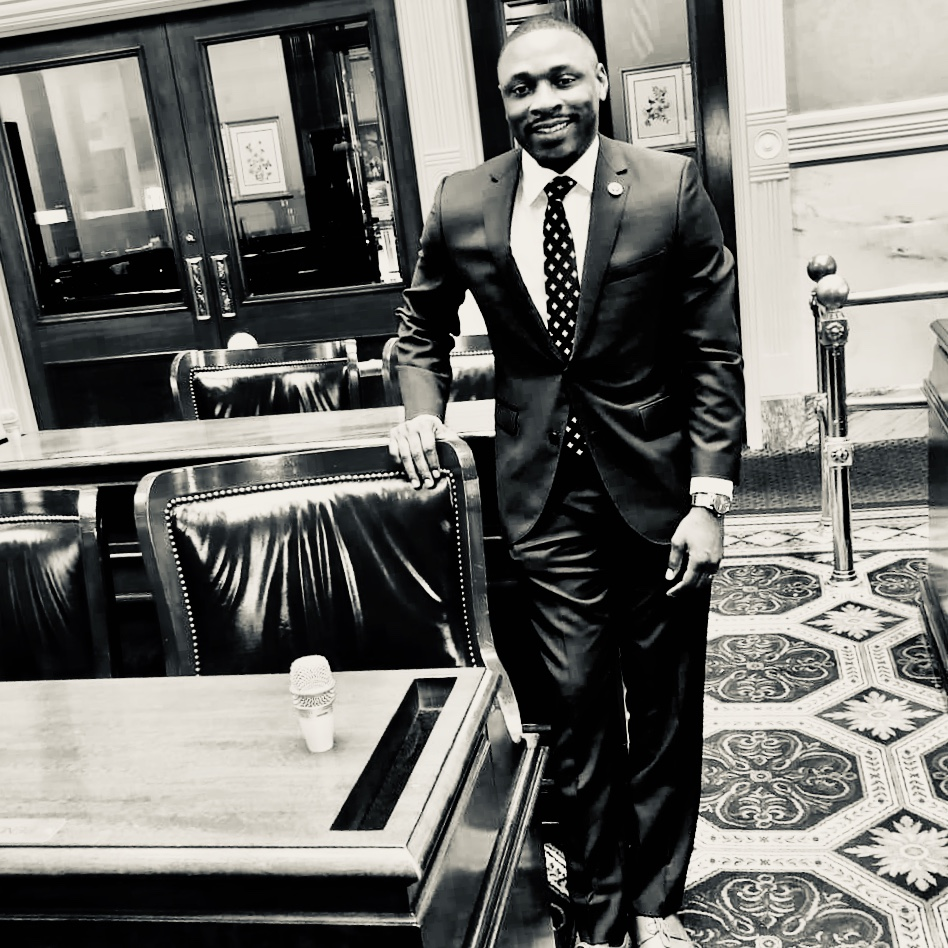

Member of the South Carolina House of Representatives from the 113th district
- In office November 7, 2017 – September 16, 2024
- Preceded by: Seth Whipper
- Succeeded by: Courtney Waters

Personal details
- Born: October 13, 1989 (age 37) Charleston, South Carolina, U.S.
- Party: Democratic
- Children: 1 (Marvin R. Pendarvis Jr.)
- Parent(s): Geneice Pendarvis, Marvin Mitchell
- Education: University of South Carolina (B.A., 2011; J.D., 2014)

Marvin Rashad Pendarvis (born October 13, 1989) is an American former politician and attorney who represented the 113th District (parts of Charleston County) in the South Carolina House of Representatives from 2017 until his resignation in 2024. He is a member of the Democratic Party.

== Education, career and public service ==
Pendarvis attended Garrett Academy for Technology, a high school in North Charleston, where he was a wide receiver on the football team. He graduated in 2011 from the University of South Carolina with an undergraduate degree in political science, and in 2014 with a J.D. from the University's School of Law. He was a member of the Omega Psi Phi fraternity. Pendarvis served on the North Charleston Board of Zoning Appeals from 2016-2017.

Pendarvis worked as an attorney in North Charleston for the Peper Law Firm, the Pendarvis Law Firm, LLC, and as the attorney for the Dorchester County town of Ridgeville, South Carolina, and as a member of the legal team for the Charleston-based Racial Justice Network. He also had a backlog contract with the Ninth Circuit Public Defender's Office, which ended in 2022.

== South Carolina House of Representatives ==
2017

When long-time Democratic state legislator Jackson Seth Whipper resigned in August 2017 to become a magistrate judge in Charleston County, Pendarvis became a candidate for his seat in District 113. He ran against Angela M. Hanyak and Chris Collins in the Democratic primary. Pendarvis won with 79.9% of the vote. In the general election, he defeated Republican Theron Sandy II of Pinehurst to win by 1,118 votes.

2018

Pendarvis was unopposed in the Democratic primary and general election.

2020

Pendarvis won his primary on June 9, 2020, and was unopposed in the general election on November 3. In June 2020, he hired his only major staffer, communications director Jackson Hamilton. Pendarvis introduced legislation to reduce the high rate of evictions in South Carolina, working with advocacy groups on the issue.

2023

After the announcement that North Charleston Mayor Keith Sumney would not run for re-election, Pendarvis declined to run for the seat, expressing his decision to remain in the House of Representatives.

In March 2023, Pendarvis introduced a bill to create an independent redistricting commission to combat gerrymandering. He served on the House Medical, Military, Public and Municipal Affairs and the Legislative Oversight committees.

2024

Pendarvis filed unopposed for re-election.

On September 16, 2024, in a letter to House Speaker Murrell Smith, Pendarvis resigned his seat, effective immediately. Because information did not come in time to remove his name from the general election ballot, a special election was scheduled for March 25, 2025.

Charleston County School Board Trustee Courtney Waters announced her intention to run for the seat on November 7. In a Special Election Democratic Primary on January 21, 2025, Waters defeated Michelle Brandt and Kim Clark. Since no other opponents filed, Waters was the presumptive member-elect for the seat. She went on to win the March 25, 2025 Special Election.

=== Election history ===
District 113 - Charleston and Dorchester Counties
Year	Candidate	Votes	Pct	Candidate	Votes	Pct	Candidate	Votes	Pct
2017 Special Election Primary	Marvin R. Pendarvis	804	79.9%	Angela M. Hanyak	120	11.9%	Chris Collins	82	8.2%
2017 Special Election	Marvin R. Pendarvis	1,463	80.9%	Theron Sandy II	343	19%			
2018 Primary	Marvin R. Pendarvis								
2018 General	Marvin R. Pendarvis	8,256	98.5%						

== Legal issues ==
=== Investigation ===
On May 17, 2024, Chief Justice Donald W. Beatty of the South Carolina Supreme Court released a decision to temporarily suspend Pendarvis' license to practice law, in connection with a lawsuit filed against him alleging legal malpractice and forgery. After the lawsuit was filed April 11, 2024, First Circuit Solicitor David Pascoe requested an investigation by the South Carolina Law Enforcement Division (SLED). SLED confirmed the following day that it had begun an investigation into the matter.

=== Indictment and arraignment ===
On November 5, 2025, in the US District Court for the District of South Carolina Charleston Division, Pendarvis was charged with four counts of wire fraud, three counts of aggravated identity theft, two counts of money laundering, and one count of engaging in illegal monetary transactions.

Pendarvis was arraigned on November 18, 2025 in Charleston, South Carolina. He was released on $50,000 bond and faces up to 20 years in prison each for the wire fraud and money laundering charges. Each count of aggravated identity theft carries a mandatory two-year prison term. Pendarvis entered a not guilty plea and was determined to need a public defender.
