= Adam Lewis Duncan =

American politician

Adam Duncan

Member of the South Carolina House of Representatives from the 2nd district
- Incumbent
- Assumed office November 11, 2024
- Preceded by: Bill Sandifer III

Personal details
- Party: Republican
- Profession: Coach

Adam Duncan is an American politician. He is a member of the South Carolina House of Representatives from the 2nd District, serving since 2024. He is a member of the Republican party.

== Early life and career ==
Duncan is an assistant wrestling coach at West-Oak High School and head boys' golf coach.

== Political career ==
=== 2024 South Carolina House race ===
See also: 2024 South Carolina elections, 2024 state legislature elections in the United States, South Carolina House of Representatives elections, 2024 South Carolina House of Representatives election

In March 2024, Republican incumbent Bill Sandifer III filed for re-election. In the SC Republican June primary, he was defeated by Duncan.

Duncan pledged to support Congressional term limits.

Duncan serves on the House Education and Public Works and the Interstate Cooperation committees.

== Personal life ==
In 2026 Duncan was arrested on suspicion of driving under the influence of alcohol.
