= Rex L. Carter =

American lawyer and politician

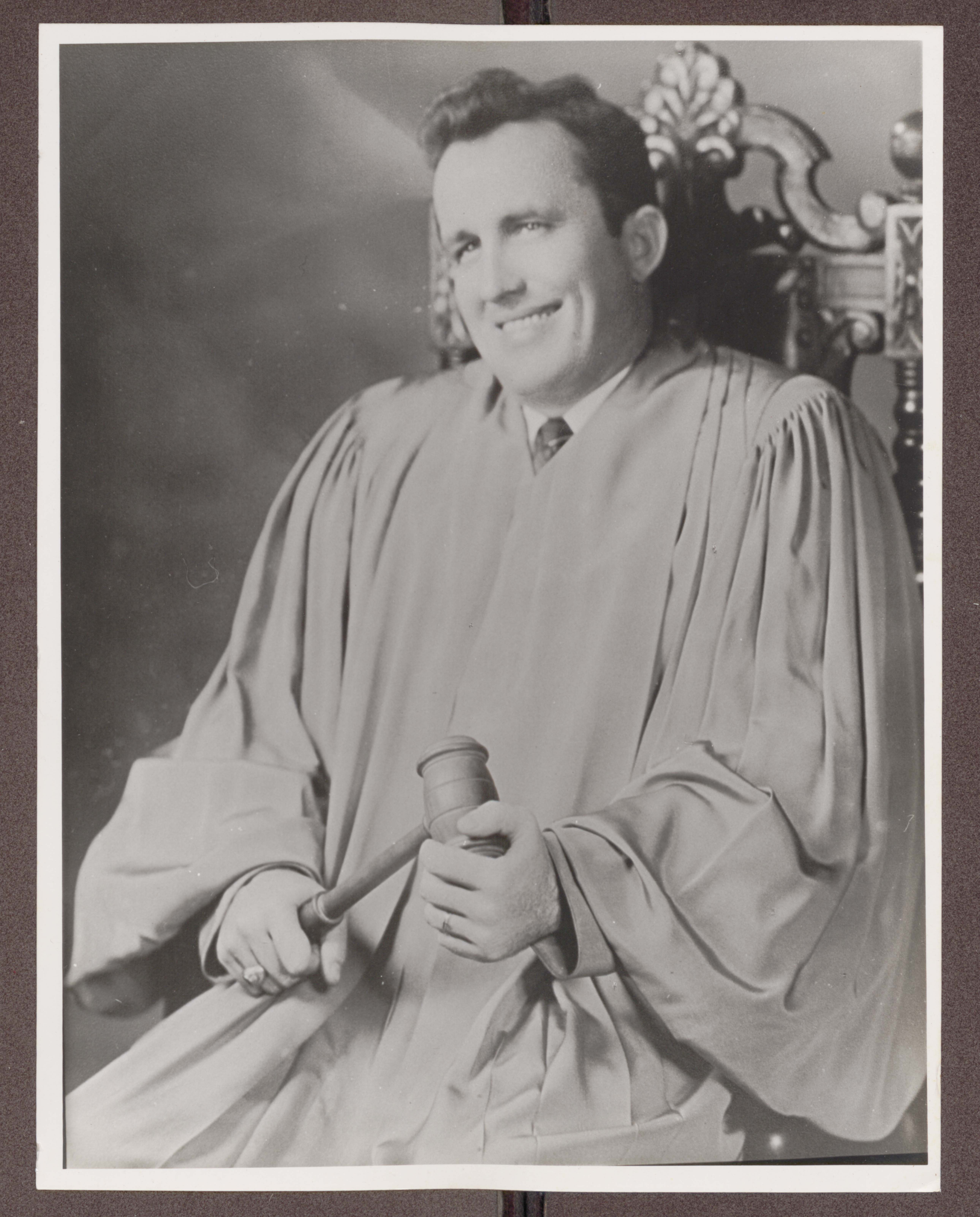

55th Speaker of the South Carolina House of Representatives
- In office August 1, 1973 – December 1980
- Preceded by: Solomon Blatt
- Succeeded by: Ramon Schwartz, Jr.

Member of the South Carolina House of Representatives from the 24th district
- In office December 1974 – December 1980
- Preceded by: None (district created)
- Succeeded by: David Wilkins

Member of the South Carolina House of Representatives from Greenville County
- In office December 1952 – December 1974
- Preceded by: Clarence E. Clay, Jr.
- Succeeded by: None (districts numbered)

Personal details
- Born: Rex Lyle Carter; June 20, 1925 Honea Path, South Carolina, U.S.
- Died: June 9, 2014 (aged 88) Greenville, South Carolina, U.S.
- Party: Democratic
- Spouse: Floride Gulledge
- Children: 4
- Education: Erskine College; University of South Carolina

Military service
- Allegiance: United States of America
- Branch/service: United States Coast Guard
- Years of service: 1943 - 1946
- Battles/wars: World War II

Rex Lyle Carter (June 20, 1925 – June 9, 2014) was an American lawyer and politician.

Born in Honea Path, South Carolina, Anderson County, South Carolina, Carter served in the United States Coast Guard during World War II. He then received his bachelor's degree from Erskine College and then his law degree from University of South Carolina School of Law. Carter then practiced law in Greenville, South Carolina. He served in the South Carolina House of Representatives, as a Democrat, from 1953 until 1980 and was speaker. He died in Greenville, South Carolina.
