= Courtney Waters =

American politician

Member of the South Carolina House of Representatives from the 113th district
- Incumbent
- Assumed office April 1, 2025
- Preceded by: Marvin R. Pendarvis

Personal details
- Born: Flint, Michigan
- Party: Democrat
- Children: 1
- Education: Rhodes College
- Profession: Nonprofit organization director

Courtney Waters is an American politician representing South Carolina House of Representatives District 113. She is a member of the Democratic party.

== Career and public service ==
Waters is currently the director of a nonprofit organization. Prior to that, she was a teacher.

== Political career ==
=== SC House of Representatives ===
Democratic incumbent Marvin R. Pendarvis resigned from the South Carolina House District 113 seat on September 16, 2024. Because information did not come in time to remove his name from the general election ballot, a special election was scheduled for March 25, 2025.

Waters announced her intention to run for the seat on November 7. In a Special Election Democratic Primary on January 21, 2025, Waters defeated Michelle Brandt and Kim Clark.

Since no other opponents filed, Waters was the presumptive member-elect for the House seat. She went on to win the March 25, 2025 Special Election.

Waters serves on the House Medical, Military, Public and Municipal Affairs Committee.

=== School Board ===
Waters served for four years as a Charleston County School Board Trustee.

=== Election History ===
District 113 - Charleston County 2025 Democratic Primary Special Election results
Year	Candidate	Votes	Pct	Candidate	Votes	Pct	Candidate	Votes	Pct
2025 Special Election Primary	Courtney Waters	561	69.86	Michelle Brandt	228	28.39	Kim Clark	14	1.74
2025 Special Election	Courtney Waters	388	97.98%	Write-In	8	2.02%			
