= James Simons Sr. =

American militia officer and politician (1813–1879)

James Simons
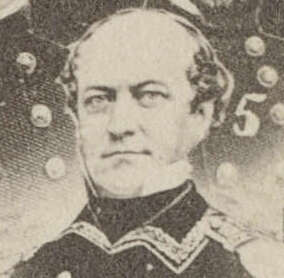
- Portrait of Simons

Member of the South Carolina House of Representatives from the Charleston district
- In office 1842–1862

Personal details
- Born: May 9, 1813 Charleston, South Carolina, U.S.
- Died: April 26, 1879 (aged 65) Charleston, South Carolina, U.S.
- Resting place: Charleston, South Carolina, U.S.
- Party: Democratic
- Spouse: Sarah L. Wragg
- Children: 2, including James Jr.
- Education: South Carolina College (BA)
- Occupation: Lawyer; militia officer; politician

James Simons Sr. (May 9, 1813 – April 26, 1879) was a lawyer, Confederate militia officer, and state legislator in South Carolina. He served as Speaker of the South Carolina House of Representatives when the Civil War began.

== Early life ==
James Simons was born on May 9, 1813, in Charleston, South Carolina, to James Simons. His father was collector of the port of Charleston and served as captain in the Continental Army with William Washington and as the aide-de-camp of Casimir Pulaski. He graduated from South Carolina College in 1833 with a Bachelor of Arts and was admitted to the bar in 1835.

== Career ==
In 1842, Simons was elected to represent Charleston in the South Carolina House of Representatives. In 1850, he was elected as Speaker of the South Carolina House of Representatives and served 12 successive terms. In 1857, he served on the committee with Wilmot G. de Saussure, S. McGowan, A. C. Spain, and R. B. Boylston that prepared the rules of the house and senate. In October 1862, he retired from the legislature.

Simons was a member of the South Carolina militia for almost 30 years. During the Civil War, he commanded the fourth brigade of the South Carolina militia. During the Battle of Fort Sumter, he commanded forces on Morris Island. He resigned as brigadier general of the militia in July 1861. He was succeeded as brigadier general by fellow legislator Wilmot G. de Saussure. Simons wrote a "a list of articles desired" to John B. Lafitte in Nassau for purchase from the proceeds of the sale of cotton smuggled through the blockade.

Simons practiced law with his son James Jr. in the Charleston firm Simons & Simons after the war. He was president of South Carolina's Society of the Cincinnati. He served as vice president under president Hamilton Fish of the national organization. He served as commissioner of free schools for the city of Charleston from 1847 to 1858.

== Personal life ==
Simons married Sarah L. Wragg. They had six children, James Jr., Manning, H. Read, Bonde Pon, Rheta, and Mrs. J. D. Ferguson. His son James was also a lawyer and state legislator.

Simons died on April 26, 1879, at his home in Charleston. He was buried in Charleston.
