= Harry R. Askins =

American politician

Member of the South Carolina House of Representatives from the 61st district 1993-2002
- Preceded by: E. LeRoy Nettles, Jr.
- Succeeded by: Lester P. Branham Jr.

Personal details
- Born: November 21, 1946 (age 79) Florence, South Carolina, United States
- Children: 2
- Education: Clemson University
- Profession: Retired Minister

Harry R. Askins (November 21, 1946) is an American politician.

== Political career ==
Askins was the member of the South Carolina House of Representatives from the 61st District, serving in the House from 1993. He retired in 2002.

== Family ==
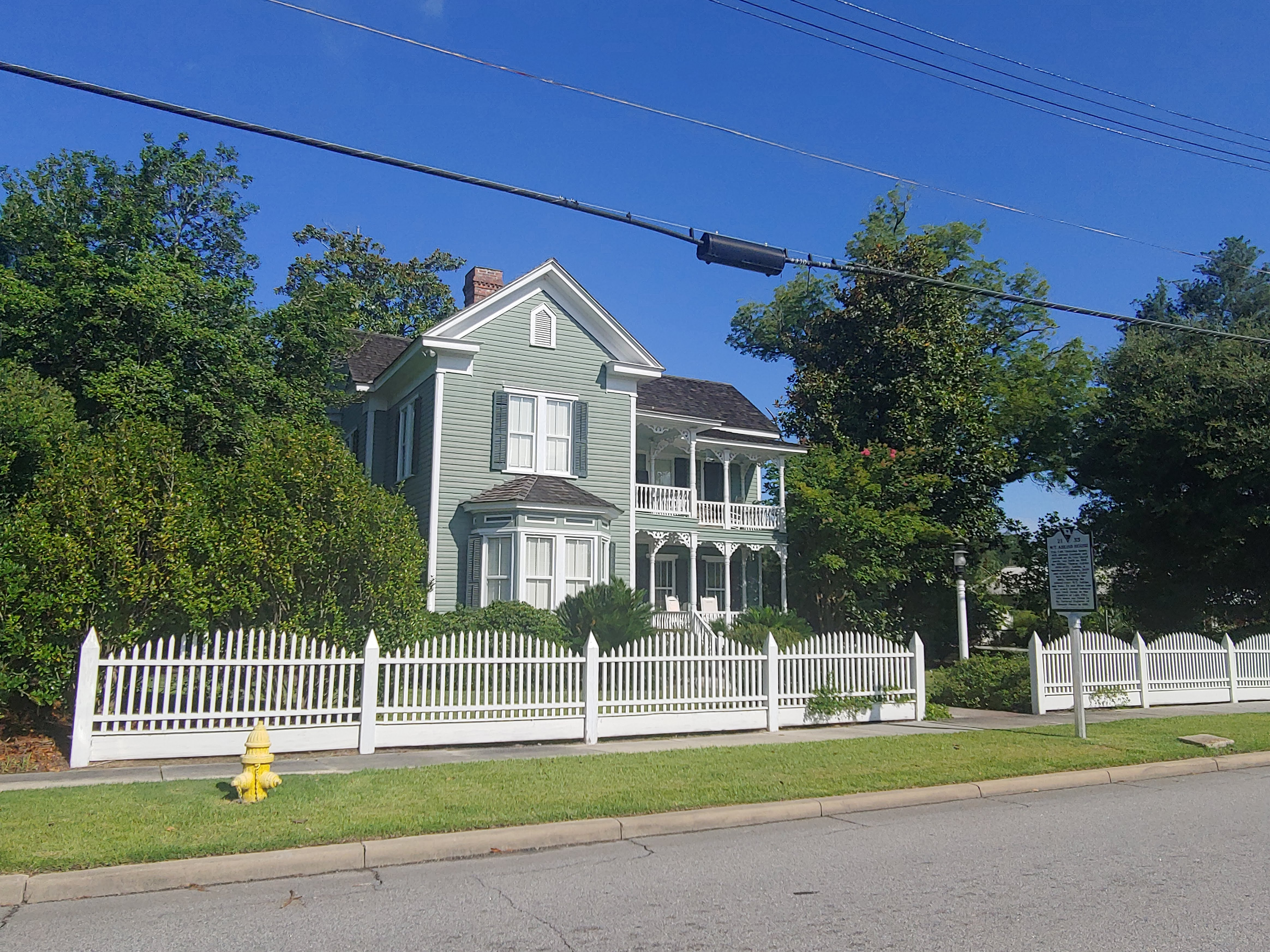
W. T. Askins House

Askins is the grandson of William Thomas Askins, a prominent Florence County, South Carolina merchant and farmer. The W.T. Askins House has been preserved and is listed on the National Register of Historic Places.
