= John Michael Baxley =

American politician and attorney

Member of the South Carolina House of Representatives from the 65th district
- In office 1986–1998
- Preceded by: Warren DuPree Arthur IV
- Succeeded by: Jay Lucas

Personal details
- Born: August 24, 1956 (age 69)
- Party: Republican
- Education: University of South Carolina, (JD)

John Michael Baxley (born August 24, 1956) is an American politician and attorney. He served as a member of the South Carolina House of Representatives from the 65th District from 1986 to 1998. Baxley is a Republican.

== Early life, education and career ==
Baxley graduated from Hartsville High School in 1974, Clemson University in 1978 and the University of South Carolina in 1982.

== Political career ==
From 1986 to 1998, Baxley served in the South Carolina House of Representatives.

== Legal career ==
From February 8, 2000, until his retirement in April 2014, Baxley served in a judicial seat of the Fourth Circuit, elected by the General Assembly.

From 2014 to 2020, Baxley worked as general counsel for Santee Cooper, called upon to make public comments about VC Summer and Westinghouse. In 2020, Baxley became counsel to the Douglas Jennings Law Firm of Bennettsville, South Carolina.
