= W. T. Askins House =

Historic house in South Carolina, United States

- U.S. National Register of Historic Places
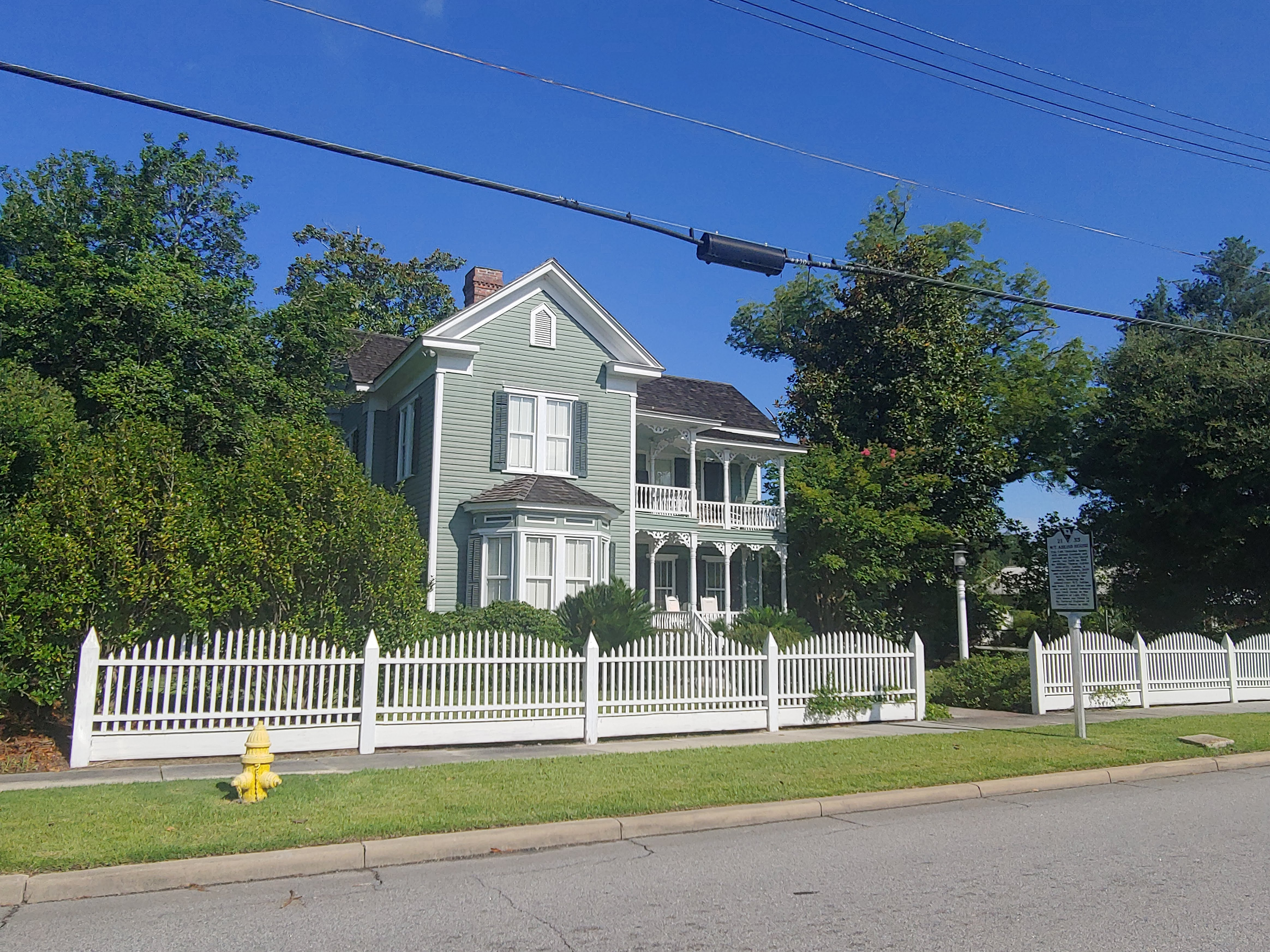
- W.T. Askins House in Lake City, SC

- Location within South Carolina Location within the United States
- Location: 178 S. Acline Ave., Lake City, South Carolina
- Coordinates: 33°52′11″N 79°45′22″W
- Area: 2 acres (0.81 ha)
- Built: c. 1895
- Architectural style: Late Victorian
- NRHP reference No.: 95000636
- Added to NRHP: May 26, 1995

W. T. Askins House is a historic home located at Lake City, Florence County, South Carolina. It was built about 1895, and is a two-story, L-shaped, frame Folk Victorian style dwelling. It is clad with shiplap siding and set upon a brick pier foundation. Also on the property are a gable-front garage and a smoke house. It was the home of William Thomas Askins (1859–1932), a prominent merchant and farmer of Lake City and lower Florence County.

It was listed on the National Register of Historic Places in 1995.

W. T. Askins is the grandfather of former South Carolina State legislator Harry R. Askins.
