= Ramon Schwartz Jr. =

American politician

56th Speaker of the South Carolina House of Representatives
- In office December 1980 – October 1, 1986
- Preceded by: Rex L. Carter
- Succeeded by: Robert Sheheen

Member of the South Carolina House of Representatives from the 68th district
- In office December 1974 – October 1, 1986
- Preceded by: None (district created)
- Succeeded by: Joe McElveen

Member of the South Carolina House of Representatives from Sumter County
- In office December 1968 – December 1974
- Preceded by: Henry C. Edens
- Succeeded by: None (districts numbered)

Personal details
- Born: May 25, 1925 Sumter, South Carolina, U.S.
- Died: June 30, 2017 (aged 92) Sumter, South Carolina, U.S.
- Party: Democratic
- Spouse: Rosa Weinberg
- Education: University of South Carolina

Ramon Schwartz Jr. (May 25, 1925 – June 30, 2017) was an American politician in the state of South Carolina. He served in the South Carolina House of Representatives from 1969 to 1987 as a Democrat. Schwartz was an attorney and lived in Sumter, South Carolina. He served as speaker pro tempore prior to his election to the position of Speaker of the House in 1980, in which he served until his retirement in 1986. He was an alumnus of the University of South Carolina, where he was a member of the Euphradian Society and also the institution's first-ever student body vice president. Additionally, Schwartz is a veteran of World War II. He died in Sumter in 2017 at the age of 92.
