= James Simons Jr. =

American politician (1839–1919)

Member of the South Carolina House of Representatives from the Charleston County district
- In office 1878–1891

Personal details
- Born: November 30, 1839 Charleston, South Carolina, U.S.
- Died: July 4, 1919 (aged 79) Charleston, South Carolina, U.S.
- Resting place: Magnolia Cemetery
- Spouse: Elizabeth Potter Schott (m. 1890)
- Parent: James Simons Sr. (father)
- Education: University of South Carolina; University of Leipzig
- Occupation: Lawyer; politician; newspaper publisher

James Simons Jr. (November 30, 1839 – July 4, 1919) was an American lawyer, politician, and newspaper president from South Carolina. He served as Speaker of the South Carolina House of Representatives from 1882 to 1890 and as a member of the South Carolina House of Representatives from 1878 to 1891.

== Early life ==
James Simons Jr. was born on November 30, 1839, in Charleston, South Carolina, to Sarah (née Wragg) and James Simons Sr. His ancestors were Huguenots. He attended private schools in Charleston. He graduated from the University of South Carolina and attended the University of Leipzig.

== Career ==
On August 22, 1861, Simons enlisted in the Confederate States Army as a first lieutenant of company A, Artillery Battalion, Hampton League (Bachman's battery). He served in the battles of Manassas, Sharpsburg, Suffolk, Fredericksburg, and Gettysburg. By the end of the war, he was in command of a battery of light artillery. He was an officer of the German Artillery, South Carolina Volunteers, a state militia company.

Following the war, Simons practiced law. He practiced law with his father in the law firm Simons & Simons in the 1860s. He also practiced law with Rudolph Septimus Siegling. He practiced law for 20 years with John D. Cappelmann. He served in the South Carolina House of Representatives, representing Charleston County, from 1878 to 1891. He was Speaker of the South Carolina House of Representatives from 1882 to 1890.

Simons succeeded Rudolph Siegling as president of The News and Courier in 1894 and remained in the position for 25 years. He was chairman of the board of school commissioners. During his tenure, the school district reduced its debt, refurbished its schools, and built the Mitchell School. He was involved in the construction of a vocational school for black children. He also served as president of the trustees of the Charleston High School. He was president of the Carolina Art Association. He was vice president of the Society of the Cincinnati in 1892 and served as president of the South Carolina Society of the Cincinnati in 1898. He served as vice president alongside Wylie Jones of the Anti–Imperialist League, a group opposed to the U.S. annexation of the Philippines.

== Personal life ==
Simons married Elizabeth Potter Schott on October 16, 1890. He had an interest in literature and played the violin. He was active in Charleston's German community.

Simons died of neuritis on July 4, 1919, at his home on Board Street in Charleston. He was buried in Magnolia Cemetery.

== Awards and legacy ==
Simons received an honorary Doctor of Laws degree in 1905. His portrait is displayed at the James Simons School on Moultrie Street at King Street in Charleston. The South Carolina Historical Society has a collection of his papers.
