= Bill Sandifer III =

American politician (born 1945)

Member of the South Carolina House of Representatives from the 2nd district
- In office January 1995 – December 2024
- Preceded by: Lindsey Graham
- Succeeded by: Adam Lewis Duncan

Personal details
- Born: February 21, 1945 (age 81) Aiken, South Carolina, U.S.
- Party: Republican

William Sandifer III (born February 21, 1945) is an American politician. He was a member of the South Carolina House of Representatives from the 2nd District, serving from 1995 to 2024. He is a member of the Republican party.

== Political career ==
Sandifer served as Chair of the House Labor, Commerce and Industry Committee.

=== 2024 South Carolina House race ===
See also: 2024 South Carolina elections, 2024 state legislature elections in the United States, South Carolina House of Representatives elections, 2024 South Carolina House of Representatives election

In March 2024, Sandifer filed for re-election. In the 2024 SC Republican primary, he was beaten by Adam Lewis Duncan.
