= B. R. Skelton =

American politician (1933–2025)

Member of the South Carolina House of Representatives from the 3rd district
- In office November 2002 – November 2014
- Preceded by: Byron K. Webb
- Succeeded by: Gary Clary

Personal details
- Born: Billy Ray Skelton; January 21, 1933 Westminster, South Carolina, U.S.
- Died: July 21, 2025 (aged 92)
- Party: Republican
- Spouse: Vickie Lynn Roach (m. 1990)
- Children: 4
- Occupation: Businessman

Billy Ray Skelton (January 21, 1933 – July 21, 2025) was an American politician who was a Republican member of the South Carolina House of Representatives.

== Education and professional career ==
Skelton was an alumnus of Clemson, receiving his B.S. and M.S., there in 1956 and 1958 respectively. He received his Ph.D at Duke University in 1964.

Skelton was a professor of economics at Clemson University. He also worked as a residential contractor, and real estate broker.

== Political career ==
Prior to his election to the South Carolina House, Skelton served on various committees and commissions for Pickens County.

He represented the 3rd District from 2002 to 2014.

== Death and legacy ==
Skelton died on July 21, 2025, at the age of 92.

In 2018, Skelton was recognized with concurrent resolution of both houses of the South Carolina Legislature naming the intersection of U.S. Highway 123 and S.C. Highway 93 in Clemson the “Dr. B.R. Skelton Interchange.”
