= Bobby Harrell =

American politician (born 1956)

- Harrell in 2011

59th Speaker of the South Carolina House of Representatives
- In office June 21, 2005 – October 23, 2014
- Preceded by: David Wilkins
- Succeeded by: Jay Lucas

Member of the South Carolina House of Representatives from the 114th district
- In office December 8, 1992 – October 23, 2014
- Preceded by: John C. Rama
- Succeeded by: Mary Tinkler

Personal details
- Born: Robert William Harrell Jr. March 7, 1956 (age 70) Orangeburg, South Carolina, U.S.
- Party: Republican
- Spouse: Catherine Smith
- Children: 2
- Education: University of South Carolina
- Profession: Insurance agency owner

Robert William Harrell Jr. (born March 7, 1956) is an American politician and member of the Republican Party who served as a member of the South Carolina House of Representatives, representing the 114th District, from 1992 to 2014, serving as the Speaker of the House from 2005 to 2014.

== Early political career ==
Harrell was the chairman of his Freshman Caucus in 1993. Two years after Harrell was elected, he was appointed to serve on the Ways and Means Committee in 1994. Later, he was elected to serve as Majority Leader from 1997 to 1999 when he became the Ways and Means Committee Chairman in 1999. He has also served as Chairman of the Economic Development and the Public Education Subcommittee of the Ways and Means Committee. In South Carolina, State Legislators serve as part-time employees making only $10,400 per year.

== Business career ==
Harrell earned his Bachelor of Science in Business Administration from the University of South Carolina. He opened an insurance agency representing State Farm Insurance in 1980. In 2010, after his father died, Harrell combined his agency with that of his father in Harrell Square, a shopping center owned by the family. He and his wife Cathy opened an independent insurance agency, Harrell Insurance Agency in 2014. They now represent over 100 companies such as Progressive, Liberty Mutual, Travelers, Nationwide, Allstate and many more. He previously owned Palmetto State Pharmaceuticals, a pharmaceutical repackaging company that he sold in 2012.

== Political career ==
=== Promotion of economic development ===
Harrell is credited with negotiating the deal on behalf of the House that brought Boeing to Charleston to build the 787 Dreamliner. He was also instrumental in bringing Southwest and JetBlue as carriers to the Charleston Airport.

In 2008, Harrell, legislative leaders and business executives formed the Knowledge Sector Council. In an effort to support South Carolina’s growing knowledge-based economy, the public/private Council was created to encourage research universities, economic development entities, private businesses and state agencies to work together in expanding jobs and economic opportunity.

In 2010, Harrell sponsored the S.C. Economic Development Competitiveness Act.

== Election as Speaker of the House ==
Harrell ran unopposed as Speaker in 2006 and 2008, and 2012. In 2010, Harrell had a token opponent for Speaker when Ralph Norman challenged Harrell for the Speaker’s office. Harrell was re-elected, defeating Norman who only drew five votes of support – including his own vote – among the 124 House members. As Speaker of the House, Harrell effectively controlled policy in South Carolina alongside Hugh Leatherman and Glenn F. McConnell during Governor Mark Sanford's administration.

=== Political contributions ===
In 2010, Harrell received the largest amount of political contributions – $47,425, or nearly 22 percent – from lawyers and lobbyists, according to OpenSecrets. The next largest amount, $30,100, came from health professionals. In 2008, Harrell received $361,053 in contributions. The largest contributing industries were real estate ($29,825), and lawyers and lobbyists ($28,000).

=== Campaign contributions and receipts ===
In September 2012, The Post and Courier reported that Harrell had reimbursed himself more than $325,000 from his campaign war chest since 2008 but had produced no receipts or itemized invoices accounting for the spending. Harrell informed The Post and Courier that all his expenses were legitimate and the reimbursements were less than the fair market value.

Harrell provided receipts to an Associated Press reporter who reported that the receipts and invoices were in order.

In October 2014 Harrell pleaded guilty to six counts of misusing campaign money; he was fined $30,000 and required to pay $94,000 to the State’s general fund, received three years of probation, was required to resign his office and was barred from public office for three years.

Even though he had left office, and was not seeking office, it was too late to remove his name from the ballot in the 2014 elections. Democratic nominee Mary Tinkler received the most votes for the seat, but Harrell still carried Dorchester County even with signs in the polling places stating that he had withdrawn from the election.

== Personal life ==
Harrell has been married to his wife Cathy since July 1979 and they current reside in Charleston, SC. They have two children, Trey & Charlotte, as well as two grandchildren.
