= Seth Whipper =

American politician

Member of the South Carolina House of Representatives from the 113th district
- In office 1995–2017
- Preceded by: Lucille Whipper
- Succeeded by: Marvin R. Pendarvis

Personal details
- Born: June 27, 1949 (age 77) Charleston, South Carolina, U.S.
- Party: Democratic

Jackson Seth Whipper (born June 27, 1949) is an American judge and politician. He was a member of the South Carolina House of Representatives from the 113th District, serving from 1995 to 2017. He is a member of the Democratic party. He resigned from the legislature in 2017 to become a magistrate judge in Charleston County.

His mother, Lucille Whipper, was also a representative.
