= Lester P. Branham Jr. =

American politician

Lester P. Branham, Jr.

Member of the South Carolina House of Representatives from the 61st district 2002–2014
- Preceded by: Harry R. Askins
- Succeeded by: Roger K. Kirby

Personal details
- Born: December 14, 1933 Camden, South Carolina, United States
- Died: October 22, 2023 (aged 89) Florence, South Carolina, US
- Party: Democratic
- Children: 2
- Education: Wake Forest University
- Profession: Retired Minister

Lester Province Branham Jr. (December 14, 1933 – October 22, 2023) was an American minister and politician.

== Political career ==
Branham was the member of the South Carolina House of Representatives from the 61st District, serving in the House from 2002 to 2014, and was a member of the House Education and Public Works Committee. Branham was a member of the Democratic party. His father, L. P. 'Doc' Branham Sr., was a member of the State Legislature in the 1950s, and also served on the South Carolina Public Service Commission.

== Community service ==
Branham served on the Board of Trustees of Florence County School District Three, Midwestern Theological Seminary in Missouri, and Furman University. He served as board chair of Baptist Hospital and Palmetto Health Care System in Columbia.

== Death ==
Branham died on October 22, 2023. Governor Henry McMaster announced that flags would be lowered in the late Senator's honor. On October 25, 2023, Executive Order 2023-37 was filed for that purpose.
