= Jay Lucas =

American politician and attorney

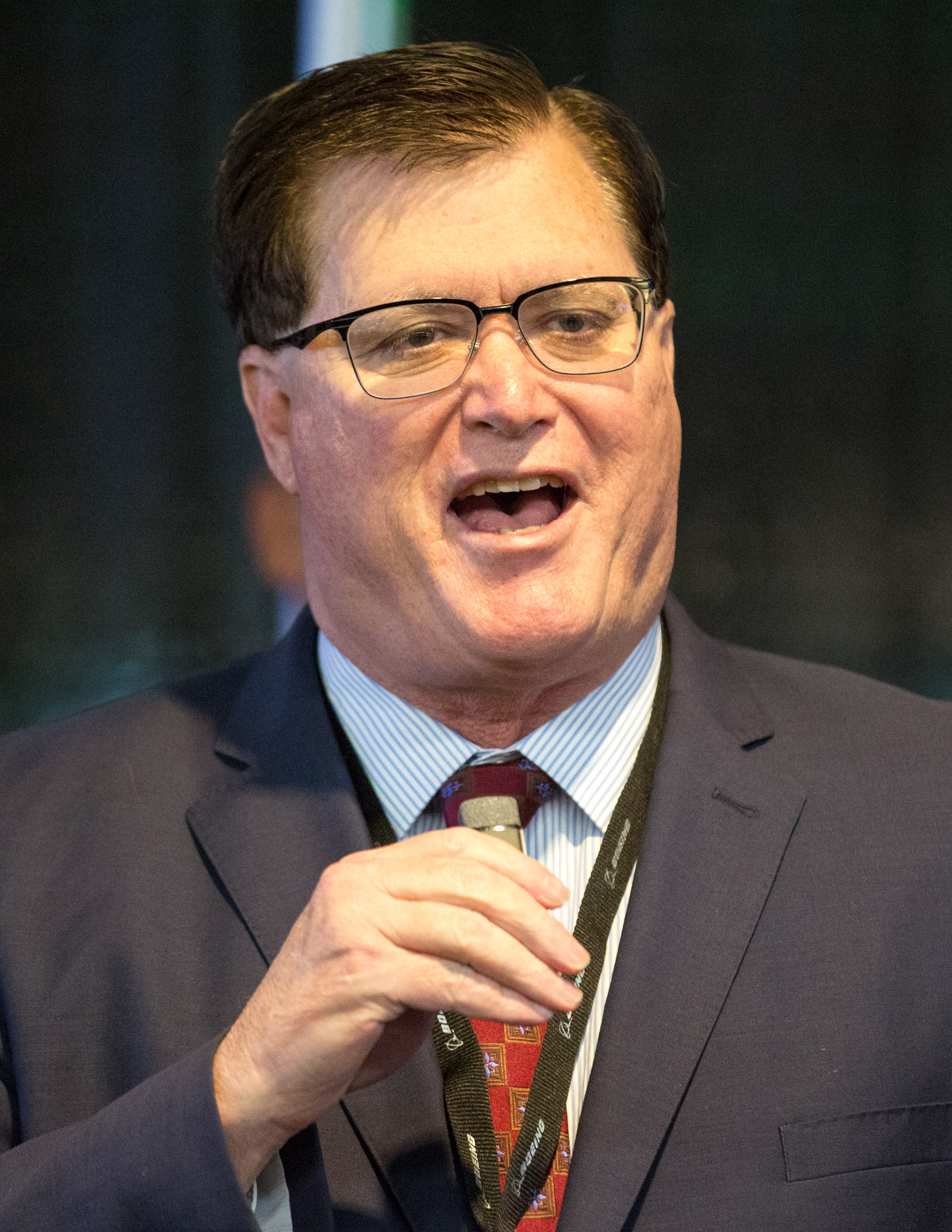

60th Speaker of the South Carolina House of Representatives
- In office December 2, 2014 – May 12, 2022
- Preceded by: Bobby Harrell
- Succeeded by: Murrell Smith

Member of the South Carolina House of Representatives from the 65th district
- In office December 1, 1998 – December 6, 2022
- Preceded by: John Michael Baxley
- Succeeded by: Cody Mitchell

Personal details
- Born: James Howle Lucas; August 11, 1957 (age 68) Columbia, South Carolina, U.S.
- Party: Republican
- Spouse: Tracy Deglman
- Education: University of South Carolina (BA, MPA, JD)

James Howle "Jay" Lucas (born August 11, 1957) is an American politician and attorney. He served as a member of the South Carolina House of Representatives from the 65th District from 1999 to 2022. Lucas is a Republican.

Lucas was elected Speaker of the House in December 2014 after the resignation of Bobby Harrell. On March 15, 2022, he announced his decision to not run for reelection to the South Carolina House. He was succeeded as speaker by Murrell Smith.

== Political career ==
Lucas's political career began in the 1980s as he held various local positions. From 1982 to 1984, he served as the financial director for Bennettsville. From 1984 to 1986, he was county administrator of Fairfield County. From 1990 to 1994, he was the county attorney for Darlington County, and from 1995 to 1996, was a judge for Hartsville in Darlington.

Lucas entered state level politics in 1998 when he became the Republican nominee for South Carolina House of Representatives District 65, which was being vacated by incumbent Democrat Michael Baxley. On November 3, 1998, Lucas defeated Democratic nominee Tony Floyd by less than forty votes. He became the first Republican to hold the seat since the Reconstruction era.

On December 2, 2014, Lucas became the 60th Speaker of the South Carolina House of Representatives following the resignation of Speaker Bobby Harrell. He would hold the position of Speaker for the next eight years. He retired from the position on May 12, 2022. The house elected Murrell Smith as Lucas' successor.

Political offices
Preceded by Bobby Harrell	Speaker of the South Carolina House of Representatives; 2014–2022	Succeeded by Murrell Smith Jr.
