= Murrell Smith Jr. =

American politician

Murrell Smith
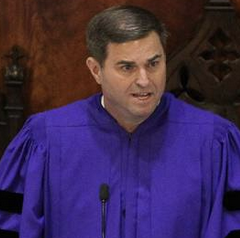

61st Speaker of the South Carolina House of Representatives
- Incumbent
- Assumed office May 12, 2022
- Preceded by: Jay Lucas

Member of the South Carolina House of Representatives from the 67th district
- Incumbent
- Assumed office November 13, 2000
- Preceded by: Mac McLeod

Personal details
- Born: George Murrell Smith Jr. May 15, 1968 (age 58) Florence, South Carolina, U.S.
- Party: Republican
- Spouse: Macaulay White (m. 2004)
- Children: 2
- Education: Wofford College (BA); University of South Carolina (JD)

George Murrell Smith Jr. (born May 15, 1968) is an American politician and the 61st Speaker of the South Carolina House of Representatives. Since 2001, he has represented the 67th district of South Carolina for Sumter and Sumter County.

== Early life and education ==
Born on May 15, 1968, in Florence, South Carolina, Smith spent the majority of his childhood in Sumter, South Carolina, where he attended Wilson Hall School. He graduated in 1986 and enrolled at Wofford College, where he completed his B.A. in History and Government in 1990. After earning his J.D. from the University of South Carolina School of Law in 1993, Smith began practicing law in his hometown of Sumter: as a public defender and as a partner at Lee, Erter, Wilson, Holler & Smith, LLC.

== Political career ==
George Smith was elected to the South Carolina House of Representatives from the 67th District in 2001, and has held this seat since. He is a member of the Republican Party. In his time as a representative, he has mostly run in uncontested races, barring Libertarian Party challenger, Brandon Humphries, whom he overwhelmingly defeated.

On December 5, 2018, Smith was appointed as chairman of the House Ways and Means Committee by Speaker of the House Jay Lucas. Smith previously served as chairman of the Health and Human Services Subcommittee and has sat on the House Ways and Means Committee since 2009.

In April 2022, Smith was elected unanimously by the House to succeed Jay Lucas as Speaker of the House of Representatives. He assumed office on May 12, 2022. Smith was challenged by Bill Chumley, a member of the South Carolina Freedom Caucus, for the position in December 2024, and defeated him in a 102–17 vote.

Since Dobbs v. Jackson Women's Health Organization, Smith has been vocal in his support for restricting access to abortion in the state of South Carolina. After the South Carolina Supreme Court voted 3–2 to nullify a six-week abortion ban, Smith criticized the court as creating “a constitutional right to an abortion where none exists.”

== Electoral history ==
=== 2008 SC House of Representatives ===
In 2008, Smith ran unopposed in both the primary and general election.

=== 2010 SC House of Representatives ===
In 2010, Smith ran unopposed in both the primary and general election.

=== 2012 SC House of Representatives ===
Smith ran unopposed in the Republican primary in 2012.

South Carolina House of Representatives District 67 General Election, 2012
Party	Candidate	Votes	%
Republican	Murrell Smith Jr. (incumbent)	11,696	99.1
Other	Write-Ins	106	0.9
Total votes		11,802	100.0
Republican hold			

=== 2014 SC House of Representatives ===
In 2014, Smith ran unopposed in both the primary and general election.

=== 2016 SC House of Representatives ===
In 2016, Smith ran unopposed in both the primary and general election.

2016 South Carolina House of Representatives District 67 election
Party	Candidate	Votes	%
Republican	Murrell Smith Jr.	11,808	98.9%
Write-in		135	1.1%
Total votes		11,943	100.0%

=== 2018 SC House of Representatives ===
Smith ran uncontested in the Republican primary in 2018.

South Carolina House of Representatives District 67 General Election, 2018
Party	Candidate	Votes	%
Republican	Murrell Smith Jr. (incumbent)	8,640	82.2
Libertarian	Brandon Humphries	1,811	17.2
Write-in		64	0.6
Total votes		10,515	100.0
Republican hold			

=== 2020 SC House of Representatives ===
The Republican primary was cancelled in 2020.

South Carolina House of Representatives District 67 General Election, 2020
Party	Candidate	Votes	%
Republican	Murrell Smith Jr. (incumbent)	13,834	97.3
Other	Write-ins	390	2.7
Total votes		14,224	100.0
Republican hold			

=== 2022 SC House of Representatives ===
The Republican primary was cancelled in 2022.

South Carolina House of Representatives District 67 General Election, 2022
Party	Candidate	Votes	%
Republican	Murrell Smith Jr. (incumbent)	9,705	98.4
Other	Write-in	155	1.6
Total votes		9,860	100.0
Republican hold			

=== 2024 SC House of Representatives ===
2024 South Carolina House of Representatives District 67 election
Party	Candidate	Votes	%
Republican	Murrell Smith Jr.	13,683	98.4%
Write-in		221	1.6%
Total votes		13,904	100.0%

== Personal life ==
Smith and his wife, Macaulay, have two children.

Political offices
Preceded by Jay Lucas	Speaker of the South Carolina House of Representatives; 2022–present	Incumbent
