= Speaker of the South Carolina House of Representatives =

U.S. state government position

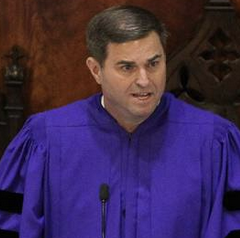
- Incumbent; Murrell Smith, Jr. since May 12, 2022
- Member of: South Carolina House of Representatives
- Nominator: Election by House
- Term length: 4 years, 5-term limit
- Inaugural holder: James Parsons
- Formation: 1776
- Salary: $33,400 + $140 per diem

The speaker of the South Carolina House of Representatives is the presiding officer of the South Carolina House of Representatives, whose main role is to ensure that general order is maintained in the house by recognizing members to speak, ensuring members are following established rules, and to call for votes. The speaker is third in the line of succession behind the lieutenant governor and the president of the senate. The current speaker is Murrell Smith, Jr., a Republican who has held the position since May 12, 2022.

== History ==
James Parsons was the first speaker of the South Carolina House of Representatives, elected in 1776 after the adoption of South Carolina's first constitution. Since 1776, there have been sixty-one speakers of the house. Four speakers have served non-consecutive terms, but unlike the office of governor where each office holder is counted once regardless of terms served, speakers are counted separately for each time in office. Therefore, for example, Solomon Blatt Sr. was the 50th and the 53rd speaker.

== Election ==
The speaker is elected by a simple majority vote to a two-year term following the most recent general election and may not serve more than five consecutive terms. Incumbent Speaker Murrell Smith was elected intra-term in 2022 following the resignation of Jay Lucas. Since 1776, there have been 34 Democrats, 9 Democratic-Republicans, 8 Republicans, 8 Independents, and 2 Nullifiers. The speaker pro tempore presides in the speaker's absence.

== Roles and responsibilities ==
The speaker of the house "preserve[s] order and decorum" in the chamber and oversees the proceeding of the House of Representatives by recognizing members to speak, calling for votes, and maintaining general order. The speaker also serves an ex officio member of the Committee on Operations and Managementof the House of Representatives. Additionally, the speaker of the house has the ability to do the following:

- Call for a special election after an inter-term vacancy in the senate
- Appoint members all committees, but must ensure that both the majority and minority parties are represented
- Adjourn the house without a vote in cases of emergency
- If a quorum is not present, the speaker may order absent members to be taken into custody and brought into the house chamber.

=== Succession to governorship ===
The speaker of the house is third in the gubernatorial line of succession. If the governor, lieutenant governor, and President of the South Carolina Senate are unable to serve as governor, the speaker of the house becomes governor. Since the role of lieutenant governor was separated from president of the senate, no president has succeeded to the office of governor.

== List of speakers ==
List of speakers of the South Carolina House of Representatives
#	Speaker	Party	Term of office	Notes
1	James Parsons	None	March 26, 1776 – October 1776	
2	John Matthews	None	December 1776 – Spring of 1777	
3	Thomas Bee	None	Summer of 1777 – November 1778	
4	John Matthews	None	January 1779 – December 1779	2nd Time
5	Thomas Farr	None	1779 – 1782	
6	Hugh Rutledge	None	1782 – 1785	
7	John Faucheraud Grimké	None	1785 – 1787	
8	John Julius Pringle	Federalist	1787 – 1789	
9	Jacob Read	Federalist	1789 – 1795	
10	Robert Barnwell	Federalist	1795 – 1798	
11	William Johnson	Democratic-Republican	1798 – 1800	
12	Theodore Gaillard	Democratic-Republican	1800 – 1802	
13	Robert Stork	Democratic-Republican	1802 – 1804	
14	William Cotesworth Pinckney	Democratic-Republican	1804 – 1805	
15	Joseph Alston	Democratic-Republican	1805 – 1810	
16	John Geddes	Democratic-Republican	1810 – 1814	
17	Thomas Bennett Jr.	Democratic-Republican	1814 – 1818	
18	Patrick Noble	Democratic-Republican	1818 – 1824	
19	John Belton O'Neall	Democratic-Republican	1824 – 1828	
20	Benjamin Fanuel Dunkin	Nullifier (Democratic)	1828 – 1830	
21	Henry L. Pinckney	Nullifier (Democratic)	1830 – 1833	
22	Patrick Noble	Democratic	1833 – 1836	2nd time Changed parties
23	David Lewis Wardlaw	Democratic	1836 – 1842	
24	William F. Colcock	Democratic	1842 – 1848	
25	John Izard Middleton	Democratic	1848 – 1850	
26	James Simons Sr.	Democratic	1850 – 1862	
27	Alfred P. Aldrich	Democratic	1862 – 1864	
28	R. B. Boyleston	Democratic	1864 – 1865	Deposed by Union Army
29	Charles Henry Simonton	None	1865 – 1868	
30	Franklin J. Moses Jr.	Republican	1868 – 1872	
31	Samuel Jones Lee	Republican	1872 – 1874	
32	R. B. Elliot	Republican	1874 – 1876	
33	William Henry Wallace	Democratic	1876 – 1876	
34	John Calhoun Sheppard	Democratic	1877 – 1882	
35	James Simons Jr.	Democratic	1882 – 1890	
36	John L. M. Irby	Democratic	1890 – 1891	
37	Ira B. Jones	Democratic	1891 – 1896	
38	Frank B. Gary	Democratic	1896 – 1901	
39	William Francis Stevenson	Democratic	1901 – 1903	
40	Mendel L. Smith	Democratic	1903 – 1907	
41	Richard S. Whaley	Democratic	1907 – 1911	
42	Mendel L. Smith	Democratic	1911 – 1915	2nd Time
43	James Hoyt	Democratic	1915 – 1918	
44	Thomas P. Cothran	Democratic	1918 – 1921	
45	John Buford Atkinson	Democratic	1921 – 1923	
46	Thomas S. McMillan	Democratic	1923 – 1925	
47	Edgar Allan Brown	Democratic	1925 – 1926	
48	John K. Hamblin	Democratic	1927 – 1933	
49	James B. Gibson	Democratic	1933 – 1934	Died
50	Claude A. Taylor	Democratic	1935 – 1936	
51	Solomon Blatt Sr.	Democratic	1935 – 1936	
52	C. Bruce Littlejohn	Democratic	1947 – 1949	
53	Thomas H. Pope	Democratic	1949 – 1950	
54	Solomon Blatt Sr.	Democratic	1951 – August 1, 1973	2nd Time
55	Rex L. Carter	Democratic	1973 – August 1, 1980	
56	Ramon Schwartz Jr.	Democratic	1981 – October 1, 1986	
57	Robert Sheheen	Democratic	1987 – October 1, 1994	
58	David Wilkins	Republican	December 6, 1994 – June 21, 2005	
59	Bobby Harrell	Republican	June 21, 2005 – October 23, 2014	
60	Jay Lucas	Republican	December 2, 2014 – May 12, 2022	
61	Murrell Smith Jr.	Republican	May 12, 2022 – Incumbent	

== See also ==
- List of South Carolina state legislatures
