= List of people from Charleston, South Carolina =

Flag of Charleston, South Carolina

The following people were born in, residents of, or otherwise closely associated with Charleston, South Carolina, United States (categorized by area in which each person is best known).

== Academia ==
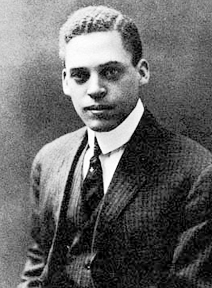
Ernest Everett Just

- Glover Crane Arnold (1849–1906), instructor of anatomy and surgery at Bellevue Hospital Medical College and New York University's Medical College
- Rick Brewer (born 1956), former administrator at Charleston Southern University; current president of Louisiana College in Pineville, Louisiana
- Robert Furchgott (1916–2009), biochemist and Nobel laureate
- Ernest Everett Just (1883–1941), biologist
- Elias Marks (1790–1886), founder of South Carolina Female Collegiate Institute
- William Ephraim Mikell (1868–1944), dean of the University of Pennsylvania Law School, a summer home in Charleston
- William Charles Wells (1757–1817), physician
- Nolan R. Williams (1982–2025), neuropsychiatrist who helped develop SAINT-TMS

== Art and architecture ==
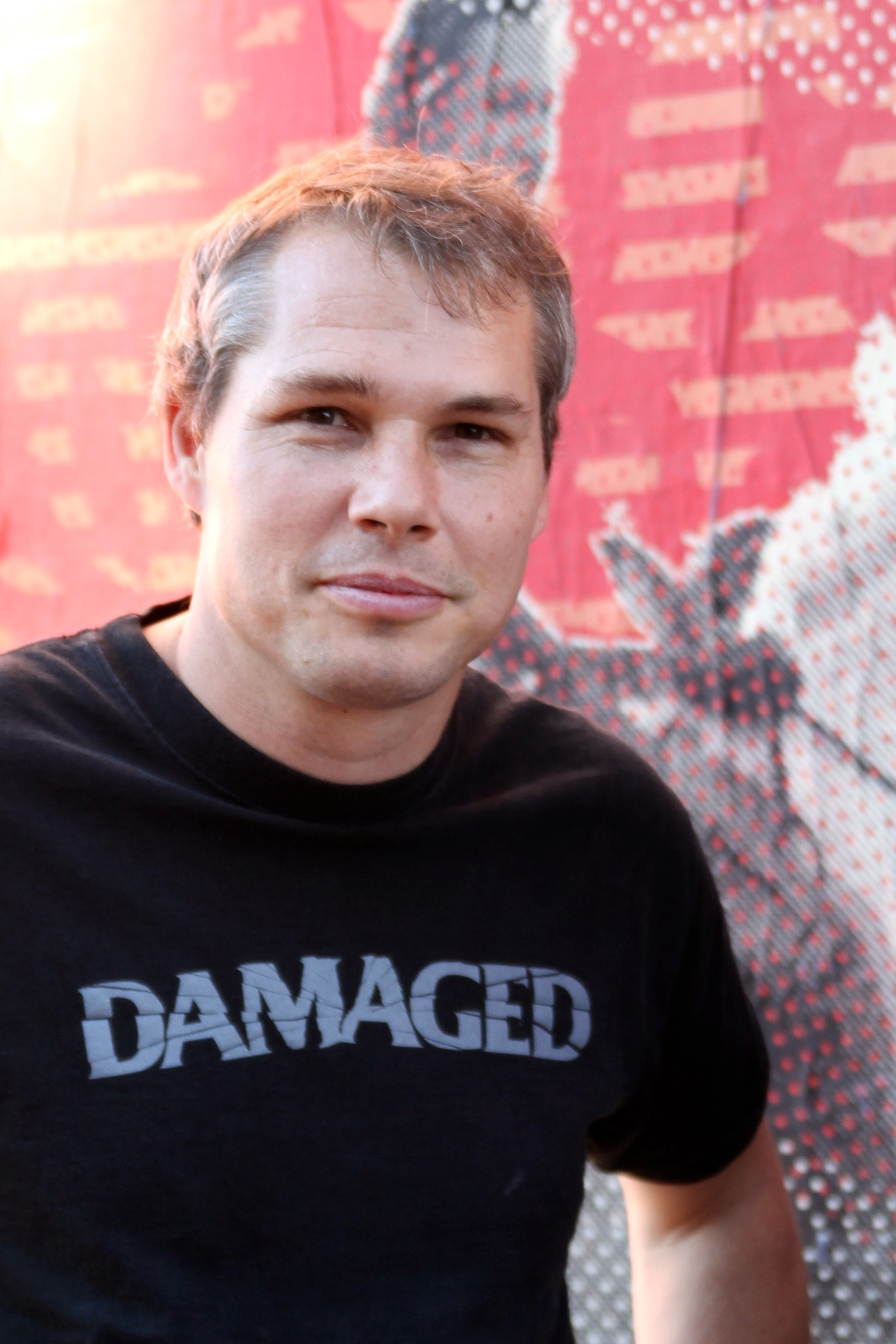
Shepard Fairey

- David Carson (born 1956), graphic designer
- Shepard Fairey (born 1970), artist known for Andre the Giant "Obey" and Barack Obama "Hope" stencil pieces
- Jessica Hische (born 1984), illustrator
- Robert Mills (1781–1855), architect
- James C. Saltus (1837–1883), carpenter
- Philip Simmons (1912–2009), ironworker
- Stella F. Simon (1878–1973), photographer
- Merton Simpson (1928–2013), abstract expressionist artist, African art collector, musician
- Elizabeth O'Neill Verner (1883–1979), artist, author, lecturer, and preservationist
- Daniel Robertson (1778-1849), architect active in Britain and Ireland

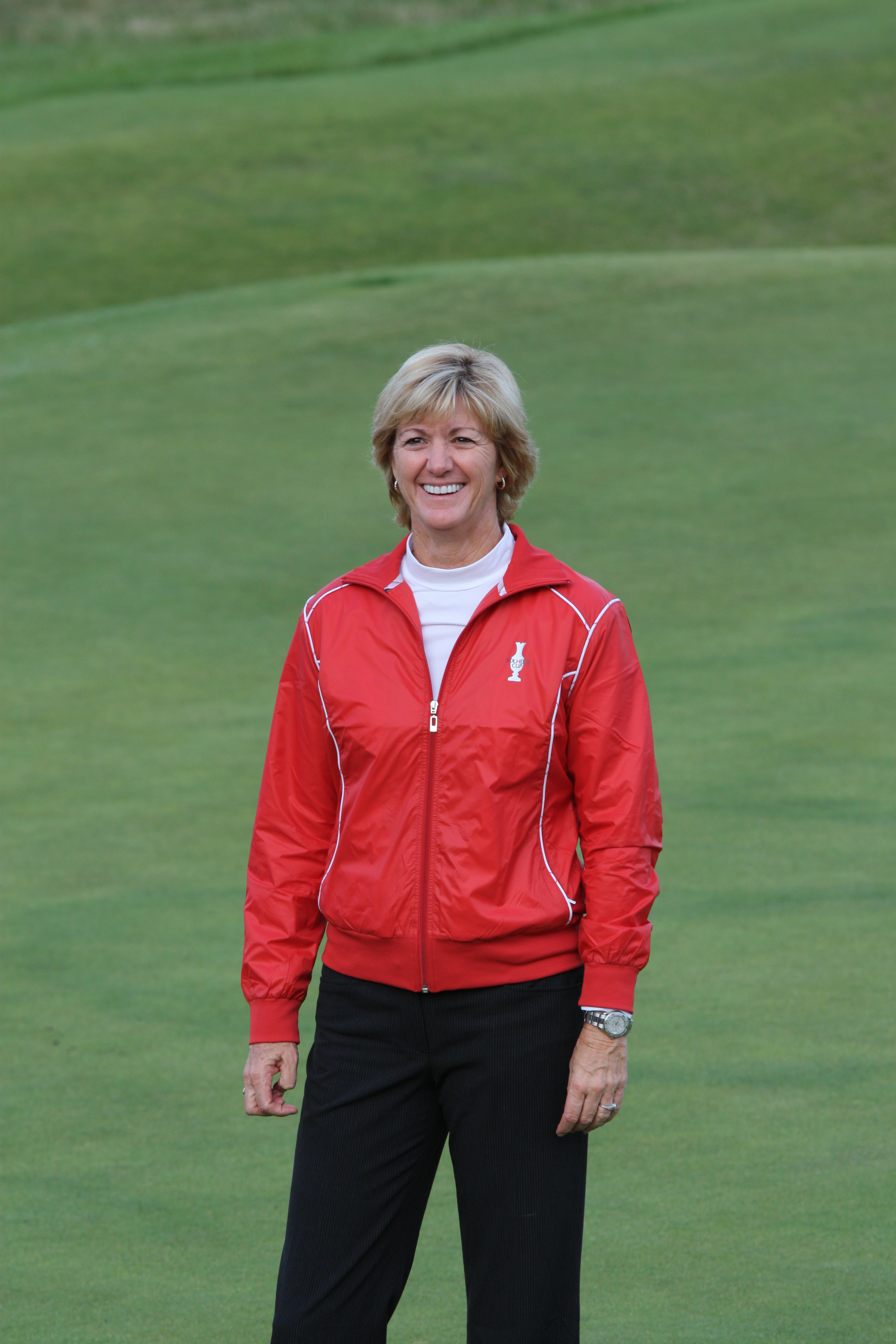
Beth Daniel

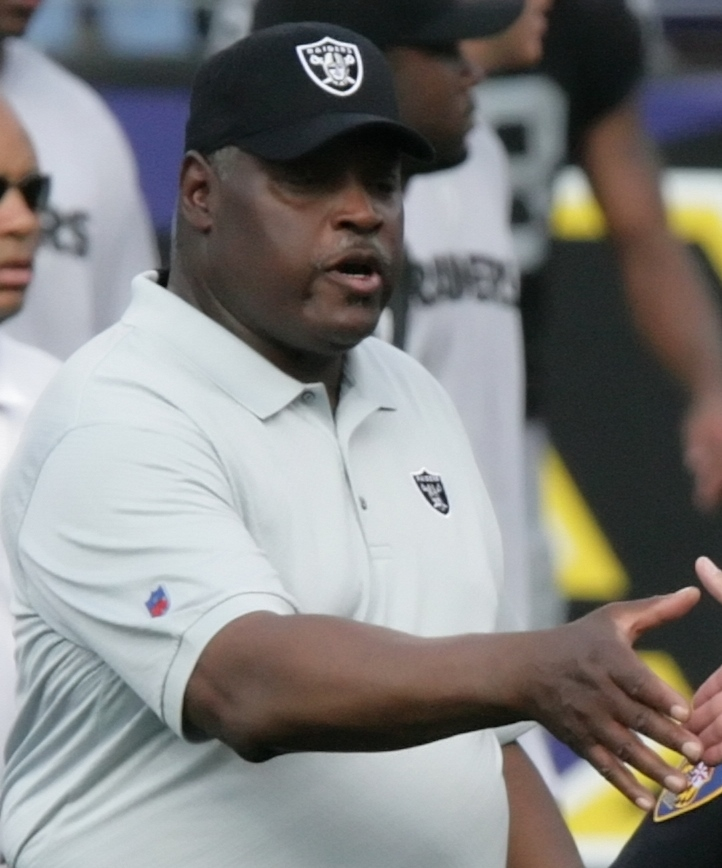
Art Shell

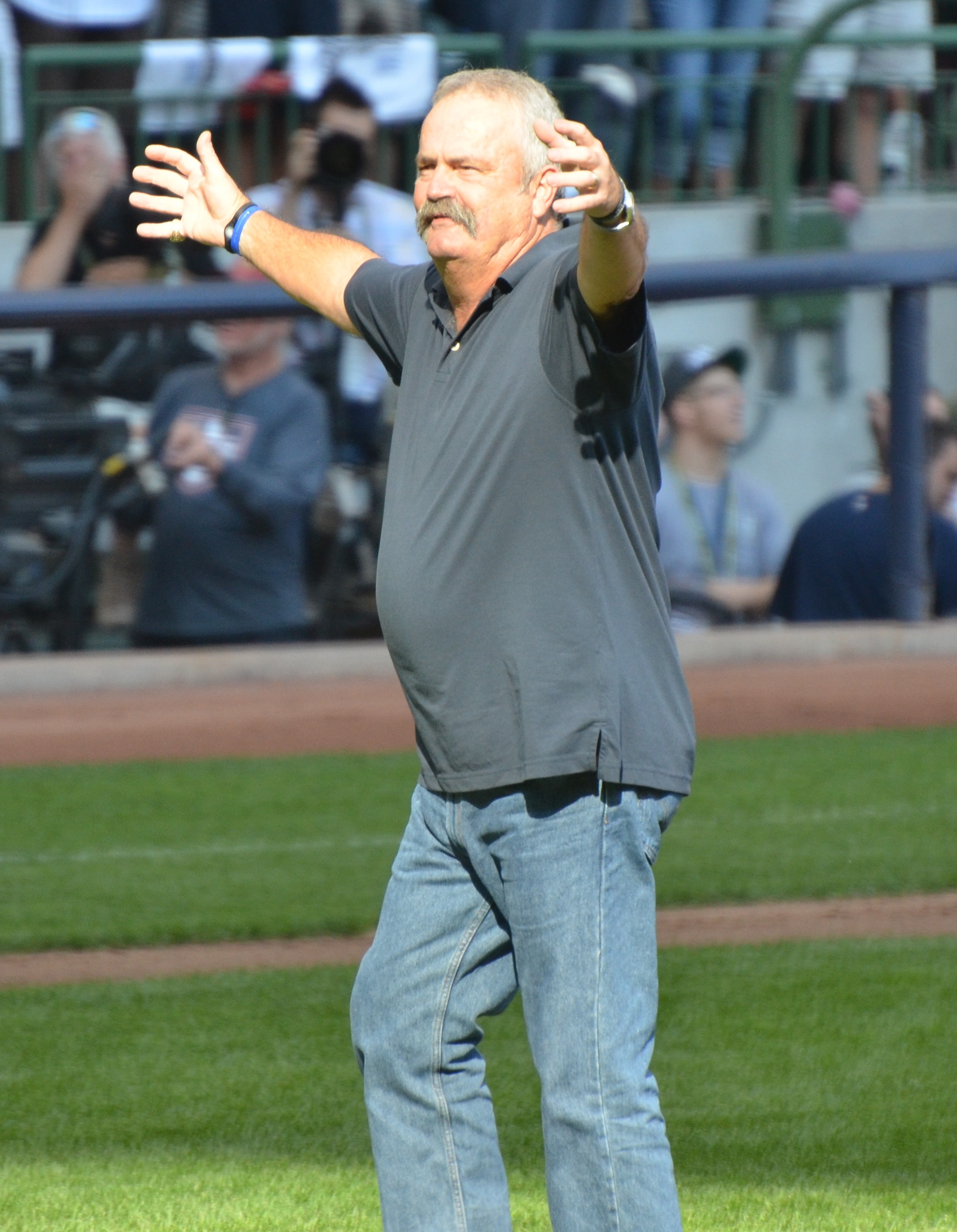
Gorman Thomas

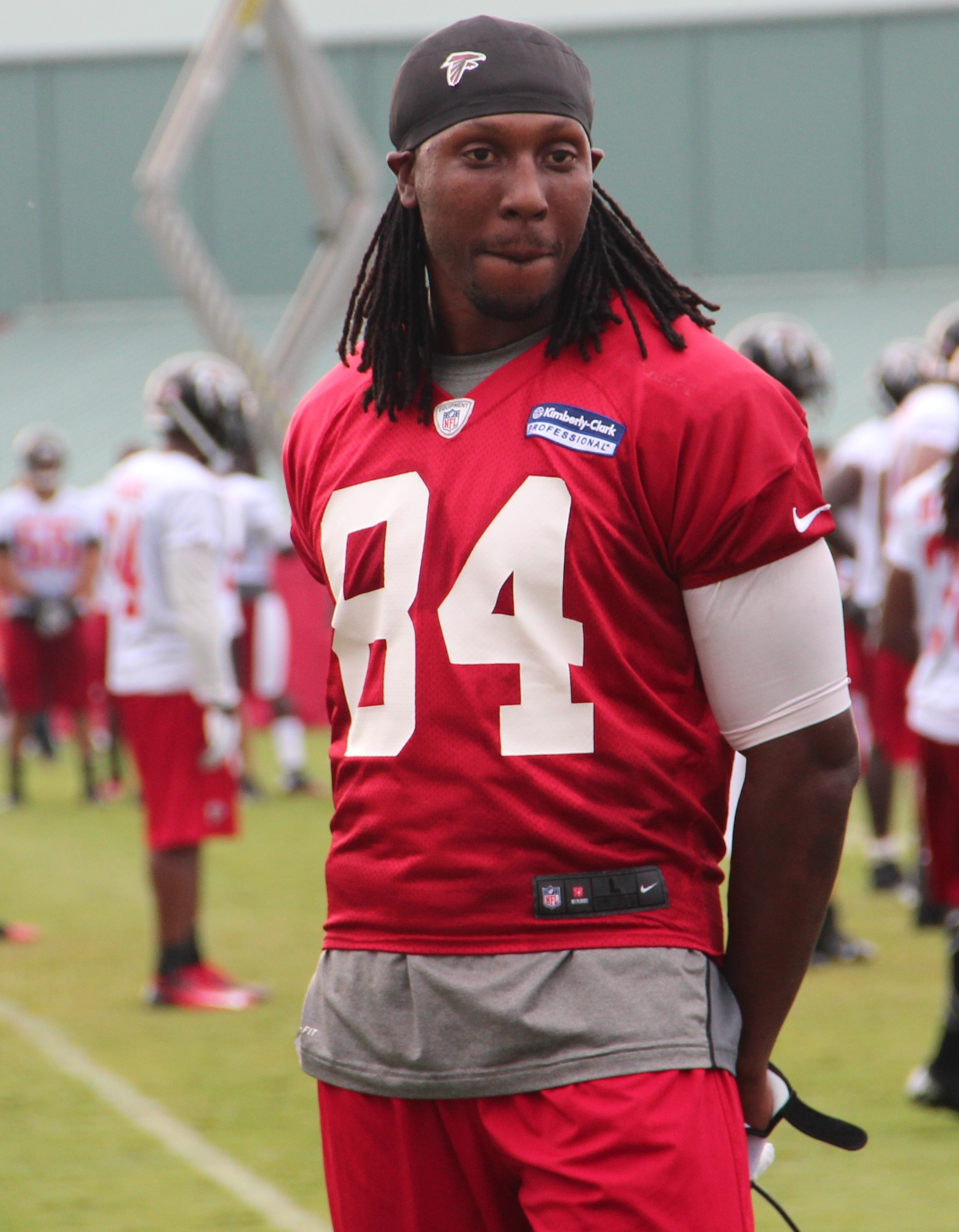
Roddy White

== Athletics ==
- Jarrell Brantley (born 1996), basketball player
- Luther Broughton (born 1974), NFL player
- Nehemiah Broughton (born 1982), NFL player
- Kwame Brown (born 1982), basketball player
- Joel Bunting (born 1997), soccer player
- Jasmine Camacho-Quinn (born 1996), Olympic gold medalist/ hurdler
- Garrett Chisolm (born 1988), NFL player
- Beth Daniel (born 1956), professional golfer
- Zola Davis (born 1975), NFL and XFL player
- Carlos Dunlap (born 1989), NFL player
- Oronde Gadsden (born 1971), NFL player
- A. J. Green (born 1988), NFL player
- Harold Green (born 1968), NFL player
- Josiah-Jordan James (born 2000), basketball forward in the Israeli Basketball Premier League
- Anthony Johnson (born 1974), NBA player
- Javon Kinlaw (born 1997), NFL player
- Byron Maxwell (born 1988), NFL player
- Katrina McClain Johnson (born 1965), Olympic gold medalist; retired WNBA player
- Tre McLean (born 1993), basketball player in the Israeli Basketball Premier League
- David Meggett (born 1966), NFL player
- Khris Middleton (born 1991), NBA player
- Bud Moore (born 1941), NASCAR driver
- Langston Moore (born 1981), former NFL player
- Ovie Mughelli (born 1980), NFL player
- Josh Powell (born 1983), NBA player
- Laron Profit (born 1977), NBA player
- Robert Quinn (born 1990), NFL player
- Vicente Reyes (born 2003), soccer player
- Edmond Robinson (born 1992), NFL player
- Art Shell (born 1946), NFL player and coach
- Brandon Shell (born 1992), NFL player
- Gorman Thomas (born 1950), MLB player
- Roddy White (born 1981), NFL player
- Dennis Williams (born 1965), basketball player

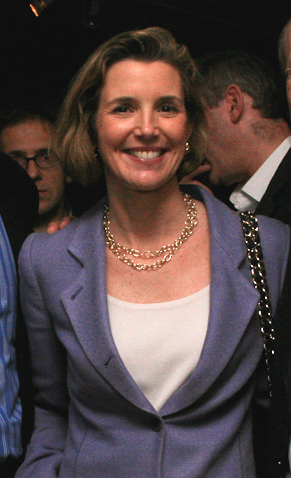
Sallie Krawcheck

== Business ==
- Bill Backer (1926–2016), advertising executive known for Coca-Cola campaigns
- James Gadsden (1788–1858), U.S. minister to Mexico; president of the South Carolina Railroad Company
- Sallie Krawcheck (born 1964), Citigroup chief financial officer
- Joseph Wragg (1698–1751), pioneer of the large-scale slave trade and member and president of the South Carolina Executive Council

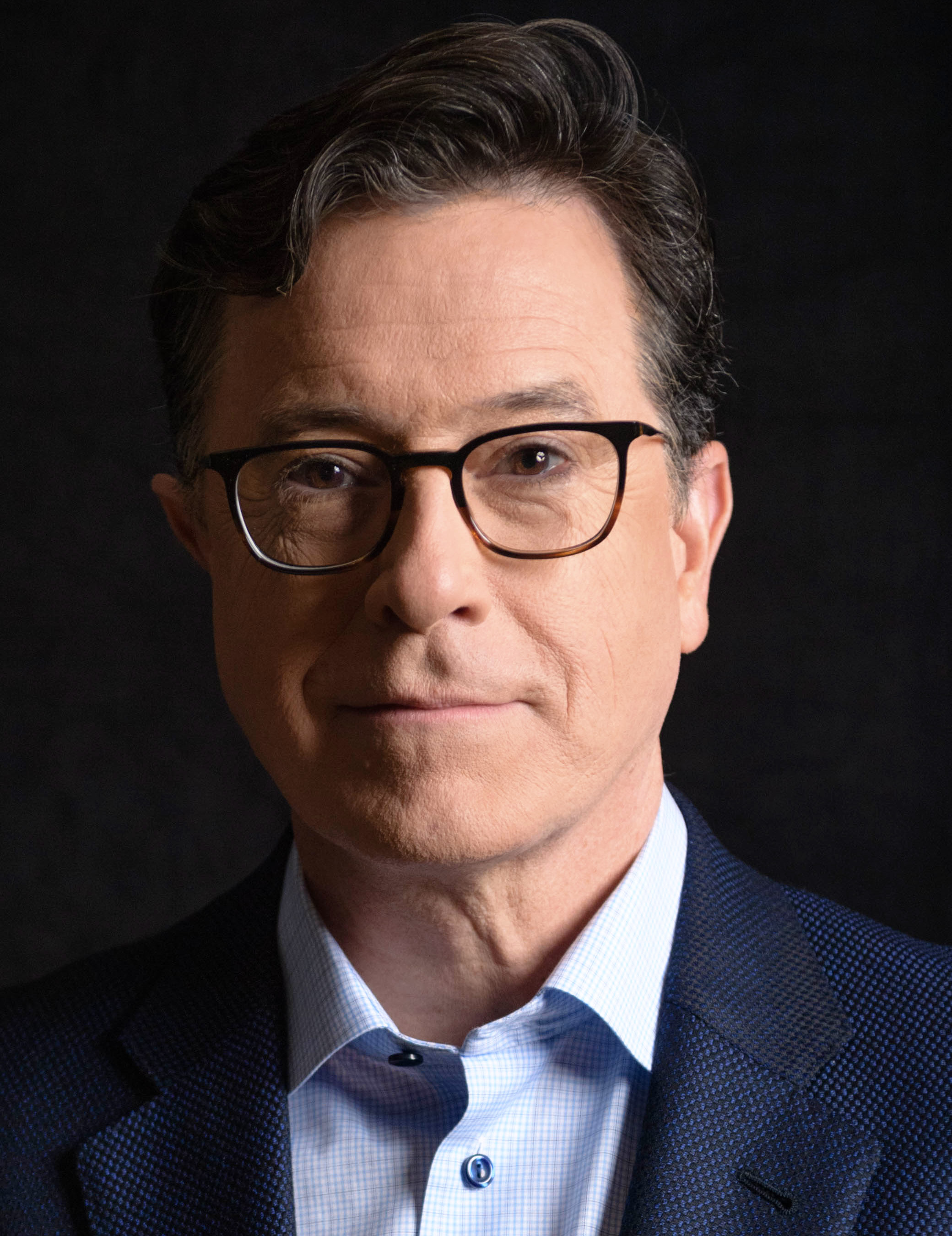
Stephen Colbert

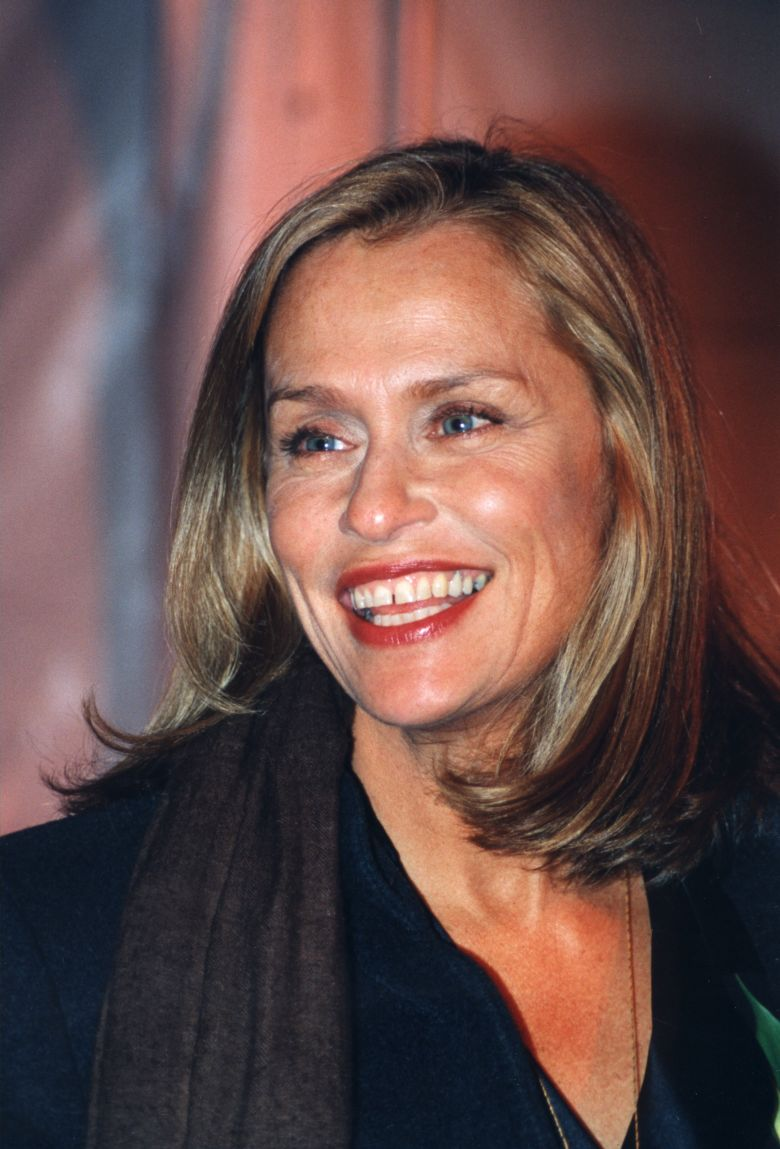
Lauren Hutton

== Entertainment ==
- William Abbott (1790–1843), manager of the New Charleston Theatre
- Akim Anastopoulo (born 1960), television judge "Extreme Akim" on Eye for an Eye and trial attorney
- Angry Grandpa (1950–2017), internet personality
- Frank Birnbaum (1922–2005), 20th-century classical composer and Jewish cantor
- Kardea Brown (born 1987), Emmy-nominated chef, author and Food Network host
- Ckay1 (born 1982), music composer, arranger, and producer
- Stephen Colbert (born 1964), comedian
- Joel Derfner (born 1973), musical theater composer
- Andy Dick (born 1965), comedian
- A Fragile Tomorrow, indie rock band
- Arthur Freed (1894–1973), Hollywood producer, composer, and writer
- Thomas Gibson (born 1962), actor
- Shanola Hampton (born 1977), actress
- Dubose Heyward (1885–1940), writer and lyricist, Porgy and Bess
- Bertha Hill (1905–1950), blues and vaudeville singer
- Lauren Hutton (born 1943), actress
- Dom Kelly (born 1991), activist, founder of New Disabled South, and member of rock band A Fragile Tomorrow
- Mabel King (1932–1999), actress
- Vanessa Joy Lachey (née Minnillo) (born 1980), Miss USA 1998, MTV VJ, and Entertainment Tonight correspondent
- Jonathan Mangum (born 1976), actor
- Logan Marshall-Green (born 1976), actor
- Micah McLaurin (born 1994), pianist
- Will Patton (born 1954), actor
- Grace Peixotto (born 1817), madam
- Mackenzie Rosman (born 1989), actress
- Darius Rucker (born 1966), lead singer of Hootie & the Blowfish, and country star
- David Stahl (1949–2010), conductor
- Josh Strickland (born 1983), singer and actor
- Elise Testone (born 1983), singer, American Idol contestant
- Melanie Thornton (1967–2001), singer, member of La Bouche
- Johnny Wactor (1986–2014), actor
- Matt Watson (born 1996), YouTuber, member and co-founder of SuperMega

== Law ==
- James Francis Byrnes (1879–1972), U.S. representative and senator, associate justice of the Supreme Court, secretary of state, and governor of South Carolina
- George Heriot DeReef (1869–1937), lawyer, political candidate, civil rights leader, and businessman
- William Drayton Sr. (1733–1790), associate justice of South Carolina Supreme Court
- Reuben Greenberg (1943–2014), first Black police chief of Charleston
- J. Waites Waring (1880–1968), United States District Court for District of South Carolina judge; part of a three-judge panel that heard school desegregation case Briggs v. Elliott

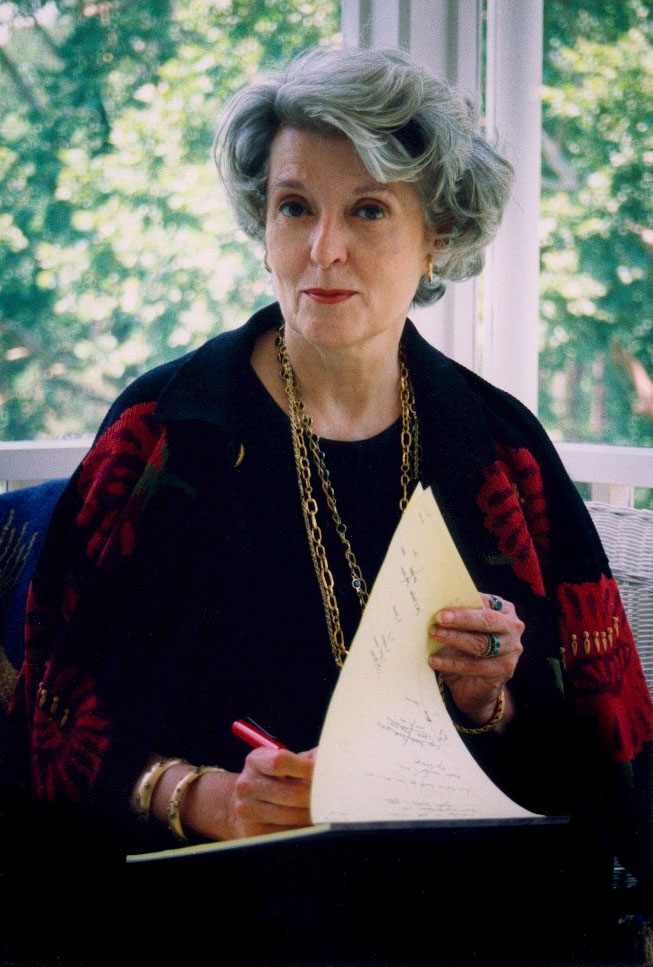
Alexandra Ripley

== Literature and journalism ==
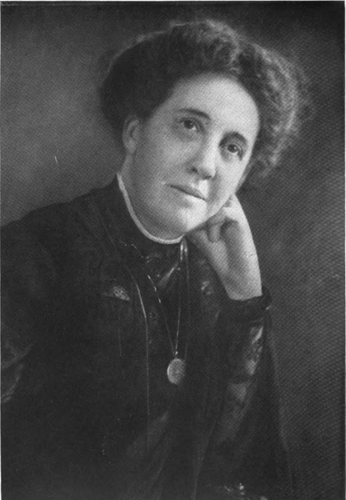
Lily C. Whitaker

- Alexander Aikman (1755–1836), publisher, King's Printer, and House of Assembly member
- Louisa Wells Aikman (1755–1831), 18th-century author
- Essie B. Cheesborough (1826–1905), writer
- Joel Derfner (born 1973), writer
- Nikki DuBose (born 1985), former model turned author and activist
- Frank Bunker Gilbreth Jr. (1911–2001), author, Cheaper by the Dozen
- Caroline Howard Jervey (1823–1877), author, poet
- Robert Jordan (1948–2007), novelist, author of The Wheel of Time series
- Alexandra Ripley (1934–2004), author, Scarlett
- Eden Royce, gothic horror writer
- William Gilmore Simms (1806–1870), poet, novelist, and historian
- Frank Lebby Stanton (1857–1927), lyricist; columnist for the Atlanta Constitution; author of the lyrics of "Just Awearyin' for You"
- Elizabeth Timothy (1702–1757), first female newspaper publisher in America
- Norb Vonnegut (born 1958), author
- Lily C. Whitaker (1850–1932), educator, writer
- Eliza Yonge Wilkinson (1757–?), letter-writer and patriot during the American Revolutionary War

== Military figures ==
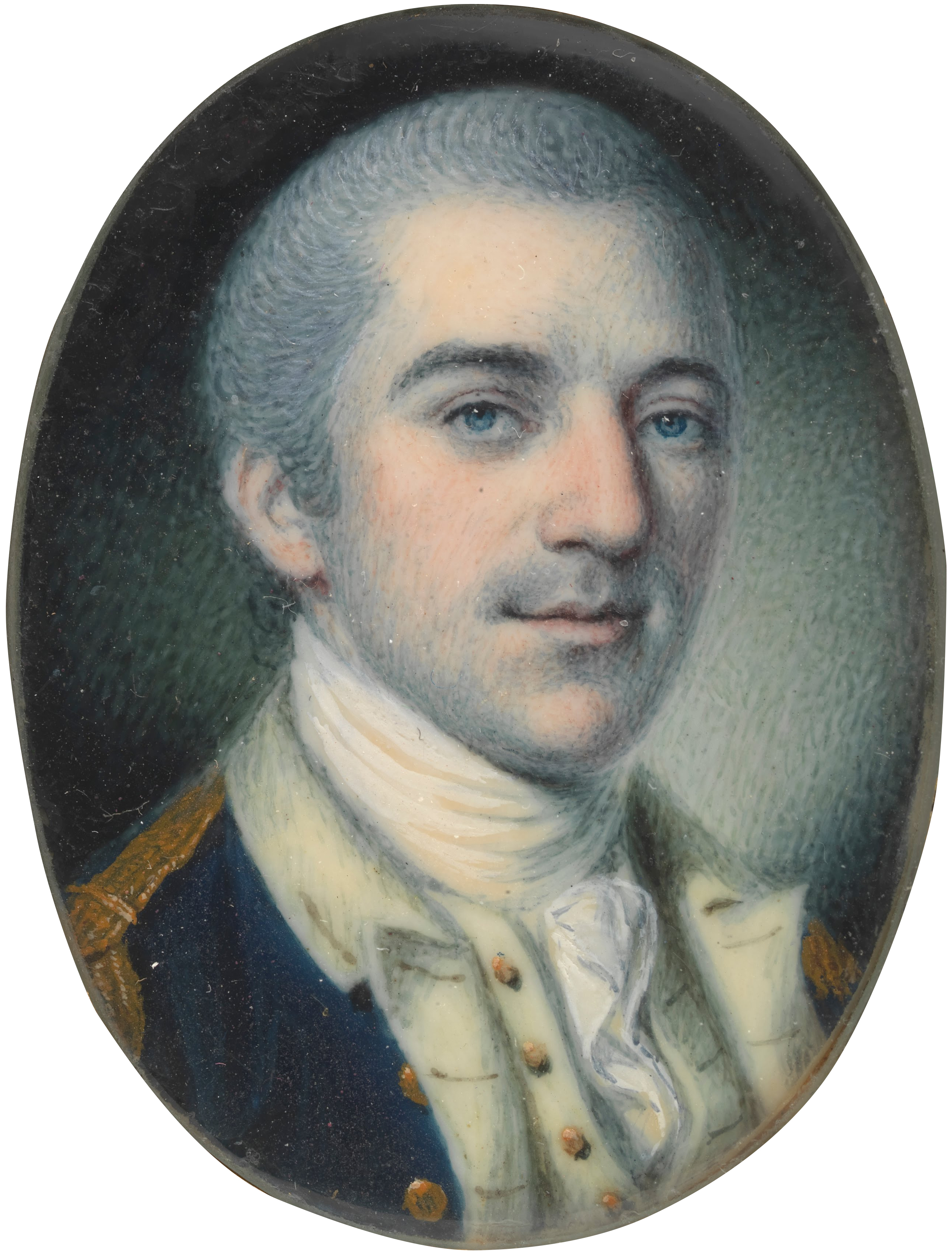
John Laurens

- Arthur L. Bristol (1886–1942), United States Navy vice admiral
- Mark Wayne Clark (1896–1984), United States Army general; supreme commander of the United Nations Command
- James H. Conyers (1855–1935), first Black person admitted to the United States Naval Academy
- Frank L. Culbertson Jr. (born 1949), former naval officer and aviator, test pilot, aerospace engineer, and NASA astronaut
- Percival Drayton (1812–1865), United States Navy officer, commanded Union Naval forces during the Civil War
- Thomas Drayton (1809–1891), Confederate States Army general, brother of Percival Drayton
- Samuel Wragg Ferguson (1834–1917), Confederate States Army general
- James L. Holloway III (1922–2019), United States Navy admiral and navy aviator
- Benjamin Huger (1805–1877), Confederate States Army general
- Ralph H. Johnson (1949–1968), United States Marine who posthumously received the Medal of Honor
- John Laurens (1754–1782), soldier and statesman from South Carolina during the American Revolutionary War
- Stephen Dill Lee (1833–1908), Confederate States Army general; 1st president of Mississippi State University
- Barnwell R. Legge (1891–1949), United States Army general during World War II
- Francis L. Parker (1873–1966), US Army brigadier general, retired in Charleston
- Robert Charlwood Richardson Jr. (1882–1954), United States Army general
- William Childs Westmoreland (1914–2005), United States Army general; 25th chief of staff of the United States Army

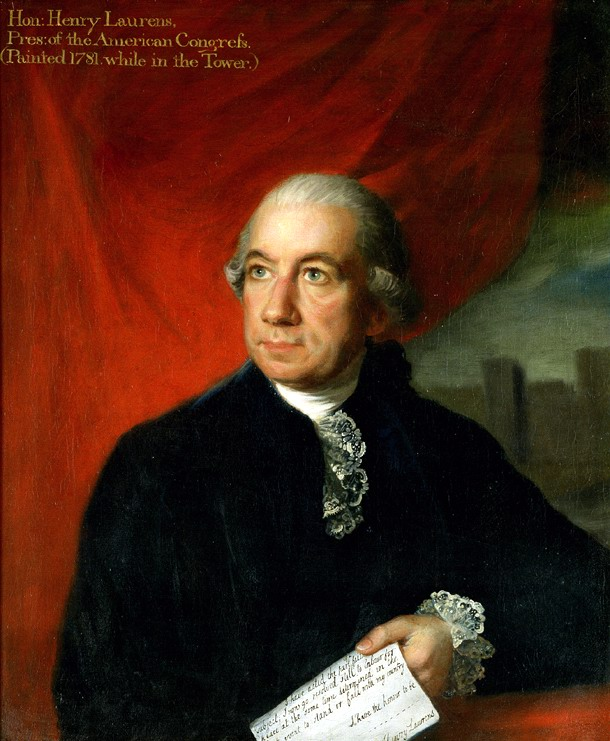
Henry Laurens

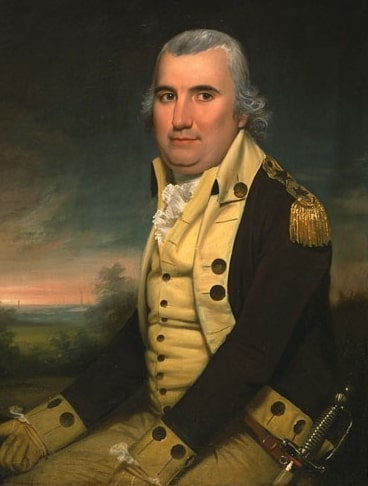
Charles Pinckney

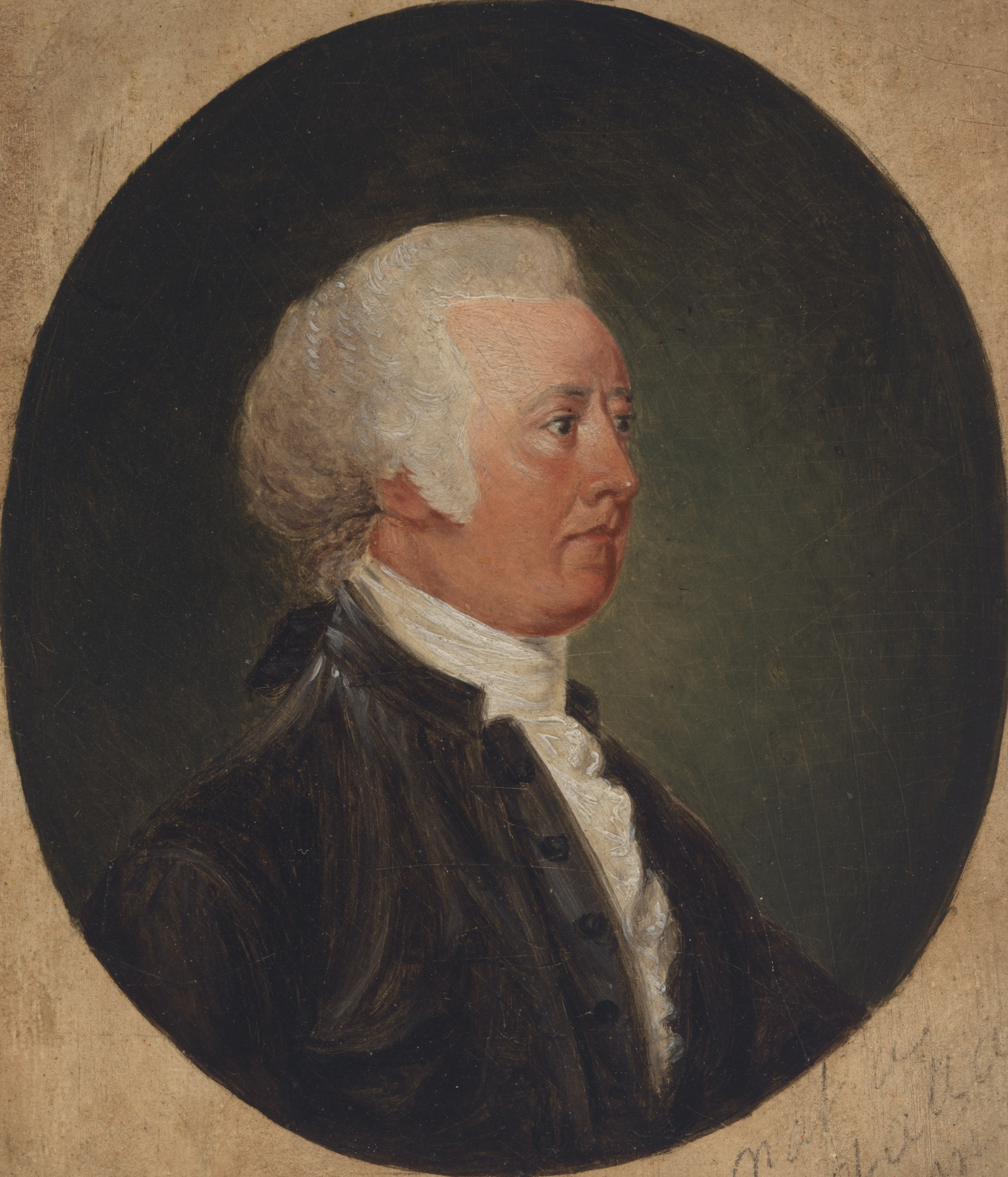
John Rutledge

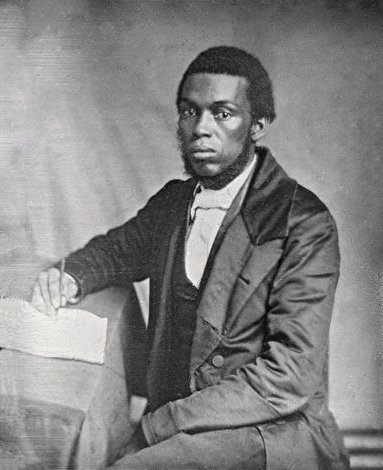
James Smith

== Politics ==
- William Aiken Jr. (1806–1887), governor of South Carolina
- James Edwin Belser, former U.S. congressman for the 2nd District of Alabama
- Judah P. Benjamin (1811–1884), U.S. senator from Louisiana, Confederate States secretary of state and attorney general
- Don C. Bowen (b. 1945), represented District 8 at the South Carolina House of Representatives, 2007–2014
- James Francis Byrnes (1879–1972), U.S. representative and senator, associate justice of the Supreme Court, secretary of state, and governor of South Carolina
- Floride Calhoun (1792–1866), Second Lady of the United States; wife of John C. Calhoun
- John C. Calhoun (1782–1850), U.S. representative and senator, vice president, secretary of state, and secretary of war
- Septima Poinsette Clark (1898–1987), educator, civil rights activist; "grandmother" of the Civil Rights Movement"
- Henry William de Saussure (1763–1839), second director of United States Mint; intendant (mayor) of Charleston
- Christopher Gadsden (1724–1805), Revolutionary War leader
- James Gadsden (1788–1858), U.S. minister to Mexico; president of the South Carolina Railroad Company
- Francois P. Giraud (1818–1877), mayor of San Antonio 1872–1875
- Sarah Moore Grimké (1792–1873), abolitionist, widely held to be the mother of the women's suffrage movement
- Angelina Emily Grimké Weld (1805–1879), abolitionist and political activist
- Edward Harleston (1794–1871), politician
- Henry E. Hayne (1840–d.n.d.), Union Army veteran and Secretary of State of South Carolina
- Robert Young Hayne (1791–1839), mayor of Charleston 1836–1837; United States senator 1823–1833; Governor of South Carolina
- Thomas Heyward Jr. (1746–1809), signer of the Declaration of Independence
- Fritz Hollings (1922–2019), United States senator from South Carolina; governor and lieutenant governor of South Carolina
- Michael Janus (1966–2022), Mississippi state legislator
- James Ladson (1753–1812), revolutionary and lieutenant governor of South Carolina
- Henry Laurens (1724–1792), Revolutionary War leader
- Nancy Mace (born 1977), U.S. congresswoman and state representative
- Samuel Maverick (1803–1870), mayor of San Antonio, signer of the Texas Declaration of Independence, firebrand rancher from whom the term "maverick" was coined
- Burnet Maybank (1899–1954), Charleston mayor 1931–1935; South Carolina governor 1939–1941; United States senator from South Carolina
- Christopher Memminger (1803–1888), signer of the Confederate States Constitution; Confederate States secretary of the treasury 1861–1864
- William Porcher Miles (1822–1899), lawyer; mayor of Charleston 1855–1857; U.S. representative from South Carolina; member of the Confederate Congress; designed the Confederate battle flag
- Thomas E. Miller, one of only five Black congressmen from the South in the Jim Crow era, grandson of Declaration of Independence signer Thomas Heyward Jr.
- Charles Cotesworth Pinckney (1746–1825), Revolutionary War leader; United States ambassador to France; Federalist candidate for president
- Joel Roberts Poinsett (1779–1851), botanist, politician, and diplomat; U.S. representative; United States ambassador to Mexico, secretary of war; founded precursor to the Smithsonian Institution; namesake of the poinsettia
- Alonzo J. Ransier, state senator and U.S. congressman; first African-American lieutenant governor of South Carolina
- Joseph P. Riley Jr. (born 1943), mayor of Charleston 1975–2015
- Edward Rutledge, signed the U.S. Declaration of Independence; governor of South Carolina, 1798–1800
- John Rutledge, president of South Carolina, 1776–1778; commander and chief of South Carolina forces during Revolutionary War; governor of South Carolina, 1779–1782; second chief justice of the U.S. Supreme Court; signed the U.S. Constitution
- James Simons Sr. (1813–1879), lawyer, Confederate militia general, and state legislator
- Benjamin Smith (1717–1770), slave trader, plantation owner, merchant banker, and speaker of the South Carolina House of Assembly 1755–1763
- James Skivring Smith (1825–1884), president of Liberia, 1871–1872
- George Alfred Trenholm (1807–1876), Confederate States secretary of the treasury
- Lucille Whipper (1928–2021), politician and educator, served in the South Carolina House of Representatives from 1986 to 1996
- Joe Wilson (born 1947), U.S. representative for South Carolina
- Bill Workman (1940–2019), Charleston native; mayor of Greenville, 1983–1995; economic development specialist
- Joseph Wragg (1698–1751), pioneer of the large-scale slave trade and member and president of the South Carolina Executive Council

== Other ==
- Ellsworth "Bumpy" Johnson (1905–1968), African American mob boss
- Jacob S. Raisin (1878–1946), rabbi
- Denmark Vesey (1767–1822), freedman tried and executed for allegedly plotting a slave revolt
- Richard Worley, pirate
- Mary Moultrie (1943-2015), nurse's aid and civil rights activist known for her involvement in the 1969 Charleston Hospital Strike
- Mary Fisher (1623-1698), Quaker missionary and preacher born in England
