= Aikman =

Aikman is a surname, and may refer to

- Alexander Aikman (1755–1838), Scottish printer and newspaper publisher in Jamaica
- Charles Morton Aikman FRSE (1861–1902) Scottish agricultural chemist and scientific author
- Chris Aikman (born 1943), Canadian astronomer
- David Aikman (born 1944), journalist
- Frederick Alan Aikman (1919–1991), Canadian fighter pilot
- George Aikman (1830–1905), Scottish painter and engraver
- Gordon Aikman (1985–2017), British ALS researcher and campaigner
- Granville Pearl Aikman (1858–1923), American judge and suffragist
- Laura Aikman (born 1985), an English actress
- Louisa Susannah Aikman (1755–1831), Scottish-American Loyalist and author
- Michael Aikman (politician) (1797–1881), political figure from Upper Canada
- Troy Aikman (b. 1966), American football player
- William Aikman (painter) (1682–1731), Scottish portrait-painter
- William Aikman (writer) (1824–1909), American writer and pastor

Aikman is from the Scottish name for "oak (aik) man". First read in Shakespeare's Macbeth see: http://www.surnamedb.com/surname.aspx?name=Aikman

== See also ==
- Robert Aickman
