= Ackman =

Ackman is a surname. Notable people with the surname include:

- Alyson Ackman (born 1993), Canadian swimmer
- Amy Vera Ackman, also known as Mother Giovanni (1886–1966), Australian hospital administrator
- Bill Ackman (born 1966), American hedge fund manager
- Lawrence D. Ackman (1939–2022), American real estate entrepreneur
- Margaret Ackman, Guyanese politician
- Robert Ackman (1927–2013), Canadian chemistry professor

== See also ==
- Go! Go! Ackman, manga series
- Aikman, surname
