= James MacTear =

Scottish chemist

James MacTear FCS, FIC (3 April 1845 – 3 June 1903) was a Scottish chemical engineer who became a partner and the technical manager of the St Rollox Chemical Works in Glasgow. Mactear was known for inventing a rotating furnace that was used for the continuous manufacturing of sodium sulfate. He influenced the technical development of the chamber process for making sulphuric acid. In 1871, MacTear, created a chemical process to recover sulphur from the alkali waste piles behind the factory at St Rollox. In 1879, MacTear was the first to discover the process to make artificial diamonds. In 1884, MacTear left Glasgow for London becoming a specialist in the metals and metallurgy of mercury and gold.

== Life ==
MacTear's father was Andrew MacTear who was a lithographer, who worked in a business with his brother William at 95 Argyll Street, Glasgow. His father, Andrew MacTear married Martha De Courcy Lewthwaite on 13 June 1844 and had one son, James, and three daughters none of whom survived. MacTear grew up and was educated in Glasgow and as a young man he had a particular fondness towards chemistry. He studied manufacturing chemistry under the tutelage of the Scottish chemist William Wallace, as well as how to manage workmen.

== Career ==
MacTear was initially employed as an assistant manager by Edward Cortis Stanford at the British Seaweed Company, Whitecrook chemical works in Dalmuir, Clydebank. Stanford had invented a process to extract iodine and potash from seaweed that was being introduced to Scotland at the time. MacTear invented a process to extract the bromine which previously had been lost. His next position began in 1864 when he was appointed as an assistant manager, in a chemical factory, C. Allhusen & Sons located in Newcastle upon Tyne, that was owned by Christian Allhusen. In 1867, MacTear became the general manager of the St Rollox Chemical Works in Springburn, Glasgow. MacTear made a number of improvements at St Rollox Chemical Works including inventing a new process to recover sulphur from the waste soda ash piles behind the factory. Within two years, MacTear was promoted to partner at the plant. MacTear remained at the company until 1884 when he retired from the company and moved to London.

In London, MacTear established himself by training in mining and metallurgy with a specialism in mining and metallurgy of quicksilver. As part of the training, he visited nearly all the countries in which the metal had been discovered and used the experience to invent new processes to distil and condense the metal. He also invented a number of processes for the processing of gold.

== Volunteer rifles company ==
An invasion scare in 1859 led to the emergence of the Volunteer Movement, and a Rifle Volunteer Corps (RVCs) composed of part-time soldiers eager to supplement the Regular British Army in time of need, began to be organised throughout Great Britain. In Glasgow, the 5th Lanarkshire Rifle Volunteer Corps was formed on 5 December 1859. MacTear became the commanding officer of the unit between 22 June 1881 and 27 February 1886 with the rank of Lieutenant colonel.

== Awards and honors ==
In 1876, MacTear was awarded the silver medal of the Society of Arts for the invention of new methods into alkali manufacture.

== Bibliography ==
=== Address ===
- Mactear, James (1879). On the antiquity of the chemical art. Londres. OCLC 763913647.

=== Articles ===
- MacTear, James (1872). "Technical chemistry, Notes on the loss of soda in Leblanc's process". Journal of the Chemical Society. 25: 335. doi:10.1039/JS8722500335.
- MacTear, James (12 January 1877). Crookes, William; Gardiner, James H.; Druce, Gerald (eds.). "On the growth of the alkali and bleaching powder manufacture of the Glasgow district". Chemical News and Journal of Physical Science. XXXV. Chemical news office.
- Mactear, James (1878). "LVII.—On the part played by carbon in reducing the sulphates of the alkalis". J. Chem. Soc., Trans. 33: 475–487. doi:10.1039/CT8783300475.
- MacTear, James (17 May 1878). "Some Recent Improvements in the Process Connected with Alkali Manufacture". Journal of the Royal Society of Arts: 553.
- MacTear, James (1895). "Some Notes on Persian Mining and Metallurgy". Transactions of the Institution of Mining and Metallurgy. London: E. & F.N. Spon, Limited; The Institution. p. 2.
- MacTear, James (1895). "A Description of Dry Blowing". Transactions of the Institution of Mining and Metallurgy. London: E. & F.N. Spon, Limited; The Institution. p. 331.
- Mactear, James (1895). Mining and Metallurgy of Quicksilver in Mexico. Abstract of proceedings - Institution of Mining and Metallurgy. Institution of Mining and Metallurgy.
- MacTear, James (1897). "Improvements in the Extraction of Precious Metals From Ores or From Compounds Containing The Same". Papers and Reports Relating to Minerals and Mining. Wellington: New Zealand Mines Department. p. 190.
