= Dereef =

Dereef or DeReef is a surname. Notable people with the surname include:

- George Heriot DeReef (1869–1937), American lawyer and civil rights leader
- Richard Edward Dereef (c. 1798–1876), American enslaver, lumber trader and politician
