= Charles Morton Aikman =

Scottish agricultural chemist

Charles Morton Aikman FRSE FIC FCS (10 May 1861 – 14 November 1902) was a 19th century Scottish agricultural chemist and scientific author.

== Life ==
He was born on 10 May 1861, the son of Glasgow merchant and shipping agent Thomson Aikman (1817-1893) and his wife Janet Morton (1815-1857). They lived at Hamilton Crescent in Partick.

He studied Sciences at Glasgow University specialising in Organic Chemistry. He graduated MA in 1883, gaining a further BSc in 1885 and a doctorate (DSc) in 1894.

In 1888 he was elected a Fellow of the Royal Society of Edinburgh. His proposers were Andrew Peebles Aitken, James Burgess Readman, William Dittmar and Thomas A. G. Balfour. At this stage he was living at Middlefield House in Partickhill.

In 1891 he began lecturing in Chemistry at Glasgow University. In 1893 (aged only 32) he was created Professor of Chemistry at Glasgow Veterinary College.

In 1900 his address was given as 21 Snowdon Place in Stirling.

He died on 14 November 1902 and is memorialised on the family stone in the Glasgow Necropolis.

== Publications ==
- Potash Manuring
- The Food of Crops and How to Apply It
- Manures and the Principles of Manuring (1894)
- Milk its Nature and Composition (1895)
- The Book of the Dairy
- Farmyard Manure: Its Nature, Composition and Treatment
