= St Rollox Chemical Works =

Glasgow chemical works

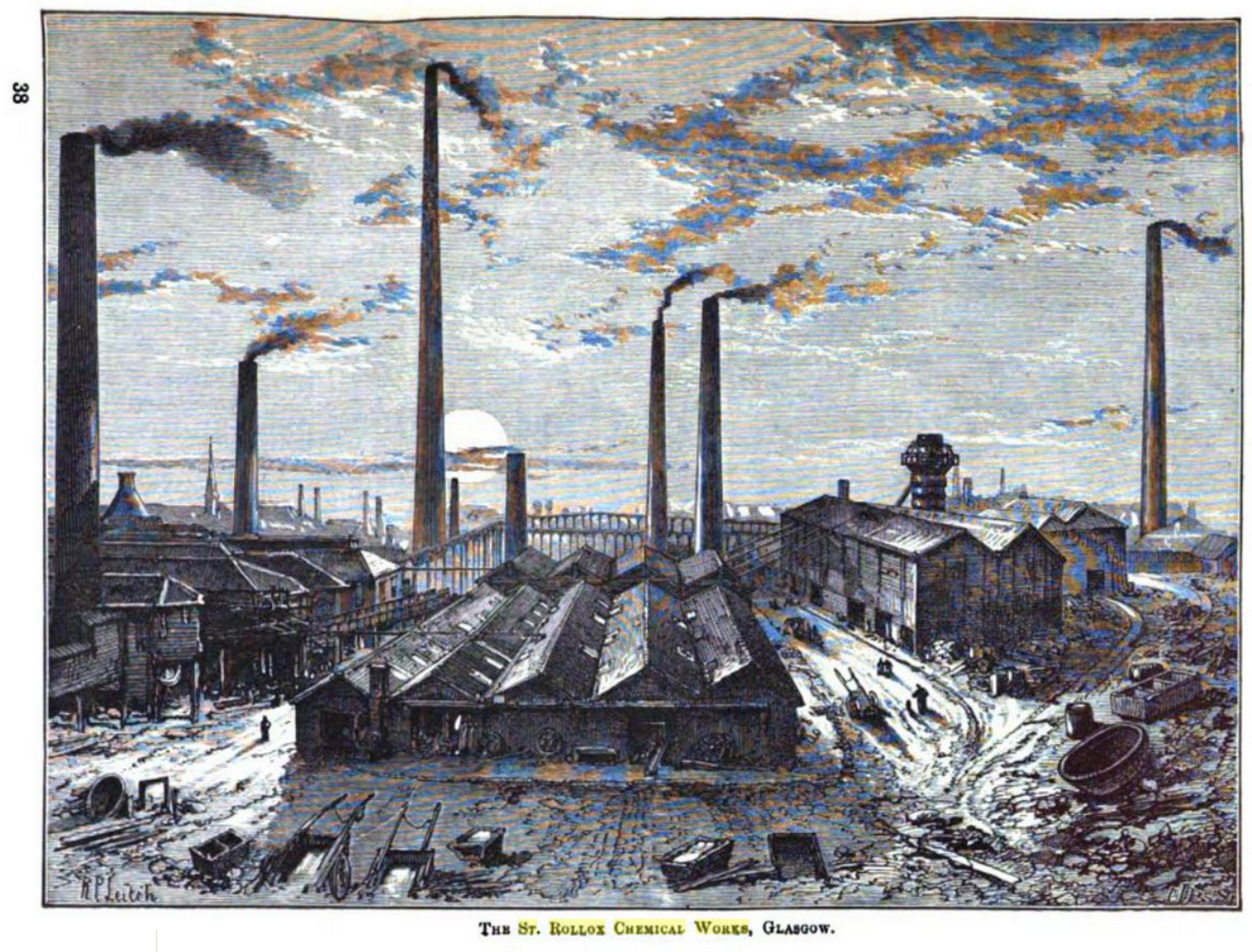
- St Rollox Chemical Works 1884

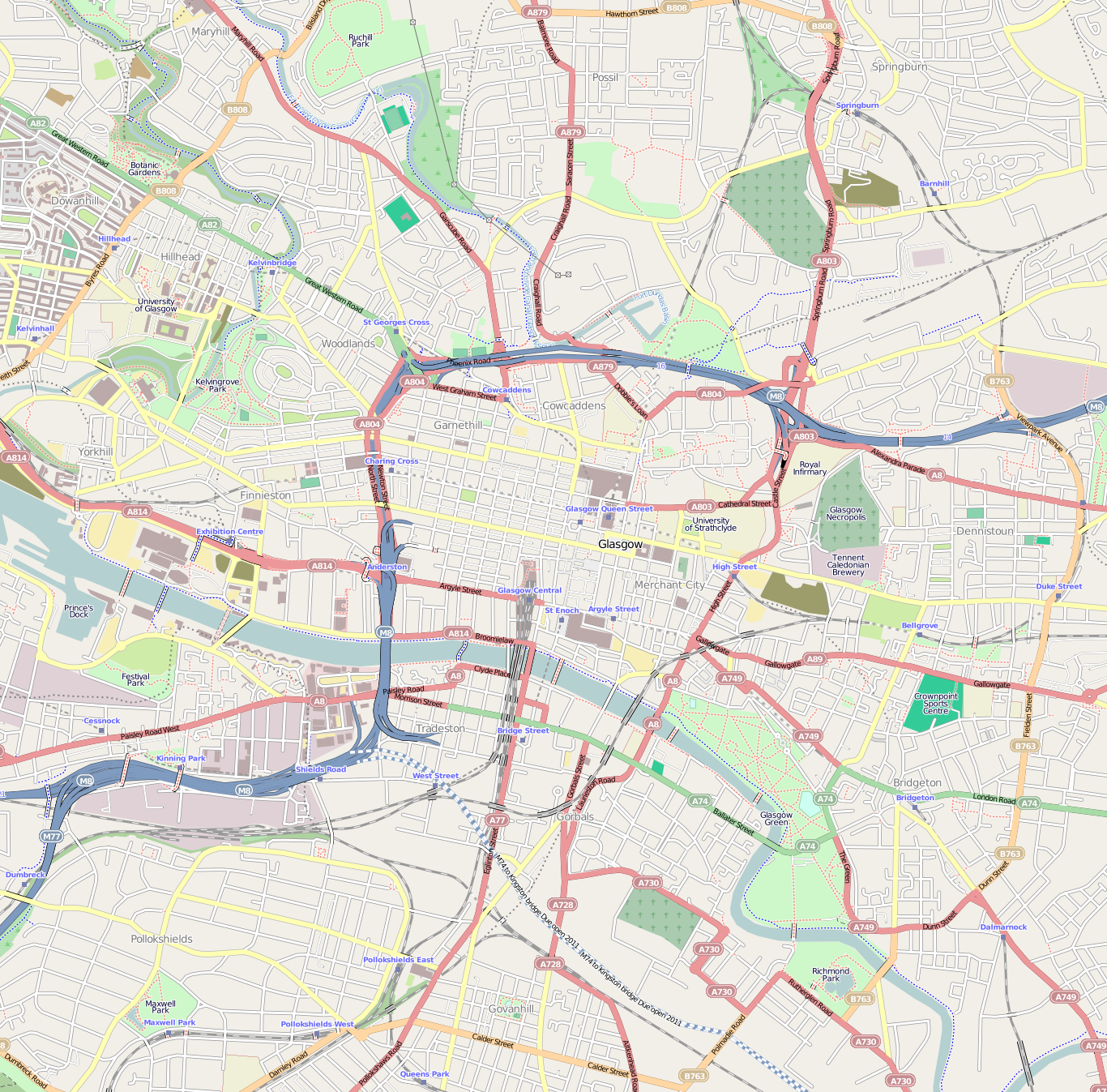
- St Rollox Chemical Works
- Built: 1797
- Location: 229-231 Castle Street, Glasgow
- Coordinates: 55.8735°N 4.2324°W
- Industry: Chemical industry
- Products: Bleach, sulfuric acid, soap, sodium carbonate, sulfur, manganese
- Area: 130 acres (53 ha)
- Owner: Charles Tennant
- Defunct: 1964

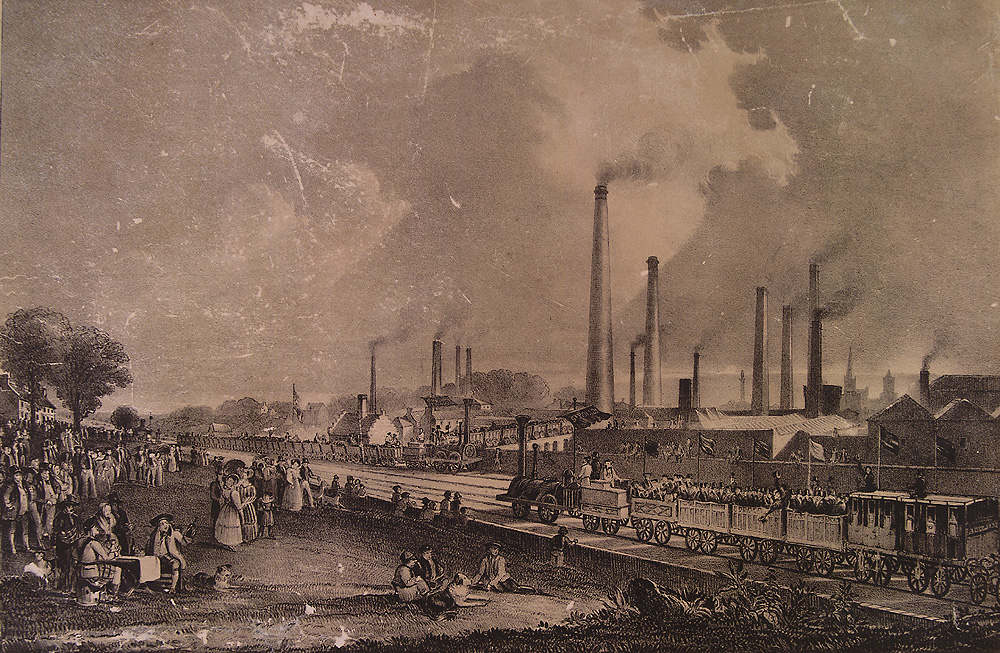
Photograph of a painting of St Rollox chemical works at the opening of the Garnkirk and Glasgow Railway in 1831

St Rollox Chemical Works was an industrial manufacturer of chemicals located in Glasgow, Scotland, that began in 1799 and stood until 1964. It was created by Scottish industrialist Charles Tennant and owned and operated by his family and descendants. It was described as the largest plant in Europe, if not the world.

== Formation ==
In 1787, Tennant attended a demonstration of Claude Louis Berthollet's chlorine bleaching process that was held by Watt in Birmingham. Tennant adapted the bleaching process by substituting lime for potash, solving the problem of lime's inability to form a solution in water and opening the way to produce bleach. He received a patent No. 2209 on 23 January 1798 for the manufacture of a bleaching liquor by passing chlorine into a well-agitated mixture of lime and water.

The new process reduced both the cost of the bleaching liquor and the damage caused by the liquor to the cloth. The new liquid had a short shelf life, so Tennant and Macintosh licensed their process and toured Lancashire manufacturers to sell the process for £200 each. In the beginning, the scheme worked relatively well, with each bleach manufacturer reporting that they were saving between £1000-£2500 per year. As the process became more widely known, Lancashire manufacturers used it without obtaining a licence from Tennant. He sued for infringement of patent rights but lost in court. Tennant took the case to the Crown Court in 1802 but lost again. In the intervening period, he came up with a new process, that was granted a patent No. 2312 on 30 April 1799 for a new bleaching powder (calcium hypochlorite). Tennant decided to open a new factory to commercially develop the product.

In 1799, Tennant, with three business partners, created the legal entity. The first of these, William Couper, was the legal advisor to the partnership. The second partner was Alexander Dunlop (his brother married Charles's eldest daughter), who served as accountant to the group. The third partner, James Knox, managed the sales department. The chemist Charles Macintosh was the fourth partner. The new factory was at St Rollox in North Glasgow, close to the Monkland Canal that enabled it to transport coal and ironstone from the coal mines in Lanarkshire.

In October 1838, Charles Tennant died and his son John Tennant (1796–1878) became general manager of the company. In 1890, the general decline of the company caused by the transfer to the Solvay process which was externally patented, led the company to merge with many other chemical manufacturers in the UK to form the United Alkali Company but it continued to trade as Charles Tennant & Co. In 1913 the company was incorporated as Charles Tennant & Co Ltd.

== Operation ==
St Rollox was started as a chlorine bleaching manufacturer that used the Claude Louis Berthollet potash-chlorine bleaching liquor and then chemically modified by substituting the potash with lime to produce a bleach. In 1799, the process changed when the company moved to the Macintosh-Tennant process to produce dry bleaching powder

The powder was made from chlorine and slaked lime and became known as Tennant's bleaching salt. It was produced by mixing 4 parts of water, 4 1/2 parts salt, 2 parts of manganese and 4 parts of sulfuric acid known as "vitriol" in a lead vessel heated in a water bath. The powder sold well and this enabled the factory to expand and diversify. At the time, sulfuric acid cost £60 per ton and large quantities were needed in the production of chlorine, so Tennant started producing it. By 1802, the factory was producing 252,270 lb (114,430 kg) of vitriol per year and selling 151,117 lb (68,546 kg) of bleaching powder per year, valued at £7500.

In 1803, St Rollox had installed six lead vessels to produce the bleach, measuring 10 ft × 12 ft (3.0 m × 3.7 m) by 10 ft (3.0 m) high In 1803, the house that contained the vessels was of three floors about 50 ft (15 m) long by 24 ft (7.3 m). The upper floor contained the vessels, the floor below the glass retorts for concentrating acid and the bottom floor contained the lead evaporating boilers used to bring the acid up to strength for the glass retorts. In 1807, eight more were added. By 1809, production capacity had been increased further, with 26 vessels in total. This was further increased by six in 1811, taking the total number to 32 and were much larger, measuring 60 ft × 14 ft × 12 ft (18.3 m × 4.3 m × 3.7 m) high, arranged in sets of two or three. The chambers were constructed to use external furnaces that burned the sulfur and supplied gas by use of a flue. These were supplied by Bealy and Radcliffe of Manchester.

In 1825, when the salt tax was removed, the factory moved to producing crystal and ash soda using the Leblanc process. The process to create alkalis was to add sulfuric acid to salt that produced sodium sulfate, known as saltcake. The cake was roasted in a vessel by furnace and lime and coal to produce sodium carbonate (soda ash) that was immersed in water for 12 hours. The resultant liquid was put into lead pans to evaporate. This enabled the factory to expand further with the use of platina lined vats to hold the vitriol concentrates instead of the less efficient lead lined ones, more furnaces, more warehouses and storage space as well as building a canal basin and a railway terminal. By the 1850s, further expansion had added a cooperage and an iron foundry to make and repair their own equipment.

By the early 1860s, the factory was producing 8000 tons of bleaching powder, 20,000 imp gal (91,000 L; 24,000 US gal) of sulfuric acid, 10,000 tons of soda ash and 8000 tons of soda crystals along with hundreds of tons of soap per year. In the 1870s the factory changed from the Leblanc process to the newer Solvay process.

After 1892, the company ceased producing soda-based products and from that point on only produced sulfuric acid.

== Pollution ==
By the 1820s, the management of St Rollox were receiving complaints due to the pollution produced by the factory. A cloud of acrid yellow smoke hung over the factory day and night. In 1822 during an enquiry into the pollution, a lawyer for one of the complainers stated "The smell of the works is at all times very offensive when the wind is north and makes her sick and inclined to vomit...Whenever the wind is in the north it pours down upon her. She considers this wholly arises from the manufacture of vitriol – and if Mr Tennant would give that up, she would let him carry on the other thing as he pleased". Another resident in the area stated of planting of hedges in the area: "During the present season several thousand of seedling beeches along with six thousand seedling thorns have been entirely destroyed".

Twenty years later, a cartoon in a local magazine had the caption "St Rollox . . . a Clear Day" showed nothing but the liquid blackness of black ink covering the area.

=== Tennant's Stalk ===
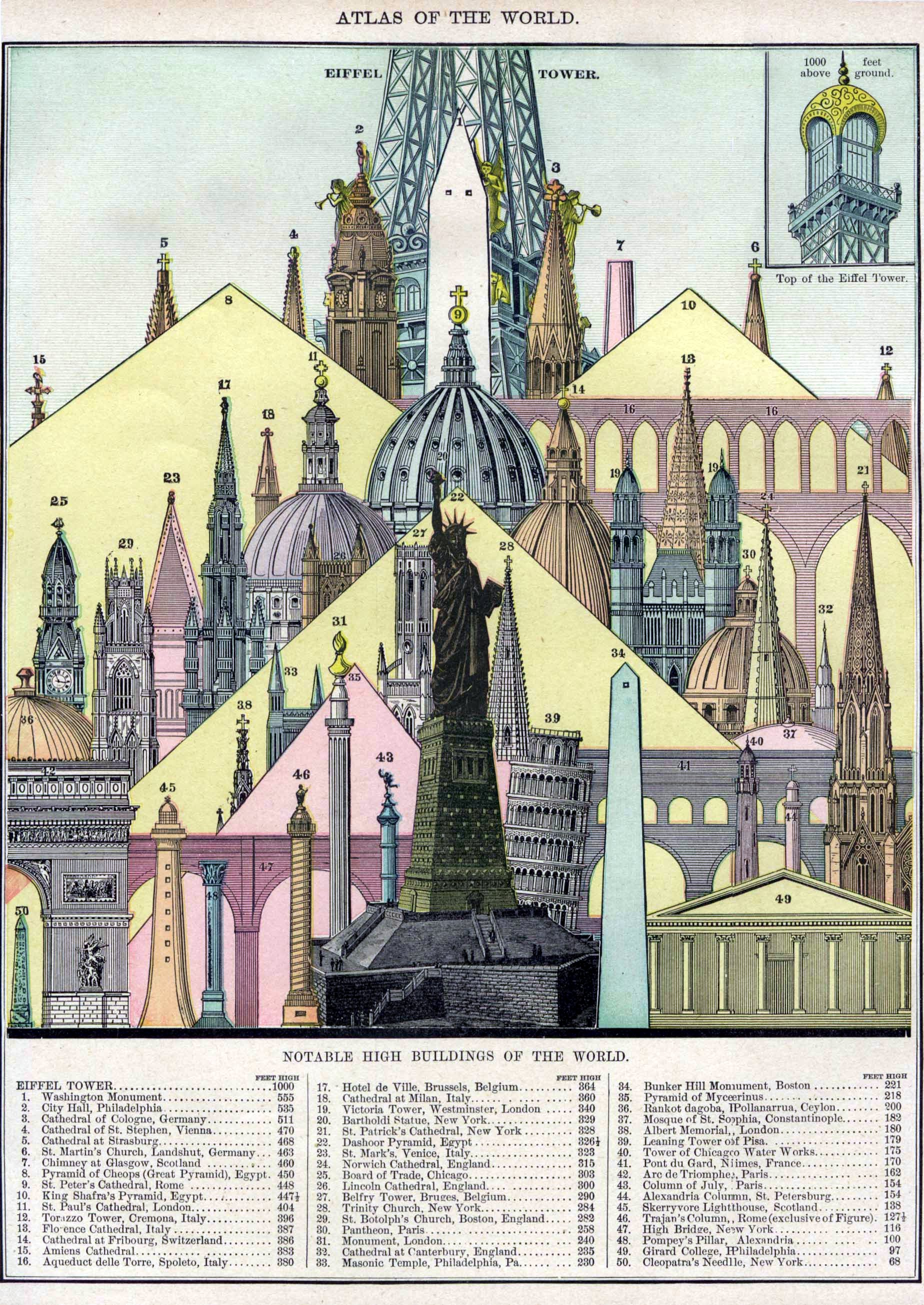
Tennants Stalk chimney on the list of tallest buildings in 1896. The chimney is listed at number 7.

When John Tennant became head of the plant in 1838, the problem of pollution in the form of noxious fumes was foremost in his mind, due to the continual complaints of tainted air from people living in the area. At the time there were several high chimneys at St Rollox to lift the fumes high over the bog country behind the factory, yet people still complained. While in church one Sunday he had the idea of building an exceptionally tall chimney that would take the fumes higher.

The chimney was projected (Note: A set of drawings to scale were created.) by the Scottish engineer William Rankine, designed by the Scottish civil engineers Lewis Gordon and L. Hill. The civil engineer for the project was Andrew Thomson. The main contractor on the project was the bricklayer Dugald Campbell McIntyre who was the main bricklayer at St Rollox. McIntyre was initially hesitant, thinking the proposition was a joke, but eventually provided an estimate of works which was accepted.

On 29 June 1841, work began on the chimney. Concrete foundations were laid at a depth of 20 feet into the bed of sandstone underlying the area. When completed the chimney measured 455.5 feet (138.8 m) tall.

=== Waste alkali removal ===
For more than 50 years the waste piles behind the factory had been accumulating on an old peat bog that lay within a natural basin of sandstone. The compounds in the waste were lixiviated by rainfall and water from numerous springs in the area enabling a flow to be created out of the bog, described as a "yellow liquor" which consisted of a complex sulfide of calcium. The yellow liquor was allowed to flow into Pinkston Burn then into the River Kelvin which eventually reached the River Clyde. The smell coming from the yellow liquor caused a significant nuisance and an attempt was made to sink shafts into the sandstone basin with several galleries at that depth running to 300 yards in an attempt to drain the water before it reached the waste piles. In 1865, a report was prepared by the University of Glasgow chemist Thomas Anderson. which added pressure to address the pollution problem.

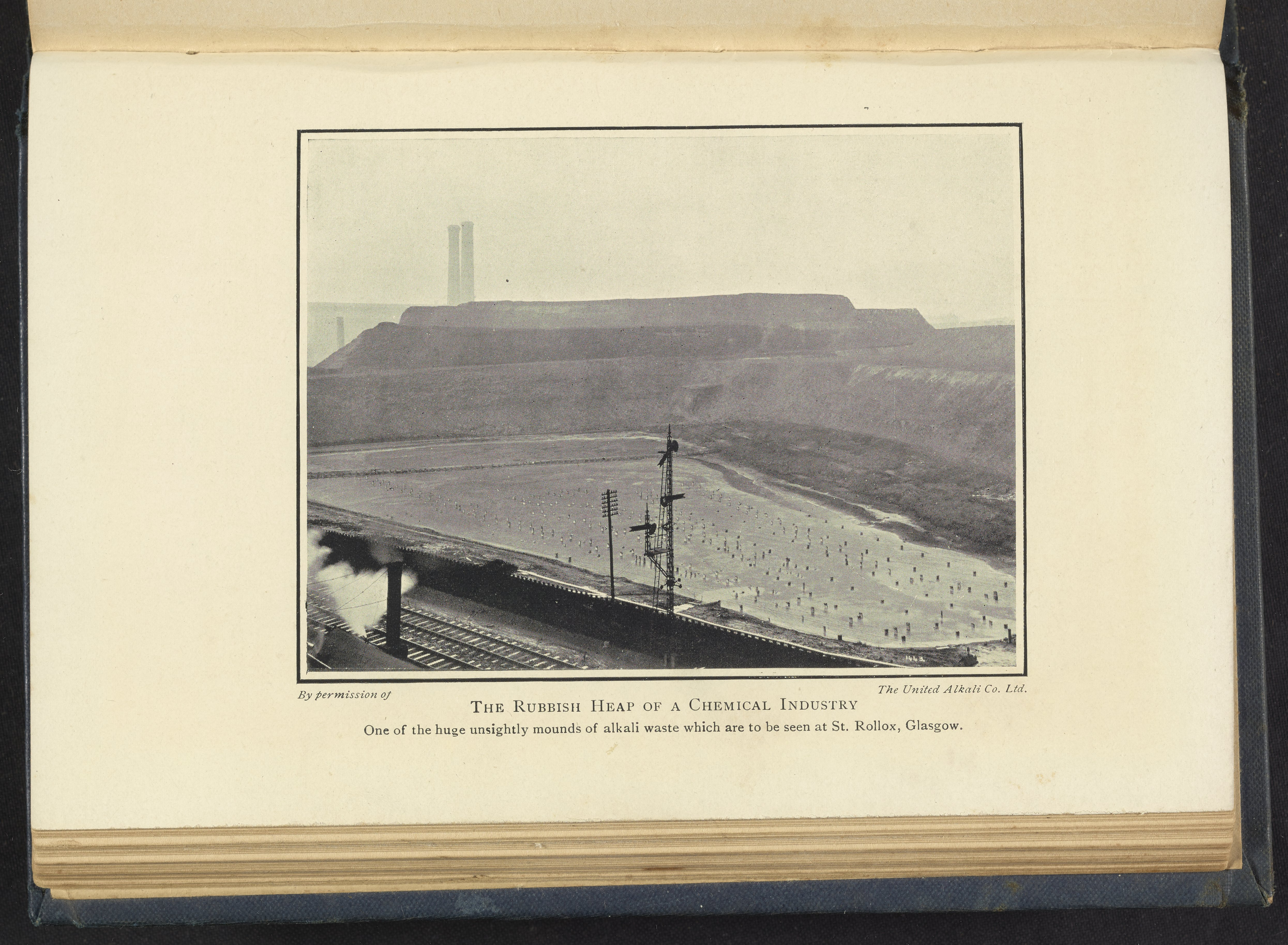
Waste piles shown in 1909. The lixiviated waste pool is visible behind the railway

In 1871, James MacTear, who was the manager at St Rollox, created a chemical process to recover sulfur from the waste piles behind the factory. It involved pumping the waste yellow liquor from the soda heaps into a special vessel, treating it with sulfurous acid to form an oxide, that was then dissolved with water, then hot hydrochloric acid was used to precipitate the sulfur, which was dried and fused. The process was reliable, resulting in a product that was cheap to produce and was widely used by manufacturers, even though it recovered only 27% to 30% of the available sulfur. One ton of sulfur could be recovered at a cost of 61 shillings at a cost of £2000 for an apparatus, that could produce 35 tons per week and plant itself could produce 100 tons per month. The sulfur was of excellent purity and was generally used to make gunpowder.

== Closure and destruction ==
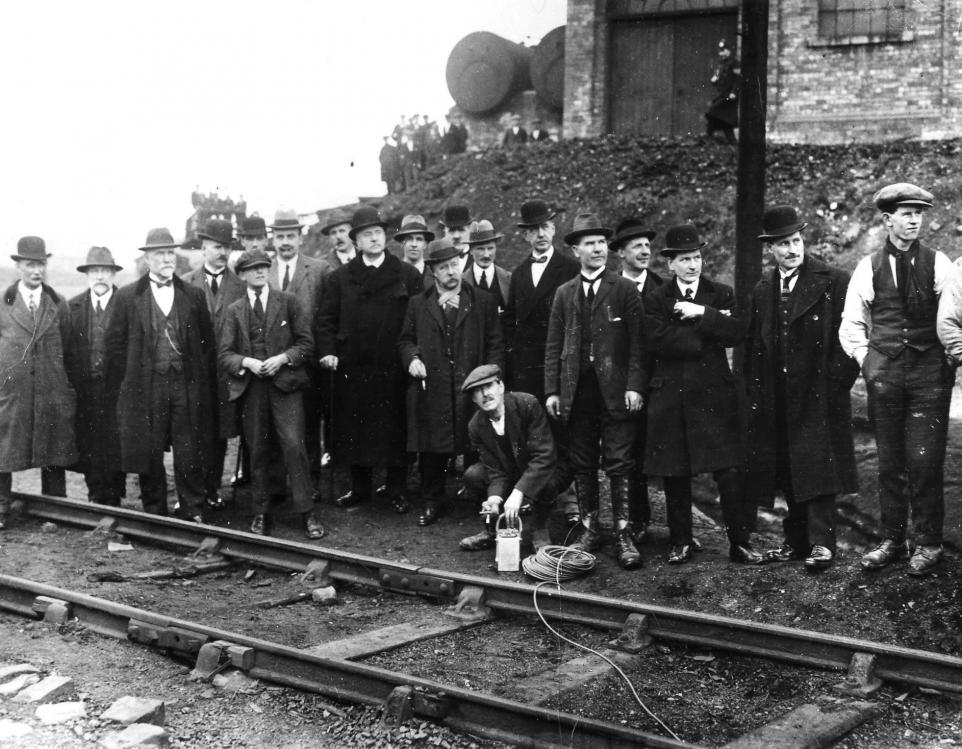
Workers at St Rollox about to blow up Tennants Stalk

During its operational lifetime, Tennants Stalk had been reduced in height to 90 feet. In 1922, the chimney was struck by lightning and a bulge appeared on the side of it, so it was decided to demolish it. Eight workers were employed to reduce the height of the chimney by removing bricks from the top when the chimney suddenly collapsed, killing four of the workers and it was decided to dynamite the remains.

In the early 1960s the factory was closed as it was no longer economically viable. It was demolished in 1964.

== See also ==
- Glasgow Works

== Bibliography ==
- Alison, Robert (1892). "The Tennants of St. Rollox". The anecdotage of Glasgow. Glasgow: Thomas D. Morrison.
- Anderson, Thomas (August 1865). Report on the refuse matters of the St. Rollox works, and their effect on the water of the River Clyde (Report). Glasgow: R Anderson, University of Glasgow.
- Bancroft, Robert M.; Bancroft, Francis J. (1885). Tall chimney construction. A practical treatise on the construction of tall chimney shafts ... constructed in brick, stone, iron and concrete. Manchester: J. Calvert. p. 38.
- Bertram, James G (1884). "Model Establishments - V. The St Rollox Chemical Works, Glasgow". Great industries of Great Britain. Vol. 1. London: Cassell, Petter, Galpin and Company. pp. 296–300. This article incorporates text from this source, which is in the public domain.
- Chisholm, Hugh, ed. (1911). "Tennant, Charles" . Encyclopædia Britannica. Vol. 26 (11th ed.). Cambridge University Press.
- Crathorne, Nancy (1973). Tennants Stalk The story of the Tennants of the Glen. London: MacMillan, The Nancy Crathorne Memorial Trust.
- Devine, Thomas Martin; Jackson, Gordon; Fraser, W. Hamish; Maver, Irene (1995). Glasgow: 1830 to 1912. Manchester: Manchester University Press. ISBN 978-0-7190-3692-7.
- Christie, John R.R. (2018). "Chemical Glasgow and its Entrepreneurs, 1760-1860". In Roberts, Lissa; Werrett, Simon (eds.). Compound Histories Materials, Governance and Production, 1760-1840. Cultural Dynamics of Science. Vol. 2. London: 978-90-04-32549-4. pp. 311–332. doi:10.1163/9789004325562_015. ISBN 9789004325562.
- Chang, Hasok; Jackson, Catherine (2007). An element of controversy: the life of chlorine in science, medicine, technology and war. London: British society for the history of science. pp. 168–174. ISBN 978-0-906450-01-7.
- Harden, Arthur (1898). "Tennant, Charles". In Stephen, Leslie; Lee, Sidney (eds.). Dictionary of National Biography Teach to Tollet. Vol. 56. London: Smith, Elder and Co.
- Hume, John R. (1966). "The St Rollox Chemical Works 1799-1964". Industrial Archaeology. 3. Exeter: David & Charles: 185–190.
- Hutchinson, Martin (1 January 2023). Forging Modernity. Cambridge, uk: Lutterworth Press. ISBN 978-0-7188-9686-7.
- Kutney, Gerald (7 February 2023). Sulfur: History, Technology, Applications and Industry (3rd ed.). Toronto: Elsevier. ISBN 978-1-77467-027-9.
- Jack, Ian (11 February 2021). "The Stinky Ocean". Granta. Vol. 154. London: Sigrid Rausing.
- Macintosh, George (1847). Biographical Memoir of the Late Charles Macintosh ... Glasgow: W.G. Blackie & Company.
- MacTear, James (12 January 1877). Crookes, William; Gardiner, James H.; Druce, Gerald; Ryan, H. W. Blood (eds.). "On the growth of the alkali and bleaching powder manufacture of the Glasgow district". Chemical News and Journal of Physical Science. XXXV. Chemical news office. This article incorporates text from this source, which is in the public domain.
- MacTear, James (17 May 1878). "Some Recent Improvements in the Process Connected with Alkali Manufacture". Journal of the Royal Society of Arts. This article incorporates text from this source, which is in the public domain.
- Reed, Peter (23 March 2016). Acid Rain and the Rise of the Environmental Chemist in Nineteenth-Century Britain: The Life and Work of Robert Angus Smith. Science, technology, and culture, 1700-1945 (1st ed.). London: Routledge. ISBN 978-1-317-18582-6.
- Smith, Ken (18 April 2017). "An explosive end to a Glasgow landmarkAn explosive end to a Glasgow landmark". Herald & Times Group. The Herlad.
- Timmins, Geoffrey (15 December 1998). Made in Lancashire: A History of Regional Industrialisation. Manchester: Manchester University Press. ISBN 978-0-7190-4539-4.
- "XIII Lift for patents and inventions". The Repertory of Arts, Manufactures, and Agriculture: Consisting of Original Communications, Specifications of Patent Inventions, Practical and Interesting Papers, Selected from the Philosophical Transactions and Scientific Journals of All Nations ... Vol. XI. London: John Nichols. 1799.
- "The World; A Scotch Chimney Four Hundred and Fifty Feet in Height". The New York Times. 8 September 1895.
