= Alexander Aikman =

- Born: 23 June 1755; Bo'ness, County of Linlithgow, Scotland
- Died: 6 July 1838 (aged 83); British Colony of Jamaica
- Occupations: Printer and newspaper publisher
- Years active: 1791–1807

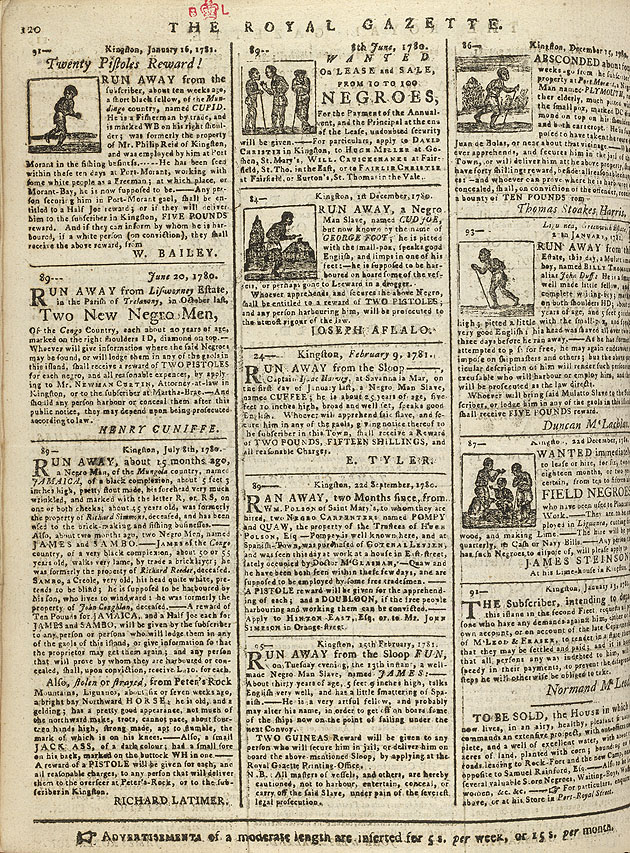
Page from The Royal Gazette, 19 May 1781, featuring notices of escaped slaves.

Alexander Aikman (23 June 1755 – 6 July 1838) was a Scottish printer, newspaper publisher, planter, and member of Jamaica's House of Assembly. From 1805 to 1825, he was a member of the House of Assembly as the representative of Saint George parish.

== Early life ==
He was born on 23 June 1755 at Barrowstounness (Bo'ness), County of Linlithgow (now part of Falkirk Council), Scotland. His parents Andrew Aikman (1723–1785) and Ann Hunter (1730–1759). Ann was the only child of William Hunter and Margaret Aynsley.

His older brother was William Aikman (1751–1784). William immigrated to the British Colony of Jamaica in 1775. There, he became involved in the printing business with David Douglass. William died childless at the age of 33.

His older sister was Marion Aikman (1753– ). Marion married Alexander Henderson in 1782 and raised their family in Scotland.

After his mother passed, his father married Janet Nimmo in 1766. Together they had three sons: (John, Andrew, and James) and two daughters (Janet and Mary), all of whom remained in Scotland.

In 1771, at the age of sixteen, Alexander left Scotland for British South Carolina, He settled in Charleston and apprenticed himself to Robert Wells (1728–1794), a Loyalist and fellow Scotsman.

In British America, Robert Wells was a major book-trading, printer, and newspaper publisher. By 1764, Wells ran his own newspaper, the South Carolina and American General Gazette. By 1775, Wells claimed to have the largest stock of books for sale in America. While in Charleston, Wells wrote and published his version of "Travestie of Virgil." Wells was a “fervent Loyalist." Consequently, at the opening of the American Revolutionary War, Wells left the colonies and relocated to London.

Robert Wells married Mary Rowand. Together, they had six children, including Louisa Susannah Wells, William Charles Wells, and Helena Wells. While apprenticing for Wells, Alexander Aikman clerked alongside Wells’ daughter, Louisa Susannah Wells, for about four years.

== Career ==
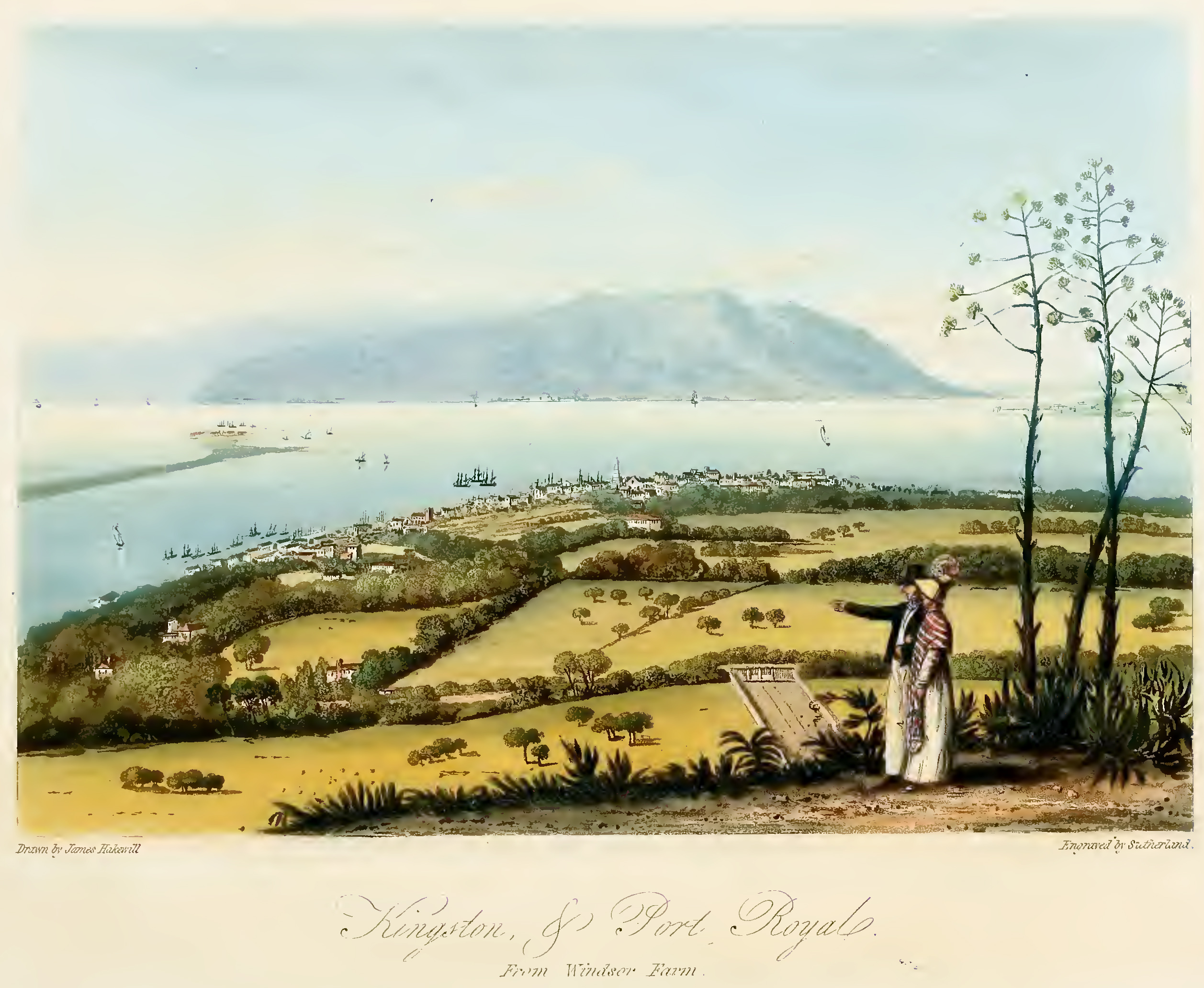
Kingston, & Port Royal. From Windsor Farm by James Hakewill

At the American Revolutionary War, Alexander, in common with several other Loyalists, left British America and immigrated to the British Colony of Jamaica. He arrived in Saint George Parish, about 1777, at the age of 22. Soon after his arrival, he purchased the printing business of Robert Sherlock of Spanish-Town. In 1779 he founded The Jamaica Mercury and Kingston Weekly Advertiser with David Douglass (d. 1786). In 1780 it became The Royal Gazette. It was published weekly in Port Royal Street, but soon afterward in Harbour Street. Alexander's older brother William operated a book and stationery store on King Street.

In 1780 Douglass and Aikman became printers to the House of Assembly and the King's Printer. In addition, they printed "Almanac and Register," "Observations on the Dysentery of the West Indies," "A Brief History of the Late Expedition against Fort San Juan," and other books. After Douglass died in 1786, Alexander Aikman became the printer. In 1803 Alexander Aikman & Son were the printers. In 1809 it was Alexander Aikman Jr. After his son's death in 1831, Alexander, for a short time, resumed his printing and publishing businesses before retiring.

From 1805 to 1825, Alexander represented the old parish of Saint George as a member of British Jamaica's House of Assembly. During that period, he owned three properties, two of which were in Saint George Parish.

Aikman visited England in 1796 to hire a pressman (in which voyage he was taken by a privateer, and had to repurchase his property at Philadelphia). He visited again in 1801, in 1803, and in 1814, but from that time had remained at home.

En route to his 1796 London visit, it appears Alexander experienced another incident. His daughter's gravestone describes surviving a shipwreck off Isle of Wight's coast. Others confirm the passage of a significant storm in the English Channel, which caused significant damage, injuries, and death. From Susannah Aikman's altar tomb (see: Louisa Susanna Wells' page for detail):

In the memorable Storm of Novr. 17th and 18th 1795, she escaped shipwreck, together with her Father, Mother, and infant Sister when above 2000 of their fellow creatures met a watery grave near the back of this Island.

Alexander was a wealthy man. He owned four properties, each of which initially relied on slaves. Those properties were "Birnam Wood" in Saint George (257 enslaved), "Wallenford" in Saint George (58 enslaved), "Prospect Pen" in Saint Andrew (39 enslaved), and his printing office in Kingston (3 enslaved). In 1831, approximately 60,000 of Jamaica's 300,000 slaves initiated a strike, which escalated and became the Baptist War. In 1834, slavery was abolished throughout Jamaica, British West Indies, and the British Empire. In Jamaica, former slaves transitioned to an apprenticeship program, with full freedom in 1838.

Prospect Pen was also known as Prospect Park, which subsequently became Vale Royal. Later, Vale Royal became the official residence of the Colonial Secretary.

== Family ==
He married at Kingston, Jamaica, on 14 January 1782, Louisa Susannah Wells (1755–1831), second daughter of his former master Robert Wells. She joined him from England after no little peril, having twice attempted the voyage: on the first attempt, she was captured by the French, by whom she was detained for three months in France, and on the second by a King's ship, in consequence of taking her passage in a slave vessel. By this lady who died on 29 November 1831 (and of whom a brief memoir will be found in the Gentleman's Magazine vol. CI pt. ii, p. 571), Aikman had two sons and eight daughters. Of their ten children, six died as infants. All six infants are buried near his brother, Andrew, at The Strangers' Burial Ground in Kingston.

His three surviving daughters were Mary Ann (1782–1844), the wife of James Smith of Saint Andrews, Jamaica, Ann Hunter (1788–1841), the widow of John Enright, Surgeon R.N (1795–1817), and Susanna (1791–1818).

His only surviving son and successor in business was Alexander Aikman Jr. (1783–1831). In 1805, Alexander Aikman Jr. married Charlotte Cory (1781–1810). Together, they had two children: Alexander Wells Aikman (1808–1869) and Amelia Ann Aikman (1809–1845). After Charlotte's passing, Alexander's two children were raised by his mother, Louisa Susannah Aikman. Four years later, in 1814, Alexander Aikman Jr. married Mary Bryan (1787–1850) and had seven more children: four daughters and three sons. Alexander Aikman Jr. died in April 1831 at the age of 47, leaving several young children. After his son's death, Alexander Aikman Sr. returned to the family printing business.

Alexander's wife, Louisa, removed to Cowes, Isle of Wight, presumably to be with her daughter, Susannah. It was in Cowes where she raised her grandchildren Alexander Wells and Amelia Ann. In 1831, Louisa died in Isle of Wight, thirteen years after her daughter.

== Death ==
Aikman died on 6 July 1838 at Prospect Park, Saint Andrew, Jamaica, aged 83. He is buried at St. Andrew's Parish Church, commonly called "Half-Way-Tree Church." His son and daughter-in-law Charlotte Cory Aikman is buried in the same cemetery. In an obituary notice, published in Gentleman's Magazine, it was said that "he was a truly honorable, worthy and charitable man, and his death is much lamented."
