= Jonathon D. Hill =

American politician (born 1985)

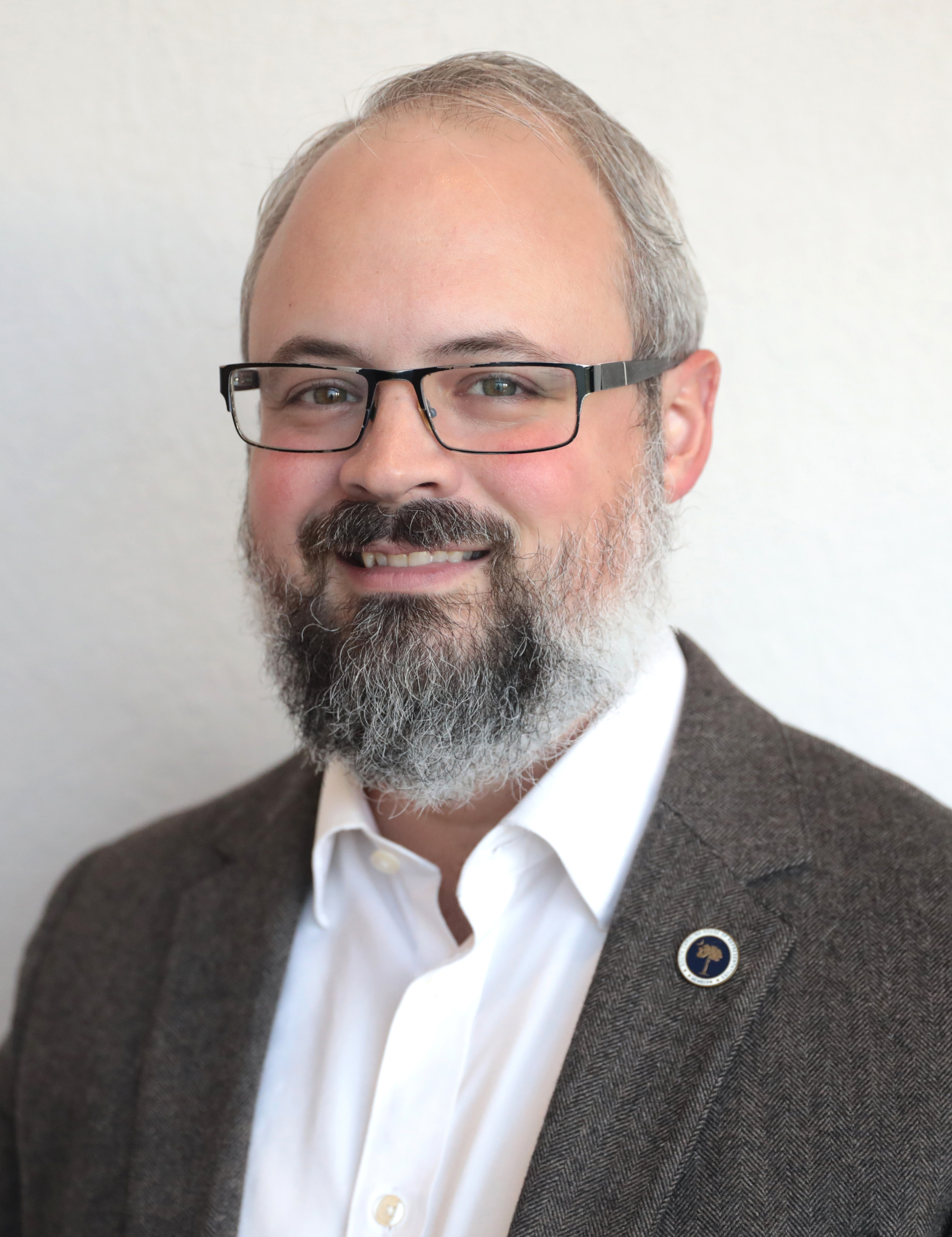
- Hill at the 2022 Hazlitt Summit hosted by Young Americans for Liberty Foundation

Member of the South Carolina House of Representatives from the 8th district
- In office November 10, 2014 – December 6, 2022
- Preceded by: Don Bowen
- Succeeded by: Don Chapman

Personal details
- Born: February 11, 1985 (age 41) Anderson, South Carolina, United States
- Party: Republican

Jonathon D. Hill (born February 11, 1985) is an American politician. He was a member of the South Carolina House of Representatives from the 8th District, serving from November 2014 to December 2022. He is a member of the Republican Party.
