= James Burgess Readman =

Scottish chemist

Dr James Burgess Readman FRSE FCS FSSA (c.1850–April 1927) was a Scottish chemist who invented an electric furnace for creating phosphorus invented in 1888 and patented in 1889.

== Life ==
He was born in Glasgow the son of George Readman, a bank manager with the Clydesdale Bank. The family lived at 16 Queens Crescent in Glasgow, an attractive terraced townhouse in the north-west of the city. He was educated at Glasgow Academy. He then studied science at the University of Edinburgh graduating with a BSc and MD in 1888.

In 1871 he is listed as a creditor in relation to the Port Dundas Oil Company.

In 1879 he is living with his older brother George Readman, an advocate at 20 Great Stuart Street on the Moray Estate in west Edinburgh.

In 1883 he was elected a Fellow of the Royal Society of Edinburgh. His proposers were James Robertson, Baron Robertson, James King, William Wallace and Alexander Crum Brown. He was then still living with his brother (but separately listed) at 9 Moray Place, a large townhouse on the Moray Estate.

In the late 1890s he had offices at 175 Buchanan Street in Glasgow and was running the Forth and Clyde Chemical works from Kirkintilloch.

In 1910 he is described as an "analytical and consulting chemist" and is operating from 4 Lindsay Place in Leith.

He died in Bradford-on-Avon in April 1927.

== Publications ==
- An Account of the Manufacture of Phosphorus (1890)
