= Nikki DuBose =

American model and actress

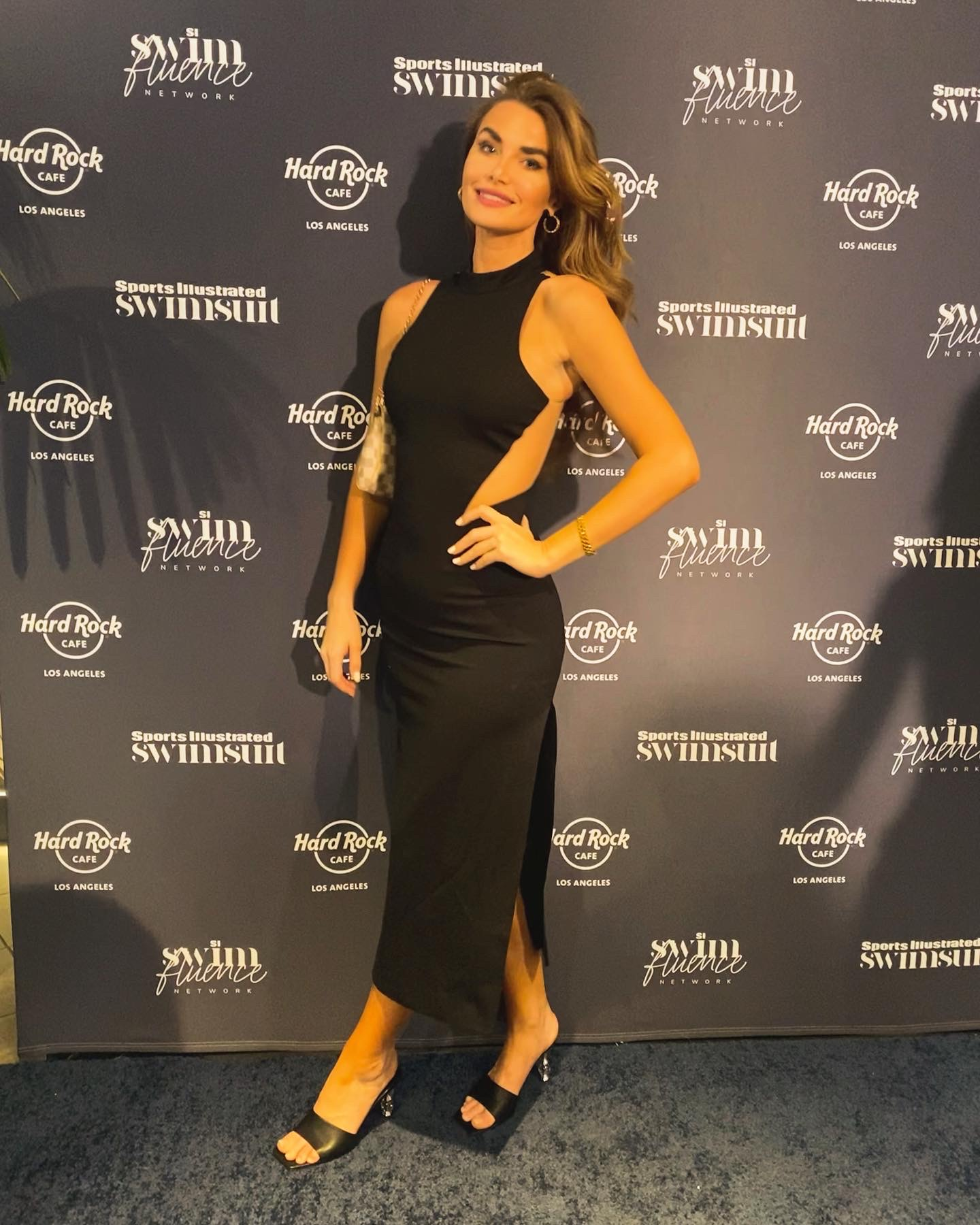
- Nikki DuBose at SI Swimsuit Swimfluence in 2022
- Born: Tara Nicole DuBose; March 21, 1985 (age 41); Charleston, South Carolina, U.S.
- Education: California Southern University (BA); Meridian University
- Occupations: Model, actress, host

Nikki DuBose (born Tara Nicole DuBose; March 21, 1985) is an American model, actress, and host. She is also a mental health advocate, ambassador, and founder of Live ED Free, an eating disorder recovery coaching service.

== Early life and education ==
DuBose was born in Charleston, South Carolina. DuBose holds a B.A. in psychology from California Southern University and is currently studying for a doctorate degree in psychology at Meridian University.

== Career ==
DuBose started her career out in modeling and has been photographed for magazines such as Maxim, Vogue, Vanity Fair, and Glamour.

=== Memoir ===
DuBose released her first publication, Washed Away: From Darkness to Light, in 2016. The memoir outlined her experiences within the modeling industry and the impact this had on her mental health.

=== Advocacy work ===
In 2016, DuBose lent her support for a Californian bill which aimed to ban the use of anorexic models.

In a 2016 interview with People, DuBose disclosed that she was raped and sexually harassed during her time in the modeling industry, which exacerbated her eating disorders.

On January 4, 2017, the New York Daily News and Times Union profiled her advocacy with Senator Brad Hoylman as she pushed for the Omnibus Child Victims Act (S809) at the New York State Capitol, which will "make it easier for survivors to seek legal recourse."

DuBose was also one of 35 models who signed an open letter to the fashion industry urging the prioritization of health and criticizing the industry’s promotion of extreme thinness. The letter was published shortly before New York Fashion Week 2017.

DuBose has appeared on CBS LA to talk about her recovery from mental health problems and how the unregulated modeling industry may have caused her problems. She has also spoken about her experiences on television programs such as The T.D. Jakes Show and The Doctors.

DuBose served as a Celebrity Ambassador for The Shaw Mind Foundation, a global nonprofit based in the United Kingdom that offers support for those suffering from mental health issues. She is currently an Ambassador for Darkness to Light, a nonprofit based in Charleston, South Carolina that provides awareness and education to help adults prevent, recognize, and react responsibly to child sexual abuse and reduce stigma related to it.

=== Coaching ===
DuBose founded the coaching service Live ED Free in 2021.
