= Don Bowen =

American politician (born 1945)

Don C. Bowen

South Carolina House of Representatives
- In office January 2007 – December 2014
- Preceded by: Becky R. Martin
- Succeeded by: Jonathon D. Hill

Personal details
- Born: May 7, 1945 (age 81) Charleston, South Carolina
- Party: Republican
- Spouse: Tomilyn Forrester Bowen
- Occupation: Retired

Don C. Bowen (born May 7, 1945) is an American politician who served in the South Carolina House of Representatives as a Republican. Bowen represented District 8, which comprises regions of Anderson and Oconee Counties, including the city of Anderson.

== Early life ==
Don Bowen was born May 7, 1945, to Carson and Rebecca Bowen. He later graduated from the University of South Carolina with a B.S. On May 7, 1971, he married Tomilyn Forrester Bowen. He has three children: Amy, Don Jr., and Ward.

== S.C. House of Representatives ==
Bowen was elected to the South Carolina House of Representatives from District 8 as a Republican in November 2006. He served on the Education and Public Works (2nd vice-chairman) and Invitations and Memorial Resolutions (Vice-chairman) committees. He was defeated by fellow Republican Jonathon D. Hill in a primary election in 2014.

== Public life ==
- Chairman, United Way for Bi-Lo Supermarkets
- Member, School District One Reform Movement
- Chairman, Anderson Area Accountability Association
- Appointed to the Anderson County Council to the Anderson Ad Hoc Property Tax Study Committee
- South Carolina National Guard (Williamston, SC)
