= Margaret Ackman =

Guyanese politician

- Ackman in New York in 2004

Member of the Parliament of Guyana
- In office 1969–1980

Personal details
- Died: 29 August 2013 New York City, US
- Party: People’s National Congress Reform

Margaret Ackman was a Guyanese politician and a founding member of the People's National Congress Reform (PNCR).

== Early life ==
Margaret Ackman was born in the family of Frederick Ackman, a politician of the People's Progressive Party.

== Career ==
Ackman was one of the founding members of the socialist People's National Congress Reform and, from 1969 to 1980, she represented PNCR in the Guyanese parliament. In June 1953, Ackman was elected the president of Women's Progressive Organisation's permanent committee. Fondly referred as "Madam Pandit", she was also an assistant general secretary in the party and president of Business & Professional Women's Club of Georgetown.

After Patricia Limerick resigned from the Parliament, Ackman was made the government's whip, a post she held till 1973 before being appointed parliamentary secretary in Prime Minister Forbes Burnham's office (1973–80).

== Personal life ==
On the insistence of a PRO of People's Temple Cult, Ackman had visited Jonestown just a few days before the mass suicide took place. She died on 29 August 2013 at her residence in New York City and is survived by her three children. Her sons, Keith Scott and Gurney Ackman, became the leader of the National Front Alliance and served in the United States Army during the Vietnam War respectively.
