= Norb Vonnegut =

American novelist (born 1958)

- Born: Norbert James Vonnegut; April 24, 1958 (age 68); Lake Charles, Louisiana, U.S.
- Education: Phillips Exeter Academy; Harvard College; Harvard Business School
- Occupations: Novelist, Financial Services Commentator
- Writing career
- Period: 2008-present
- Genres: Wall Street thriller Crime fiction
- Website: www.acrimoney.com www.norbvonnegut.com

Norb Vonnegut (born April 24, 1958) is an American author of Wall Street thrillers and a financial commentator on his blog entitled "Acrimoney". He attended Phillips Exeter Academy, and received bachelor's and Master of Business Administration degrees from Harvard University. His business career began in the Philippines and took him to Australia, South Carolina, and Rhode Island before he settled into the wealth management profession in New York City.

Vonnegut's first novel, Top Producer, earned a Publishers Weekly starred review and interview as well as positive reviews on the NBC Today show and in USA Today. On September 29, 2009 he was the sole guest on the Bloomberg Radio program Bloomberg on the Economy. According to his agents, the publication rights to Top Producer have been sold to eight different publishers in seven foreign languages.

His second novel, The Gods of Greenwich, was published in April 2011. Janet Maslin of The New York Times called it "a gleeful peek at the world of hedge fund moguls" and "a funny, savvy book that can be as absurd as its title."

Vonnegut's third novel, The Trust, was published in 2012. Janet Maslin of The New York Times says that "Mr. Vonnegut dreams up diabolically elegant business crimes, then sends smart-talking characters to follow the money." and reaffirms the genre with her claim that "This is money-porn beach reading"

Vonnegut grew up in Charleston, South Carolina where his father was based as a pilot in the United States Air Force. He is a regular contributor to The Huffington Post. He now resides in Bronxville, New York and Narragansett, Rhode Island. He is a fourth cousin to Kurt Vonnegut.

== Books ==
- Top Producer (2009)
- The Gods of Greenwich (2011)
- The Trust (2012)
- Mr. President (2012)
