= William Aikman (writer) =

American writer and pastor

- Born: August 12, 1824; New York City
- Died: January 1, 1909 (aged 84)
- Alma mater: New York University; Union Theological Seminary
- Occupation: Clergyman, writer, pastor (1883–), moderator of the General Assembly (1863–)
- Employer: Wells College (1878–1882)

William Aikman (1824–1909) was an American writer and pastor.

== Biography ==
Aikman was born in New York City, on August 12, 1824, son of Robert and Sarah (Smith) Aikman. He was graduated at the University of the City of New York in 1846, and attended the Union Theological Seminary, from 1846 to 1849.

He served as pastor of various Presbyterian churches, serving that at Atlantic City, New Jersey, from 1883. According to his work The Future of the Colored Race in America, he was pastor of the Hanover Street Presbyterian Church in Wilmington, Delaware, where he ministered for eleven years from June 2, 1857.

Aikman was moderator of the synod of Pennsylvania in 1863, also a trustee of Wells female college, from 1878 to 1882. He received the degree D.D. from the University of the City of New York in 1869.

== Works ==
He was the author of:

- Our Country, Strong in Her Isolation (1851)
- Seductive Powers of the Romish Church (1860)
- The Future of the Colored Race in America (1862); Being an article in the Presbyterian quarterly review of July 1862.
- Government and Administration (1863)
- Moral Power of the Sea (1863)
- Commerce and Christianity (1864)
- Life at Home (1870)
- The Altar in the House (1880)
- Heavenly Recognitions (1882)
- Talks on Married Life (1883)
