= Helena Wells =

American novelist

- Born: Helena Wells; Charleston, South Carolina
- Occupation: Writer
- Spouse: Edward Whitford
- Parent(s): Robert; Mary

Helena Wells, later Whitford (1761?–1824) was an American novelist and writer at the end of the eighteenth century.

== Biography ==
Helena Wells was born in South Carolina between 1758 and 1765, the daughter of the printer and bookseller Robert (1727/8-1824) and Mary Wells, who had emigrated from Scotland in 1753. "By 1775 he (her father) had earned the enmity of the Charleston community, and in 1777–1778 he responded by moving his family to London. Helena never returned to the land of her birth." She "seems to have been a Loyalist who later served as a governess in London". During the 1780s she worked as a teacher and perhaps as a governess and opened a boardinghouse for “young gentlewomen of fortune” with her sister. Robert became a successful bookbinder, bookseller, and then a printer for The South-Carolina and American General Gazette in 1758. Robert was considered an outspoken and inflexible Loyalist, he and his family moved to London in 1777. Robert was very successful in wartime London, and he got a house in Salisbury Square. After the war, the fortunes were not so great for the family. South Carolina would seize his colonial property and didn't give him a fair compensation. He would die in 1794, insolvent.

According to the Oxford Dictionary of National Biography (ODNB), Wells ran a school in London with her sister from 1789 to 1799, and the subject-matter of Letters on Subjects of Importance to the Happiness of Young Females suggests a switch of career to that of governess. In 1801 she married Edward Whitford, and had four children.

== Birth date controversy ==
Her birth is undocumented, but in "A Memoir of His Life" (1818) by her brother Dr. William Charles Wells, who was born in 1757, wrote that Helena was the youngest surviving Wells child, which means she was born no earlier than 1758. On the other hand, Helena's sister Louisa Susannah Wells (born in 1755) recalled in The Journal of a Voyage from Charlestown, S.C., to London (written in 1779) that at age ten she helped take care of two sick infant sisters. If one of these infants was Helena, she might have been born around 1764. (One or both of the babies mentioned must not have survived infancy.)

In Thoughts and Remarks on Establishing an Institution, for the Support and Education of Unportioned Respectable Females (1809) Helena Wells wrote, "It was in the prime of my life (past thirty), that I attempted to place myself at the head of an establishment to board and educate Young Ladies." (If this passage refers to the project she undertook in 1789, her birth year might be 1758.)

== Works ==
Novels

- The Stepmother: a domestic Tale from real life, 1798, 2 vols.
- Constantia Neville; or, The West Indian, 1800. 3 vols.

Non-fiction

- Letters on Subjects of Importance to the Happiness of Young Females, 1799; 2nd edition 1807.
- Thoughts and remarks on establishing an institution for the support and education of unportioned respectable females, 1809.
