= William Charles Wells =

Scottish-American physician and printer

William Charles Wells FRS FRSE FRCP

Personal details
- Born: 24 May 1757 Charleston, Province of South Carolina
- Died: 18 September 1817 (aged 60) Serjeant's Inn, London, England
- Occupation: Physician, printer

William Charles Wells (24 May 1757 – 18 September 1817) was a Scottish-American physician and printer. He lived a life of extraordinary variety, did some notable medical research, and made the first clear statement about natural selection. He applied the idea to the origin of different skin colours in human races, and from the context it seems he thought it might be applied more widely. Charles Darwin said: "[Wells] distinctly recognises the principle of natural selection, and this is the first recognition which has been indicated".

His experiments also allowed to establish the modern theory of the dew point.

== Life ==
Wells was born in Charleston on 24 May 1757, the second son of Mary and Robert Wells, a printer. His parents were Scots who had settled in South Carolina in 1753. He is the brother of Louisa Susannah Wells and Helena Wells.

He was sent to school in Dumfries, Scotland in 1768, at the age of 11, and after completing his preparatory school studies he attended the University of Edinburgh for a year.

Wells returned to Charleston in 1771 and became a medical apprentice under Dr Alexander Garden, a naturalist and physician, who himself was a pupil of Charles Alston, Director of the Botanical Gardens in Edinburgh.

In 1775, soon after the commencement of the American War of Independence, he left Charleston suddenly, and went to London in England. He had been called upon to sign a paper the object of which was to unite the people in a resistance to the claims of the British Government. This he would not do. In 1776 he returned to the University of Edinburgh to study medicine graduating with his medical degree in 1778. In the autumn he returned to London, and attended a course of William Hunter's lectures, took instructions in practical Anatomy, and became a surgeon's pupil at St Bartholomew's Hospital.

In 1779 he went to Holland as a surgeon of the British Army attached to a Scottish regiment. There he received ill-treatment from his commanding officer, and resigned his commission. On the day on which he received his dismissal from the service, he challenged the officer to a duel: the officer refused to respond. Wells then moved to Leiden in the Netherlands and matriculated at the University of Leiden 19 Feb. 1780. On this university he prepared his dissertation. This was the Inaugural Thesis, published at Edinburgh in 1780 when he took the degree of Doctor of Medicine; the subject of his thesis was Cold (De frigore). The title description of his thesis is: Disputatio medica, inauguralis, de frigore ... - Edinburgi : Balfour et Smellie, 1780.

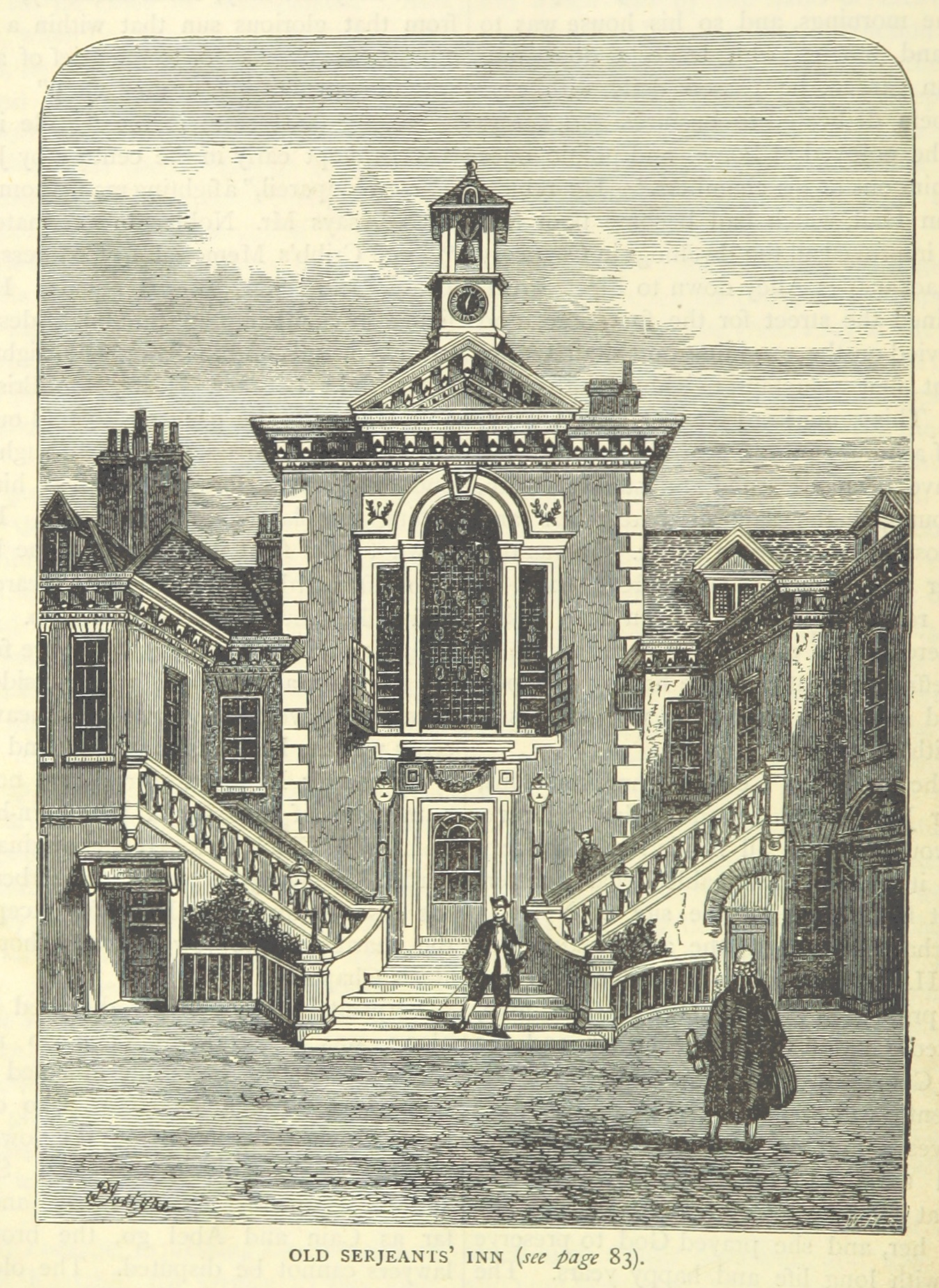
Serjeants' Inn, off Chancery Lane, in the early 1800s, where Wells died.

Early in 1781 he returned to Carolina to put his family's affairs in order. He was "at the same time an officer in a corps of volunteers; a printer, a bookseller, and a merchant, a trustee for some of his father's friends in England for the management of affairs of considerable importance in Carolina; and on one occasion exercised, at the instance of the Colonel Commandant of the militia, the office of Judge Advocate, in conducting a prosecution in a general court martial of militia officers." When the British withdrew from Charleston in December 1782, he traveled to St. Augustine, Florida. There he published the East Florida Gazette, the first weekly newspaper printed in Florida. Other publications during the British period of Florida included the Address of the principal inhabitants of East Florida. He returned to England in 1784 to practice medicine.

In 1790 he was appointed one of the Physicians to the Finsbury Dispensary, and remained so until 1798. In 1793 he was elected Fellow of the Royal Society. In 1798 he was elected Assistant Physician to St Thomas's Hospital; and in 1800 became one of the Physicians. From about 1800, his health was uncertain, and he led a more limited life which was nevertheless fairly productive in medical research.

Wells was elected a Fellow of the Royal Society of Edinburgh in 1814. His proposers were William Miller, Lord Glenlee, John Playfair, and Baron Hume nephew of David Hume the philosopher. In the same year the Royal Society of London awarded him the Rumford Medal for his Essay on Dew.

He died on 18 September 1817 at Serjeant's Inn in London, after suffering symptoms of heart malfunction (auricular fibrillation). He is buried at St Bride's Church. His parents, Robert and Mary Wells, are buried nearby. A tablet was erected by Louisa Susannah Wells "as a tribute of duty to her parents and of affection to her brother."

== Wells' recognition of natural selection ==
Wells was the elder of three British medical men who formulated evolutionary ideas in the period 1813–1819. He was, arguably, the most successful in this endeavour; the others were James Cowles Prichard and William Lawrence.

In 1813 a paper by Wells was read before the Royal Society; it was published in 1818. This was Two Essays... with some observations on the causes of the differences of colour and form between the white and negro races of men. By the Late W.C. Wells…with a Memoir of his life, written by himself.

Wells was clearly interested in how different races might have arisen. After some preliminary remarks on the different races of man, and of the selection of domesticated animals, he observes that:

"[What was done for animals artificially] seems to be done with equal efficiency, though more slowly, by nature, in the formation of varieties of mankind, fitted for the country which they inhabit. Of the accidental varieties of man, which would occur among the first scattered inhabitants, some one would be better fitted than the others to bear the diseases of the country. This race would multiply while the others would decrease, and as the darkest would be the best fitted for the [African] climate, at length [they would] become the most prevalent, if not the only race."

Charles Darwin and Alfred Russel Wallace were not aware of this work when they published their theory in 1858, but later Darwin acknowledged:

"In this paper he [Wells] distinctly recognizes the principle of natural selection, and this is the first recognition which has been indicated; but he applies it only to man, and to certain characters alone. After remarking that negroes and mulattoes enjoy an immunity from certain tropical diseases, he observes, firstly, that all animals tend to vary in some degree, and, secondly, that agriculturalists improve their domesticated animals by selection; and then he adds, but what is done in this latter case by art, seems to be done with equal efficacy, though more slowly, in the formation of varieties of mankind, fitted for the country which they inhabit."

Credit for the first appreciation of natural selection could therefore go to Wells rather than to Edward Blyth or Patrick Matthew. The triumph is limited to the extent of being applied only to skin colour, and not, as Darwin and Wallace did, to the whole range of life. A form of the idea had already been set out by an earlier Edinburgh author, James Hutton, but in that case the effect was limited to improvement of varieties rather than the formation of new species.

== Wells' work on dew ==
In the 1780s, Wells and a few others had the idea that dew and frost occurred when the ground was a few degrees colder than the air above. But they thought the cold was caused by the dew and frost, not the other way around. In the autumn of 1811 Wells took some measurements and soon came to doubt his old idea. He began serious experiments soon after and published the results in August 1814. He compared the formation of dew under varying conditions of material, location, temperature, humidity, weather, cloud cover, season, and time of day. Wells concluded that dew is a condensation of water vapor in the air caused by just the right combination of conditions involving especially temperature, temperature change, and heat conductivity of materials.

Wells' inquiry into the nature of dew were widely cited in the 1830s as an outstanding example of inductive scientific inquiry. Sir John Herschel used it as the primary illustration in his Discourse on the study of Natural Philosophy, calling the theory, "one of the most beautiful specimens we can call to mind of inductive experimental enquiry lying within a moderate compass." In 1836, the Encyclopedia Metropolitana reported, "We know of no work in our day which has been more universally admired than the Treatise of Dr. Wells, certainly none that practically exemplifies in a purer and better form the admirable inductive system which it was the object of Bacon to teach." John Tyndall and William Whewell praised it similarly.

== Publications ==
- Wells W.C. 1814. An essay on dew. Taylor & Hessay, London. [The basis of his Rumford Medal]
- Wells W.C. 1818. Two essays: upon a single vision with two eyes, the other on dew. Constable, London. This contains an appendix titled An account of a female of the white race of mankind, part of whose skin resembles that of a negro, with some observations on the cause of the differences in colour and form between the white and negro races of man. [It is this last part which contains the idea of natural selection. The book, which concludes with a memoir of his life, written by himself, contains the material which he had designated for publication before his death; apparently there was other material destroyed on his instructions].

Most of his writings on medical subjects are contained in the second and third volumes of the Transactions of a Society for the Promotion of Medical and Chirurgical Knowledge 1811-12:

- Observations on Erysipelas.
- An instance of an entire want of hair in the human body.
- Observations on the dropsy which succeeds Scarlet Fever.
- A case of Tetanus, with observations on the disease.
- A case of aneurism of the Aorta, communicating with the Pulmonary artery.
- A case of considerable enlargement of the Cœcum and Colon.
- A case of extensive Gangrene of the cellular membrane between the muscles and skin of the neck and chest.
- On rheumatism of the heart.
- On the presence of the red matter and serum of the blood in the urine of dropsy, which has not originated in Scarlet Fever.
- Observations on Pulmonary Consumption and intermittent fever, chiefly as diseases opposed to each other; with an attempt to arrange several other diseases, according to the alliance or opposition which exists between them, and one or other of the two former.

== Sources ==
All sources depend ultimately on Wells' own account of his life.

- William Munk's Roll of the Royal College of Physicians
- Dictionary of National Biography
- James R. R. William Charles Wells. British Journal of Ophthalmology, November 1928.
