= George Heriot DeReef =

American lawyer and civil rights leader

George Heriot DeReef (September 5, 1869 – August 14, 1937) was an American lawyer, political candidate, civil rights leader, and businessman in Milwaukee, Wisconsin. He was president of the Milwaukee chapter of the NAACP.

== Biography ==
DeReef was born in Charleston, South Carolina to Joseph Moulton Francis DeReef and Georgina Oldfield (née Heriot DeReef). He studied at public schools.in Charleston, Claflin University, and received an A.B. from Howard University. DeReef graduated from Howard University Law School in 1905 with an LL.B. and clerked for municipal judge Robert H. Terrell in Washington, D.C., until moving to Milwaukee and becoming one of a handful of African American attorneys there.

DeReef was a delegate to the Emancipation Liberation Exposition in New York City in 1913. He chaired the Wisconsin Commission to the Half-Century Anniversary Celebration of Negro Freedom in Chicago in 1915. He had his law office in the Empire Building.

In 1924, he won the Republican primary election for state legislature in Milwaukee's sixth district, but did not win the election.

DeReef led the Milwaukee chapter of the NAACP. In Emancipation: The Making of the Black Lawyer, 1844-1944, author J. Clay Smith, Jr., describes DeReef as "a progressive force in the community" who "fought to advance the rights of blacks in Milwaukee."

He served as president of the Columbia Building and Loan Association in Milwaukee and was a director of the Milwaukee Urban League. He lived at 774 Hubbard Street.

DeReef died on August 14, 1937, in Milwaukee.
