= William Wallace (chemist) =

Scottish chemist

Dr William Wallace FRSE FCS (1832–1888) was a 19th-century Scottish chemist who served as Glasgow's first Public analyst. He wrote on various public health issues including sugar refining, gas manufacture and sewage disposal.

== Life ==
He was born on 9 March 1832 in or near Glasgow.

Around 1850 he began assisting at the Anderson College in Glasgow. He then began lecturing in chemistry at the Glasgow College of Science and Arts. He gained his doctorate (PhD) in 1857.

In 1864 he was elected a Fellow of the Royal Society of Edinburgh his proposer being Alexander Bryson.

In 1870 he became a partner in Tatlock, Clarke & Wallace along with Robert Rattray Tatlock (1837-1934) with laboratories on George Street in Glasgow. They were jocularly known as "The Chemical Trinity". In 1874 the firm was appointed Public analyst for the City of Glasgow.

He was President of the Glasgow Philosophical Society 1880 to 1883.

In Glasgow he had offices at 138 Bath Street in the city centre. He lived at 8 Granby Terrace in the Hillhead district and also had a country house named "The Cromlech" at Ardenadam.

He died on 5 November 1888 in Glasgow aged 56. Tatlock continued alone as City Analyst.
