= Louisa Wells Aikman =

American author and music score collector

Louisa Wells Aikman, also known as Louisa Susannah Aikman, (born Louisa Susannah Wells; October 1755 – November 1831) was an American author and music score collector. She is best known for her book, The journal of a voyage from Charleston, S.C., to London.

== Early life ==
Louisa was born in Charleston, South Carolina, British America, on 17 October 1755. Her parents were Robert Wells (1728–1794) and Mary Rowand (1728–1805).

Her father was a major book-trading, printer, and newspaper publisher in Charleston. By 1764, Robert Wells published a newspaper, the South Carolina and American General Gazette. By 1775, Wells claimed to have the largest stock of books for sale in America. While in Charleston, he wrote and published "Travestie of Virgil." Robert Wells was a "fervent Loyalist." Consequently, at the opening of the American Revolutionary War, he left the colonies and returned to London.

Her mother was the eldest child of John Rowand (alt Rowan), merchant of Glasgow, Scotland. John Rowan was a descendant of the unfortunate family of Ruthven, Earle of Gowrie, who relinquished the Ruthven name for Rowand.

She grew up with two brothers and two sisters. Her oldest brother was John Wells (1752–1799). Her younger brother was William Charles Wells, MD (1757–1817). Her older sister was Griselda Wells (1756–1843), who was unmarried. Her youngest sister was Helena Wells (1758–1824) married Edward Whitford (1762–1834). Helena wrote two novels: The Stepmother (1799) and Constantia Neville (1800).

After her Loyalist father fled Charleston for England in 1775, Louisa and her brother remained to manage the family business. Three years later, she was banished as a Loyalist and was forced to leave America. Louisa set sail on June 27, 1778, to seek exile in London. Thus began the journey that would be memorialized in her book.

== Works ==
Louisa Wells Aikman's The Journey of a Voyage from Charleston, S.C., to London under-taken during the American Revolution by a Daughter of an eminent American Loyalist in the Year 1778 and written from memory only in 1779 is a nonfiction work by an 18th-century North American writer. This book is considered a primary source of American history.

In this book, Louisa recounts many stories. Several are recounted in the Smithsonian National Museum of American History. There, several stories are told about Louisa's voyage, particularly the departure from Charleston.

Another story is recounted by the Charleston County Public Library. The library repeats a story about taphophobia as it relates to her father's friend George Woodrop. Years before Louisa's voyage, Robert Wells attended Mr. Woodrop's funeral. On the voyage, Louisa learned additional details about that funeral. When conversing with a fellow passenger, who was a sexton of the church, Louisa learned that Mr. Woodrop had, in fact, been accidentally buried alive in the church cemetery.

Louisa wanted her grandson to preserve her works. In her book's appendix, on page 108, she writes "This Manuscript I desire may be preserved for my Grandson Alexander Wells Aikman whom I brought up from early infancy, and who is now in his fourteenth year. 1821. L.S.A. West Cowes, Isle of Wight."

== Music Collection ==
Louisa's father, Robert Wells, came from Scotland to Charleston as a bookseller in 1753. He also carried hundreds of the latest song sheets and collections of popular tunes from London, Dublin, and Edinburgh. Louisa created a personal songbook composed of approximately 110 sheets of music. Louisa's songbook was purchased in 1992 by the Music Division of the Library of Congress. Individual sheets from her songbook can be viewed in person at the library.

== Family ==
She was married at Kingston, Jamaica on 14 January 1782 to Alexander Aikman (1755–1838), a Scottish printer, newspaper publisher, and landowner. She joined him from England after no little peril, having twice attempted the voyage: on the first attempt, she was captured by the French, by whom she was detained for three months in France, and on the second by a king's ship, in consequence of taking her passage in a slave vessel. Alexander died on 6 July 1838 at Prospect Park, Saint Andrew, Jamaica, aged 83. He is buried at St. Andrew's Parish Church, commonly called "Half-Way-Tree Church." His daughter-in-law Charlotte Cory Aikman is buried in the same cemetery. In an obituary notice, published in Gentleman's Magazine, it was written that "he was a truly honorable, worthy and charitable man, and his death is much lamented."

Alexander and Louisa had two sons and eight daughters. Of their 10 children, six died as infants. All six of those infants are buried near Alexander's brother, Andrew, at The Strangers' Burial Ground in Kingston.

Her three surviving daughters were Mary Ann (1782–1844), the wife of James Smith of Saint Andrews, Jamaica, Ann-Hunter (1788–1841), the widow of John Enright, Surgeon R.N (1795–1817), and Susanna (1791–1818). Her surviving son and successor in the family printing business was Alexander Aikman (1783–1831), who married Charlotte Cory (1781–1810) in 1805, married Mary Bryan (1787–1850) in 1814, and died in April 1831, (see Gentleman's Magazine CI, i, 650) leaving a numerous family.

== Death and burial ==
Louisa removed to Cowes, Isle of Wight, presumably to be with her daughter Susannah. Louisa died in the Isle of Wight on November 29, 1831, 13 years after her daughter. She is buried next to her daughter at the Church of St. John the Baptist, Northwood on Isle of Wight. In the parish churchyard at location K6-240 stands an altar tomb of Portland stone, surrounded by an iron railing, on which the following inscription is found:

Beneath lies interred all that was mortal of Susannah fifth daughter and Seventh Child of Alexander Aikman and Louisa Susannah, his wife, of the Island of Jamaica.

In the memorable Storm of Novr. 17th and 18th 1795, she escaped shipwreck, together with her Father, Mother, and infant Sister when above 2000 of their fellow creatures met a watery grave near the back of this Island. "Those that go down to the Sea in ships, that do business in great waters, these are the works of the Lord and his wonders in the deep! ---but---He brought them to their desired Haven.

An affectionate Mother raised this humble

Monument to her departed Saint whose

pilgrimage ended here.

In a distant land a Son and five daughters

have gone down to the silent Tomb! Of such

is the Kingdom of God.

On the side of the tomb is the following inscription:

J. H. S.

Louisa Susannah

Wife of Alexander Aikman

of Jamaica

Obit. Nov. 29th 1831

Aetat 76
