= 2024 South Carolina House of Representatives election =

- November 5, 2024

All 124 seats in the South Carolina House of Representatives 62 seats needed for a majority
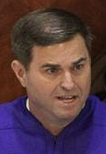

| | Majority party | Minority party |
|---|---|---|
| Leader | Murrell Smith | Todd Rutherford |
| Party | Republican | Democratic |
| Leader since | May 12, 2022 | January 8, 2013 |
| Leader's seat | 67th | 74th |
| Last election | 88 | 36 |
| Seats won | 88 | 36 |
| Seat change | Steady | Steady |
| Popular vote | 1,458,624 | 681,595 |
| Percentage | 67.03% | 31.32% |
| Swing | ▼1.93% | ▲2.01% |
- Republican hold Republican gain Democratic hold Democratic gain 50–60% 60–70% 70–80% 80–90% >90% 50–60% 60–70% 70–80% 80–90% >90%
Speaker before election
Murrell Smith
Republican
Elected Speaker
Murrell Smith
Republican

The 2024 South Carolina House of Representatives election was held on November 5, 2024, alongside the 2024 United States elections. Primary elections took place on June 11, 2024.

== Background ==
As part of the court case, Alexander vs. South Carolina State Conference of the NAACP, the NAACP challenged the legality of the legislative districts enacted by the South Carolina state legislature for the 2022 South Carolina House of Representatives Election by calling the enacted legislative map a racial gerrymander in violation of the Equal Protection Clause of the 14th Amendment. In order to settle the state legislative portion of the case, both parties agreed to a settlement map which was used for the first time in the 2024 South Carolina House of Representatives Election.

== Partisan breakdown ==
In the 2020 US Presidential Election, Donald Trump won 82 districts, while Joe Biden won 42. Going into the 2024 House of Representatives Election, Republicans represented six districts where Biden had won in 2020: District 12 (Biden +5%) in rural McCormick County, District 52 (Biden +20%) in suburban Richland County, District 64 (Biden +4%) in rural Clarendon County, District 110 (Biden +2%) in Charleston County encompassing Charleston Central and Mount Pleasant, District 116 (Biden +6%) in suburban Charleston County, and District 122 (Biden +7%) covering parts of Hampton, Jasper, and Colleton counties.

Biden 40–50% 50–60% 60–70% 70–80% 80–90% / Trump 50–60% 60–70% 70–80% 80–90%

== Overview ==
| Party | Votes | | Seats | | |
| Party | No. | % | No. | +/− | % |
|---|---|---|---|---|---|
| South Carolina Republican Party | 1,402,989 | 62.62 | 88 | 0 | 65.32 |
| South Carolina Democratic Party | 779,644 | 34.80 | 36 | 0 | 33.87 |
| Write-in | 28,855 | 1.29 | 0 | 0 | 0.00 |
| Libertarian Party of South Carolina | 17,443 | 0.78 | 0 | 0 | 0.00 |
| Alliance Party of South Carolina | 7,150 | 0.32 | 0 | 0 | 0.00 |
| South Carolina Constitution Party | 1,805 | 0.08 | 0 | 0 | 0.00 |
| South Carolina Workers Party | 1,650 | 0.07 | 0 | 0 | 0.00 |
| Independent | 599 | 0.03 | 0 | 0 | 0.00 |
| South Carolina Green Party | 256 | 0.01 | 0 | 0 | 0.00 |
| Total | 2,566,154 | 100.00 | 124 | ±0 | 100.00 |
| Registered voters | 3,343,423 | 100.00 | | | |
| Turnout | 2,566,154 | 76.75 | | | |
Source: South Carolina Election Commission

Popular vote
| Republican | 68.96% |
| Democratic | 29.31% |
| Other | 1.74% |

House seats
| Republican | 70.97% |
| Democratic | 29.03% |

== Summary of results ==
Italics denote an open seat held by the incumbent party; bold text denotes a gain for a party.

| State House District | Incumbent | Party | Elected Representative | Outcome |
|---|---|---|---|---|
| 1 | Bill Whitmire | Rep | Bill Whitmire | Rep Hold |
| 2 | Bill Sandifer III | Rep | Adam Lewis Duncan | Rep Hold |
| 3 | Jerry Carter | Rep | Phillip Bowers | Rep Hold |
| 4 | Davey Hiott | Rep | Davey Hiott | Rep Hold |
| 5 | Neal Collins | Rep | Neal Collins | Rep Hold |
| 6 | April Cromer | Rep | April Cromer | Rep Hold |
| 7 | Jay West | Rep | Lee Gilreath | Rep Hold |
| 8 | Don Chapman | Rep | Don Chapman | Rep Hold |
| 9 | Anne Thayer | Rep | Blake Sanders | Rep Hold |
| 10 | Thomas Beach | Rep | Thomas Beach | Rep Hold |
| 11 | Craig A. Gagnon | Rep | Craig A. Gagnon | Rep Hold |
| 12 | Daniel Gibson | Rep | Daniel Gibson | Rep Hold |
| 13 | John R. McCravy III | Rep | John R. McCravy III | Rep Hold |
| 14 | Stewart Jones | Rep | Luke Samuel Rankin | Rep Hold |
| 15 | JA Moore | Dem | JA Moore | Dem Hold |
| 16 | Mark N. Willis | Rep | Mark N. Willis | Rep Hold |
| 17 | Mike Burns | Rep | Mike Burns | Rep Hold |
| 18 | Alan Morgan | Rep | Alan Morgan | Rep Hold |
| 19 | Patrick Haddon | Rep | Patrick Haddon | Rep Hold |
| 20 | Adam Morgan | Rep | Stephen Frank | Rep Hold |
| 21 | Bobby Cox | Rep | Bobby Cox | Rep Hold |
| 22 | Jason Elliott | Rep | Paul Wickensimer | Rep Hold |
| 23 | Chandra Dillard | Dem | Chandra Dillard | Dem Hold |
| 24 | Bruce W. Bannister | Rep | Bruce W. Bannister | Rep Hold |
| 25 | Wendell K. Jones | Dem | Wendell K. Jones | Dem Hold |
| 26 | Raye Felder | Rep | David Martin | Rep Hold |
| 27 | David Vaughan | Rep | David Vaughan | Rep Hold |
| 28 | Ashley Trantham | Rep | Chris Huff | Rep Hold |
| 29 | Dennis Moss | Rep | Dennis Moss | Rep Hold |
| 30 | Brian Lawson | Rep | Brian Lawson | Rep Hold |
| 31 | Rosalyn Henderson-Myers | Dem | Rosalyn Henderson-Myers | Dem Hold |
| 32 | Max Hyde | Rep | Scott Montgomery | Rep Hold |
| 33 | Travis Moore | Rep | Travis Moore | Rep Hold |
| 34 | Roger Nutt | Rep | Sarita Edgerton | Rep Hold |
| 35 | Bill Chumley | Rep | Bill Chumley | Rep Hold |
| 36 | Rob Harris | Rep | Rob Harris | Rep Hold |
| 37 | Steven Wayne Long | Rep | Steven Wayne Long | Rep Hold |
| 38 | Josiah Magnuson | Rep | Josiah Magnuson | Rep Hold |
| 39 | Cal Forrest | Rep | Cal Forrest | Rep Hold |
| 40 | Joe White | Rep | Joe White | Rep Hold |
| 41 | Annie McDaniel | Dem | Annie McDaniel | Dem Hold |
| 42 | Doug Gilliam | Rep | Doug Gilliam | Rep Hold |
| 43 | Randy Ligon | Rep | Randy Ligon | Rep Hold |
| 44 | Mike Neese | Rep | Mike Neese | Rep Hold |
| 45 | Brandon Newton | Rep | Brandon Newton | Rep Hold |
| 46 | Heath Sessions | Rep | Heath Sessions | Rep Hold |
| 47 | Tommy Pope | Rep | Tommy Pope | Rep Hold |
| 48 | Brandon Guffey | Rep | Brandon Guffey | Rep Hold |
| 49 | John Richard C. King | Dem | John Richard C. King | Dem Hold |
| 50 | Will Wheeler | Dem | Will Wheeler | Dem Hold |
| 51 | J. David Weeks | Dem | J. David Weeks | Dem Hold |
| 52 | Vacant | | **Jermaine Johnson** | **Dem Gain** |
| 53 | Richie Yow | Rep | Richie Yow | Rep Hold |
| 54 | Pat Henegan | Dem | Jason S. Luck | Dem Hold |
| 55 | Jackie E. Hayes | Dem | Jackie E. Hayes | Dem Hold |
| 56 | Tim McGinnis | Rep | Tim McGinnis | Rep Hold |
| 57 | Lucas Atkinson | Dem | Lucas Atkinson | Dem Hold |
| 58 | Jeff Johnson | Rep | Jeff Johnson | Rep Hold |
| 59 | Terry Alexander | Dem | Terry Alexander | Dem Hold |
| 60 | Phillip Lowe | Rep | Phillip Lowe | Rep Hold |
| 61 | Carla Schuessler | Rep | Carla Schuessler | Rep Hold |
| 62 | Robert Q. Williams | Dem | Robert Q. Williams | Dem Hold |
| 63 | Jay Jordan | Rep | Jay Jordan | Rep Hold |
| 64 | Fawn Pedalino | Rep | Fawn Pedalino | Rep Hold |
| 65 | Cody Mitchell | Rep | Cody Mitchell | Rep Hold |
| 66 | David L. O'Neal | Rep | Jackie Terribile | Rep Hold |
| 67 | G. Murrell Smith Jr. | Rep | G. Murrell Smith Jr. | Rep Hold |
| 68 | Heather Ammons Crawford | Rep | Heather Ammons Crawford | Rep Hold |
| 69 | Chris Wooten | Rep | Chris Wooten | Rep Hold |
| 70 | Jermaine Johnson | Dem | Robert Reese | Dem Hold |
| 71 | Nathan Ballentine | Rep | Nathan Ballentine | Rep Hold |
| 72 | Seth Rose | Dem | Seth Rose | Dem Hold |
| 73 | Christopher R. Hart | Dem | Christopher R. Hart | Dem Hold |
| 74 | Todd Rutherford | Dem | Todd Rutherford | Dem Hold |
| 75 | Heather Bauer | Dem | Heather Bauer | Dem Hold |
| 76 | Leon Howard | Dem | Leon Howard | Dem Hold |
| 77 | Kambrell Garvin | Dem | Kambrell Garvin | Dem Hold |
| 78 | Beth Bernstein | Dem | Beth Bernstein | Dem Hold |
| 79 | Ivory Torrey Thigpen | Dem | Hamilton R. Grant | Dem Hold |
| 80 | Katherine D. Landing | Rep | Katherine D. Landing | Rep Hold |
| 81 | Bart T. Blackwell | Rep | Charles Hartz | Rep Hold |
| 82 | Bill Clyburn | Dem | Bill Clyburn | Dem Hold |
| 83 | Bill Hixon | Rep | Bill Hixon | Rep Hold |
| 84 | Melissa Lackey Oremus | Rep | Melissa Lackey Oremus | Rep Hold |
| 85 | Jay Kilmartin | Rep | Jay Kilmartin | Rep Hold |
| 86 | Bill Taylor | Rep | Bill Taylor | Rep Hold |
| 87 | Paula Rawl Calhoon | Rep | Paula Rawl Calhoon | Rep Hold |
| 88 | RJ May | Rep | RJ May | Rep Hold |
| 89 | Micah Caskey | Rep | Micah Caskey | Rep Hold |
| 90 | Justin Bamberg | Dem | Justin Bamberg | Dem Hold |
| 91 | Lonnie Hosey | Dem | Lonnie Hosey | Dem Hold |
| 92 | Brandon Cox | Rep | Brandon Cox | Rep Hold |
| 93 | Russell Ott | Dem | Jerry Govan Jr. | Dem Hold |
| 94 | Gil Gatch | Rep | Gil Gatch | Rep Hold |
| 95 | Gilda Cobb-Hunter | Dem | Gilda Cobb-Hunter | Dem Hold |
| 96 | Ryan McCabe | Rep | Ryan McCabe | Rep Hold |
| 97 | Robby Robbins | Rep | Robby Robbins | Rep Hold |
| 98 | Chris Murphy | Rep | Chris Murphy | Rep Hold |
| 99 | Mark Smith | Rep | Mark Smith | Rep Hold |
| 100 | Sylleste Davis | Rep | Sylleste Davis | Rep Hold |
| 101 | Roger K. Kirby | Dem | Roger K. Kirby | Dem Hold |
| 102 | Joseph H. Jefferson | Dem | **Harriet Holman** | **Rep Gain** |
| 103 | Carl Anderson | Dem | Carl Anderson | Dem Hold |
| 104 | William Bailey | Rep | William Bailey | Rep Hold |
| 105 | Kevin Hardee | Rep | Kevin Hardee | Rep Hold |
| 106 | Val Guest Jr. | Rep | Val Guest Jr. | Rep Hold |
| 107 | Case Brittain | Rep | Case Brittain | Rep Hold |
| 108 | Lee Hewitt | Rep | Lee Hewitt | Rep Hold |
| 109 | Tiffany Spann-Wilder | Dem | Tiffany Spann-Wilder | Dem Hold |
| 110 | Tom Hartnett Jr. | Rep | Tom Hartnett Jr. | Rep Hold |
| 111 | Wendell Gilliard | Dem | Wendell Gilliard | Dem Hold |
| 112 | Joe Bustos | Rep | Joe Bustos | Rep Hold |
| 113 | Vacant | | Marvin R. Pendarvis | Dem Hold |
| 114 | Gary Brewer | Rep | Gary Brewer | Rep Hold |
| 115 | Spencer Wetmore | Dem | Spencer Wetmore | Dem Hold |
| 116 | Matt Leber | Rep | James Teeple | Rep Hold |
| 117 | Jordan Pace | Rep | Jordan Pace | Rep Hold |
| 118 | Bill Herbkersman | Rep | Bill Herbkersman | Rep Hold |
| 119 | Leon Stavrinakis | Dem | Leon Stavrinakis | Dem Hold |
| 120 | Weston J. Newton | Rep | Weston J. Newton | Rep Hold |
| 121 | Michael F. Rivers Sr. | Dem | Michael F. Rivers Sr. | Dem Hold |
| 122 | Bill Hager | Rep | Bill Hager | Rep Hold |
| 123 | Jeff Bradley | Rep | Jeff Bradley | Rep Hold |
| 124 | Shannon Erickson | Rep | Shannon Erickson | Rep Hold |

== Retirements ==
Fifteen incumbents did not seek re-election.

=== Democrats ===
1. District 54: Pat Henegan retired.
2. District 79: Ivory Torrey Thigpen retired to run for State Senate.
3. District 93: Russell Ott retired to run for State Senate.

=== Republicans ===
1. District 9: Anne Thayer retired.
2. District 14: Stewart Jones retired to run for U.S. House.
3. District 20: Adam Morgan retired to run for U.S. House.
4. District 22: Jason Elliott retired to run for State Senate.
5. District 26: Raye Felder retired.
6. District 28: Ashley Trantham retired.
7. District 32: Max Hyde retired.
8. District 34: Roger Nutt retired to run for State Senate.
9. District 52: Ben Connell retired.
10. District 66: David O'Neal retired.
11. District 81: Bart T. Blackwell retired.
12. District 116: Matt Leber retired to run for State Senate.

== Resignation ==
One seat was left vacant on the day of the general election due to resignation in 2024.

=== Democrats ===
1. District 113: Marvin Pendarvis resigned September 19 due to an ongoing legal malpractice investigation.

== Incumbents defeated ==
=== In primary election ===
Three incumbent representatives, all Republicans, were defeated in the June 11 primary election.

==== Republicans ====
1. District 2: Bill Sandifer III lost renomination to Adam Lewis Duncan.
2. District 3: Jerry Carter lost renomination to Phillip Bowers.
3. District 7: Jay West lost renomination to Lee Gilreath.

== Closest races ==
Nine races were decided by 10% or lower.

| District | Winner | Margin |
|---|---|---|
| 12 | Republican | 4.58% |
| 54 | Democratic | 4.17% |
| 75 | Democratic | 6.7% |
| 82 | Democratic | 7.84% |
| 91 | Democratic | 3.25% |
| 93 | Democratic | 5.18% |
| 102 | Republican (flip) | 3.87% |
| 115 | Democratic | 3.82% |
| 116 | Republican | 2.41% |
| 122 | Republican | 7.23% |

== Predictions ==
| Source | Ranking | As of |
|---|---|---|
| CNalysis | Solid R | April 11, 2024 |

== Special elections ==
=== District 109 (special) ===
Incumbent Democrat Deon Tedder resigned on January 9, 2024, to join the State Senate. A special election was held on January 30, 2024, to fill the vacancy.

District 109 special election, 2024
| Party | Candidate | Votes | % |
|---|---|---|---|
| Democratic | Tiffany Spann-Wilder | 299 | 97.39 |
| Write-in | | 8 | 2.61 |
| Total votes | | 307 | 100.0 |
| Democratic hold | | | |

== Results by district ==
District 1 • District 2 • District 3 • District 4 • District 5 • District 6 • District 7 • District 8 • District 9 • District 10 • District 11 • District 12 • District 13 • District 14 • District 15 • District 16 • District 17 • District 18 • District 19 • District 20 • District 21 • District 22 • District 23 • District 24 • District 25 • District 26 • District 27 • District 28 • District 29 • District 30 • District 31 • District 32 • District 33 • District 34 • District 35 • District 36 • District 37 • District 38 • District 39 • District 40 • District 41 • District 42 • District 43 • District 44 • District 45 • District 46 • District 47 • District 48 • District 49 • District 50 • District 51 • District 52 • District 53 • District 54 • District 55 • District 56 • District 57 • District 58 • District 59 • District 60 • District 61 • District 62 • District 63 • District 64 • District 65 • District 66 • District 67 • District 68 • District 69 • District 70 • District 71 • District 72 • District 73 • District 74 • District 75 • District 76 • District 77 • District 78 • District 79 • District 80 • District 81 • District 82 • District 83 • District 84 • District 85 • District 86 • District 87 • District 88 • District 89 • District 90 • District 91 • District 92 • District 93 • District 94 • District 95 • District 96 • District 97 • District 98 • District 99 • District 100 • District 101 • District 102 • District 103 • District 104 • District 105 • District 106 • District 107 • District 108 • District 109 • District 110 • District 111 • District 112 • District 113 • District 114 • District 115 • District 116 • District 117 • District 118 • District 119 • District 120 • District 121 • District 122 • District 123 • District 124

=== District 1 ===
District 1 general election, 2024
| Party | Candidate | Votes | % |
|---|---|---|---|
| Republican | Bill Whitmire (incumbent) | 20,495 | 99.13 |
| Write-in | | 179 | 0.87 |
| Total votes | | 20,674 | 100.00 |
| Republican hold | | | |

=== District 2 ===
District 2 general election, 2024
| Party | Candidate | Votes | % |
|---|---|---|---|
| Republican | Adam Lewis Duncan | 16,639 | 95.87 |
| Write-in | | 717 | 4.13 |
| Total votes | | 17,356 | 100.00 |
| Republican hold | | | |

=== District 3 ===
District 3 general election, 2024
| Party | Candidate | Votes | % |
|---|---|---|---|
| Republican | Phillip Bowers | 8,281 | 64.28 |
| Democratic | Eunice Lehmacher | 4,587 | 35.61 |
| Write-in | | 15 | 0.12 |
| Total votes | | 12,883 | 100.00 |
| Republican hold | | | |

=== District 4 ===
District 4 general election, 2024
| Party | Candidate | Votes | % |
|---|---|---|---|
| Republican | Davey Hiott (incumbent) | 19,241 | 98.98 |
| Write-in | | 198 | 1.02 |
| Total votes | | 19,439 | 100.00 |
| Republican hold | | | |

=== District 5 ===
District 5 general election, 2024
| Party | Candidate | Votes | % |
|---|---|---|---|
| Republican | Neal Collins (incumbent) | 17,029 | 98.24 |
| Write-in | | 305 | 1.76 |
| Total votes | | 17,334 | 100.00 |
| Republican hold | | | |

=== District 6 ===
District 6 general election, 2024
| Party | Candidate | Votes | % |
|---|---|---|---|
| Republican | April Cromer (incumbent) | 16,324 | 74.33 |
| Democratic | Tony Wagoner | 5,580 | 25.41 |
| Write-in | | 57 | 0.26 |
| Total votes | | 21,961 | 100.00 |
| Republican hold | | | |

=== District 7 ===
District 7 general election, 2024
| Party | Candidate | Votes | % |
|---|---|---|---|
| Republican | Lee Gilreath | 13,699 | 90.60 |
| Libertarian | Hunter Savirino | 1,368 | 9.05 |
| Write-in | | 54 | 0.36 |
| Total votes | | 15,121 | 100.00 |
| Republican hold | | | |

=== District 8 ===
District 8 general election, 2024
| Party | Candidate | Votes | % |
|---|---|---|---|
| Republican | Don Chapman (incumbent) | 14,314 | 86.90 |
| Alliance | Jackie Todd | 2,090 | 12.69 |
| Write-in | | 67 | 0.41 |
| Total votes | | 16,471 | 100.00 |
| Republican hold | | | |

=== District 9 ===
District 9 general election, 2024
| Party | Candidate | Votes | % |
|---|---|---|---|
| Republican | Blake Sanders | 14,840 | 98.68 |
| Write-in | | 199 | 1.32 |
| Total votes | | 15,039 | 100.00 |
| Republican hold | | | |

=== District 10 ===
District 10 general election, 2024
| Party | Candidate | Votes | % |
|---|---|---|---|
| Republican | Thomas Beach (incumbent) | 16,218 | 98.58 |
| Write-in | | 234 | 1.42 |
| Total votes | | 16,452 | 100.00 |
| Republican hold | | | |

=== District 11 ===
District 11 general election, 2024
| Party | Candidate | Votes | % |
|---|---|---|---|
| Republican | Craig A. Gagnon (incumbent) | 14,815 | 99.48 |
| Write-in | | 78 | 0.52 |
| Total votes | | 14,893 | 100.00 |
| Republican hold | | | |

=== District 12 ===
District 12 general election, 2024
| Party | Candidate | Votes | % |
|---|---|---|---|
| Republican | Daniel Gibson (incumbent) | 8,251 | 52.26 |
| Democratic | Jumelle Brooks | 7,527 | 47.68 |
| Write-in | | 9 | 0.06 |
| Total votes | | 15,787 | 100.00 |
| Republican hold | | | |

=== District 13 ===
District 13 general election, 2024
| Party | Candidate | Votes | % |
|---|---|---|---|
| Republican | John R. McCravy III (incumbent) | 15,880 | 74.75 |
| Democratic | Bill Kimler | 5,346 | 25.17 |
| Write-in | | 17 | 0.08 |
| Total votes | | 21,243 | 100.00 |
| Republican hold | | | |

=== District 14 ===
District 14 general election, 2024
| Party | Candidate | Votes | % |
|---|---|---|---|
| Republican | Luke Samuel Rankin | 13,875 | 96.86 |
| Write-in | | 450 | 3.14 |
| Total votes | | 14,325 | 100.00 |
| Republican hold | | | |

=== District 15 ===
District 15 general election, 2024
| Party | Candidate | Votes | % |
|---|---|---|---|
| Democratic | JA Moore (incumbent) | 6,667 | 55.69 |
| Republican | Carlton Walker | 5,284 | 44.14 |
| Write-in | | 20 | 0.17 |
| Total votes | | 11,971 | 100.00 |
| Democratic hold | | | |

=== District 16 ===
District 16 general election, 2024
| Party | Candidate | Votes | % |
|---|---|---|---|
| Republican | Mark N. Willis (incumbent) | 17,423 | 98.70 |
| Write-in | | 230 | 1.30 |
| Total votes | | 17,653 | 100.00 |
| Republican hold | | | |

=== District 17 ===
District 17 general election, 2024
| Party | Candidate | Votes | % |
|---|---|---|---|
| Republican | Mike Burns (incumbent) | 20,070 | 99.06 |
| Write-in | | 190 | 0.94 |
| Total votes | | 20,260 | 100.00 |
| Republican hold | | | |

=== District 18 ===
District 18 general election, 2024
| Party | Candidate | Votes | % |
|---|---|---|---|
| Republican | Alan Morgan (incumbent) | 18,376 | 98.91 |
| Write-in | | 203 | 1.09 |
| Total votes | | 18,579 | 100.00 |
| Republican hold | | | |

=== District 19 ===
District 19 general election, 2024
| Party | Candidate | Votes | % |
|---|---|---|---|
| Republican | Patrick Haddon (incumbent) | 11,663 | 98.02 |
| Write-in | | 235 | 1.98 |
| Total votes | | 11,898 | 100.00 |
| Republican hold | | | |

=== District 20 ===
District 20 general election, 2024
| Party | Candidate | Votes | % |
|---|---|---|---|
| Republican | Stephen Frank | 13,444 | 68.13 |
| Democratic | Stephen Dreyfus | 6,248 | 31.66 |
| Write-in | | 40 | 0.20 |
| Total votes | | 19,732 | 100.00 |
| Republican hold | | | |

=== District 21 ===
District 21 general election, 2024
| Party | Candidate | Votes | % |
|---|---|---|---|
| Republican | Bobby Cox (incumbent) | 18,184 | 98.28 |
| Write-in | | 319 | 1.72 |
| Total votes | | 18,503 | 100.00 |
| Republican hold | | | |

=== District 22 ===
District 22 general election, 2024
| Party | Candidate | Votes | % |
|---|---|---|---|
| Republican | Paul Wickensimer | 13,243 | 59.99 |
| Democratic | Brann Fowler | 8,794 | 39.84 |
| Write-in | | 39 | 0.18 |
| Total votes | | 22,076 | 100.00 |
| Republican hold | | | |

=== District 23 ===
District 23 general election, 2024
| Party | Candidate | Votes | % |
|---|---|---|---|
| Democratic | Chandra Dillard (incumbent) | 8,868 | 79.97 |
| Libertarian | James Archibald Atkins Jr. | 2,168 | 19.55 |
| Write-in | | 53 | 0.48 |
| Total votes | | 11,089 | 100.00 |
| Democratic hold | | | |

=== District 24 ===
District 24 general election, 2024
| Party | Candidate | Votes | % |
|---|---|---|---|
| Republican | Bruce W. Bannister (incumbent) | 14,021 | 60.37 |
| Democratic | Shauna R. Johnson | 9,171 | 39.48 |
| Write-in | | 35 | 0.15 |
| Total votes | | 23,227 | 100.00 |
| Republican hold | | | |

=== District 25 ===
District 25 general election, 2024
| Party | Candidate | Votes | % |
|---|---|---|---|
| Democratic | Wendell K. Jones (incumbent) | 9,608 | 62.71 |
| Republican | Tim Kennedy | 5,694 | 37.16 |
| Write-in | | 19 | 0.12 |
| Total votes | | 15,321 | 100.00 |
| Democratic hold | | | |

=== District 26 ===
District 26 general election, 2024
| Party | Candidate | Votes | % |
|---|---|---|---|
| Republican | David Martin | 14,358 | 62.56 |
| Democratic | Matt Vilardebo | 8,528 | 37.16 |
| Write-in | | 66 | 0.29 |
| Total votes | | 22,952 | 100.00 |
| Republican hold | | | |

=== District 27 ===
District 27 general election, 2024
| Party | Candidate | Votes | % |
|---|---|---|---|
| Republican | David Vaughan (incumbent) | 13,330 | 60.02 |
| Democratic | John MacCarthy | 8,869 | 39.93 |
| Write-in | | 12 | 0.05 |
| Total votes | | 22,211 | 100.00 |
| Republican hold | | | |

=== District 28 ===
District 28 general election, 2024
| Party | Candidate | Votes | % |
|---|---|---|---|
| Republican | Chris Huff | 15,095 | 64.86 |
| Democratic | J. Fritz Wiebel | 8,145 | 35.00 |
| Write-in | | 33 | 0.14 |
| Total votes | | 23,273 | 100.00 |
| Republican hold | | | |

=== District 29 ===
District 29 general election, 2024
| Party | Candidate | Votes | % |
|---|---|---|---|
| Republican | Dennis Moss (incumbent) | 16,294 | 99.23 |
| Write-in | | 127 | 0.77 |
| Total votes | | 16,421 | 100.00 |
| Republican hold | | | |

=== District 30 ===
District 30 general election, 2024
| Party | Candidate | Votes | % |
|---|---|---|---|
| Republican | Brian Lawson (incumbent) | 14,196 | 79.33 |
| Democratic | Ysante McDowell | 3,684 | 20.59 |
| Write-in | | 15 | 0.08 |
| Total votes | | 17,895 | 100.00 |
| Republican hold | | | |

=== District 31 ===
District 31 general election, 2024
| Party | Candidate | Votes | % |
|---|---|---|---|
| Democratic | Rosalyn Henderson-Myers (incumbent) | 8,730 | 98.50 |
| Write-in | | 133 | 1.50 |
| Total votes | | 8,863 | 100.00 |
| Democratic hold | | | |

=== District 32 ===
District 32 general election, 2024
| Party | Candidate | Votes | % |
|---|---|---|---|
| Republican | Scott Montgomery | 12,786 | 98.08 |
| Write-in | | 250 | 1.92 |
| Total votes | | 13,036 | 100.00 |
| Republican hold | | | |

=== District 33 ===
District 33 general election, 2024
| Party | Candidate | Votes | % |
|---|---|---|---|
| Republican | Travis Moore (incumbent) | 14,848 | 71.86 |
| Democratic | Clemson Turregano | 5,770 | 27.92 |
| Write-in | | 45 | 0.22 |
| Total votes | | 20,663 | 100.00 |
| Republican hold | | | |

=== District 34 ===
District 34 general election, 2024
| Party | Candidate | Votes | % |
|---|---|---|---|
| Republican | Sarita Edgerton | 16,061 | 98.35 |
| Write-in | | 269 | 1.65 |
| Total votes | | 16,330 | 100.00 |
| Republican hold | | | |

=== District 35 ===
District 35 general election, 2024
| Party | Candidate | Votes | % |
|---|---|---|---|
| Republican | Bill Chumley (incumbent) | 19,136 | 98.05 |
| Write-in | | 380 | 1.95 |
| Total votes | | 19,516 | 100.00 |
| Republican hold | | | |

=== District 36 ===
District 36 general election, 2024
| Party | Candidate | Votes | % |
|---|---|---|---|
| Republican | Rob Harris (incumbent) | 14,083 | 98.25 |
| Write-in | | 251 | 1.75 |
| Total votes | | 14,334 | 100.00 |
| Republican hold | | | |

=== District 37 ===
District 37 general election, 2024
| Party | Candidate | Votes | % |
|---|---|---|---|
| Republican | Steven Wayne Long (incumbent) | 15,207 | 98.40 |
| Write-in | | 248 | 1.60 |
| Total votes | | 15,455 | 100.00 |
| Republican hold | | | |

=== District 38 ===
District 38 general election, 2024
| Party | Candidate | Votes | % |
|---|---|---|---|
| Republican | Josiah Magnuson (incumbent) | 18,163 | 81.61 |
| Democratic | J.R. Taylor | 4,052 | 18.21 |
| Write-in | | 40 | 0.18 |
| Total votes | | 22,255 | 100.00 |
| Republican hold | | | |

=== District 39 ===
District 39 general election, 2024
| Party | Candidate | Votes | % |
|---|---|---|---|
| Republican | Cal Forrest (incumbent) | 17,575 | 99.25 |
| Write-in | | 133 | 0.75 |
| Total votes | | 17,708 | 100.00 |
| Republican hold | | | |

=== District 40 ===
District 40 general election, 2024
| Party | Candidate | Votes | % |
|---|---|---|---|
| Republican | Joe White (incumbent) | 15,082 | 98.42 |
| Write-in | | 242 | 1.58 |
| Total votes | | 15,324 | 100.00 |
| Republican hold | | | |

=== District 41 ===
District 41 general election, 2024
| Party | Candidate | Votes | % |
|---|---|---|---|
| Democratic | Annie McDaniel (incumbent) | 15,172 | 98.11 |
| Write-in | | 293 | 1.89 |
| Total votes | | 15,465 | 100.00 |
| Democratic hold | | | |

=== District 42 ===
District 42 general election, 2024
| Party | Candidate | Votes | % |
|---|---|---|---|
| Republican | Doug Gilliam (incumbent) | 11,278 | 67.96 |
| Democratic | David Gossett | 5,288 | 31.87 |
| Write-in | | 29 | 0.17 |
| Total votes | | 16,595 | 100.00 |
| Republican hold | | | |

=== District 43 ===
District 43 general election, 2024
| Party | Candidate | Votes | % |
|---|---|---|---|
| Republican | Randy Ligon (incumbent) | 15,937 | 99.01 |
| Write-in | | 159 | 0.99 |
| Total votes | | 16,096 | 100.00 |
| Republican hold | | | |

=== District 44 ===
District 44 general election, 2024
| Party | Candidate | Votes | % |
|---|---|---|---|
| Republican | Mike Neese (incumbent) | 16,918 | 60.98 |
| Democratic | Katie Crosby | 10,795 | 38.91 |
| Write-in | | 30 | 0.11 |
| Total votes | | 27,743 | 100.00 |
| Republican hold | | | |

=== District 45 ===
District 45 general election, 2024
| Party | Candidate | Votes | % |
|---|---|---|---|
| Republican | Brandon Newton (incumbent) | 12,284 | 64.31 |
| Democratic | Nicole Ventour | 6,785 | 35.52 |
| Write-in | | 32 | 0.17 |
| Total votes | | 19,101 | 100.00 |
| Republican hold | | | |

=== District 46 ===
District 46 general election, 2024
| Party | Candidate | Votes | % |
|---|---|---|---|
| Republican | Heath Sessions (incumbent) | 12,293 | 59.90 |
| Democratic | John Zabel | 8,214 | 40.02 |
| Write-in | | 16 | 0.08 |
| Total votes | | 20,523 | 100.00 |
| Republican hold | | | |

=== District 47 ===
District 47 general election, 2024
| Party | Candidate | Votes | % |
|---|---|---|---|
| Republican | Tommy Pope (incumbent) | 19,625 | 98.81 |
| Write-in | | 236 | 1.19 |
| Total votes | | 19,861 | 100.00 |
| Republican hold | | | |

=== District 48 ===
District 48 general election, 2024
| Party | Candidate | Votes | % |
|---|---|---|---|
| Republican | Brandon Guffey (incumbent) | 18,609 | 98.11 |
| Write-in | | 359 | 1.89 |
| Total votes | | 18,968 | 100.00 |
| Republican hold | | | |

=== District 49 ===
District 49 general election, 2024
| Party | Candidate | Votes | % |
|---|---|---|---|
| Democratic | John Richard C. King (incumbent) | 12,546 | 98.14 |
| Write-in | | 238 | 1.86 |
| Total votes | | 12,784 | 100.00 |
| Democratic hold | | | |

=== District 50 ===
District 50 general election, 2024
| Party | Candidate | Votes | % |
|---|---|---|---|
| Democratic | Will Wheeler (incumbent) | 13,512 | 98.12 |
| Write-in | | 259 | 1.88 |
| Total votes | | 13,771 | 100.00 |
| Democratic hold | | | |

=== District 51 ===
District 51 general election, 2024
| Party | Candidate | Votes | % |
|---|---|---|---|
| Democratic | J. David Weeks (incumbent) | 11,824 | 98.72 |
| Write-in | | 153 | 1.28 |
| Total votes | | 11,977 | 100.00 |
| Democratic hold | | | |

=== District 52 ===
District 52 general election, 2024
| Party | Candidate | Votes | % |
|---|---|---|---|
| Democratic | Jermaine Johnson | 14,205 | 97.70 |
| Write-in | | 335 | 2.30 |
| Total votes | | 14,540 | 100.00 |
| Democratic gain from Republican | | | |

=== District 53 ===
District 53 general election, 2024
| Party | Candidate | Votes | % |
|---|---|---|---|
| Republican | Richie Yow (incumbent) | 13,365 | 73.74 |
| Democratic | Bruce Wallace | 4,738 | 26.14 |
| Write-in | | 22 | 0.12 |
| Total votes | | 18,125 | 100.00 |
| Republican hold | | | |

=== District 54 ===
District 54 general election, 2024
| Party | Candidate | Votes | % |
|---|---|---|---|
| Democratic | Jason S. Luck | 8,371 | 52.02 |
| Republican | Sterling McDiarmid | 7,700 | 47.85 |
| Write-in | | 20 | 0.12 |
| Total votes | | 16,091 | 100.00 |
| Democratic hold | | | |

=== District 55 ===
District 55 general election, 2024
| Party | Candidate | Votes | % |
|---|---|---|---|
| Democratic | Jackie E. Hayes (incumbent) | 12,488 | 98.63 |
| Write-in | | 173 | 1.37 |
| Total votes | | 12,661 | 100.00 |
| Democratic hold | | | |

=== District 56 ===
District 56 general election, 2024
| Party | Candidate | Votes | % |
|---|---|---|---|
| Republican | Tim McGinnis (incumbent) | 21,060 | 99.04 |
| Write-in | | 205 | 0.96 |
| Total votes | | 21,265 | 100.00 |
| Republican hold | | | |

=== District 57 ===
District 57 general election, 2024
| Party | Candidate | Votes | % |
|---|---|---|---|
| Democratic | Lucas Atkinson (incumbent) | 10,897 | 58.61 |
| Republican | Kevin Taylor Coleridge | 7,645 | 41.12 |
| Write-in | | 50 | 0.27 |
| Total votes | | 18,592 | 100.00 |
| Democratic hold | | | |

=== District 58 ===
District 58 general election, 2024
| Party | Candidate | Votes | % |
|---|---|---|---|
| Republican | Jeff Johnson (incumbent) | 16,286 | 99.15 |
| Write-in | | 140 | 0.85 |
| Total votes | | 16,426 | 100.00 |
| Republican hold | | | |

=== District 59 ===
District 59 general election, 2024
| Party | Candidate | Votes | % |
|---|---|---|---|
| Democratic | Terry Alexander (incumbent) | 11,049 | 98.24 |
| Write-in | | 198 | 1.76 |
| Total votes | | 11,247 | 100.00 |
| Democratic hold | | | |

=== District 60 ===
District 60 general election, 2024
| Party | Candidate | Votes | % |
|---|---|---|---|
| Republican | Phillip Lowe (incumbent) | 14,413 | 98.92 |
| Write-in | | 157 | 1.08 |
| Total votes | | 14,570 | 100.00 |
| Republican hold | | | |

=== District 61 ===
District 61 general election, 2024
| Party | Candidate | Votes | % |
|---|---|---|---|
| Republican | Carla Schuessler (incumbent) | 13,645 | 98.78 |
| Write-in | | 168 | 1.22 |
| Total votes | | 13,813 | 100.00 |
| Republican hold | | | |

=== District 62 ===
District 62 general election, 2024
| Party | Candidate | Votes | % |
|---|---|---|---|
| Democratic | Robert Q. Williams (incumbent) | 11,534 | 97.77 |
| Write-in | | 263 | 2.23 |
| Total votes | | 11,797 | 100.00 |
| Democratic hold | | | |

=== District 63 ===
District 63 general election, 2024
| Party | Candidate | Votes | % |
|---|---|---|---|
| Republican | Jay Jordan (incumbent) | 12,633 | 66.37 |
| Democratic | Kory Haskins | 6,386 | 33.55 |
| Write-in | | 15 | 0.08 |
| Total votes | | 19,034 | 100.00 |
| Republican hold | | | |

=== District 64 ===
District 64 general election, 2024
| Party | Candidate | Votes | % |
|---|---|---|---|
| Republican | Fawn Pedalino (incumbent) | 11,055 | 55.76 |
| Democratic | Quadri Bell | 8,758 | 44.18 |
| Write-in | | 12 | 0.06 |
| Total votes | | 19,825 | 100.00 |
| Republican hold | | | |

=== District 65 ===
District 65 general election, 2024
| Party | Candidate | Votes | % |
|---|---|---|---|
| Republican | Cody Mitchell (incumbent) | 15,665 | 99.23 |
| Write-in | | 121 | 0.77 |
| Total votes | | 15,786 | 100.00 |
| Republican hold | | | |

=== District 66 ===
District 66 general election, 2024
| Party | Candidate | Votes | % |
|---|---|---|---|
| Republican | Jackie Terribile | 15,552 | 90.58 |
| Write-in | | 1,618 | 9.42 |
| Total votes | | 17,170 | 100.00 |
| Republican hold | | | |

=== District 67 ===
District 67 general election, 2024
| Party | Candidate | Votes | % |
|---|---|---|---|
| Republican | G. Murrell Smith Jr. (incumbent) | 13,683 | 98.41 |
| Write-in | | 221 | 1.59 |
| Total votes | | 13,904 | 100.00 |
| Republican hold | | | |

=== District 68 ===
District 68 general election, 2024
| Party | Candidate | Votes | % |
|---|---|---|---|
| Republican | Heather Ammons Crawford (incumbent) | 18,119 | 99.00 |
| Write-in | | 183 | 1.00 |
| Total votes | | 18,302 | 100.00 |
| Republican hold | | | |

=== District 69 ===
District 69 general election, 2024
| Party | Candidate | Votes | % |
|---|---|---|---|
| Republican | Chris Wooten (incumbent) | 14,660 | 81.45 |
| Libertarian | Allen James Broadus | 3,231 | 17.95 |
| Write-in | | 108 | 0.60 |
| Total votes | | 17,999 | 100.00 |
| Republican hold | | | |

=== District 70 ===
District 70 general election, 2024
| Party | Candidate | Votes | % |
|---|---|---|---|
| Democratic | Robert Reese | 13,752 | 97.26 |
| Write-in | | 388 | 2.74 |
| Total votes | | 14,140 | 100.00 |
| Democratic hold | | | |

=== District 71 ===
District 71 general election, 2024
| Party | Candidate | Votes | % |
|---|---|---|---|
| Republican | Nathan Ballentine (incumbent) | 18,992 | 98.07 |
| Write-in | | 374 | 1.93 |
| Total votes | | 19,366 | 100.00 |
| Republican hold | | | |

=== District 72 ===
District 72 general election, 2024
| Party | Candidate | Votes | % |
|---|---|---|---|
| Democratic | Seth Rose (incumbent) | 8,282 | 98.96 |
| Write-in | | 87 | 1.04 |
| Total votes | | 8,369 | 100.00 |
| Democratic hold | | | |

=== District 73 ===
District 73 general election, 2024
| Party | Candidate | Votes | % |
|---|---|---|---|
| Democratic | Christopher R. Hart (incumbent) | 11,952 | 98.97 |
| Write-in | | 124 | 1.03 |
| Total votes | | 12,076 | 100.00 |
| Democratic hold | | | |

=== District 74 ===
District 74 general election, 2024
| Party | Candidate | Votes | % |
|---|---|---|---|
| Democratic | Todd Rutherford (incumbent) | 12,303 | 98.42 |
| Write-in | | 197 | 1.58 |
| Total votes | | 12,500 | 100.00 |
| Democratic hold | | | |

=== District 75 ===
District 75 general election, 2024
| Party | Candidate | Votes | % |
|---|---|---|---|
| Democratic | Heather Bauer (incumbent) | 9,846 | 53.31 |
| Republican | Kirkman Finlay III | 8,610 | 46.61 |
| Write-in | | 15 | 0.08 |
| Total votes | | 18,471 | 100.00 |
| Democratic hold | | | |

=== District 76 ===
District 76 general election, 2024
| Party | Candidate | Votes | % |
|---|---|---|---|
| Democratic | Leon Howard (incumbent) | 12,651 | 92.00 |
| SCWP | Gary Votour | 1,052 | 7.65 |
| Write-in | | 48 | 0.35 |
| Total votes | | 13,751 | 100.00 |
| Democratic hold | | | |

=== District 77 ===
District 77 general election, 2024
| Party | Candidate | Votes | % |
|---|---|---|---|
| Democratic | Kambrell Garvin (incumbent) | 17,863 | 99.08 |
| Write-in | | 165 | 0.92 |
| Total votes | | 18,028 | 100.00 |
| Democratic hold | | | |

=== District 78 ===
District 78 general election, 2024
| Party | Candidate | Votes | % |
|---|---|---|---|
| Democratic | Beth Bernstein (incumbent) | 14,847 | 98.72 |
| Write-in | | 193 | 1.28 |
| Total votes | | 15,040 | 100.00 |
| Democratic hold | | | |

=== District 79 ===
District 79 general election, 2024
| Party | Candidate | Votes | % |
|---|---|---|---|
| Democratic | Hamilton R. Grant | 14,831 | 75.27 |
| Republican | Rebecca Madsen | 4,851 | 24.62 |
| Write-in | | 21 | 0.11 |
| Total votes | | 19,703 | 100.00 |
| Democratic hold | | | |

=== District 80 ===
District 80 general election, 2024
| Party | Candidate | Votes | % |
|---|---|---|---|
| Republican | Katherine D. Landing (incumbent) | 16,029 | 65.12 |
| Democratic | Donna Brown Newton | 8,574 | 34.83 |
| Write-in | | 13 | 0.05 |
| Total votes | | 24,616 | 100.00 |
| Republican hold | | | |

=== District 81 ===
District 81 general election, 2024
| Party | Candidate | Votes | % |
|---|---|---|---|
| Republican | Charles Hartz | 16,290 | 68.02 |
| Democratic | Jensen Jennings | 7,630 | 31.86 |
| Write-in | | 29 | 0.12 |
| Total votes | | 23,949 | 100.00 |
| Republican hold | | | |

=== District 82 ===
District 82 general election, 2024
| Party | Candidate | Votes | % |
|---|---|---|---|
| Democratic | Bill Clyburn (incumbent) | 8,982 | 53.90 |
| Republican | Suzanne Spurgeon | 7,676 | 46.06 |
| Write-in | | 7 | 0.04 |
| Total votes | | 16,665 | 100.00 |
| Democratic hold | | | |

=== District 83 ===
District 83 general election, 2024
| Party | Candidate | Votes | % |
|---|---|---|---|
| Republican | Bill Hixon (incumbent) | 17,038 | 98.73 |
| Write-in | | 220 | 1.27 |
| Total votes | | 17,258 | 100.00 |
| Republican hold | | | |

=== District 84 ===
District 84 general election, 2024
| Party | Candidate | Votes | % |
|---|---|---|---|
| Republican | Melissa Lackey Oremus (incumbent) | 15,098 | 98.83 |
| Write-in | | 179 | 1.17 |
| Total votes | | 15,277 | 100.00 |
| Republican hold | | | |

=== District 85 ===
District 85 general election, 2024
| Party | Candidate | Votes | % |
|---|---|---|---|
| Republican | Jay Kilmartin (incumbent) | 17,933 | 98.12 |
| Write-in | | 343 | 1.88 |
| Total votes | | 18,276 | 100.00 |
| Republican hold | | | |

=== District 86 ===
District 86 general election, 2024
| Party | Candidate | Votes | % |
|---|---|---|---|
| Republican | Bill Taylor (incumbent) | 14,950 | 98.84 |
| Write-in | | 175 | 1.16 |
| Total votes | | 15,125 | 100.00 |
| Republican hold | | | |

=== District 87 ===
District 87 general election, 2024
| Party | Candidate | Votes | % |
|---|---|---|---|
| Republican | Paula Rawl Calhoon (incumbent) | 18,574 | 85.58 |
| Libertarian | Robin Machajewski | 3,046 | 14.03 |
| Write-in | | 84 | 0.39 |
| Total votes | | 21,704 | 100.00 |
| Republican hold | | | |

=== District 88 ===
District 88 general election, 2024
| Party | Candidate | Votes | % |
|---|---|---|---|
| Republican | RJ May (incumbent) | 13,020 | 92.18 |
| Write-in | | 1,104 | 7.82 |
| Total votes | | 14,124 | 100.00 |
| Republican hold | | | |

=== District 89 ===
District 89 general election, 2024
| Party | Candidate | Votes | % |
|---|---|---|---|
| Republican | Micah Caskey (incumbent) | 10,158 | 60.24 |
| Democratic | Wayne Borders | 6,681 | 39.62 |
| Write-in | | 23 | 0.14 |
| Total votes | | 16,862 | 100.00 |
| Republican hold | | | |

=== District 90 ===
District 90 general election, 2024
| Party | Candidate | Votes | % |
|---|---|---|---|
| Democratic | Justin Bamberg (incumbent) | 10,625 | 59.92 |
| Republican | H. Frank Dickson | 7,085 | 39.96 |
| Write-in | | 22 | 0.12 |
| Total votes | | 17,732 | 100.00 |
| Democratic hold | | | |

=== District 91 ===
District 91 general election, 2024
| Party | Candidate | Votes | % |
|---|---|---|---|
| Democratic | Lonnie Hosey (incumbent) | 9,274 | 51.60 |
| Republican | Ben Kinlaw | 8,690 | 48.35 |
| Write-in | | 10 | 0.06 |
| Total votes | | 17,974 | 100.00 |
| Democratic hold | | | |

=== District 92 ===
District 92 general election, 2024
| Party | Candidate | Votes | % |
|---|---|---|---|
| Republican | Brandon Cox (incumbent) | 12,632 | 97.90 |
| Write-in | | 271 | 2.10 |
| Total votes | | 12,903 | 100.00 |
| Republican hold | | | |

=== District 93 ===
District 93 general election, 2024
| Party | Candidate | Votes | % |
|---|---|---|---|
| Democratic | Jerry Govan Jr. | 10,145 | 51.58 |
| Republican | Krista Hassell | 9,127 | 46.40 |
| SCWP | Harold Geddings | 360 | 1.83 |
| Write-in | | 38 | 0.19 |
| Total votes | | 19,670 | 100.00 |
| Democratic hold | | | |

=== District 94 ===
District 94 general election, 2024
| Party | Candidate | Votes | % |
|---|---|---|---|
| Republican | Gil Gatch (incumbent) | 13,649 | 98.20 |
| Write-in | | 250 | 1.80 |
| Total votes | | 13,899 | 100.00 |
| Republican hold | | | |

=== District 95 ===
District 95 general election, 2024
| Party | Candidate | Votes | % |
|---|---|---|---|
| Democratic | Gilda Cobb-Hunter (incumbent) | 12,568 | 98.27 |
| Write-in | | 221 | 1.73 |
| Total votes | | 12,789 | 100.00 |
| Democratic hold | | | |

=== District 96 ===
District 96 general election, 2024
| Party | Candidate | Votes | % |
|---|---|---|---|
| Republican | Ryan McCabe (incumbent) | 14,055 | 99.08 |
| Write-in | | 131 | 0.92 |
| Total votes | | 14,186 | 100.00 |
| Republican hold | | | |

=== District 97 ===
District 97 general election, 2024
| Party | Candidate | Votes | % |
|---|---|---|---|
| Republican | Robby Robbins (incumbent) | 15,464 | 99.06 |
| Write-in | | 146 | 0.94 |
| Total votes | | 15,610 | 100.00 |
| Republican hold | | | |

=== District 98 ===
District 98 general election, 2024
| Party | Candidate | Votes | % |
|---|---|---|---|
| Republican | Chris Murphy (incumbent) | 9,838 | 56.86 |
| Democratic | Sonja Ogletree Satani | 7,429 | 42.93 |
| Write-in | | 36 | 0.21 |
| Total votes | | 17,303 | 100.00 |
| Republican hold | | | |

=== District 99 ===
District 99 general election, 2024
| Party | Candidate | Votes | % |
|---|---|---|---|
| Republican | Mark Smith (incumbent) | 16,409 | 98.51 |
| Write-in | | 249 | 1.49 |
| Total votes | | 16,658 | 100.00 |
| Republican hold | | | |

=== District 100 ===
District 100 general election, 2024
| Party | Candidate | Votes | % |
|---|---|---|---|
| Republican | Sylleste Davis (incumbent) | 14,596 | 98.61 |
| Write-in | | 205 | 1.39 |
| Total votes | | 14,801 | 100.00 |
| Republican hold | | | |

=== District 101 ===
District 101 general election, 2024
| Party | Candidate | Votes | % |
|---|---|---|---|
| Democratic | Roger K. Kirby (incumbent) | 12,531 | 98.45 |
| Write-in | | 197 | 1.55 |
| Total votes | | 12,728 | 100.00 |
| Democratic hold | | | |

=== District 102 ===
District 102 general election, 2024
| Party | Candidate | Votes | % |
|---|---|---|---|
| Republican | Harriet Holman | 10,773 | 51.87 |
| Democratic | Joseph H. Jefferson (incumbent) | 9,969 | 48.00 |
| Write-in | | 27 | 0.13 |
| Total votes | | 20,769 | 100.00 |
| Republican gain from Democratic | | | |

=== District 103 ===
District 103 general election, 2024
| Party | Candidate | Votes | % |
|---|---|---|---|
| Democratic | Carl Anderson (incumbent) | 11,367 | 98.40 |
| Write-in | | 185 | 1.60 |
| Total votes | | 11,552 | 100.00 |
| Democratic hold | | | |

=== District 104 ===
District 104 general election, 2024
| Party | Candidate | Votes | % |
|---|---|---|---|
| Republican | William Bailey (incumbent) | 24,670 | 99.38 |
| Write-in | | 155 | 0.62 |
| Total votes | | 24,825 | 100.00 |
| Republican hold | | | |

=== District 105 ===
District 105 general election, 2024
| Party | Candidate | Votes | % |
|---|---|---|---|
| Republican | Kevin Hardee (incumbent) | 19,214 | 99.25 |
| Write-in | | 146 | 0.75 |
| Total votes | | 19,360 | 100.00 |
| Republican hold | | | |

=== District 106 ===
District 106 general election, 2024
| Party | Candidate | Votes | % |
|---|---|---|---|
| Republican | Val Guest Jr. (incumbent) | 21,778 | 98.53 |
| Write-in | | 324 | 1.47 |
| Total votes | | 22,102 | 100.00 |
| Republican hold | | | |

=== District 107 ===
District 107 general election, 2024
| Party | Candidate | Votes | % |
|---|---|---|---|
| Republican | Case Brittain (incumbent) | 16,658 | 98.70 |
| Write-in | | 219 | 1.30 |
| Total votes | | 16,877 | 100.00 |
| Republican hold | | | |

=== District 108 ===
District 108 general election, 2024
| Party | Candidate | Votes | % |
|---|---|---|---|
| Republican | Lee Hewitt (incumbent) | 20,536 | 99.30 |
| Write-in | | 144 | 0.70 |
| Total votes | | 20,680 | 100.00 |
| Republican hold | | | |

=== District 109 ===
District 109 general election, 2024
| Party | Candidate | Votes | % |
|---|---|---|---|
| Democratic | Tiffany Spann-Wilder (incumbent) | 10,157 | 98.03 |
| Write-in | | 204 | 1.97 |
| Total votes | | 10,361 | 100.00 |
| Democratic hold | | | |

=== District 110 ===
District 110 general election, 2024
| Party | Candidate | Votes | % |
|---|---|---|---|
| Republican | Tom Hartnett Jr. (incumbent) | 12,907 | 55.94 |
| Democratic | John Moffett | 10,145 | 43.97 |
| Write-in | | 20 | 0.09 |
| Total votes | | 23,072 | 100.00 |
| Republican hold | | | |

=== District 111 ===
District 111 general election, 2024
| Party | Candidate | Votes | % |
|---|---|---|---|
| Democratic | Wendell Gilliard (incumbent) | 12,457 | 82.91 |
| Libertarian | Joe Jernigan | 2,510 | 16.71 |
| Write-in | | 58 | 0.39 |
| Total votes | | 15,025 | 100.00 |
| Democratic hold | | | |

=== District 112 ===
District 112 general election, 2024
| Party | Candidate | Votes | % |
|---|---|---|---|
| Republican | Joe Bustos (incumbent) | 16,905 | 61.04 |
| Democratic | Peter Brennan | 10,765 | 38.87 |
| Write-in | | 23 | 0.08 |
| Total votes | | 27,693 | 100.00 |
| Republican hold | | | |

=== District 113 ===
District 113 general election, 2024
| Party | Candidate | Votes | % |
|---|---|---|---|
| Democratic | Marvin R. Pendarvis | 9,373 | 97.28 |
| Write-in | | 262 | 2.72 |
| Total votes | | 9,635 | 100.00 |
| Democratic hold | | | |

=== District 114 ===
District 114 general election, 2024
| Party | Candidate | Votes | % |
|---|---|---|---|
| Republican | Gary Brewer (incumbent) | 15,892 | 61.11 |
| Democratic | Adrienne Lett | 10,082 | 38.77 |
| Write-in | | 30 | 0.12 |
| Total votes | | 26,004 | 100.00 |
| Republican hold | | | |

=== District 115 ===
District 115 general election, 2024
| Party | Candidate | Votes | % |
|---|---|---|---|
| Democratic | Spencer Wetmore (incumbent) | 13,627 | 51.89 |
| Republican | J. Warren Sloane | 12,623 | 48.07 |
| Write-in | | 11 | 0.04 |
| Total votes | | 26,261 | 100.00 |
| Democratic hold | | | |

=== District 116 ===
District 116 general election, 2024
| Party | Candidate | Votes | % |
|---|---|---|---|
| Republican | James Teeple | 12,576 | 51.18 |
| Democratic | Charlie Murray | 11,984 | 48.77 |
| Write-in | | 11 | 0.04 |
| Total votes | | 24,571 | 100.00 |
| Republican hold | | | |

=== District 117 ===
District 117 general election, 2024
| Party | Candidate | Votes | % |
|---|---|---|---|
| Republican | Jordan Pace (incumbent) | 16,281 | 97.90 |
| Write-in | | 349 | 2.10 |
| Total votes | | 16,630 | 100.00 |
| Republican hold | | | |

=== District 118 ===
District 118 general election, 2024
| Party | Candidate | Votes | % |
|---|---|---|---|
| Republican | Bill Herbkersman (incumbent) | 16,052 | 64.73 |
| Democratic | Charity Owens | 8,733 | 35.22 |
| Write-in | | 13 | 0.05 |
| Total votes | | 24,798 | 100.00 |
| Republican hold | | | |

=== District 119 ===
District 119 general election, 2024
| Party | Candidate | Votes | % |
|---|---|---|---|
| Democratic | Leon Stavrinakis (incumbent) | 13,280 | 55.14 |
| Republican | Brendan R. Magee | 10,775 | 44.74 |
| Write-in | | 28 | 0.12 |
| Total votes | | 24,083 | 100.00 |
| Democratic hold | | | |

=== District 120 ===
District 120 general election, 2024
| Party | Candidate | Votes | % |
|---|---|---|---|
| Republican | Weston J. Newton (incumbent) | 17,696 | 66.68 |
| Democratic | Kate Creech | 8,820 | 33.24 |
| Write-in | | 21 | 0.08 |
| Total votes | | 26,537 | 100.00 |
| Republican hold | | | |

=== District 121 ===
District 121 general election, 2024
| Party | Candidate | Votes | % |
|---|---|---|---|
| Democratic | Michael F. Rivers Sr. (incumbent) | 9,913 | 58.04 |
| Republican | Shelley Gay Yuhas | 7,149 | 41.86 |
| Write-in | | 18 | 0.11 |
| Total votes | | 17,080 | 100.00 |
| Democratic hold | | | |

=== District 122 ===
District 122 general election, 2024
| Party | Candidate | Votes | % |
|---|---|---|---|
| Republican | Bill Hager (incumbent) | 11,234 | 53.59 |
| Democratic | Audrey Hopkins Williams | 9,718 | 46.36 |
| Write-in | | 12 | 0.06 |
| Total votes | | 20,964 | 100.00 |
| Republican hold | | | |

=== District 123 ===
District 123 general election, 2024
| Party | Candidate | Votes | % |
|---|---|---|---|
| Republican | Jeff Bradley (incumbent) | 15,113 | 59.87 |
| Democratic | Lisette Cifaldi | 10,114 | 40.07 |
| Write-in | | 15 | 0.06 |
| Total votes | | 25,242 | 100.00 |
| Republican hold | | | |

=== District 124 ===
District 124 general election, 2024
| Party | Candidate | Votes | % |
|---|---|---|---|
| Republican | Shannon Erickson (incumbent) | 13,086 | 63.21 |
| Democratic | Melinda Henrickson | 7,589 | 36.66 |
| Write-in | | 26 | 0.13 |
| Total votes | | 20,701 | 100.00 |
| Republican hold | | | |

== See also ==
- 2024 United States state legislative elections
- 2024 South Carolina elections
- List of South Carolina state legislatures
