= South Carolina Freedom Caucus =

US ultra-conservative political group

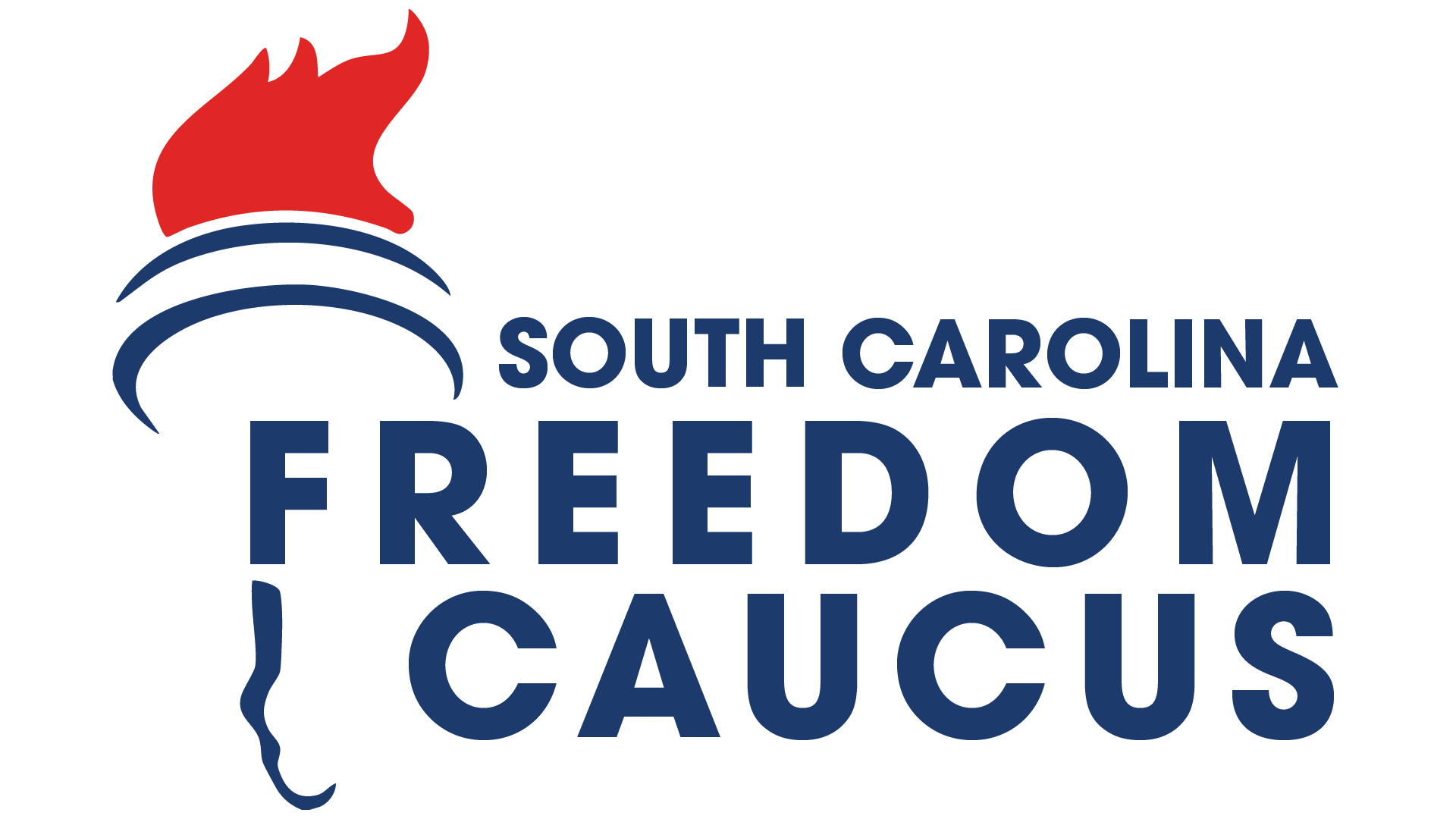
- Chair: Jordan Pace
- Vice Chair: April Cromer; Josiah Magnuson
- Founded: September 9, 2024; 22 months ago
- Ideology: Limited government; Right-wing populism; Trumpism
- Political position: Right-wing to far-right
- National affiliation: State Freedom Caucus Network
- Seats in the House Republican Conference: 17 / 89
- Seats in the House: 17 / 124

Website
- South Carolina Freedom Caucus

The South Carolina Freedom Caucus is a legislative caucus in the South Carolina General Assembly that promotes conservative policies, such as steep spending reductions and a social agenda critical of transgender health care, abortion, and LGBT+ initiatives. It is affiliated with the State Freedom Caucus Network. Its members all belong to the Republican Party, and are considered to be the most conservative bloc in the Assembly.

The Caucus has been accused of performative, obstructionist tactics, while supporters argue the Caucus is advancing conservative policies that have been ignored by the state's traditional conservatives.

== History ==
The Freedom Caucus was created in April 2022. As an initiative of the Conservative Partnership Institute, the State Freedom Caucus Network supported the creation of the South Carolina Freedom Caucus. Former U.S. Senator from South Carolina and Chairman of CPI, Jim DeMint, supported the effort. Andrew Roth, President of the State Freedom Caucus Network, said that Columbia (the state's capital city) "has a swamp" and that only a state Freedom Caucus could bring about conservative policies. It was the first caucus established by the Network.

In the primary elections leading up to the 2024 State House election, all Freedom Caucus members kept their seats, while others gained the party's nomination by defeating Republicans from the traditional House Republican Caucus, such as former Assistant Majority Leader Jay West. This primary was noted for the "aggressive" and "antagonistic" campaign materials sent to voters by both factions of the state Republican Party: the Freedom Caucus and the more moderate House Republican Caucus.

After the founding chairman, Adam Morgan, declined to seek re-election in 2024, Jordan Pace assumed the position in July 2024.

== Political positions and involvement ==
=== Intra-party relationship ===
The Freedom Caucus, especially in the State House, has a contentious relationship with its Republican colleagues in the House Republican Caucus. Many news outlets refer to the fighting as a "civil war". The Caucus accuses the majority Republican Caucus and its leadership of being "too slow" to advance conservative policies, like constitutional carry laws or stricter laws regulating abortion, and too willing to compromise with Democrats. DeMint decried the Republican Party for its members not living up to their campaign promises to pursue a traditionally conservative policy agenda. House Republicans in the majority caucus accuse the Freedom Caucus of bringing "Washington antics" to South Carolina and disrupting civil debate in favor of campaigning. Governor Henry McMaster backed mainstream Republicans over Freedom Caucus candidates in the 2024 State House election.

House Democrats, like Heather Bauer (D–Richland), have noted the policy and stylistic differences between Freedom Caucus and Republican Caucus members, calling the Freedom Caucus members "radical".

Near the end of the 2024–25 legislative session, the Caucus was criticized by House leadership for obstructing the passage of several key bills.

During the beginning of the 2025–26 legislative session, the House Freedom Caucus challenged incumbent House Speaker, Murrell Smith (R–Sumter), and nominated Bill Chumley (R–Spartanburg). All 17 members of the Caucus voted for Chumley, while 102 members of the House supported Murrell.

Candidates backed by the Freedom Caucus defeated opponents supported by the majority Republican caucus in several special election primaries in June 2025.

In the 2026, the Caucus endorsed and supported Representative Ralph Norman first in his bid to become governor, and later Senator.

=== Impeachment efforts ===
In February 2026, Pace introduced a bill that would have set the stage for the impeachment of Byron Gipson, a solicitor for Richland and Kershaw counties who serves as the chief criminal prosecutor in the region. Pace accused Gipson of wrongfully releasing a convicted murderer from prison, failing to communicate with the family of victims, and "mishandling . . . other criminal dispositions." Gipson refuted the allegations and claimed the effort sought to undermine "the independence of prosecutors".

The bill raised the novel question of whether the House has the authority to impeach solicitors, who are elected on the county-level. The Constitution of South Carolina empowers the House to impeach "officials elected on a statewide basis, state judges and such other state officers as may be designated by law.” The House Judiciary Committee voted along party lines to hire an outside attorney to answer this question, with Democrats opposing the move.

=== Lawsuit against the House Ethics Committee ===
Several Freedom Caucus members refused to sign a pledge prohibiting funding challenges against Republican incumbents, describing it as "soviet–style". State ethics laws prohibited ideologically based caucuses from funding political operations. In response, the Freedom Caucus filed suit against the House Legislative Ethics Committee in February 2023. The Caucus received legal counsel through America First Legal. The Caucus alleged the law violated the First Amendment by restricting speech on the basis of viewpoint. A federal judge ruled in favor of the Caucus, knocking down the prohibition. The House Ethics Committee chairman, Jay Jordan (R–Florence), said the ruling "blasted" the state's ethics law "wide open".

=== Education ===
In November 2022, the Caucus filed a lawsuit against Lexington School District One, accusing the District of violating state law by allowing an education nonprofit, EL Education, to train educators on how to infuse race into education. Caucus members released an audio tape allegedly capturing an EL Education employee telling teachers how to circumvent state law on teaching critical race theory. The CEO of EL Education said the Caucus was promoting a "false and crudely edited narrative". The District maintained it did not violate the law, but settled the lawsuit and ended its relationship with EL Education.

The Caucus supported efforts in 2025 to make school board races partisan, requiring candidates to identify with a political party.

In 2026, the Caucus led an effort to reject the appointment of Former South Carolina Chief Justice Don Beatty to the South Carolina State University's Board of Trustees. Pace said the Caucus took issue with Beatty's history serving as a Democrat in the state House, and his opposition to the state's abortion law during his time on the Supreme Court. Pace also criticized the House for not nominating those deemed conservative and reflective of "the population of the state."

=== 2024 budget debate ===
During the 2024–25 legislative session, the Freedom Caucus attempted to reduce the expense and scale of the state government by eliminating multiple state agencies and reducing the budget by $1 billion. The Caucus introduced 100 amendments during the debate, a move described as a "campaign ploy" by other Republican members. In the end, the $14 billion budget passed 99–13, with the Caucus members rescinding many of their amendments after nearly three dozen were rejected. The debate, largely between Freedom Caucus and members of the House Republican Caucus, was reported to be "harsh".

=== Abortion debate ===
In 2022, Caucus members supported a bill that would authorize the death penalty for women who received an abortion. Senate Majority Leader, Shane Massey (R–Edgefield), told reporters the bill would never pass the state Senate, calling the Freedom Caucus "rogues" on the issue of abortion. Similarly, Speaker Smith said he had no intention of taking up the bill and that he didn't want any abortion law to "criminalize women".

During the 2025–26 legislative session, Rep. John McCravy (R–Greenwood) introduced a bill that would ban abortion from conception, with no exceptions for rape, incest, or fetal anomalies. All Freedom Caucus members in the House co-sponsored the bill. The Caucus called for similar legislation in the wake of the 2024 State House election, in which the Republicans gained a supermajority in the chamber. Washington Post columinst Kathleen Parker called the effort an "Iran-like crackdown on women".

=== Election policies ===
==== Voter registration investigation ====
In May 2022, then-Chairman Adam Morgan accused the South Carolina Department of Health and Human Services of "illegally register[ing] non-citizens to vote" by sending them voter registration materials in the mail. At the request of Governor McMaster, the South Carolina Law Enforcement Division (SLED) investigated the matter, finding the form warned non-citizens against completing it, and required an attestation of citizenship. In response, Morgan questioned why non-citizens were receiving the form at all.

==== Closed primaries ====
In January 2026, the Caucus supported a bill that woud institute a closed primary system, requiring voters to register as either Republican or Democrat in order to vote in a party primary. McMaster opposed the bill and threatened to veto it should it reach his desk.

==== Redistricting ====
In the wake of Louisiana v. Callais, Caucus members and other South Carolina Republicans expressed renewed support for redrawing the state's congressional's map to eliminate the state's one democratic district. Pace and other Caucus members have long pushed back against concerns that a new map could backfire and expand democratic representation in the state's congressional delegation.

== Controversy and criticism ==
=== R.J. May arrest ===
In December 2024, Lexington Representative and Freedom Caucus co-founder, RJ May, was suspended from the Caucus amid an investigation surrounding his possession of child sexual abuse material. In May 2025, he was indicted on child sex abuse charges, and arrested a month later. Caucus Chair Jordan Pace condemned May, calling for his expulsion from the House and for "swift justice" for his victims. In September 2025, May pleaded guilty to the charges, and was later charged for failing to pay state income taxes.

In June 2025, Majority leader of the House Republicans David Hiott requested the House Legislative Ethics Committee investigate whether May "acted in a manner unbecoming of a Member of the South Carolina House of Representatives". During the investigation, outside attorneys for the Ethics Committee attempted to speak with five Caucus Members, three of which were reported to have refused a meeting. The three members, Stephan Frank, Jay Kilmartin, and Pace, said they'd only answer questions from Committee Members, rather than lawyers from an outside firm. Frank called the investigation "fake" and "payback" against the Caucus on the part of the majority Republican Caucus and its leaders, namely House Speaker Murrell Smith. Hiott said the investigation was to ensure May's action did not occur in the state House and that no other parties were involved.

In January 2026, May was sentenced to 17 1/2 years in prison, followed by twenty years of supervised release for the CSAM charges. Caucus member Ryan McCabe wrote a letter in support of May during his sentencing hearing.

==== Subsequent investigations ====
As part of the November 2025 ethics report, the Committee found that former Representative and Caucus Chairman Adam Morgan failed to pay for election materials and report services rendered by May's political consulting firm. He was charged with four ethics violations.

Morgan claimed to be unaware of the unpaid balance, saying other politicians were unaware they owed money to the same vendor and that he was "eager to correct" any reporting issues.

=== Legislative tactics ===
Members of both parties have criticized the Freedom Caucus for its "obstructionist" legislative tactics that often lead to extended debate, delayed votes, or derailment of the agenda. House Republican Caucus member Neal Collins called the tactics "amateur and immature". Their tactics, as seen in the 2024 budget battle, also include introducing an amendment and requiring a roll call vote, then posting the votes to social media. These votes have been called "gotcha votes" by non-Freedom Caucus Republicans.

== Membership ==
Membership to the Caucus is invitation-only.

=== Current members ===
- Jordan Pace (R–Goose Creek) – Chairman
- Thomas Beach (R–Pickens)
- Mike Burns (R–Greenville)
- Bill Chumley (R–Spartanburg)
- April Cromer (R–Anderson)
- Lee Gilreath (R–Anderson)
- Stephen Frank (R–Greenville)
- Patrick Haddon (R–Greenville)
- Rob Harris (R–Spartanburg)
- Jay Kilmartin (R–Lexington)
- Steven Long (R–Spartanburg)
- Josiah Magnuson (R–Spartanburg)
- Ryan McCabe (R–Lexington)
- Alan Morgan (R–Greenville)
- Melissa Oremus (R–Aiken)
- Joe White (R–Newberry)

=== Former members ===
- Adam Morgan (politician) (R–Taylors) – former Chairman
- RJ May (R–Lexington) – former vice-chairman; left in December 2024 amid ongoing investigations
- Bobby Cox (R–Greenville)
- Stewart Jones (R–Laurens)
- David O'Neal (R–York)
- Ashley Trantham (R–Greenville)
