= Same-sex marriage in South Carolina =

Same-sex marriage has been legal in South Carolina since a federal court order took effect on November 20, 2014. Following the 2014 ruling of the Fourth Circuit Court of Appeals in Bostic v. Schaefer, which found Virginia's ban on same-sex marriage unconstitutional and set precedent on every state in the circuit, one judge accepted marriage license applications from same-sex couples until the South Carolina Supreme Court, in response to a request by Attorney General Alan Wilson, ordered him to stop. The U.S. District Court for the District of South Carolina ruled the state's ban on same-sex marriage unconstitutional on November 12 in Condon v. Haley, with implementation of that decision stayed until noon on November 20. Another court ruling, Bradacs v. Haley, on November 18 had ordered the state to recognize same-sex marriages from other jurisdictions.

Previously, South Carolina had banned same-sex marriage both by statute since 1996 and in its State Constitution since 2007. Polling suggests that a majority of South Carolina residents support the legal recognition of same-sex marriage, with a 2024 Public Religion Research Institute poll showing that 54% of respondents supported same-sex marriage.

== Legal restrictions ==
=== Statutes ===
In 1996, the South Carolina House of Representatives, by a vote of 82 to 0, passed a statute defining marriage as "between one man and one woman". The South Carolina Senate later passed the bill on a voice vote, and Governor David Beasley signed it into law. South Carolina's statutory prohibition on same-sex marriage, though unenforceable, remains on the books and has not been explicitly repealed.

=== Constitutional amendment ===
On March 1, 2005, the House of Representatives approved Amendment 1, a constitutional amendment banning same-sex marriage and any "lawful domestic union", by a vote of 96 to 3. The Senate passed the amendment by a vote of 42 to 1 on April 13. South Carolina voters approved the amendment on November 7, 2006. Constitutional amendments in South Carolina need to be approved by two-thirds of each house of the General Assembly, approved by the people in an election, and then ratified again by a majority of each house of the Assembly. On January 25, 2007, the House of Representatives ratified the amendment 92 to 7, and the Senate voted 41–1 to ratify the amendment on February 27.

== Lawsuits ==
=== Bradacs v. Haley ===
On August 28, 2013, Tracie Goodwin and Katie Bradacs, who had married in the District of Columbia in April 2012 and were raising three children, filed a lawsuit, Bradacs v. Haley, in the U.S. District Court for the District of South Carolina, challenging the state statute and constitutional amendment that denied legal recognition to same-sex marriages established in other jurisdictions. The plaintiffs were a state highway patrol officer and a disabled veteran of the U.S. Air Force. They named Governor Nikki Haley and Attorney General Alan Wilson as defendants. The case was initially assigned to U.S. District Judge Joseph F. Anderson, but was reassigned to Judge J. Michelle Childs on October 18, 2013. On April 22, 2014, Judge Childs stayed proceedings in Bradacs until the Fourth Circuit Court of Appeals ruled on the Virginia case of Bostic v. Schaefer, but she allowed briefing to continue.

Bostic v. Schaefer was resolved in favor of same-sex marriage on October 6, 2014, with the decision of the U.S. Supreme Court not to hear an appeal in the case, leaving Bostic as binding precedent on federal courts in South Carolina. Attorney General Wilson announced the same day that he would continue to defend the state's same-sex marriage ban in Bradacs. Judge Childs then lifted the stay of proceedings in Bradacs, and the plaintiffs filed a motion for summary judgment on October 20. On November 18, Judge Childs issued a permanent injunction against enforcement of the same-sex marriage ban only to the extent that the state refused to recognize "valid marriages of same-sex couples entered into in other states or jurisdictions and otherwise meet the prerequisites for marriage in the State of South Carolina, except that they are of the same sex" or denied equal treatment to the same.

=== Condon v. Haley ===
Same-sex marriage in the United States

On October 8, 2014, Charleston County Probate Judge Irvin Condon, citing the ruling in Bostic, accepted a marriage license application presented by a lesbian couple, Colleen Condon and Nichols Bleckley, the first in the state. In other parts of the state, probate judges refused to accept marriage license applications pending a final decision in Bradacs. Attorney General Wilson filed Wilson v. Condon, requesting an emergency injunction from the South Carolina Supreme Court to halt the issuance of marriage licenses to same-sex couples. On October 9, the Supreme Court agreed to halt the issuance of licenses pending the resolution of Bradacs. Because a South Carolina couple cannot receive a marriage license until 24 hours after their marriage license application was accepted, no marriage licenses were issued to same-sex couples in South Carolina during this time. On October 15, 2014, citing Bostic, Condon and Bleckley, represented by Lambda Legal and SC Equality, filed suit in federal district court seeking the right to marry. The defendants included Governor Haley, Attorney General Wilson, and Judge Condon, the state judge who was enjoined from licensing same-sex marriages a week earlier by the South Carolina Supreme Court. On November 12, U.S. District Judge Richard Gergel ruled for the plaintiffs and stayed his decision until noon on November 20. He wrote:

This Court has carefully reviewed the language of South Carolina's constitutional and statutory ban on same-sex marriage and now finds that there is no meaningful distinction between the existing South Carolina provisions and those of Virginia declared unconstitutional in Bostic. […] The Court finds that Bostic controls the disposition of the issues before this Court and establishes, without question, the right of Plaintiffs to marry as same sex partners. […] Based upon the foregoing, the Court hereby declares that S.C. Code Ann. § 20-1-10(B)-(C), S.C. Code Ann. § 20-1-15 and S.C. Constitution Art XVII, § 15, to the extent they seek to prohibit the marriage of same sex couples who otherwise meet all other legal requirements for marriage in South Carolina, unconstitutionality infringe on the rights of Plaintiffs under the Due Process Clause and Equal Protection Clause of the Fourteenth Amendment of the United States Constitution and are invalid as a matter of law.

The Fourth Circuit Court of Appeals denied the state's request for a stay pending appeal or a temporary stay on November 18. Attorney General Wilson asked Chief Justice John Roberts, as Circuit Justice for the Fourth Circuit, for an emergency stay pending appeal later that day. He made an argument other states in similar cases had not made to the Supreme Court, that the principle of federalism known as the "domestic relations exception"—which restricts the role of federal courts in certain areas reserved to the states—required clarification. Justice Roberts referred the request to the full court, which denied it on November 20, with Justices Antonin Scalia and Clarence Thomas dissenting. On the morning of November 19, 2014, Judge Condon began to issue marriage licenses to those who had applied prior to the South Carolina Supreme Court's order. Kayla Bennett and Kristin Anderson held their marriage ceremony outside of the Charleston County Probate Court, marking the state's first licensed same-sex marriage. Some probate courts began processing marriage license applications for same-sex couples on November 19, and more of them on November 20. Lexington County Probate Judge Daniel Eckstrom announced on November 20 that his county would continue to deny marriage licenses to same-sex couples until ordered to do so or "until this matter [was] conclusively resolved". The county reversed itself that same day and began to issue marriage licenses.

On December 1, Wilson asked the Fourth Circuit to suspend proceedings in Condon pending U.S. Supreme Court action on writs of certiorari on other same-sex marriage cases from the Sixth Circuit Court of Appeals. He told the court that he would also be submitting a request for certiorari before judgment in Condon, and that the other parties to this case did not object to his request. On December 16, the Fourth Circuit consolidated Bradacs and Condon as Bleckley v. Wilson and put proceedings on hold pending action by the U.S. Supreme Court on certiorari petitions. On June 26, 2015, the U.S. Supreme Court ruled in Obergefell v. Hodges that same-sex couples have a fundamental right to marry under the Due Process and Equal Protection clauses of the Fourteenth Amendment. The decision legalized same-sex marriage nationwide in the United States. In August 2015, Judge Gergel ordered Wilson in his official capacity as Attorney General to pay more than $134,000 in attorney's fees to the plaintiffs who successfully challenged the state's ban on same-sex marriage.

=== Swicegood v. Thompson ===
On March 13, 2014, Cathy Swicegood filed for divorce from Polly Thompson in a state trial court, alleging that they were common-law married. Swicegood and Thompson had been together for 13 years, shared a home, bank accounts and other property, and Swicegood was also covered under Thompson's health insurance plan. The lawsuit asked that a judge officially recognize Swicegood's union with Thompson and order that their joint property be equitably divided. Thompson filed a motion to dismiss for lack of subject-matter jurisdiction because the parties were not married and lacked the capacity to marry at the time. A family court dismissed Swicegood's action on May 7, 2014, ruling that a common-law marriage between two persons of the same sex was not legally possible according to state statutes. Swicegood appealed. In an unpublished opinion, the South Carolina Court of Appeals later remanded the case back to the family court with instructions to "consider the implications of Obergefell on its subject-matter jurisdiction". The family court ruled upon remand that the couple could not have formed a common-law marriage because the state's same-sex marriage ban was in place throughout the couple's 13 years together. The Court of Appeals affirmed the lower court's decision upon appeal on July 1, 2020, determining that South Carolina prohibited same-sex couples from "forming the requisite intent to be married at common-law" prior to the November 2014 decision in Condon. On November 10, 2021, the South Carolina Supreme Court, basing its reasoning on Obergefell, which held that state same-sex marriage bans were void ab initio, dispensed with briefing and vacated the provision of the Court of Appeals' opinion that same-sex couples could not form common-law marriages prior to November 2014. However, because Swicegood did not hold herself out as married during the times she lived with Thompson, the Supreme Court upheld the finding that no common-law marriage existed. South Carolina prospectively abolished common-law marriage in 2019 in Stone v. Thompson.

== Developments after legalization ==
In January 2016, a group of five Republican lawmakers and one Democrat introduced the South Carolina Natural Marriage Defense Act to the General Assembly. (Note: The bill's sponsors were Bill Chumley, Mike Burns, Richie Yow, Lonnie Hosey, Garry R. Smith, and Dennis Moss.) The bill sought to prohibit state officials from marrying same-sex couples and require the Attorney General to defend any official who is sued or ordered by a federal judge to issue marriage licenses to same-sex couples. It died at the end of the legislative session in June 2016. A similar bill was introduced and subsequently defeated in Tennessee that same year. On February 15, 2018, six Republican lawmakers introduced the Marriage and Constitution Restoration Act to the General Assembly. (Note: The bill's sponsors were Steven Wayne Long, Bill Chumley, Mike Burns, John R. McCravy III, and Josiah Magnuson. Representative Rick Martin was removed as a sponsor on February 22.) The bill died without any legislative action on May 10, 2018, when the Assembly adjourned sine die. Had the bill been approved, it would have defined marriage as a "union between a man and a woman", declared all same-sex marriages "parody marriages" and prohibited the state from recognizing such "parody marriages". The bill would have thus been in violation of Obergefell, the 2015 Supreme Court ruling that same-sex couples have a constitutional right to marry.

During an October 2022 gubernatorial debate, Governor Henry McMaster said that he would enforce a same-sex marriage ban in South Carolina if the U.S. Supreme Court were to overturn Obergefell, despite the majority of South Carolinians supporting same-sex marriage according to polling. In April 2026, a group of Republican lawmakers introduced a motion calling on the Supreme Court to overturn Obergefell. The executive director of the state American Civil Liberties Union (ACLU) called out the resolution, "Lawmakers in South Carolina cannot undo marriage for all committed couples in this country. These lawmakers are fringe extremists." Two representatives, Melissa Lackey Oremus and Mark Willis, later asked to be removed as sponsors of the legislation, which was eventually not voted on before the General Assembly adjourned sine die in May. The measure was likely to encounter significant civil opposition if passed, as the majority of state voters support the legal recognition of same-sex marriage according to polling.

== Native American nations ==
The Indian Civil Rights Act primarily aims to protect the rights of Native Americans but also reinforces the principle of tribal self-governance. While it does not grant sovereignty, the Act affirms the authority of tribes to govern their own legal affairs. Consequently, many tribes have enacted their own marriage and family laws. As a result, the Condon ruling and the Supreme Court's Obergefell ruling did not automatically apply to tribal jurisdictions. There is only one federally recognized tribe in South Carolina: the Catawba Nation. It is unclear if same-sex marriage is legal on the reservation as tribal officials have not publicly commented on the issue.

Native Americans have deep-rooted marriage traditions, placing a strong emphasis on community, family and spiritual connections. Catawba marriage customs forbade first-cousin marriages, and most marriages were monogamous, matrilineal and matrilocal. In courtship, the man approached the woman's parents to ask permission to marry their daughter, though the woman's consent was also required. Chiefs (yé mirαhé) occasionally practiced polygyny. While there are no records of same-sex marriages being performed in Native American cultures in the way they are commonly defined in Western legal systems, many Indigenous communities recognize identities and relationships that may be placed on the LGBT spectrum. Among these are two-spirit individuals—people who embody both masculine and feminine qualities. In some cultures, two-spirit individuals assigned male at birth wear women's clothing and engage in household and artistic work associated with the feminine sphere. Historically, this identity sometimes allowed for unions between two people of the same biological sex. In the case of the Catawba, a lot of traditional knowledge was lost in the aftermath of colonization, and so there is no strong evidence that that their culture recognized an institutionalised two-spirit status. A literal translation of the term "two-spirit" in the Catawba language would be hįnda nąpαri.

== Demographics and marriage statistics ==
Data from the 2000 U.S. census showed that 7,609 same-sex couples were living in South Carolina. By 2005, this had increased to 10,563 couples, likely attributed to same-sex couples' growing willingness to disclose their partnerships on government surveys. Same-sex couples lived in all counties of the state and constituted 1.1% of coupled households and 0.6% of all households in the state. Most couples lived in Charleston, Greenville and Richland counties, but the counties with the highest percentage of same-sex couples were Allendale (0.79% of all county households) and Calhoun (0.73%). Same-sex partners in South Carolina were on average younger than opposite-sex partners, and more likely to be employed. However, the average and median household incomes of same-sex couples were lower than different-sex couples, and same-sex couples were also far less likely to own a home than opposite-sex partners. 21% of same-sex couples in South Carolina were raising children under the age of 18, with an estimated 3,370 children living in households headed by same-sex couples in 2005.

Richland County, home to the state capital of Columbia, had issued 422 marriage licenses to same-sex couples by June 26, 2016, one year after the Obergefell decision. In that same time period, Charleston County, South Carolina's third-most populous county, had issued 387 licenses to same-sex couples.

The 2020 U.S. census showed that there were 7,810 married same-sex couple households (3,159 male couples and 4,651 female couples) and 6,565 unmarried same-sex couple households in South Carolina.

== Public opinion ==
Public opinion for same-sex marriage in South Carolina
Poll source	Dates administered	Sample size	Margin of error	Support	Opposition	Do not know / refused
Public Religion Research Institute	February 28 – December 8, 2025	320 adults	?	56%	41%	3%
Public Religion Research Institute	March 13 – December 2, 2024	350 adults	?	54%	43%	3%
Public Religion Research Institute	March 9 – December 7, 2023	316 adults	?	52%	45%	3%
Public Religion Research Institute	March 11 – December 14, 2022	?	?	55%	40%	5%
Public Religion Research Institute	March 8 – November 9, 2021	?	?	50%	48%	2%
Public Religion Research Institute	January 7 – December 20, 2020	944 adults	?	53%	42%	5%
Public Religion Research Institute	April 5 – December 23, 2017	1,116 adults	?	53%	37%	10%
Public Religion Research Institute	May 18, 2016 – January 10, 2017	1,636 adults	?	44%	45%	11%
Public Religion Research Institute	April 29, 2015 – January 7, 2016	1,327 adults	?	40%	49%	11%
Public Religion Research Institute	April 2, 2014 – January 4, 2015	837 adults	?	39%	54%	7%
Winthrop University	February 21 – March 1, 2015	1,109 adults	± 3.0%	43%	53%	4%
Winthrop University	October 19–27, 2013	887 adults	± 3.3%	39%	52%	9%
Public Policy Polling	December 7–9, 2012	520 voters	± 4.3%	27%	62%	11%
Public Policy Polling	August 25–28, 2011	587 voters	± 4.0%	21%	69%	10%

The August 2011 Public Policy Polling (PPP) survey found that 21% of South Carolina voters thought same-sex marriage should be legal, while 69% thought it should be illegal and 10% were not sure. A separate question on the same survey found that 48% of voters supported the legal recognition of same-sex couples, with 19% supporting same-sex marriage, 29% supporting civil unions but not marriage, 51% favoring no legal recognition and 1% being undecided. The December 2012 PPP survey found that 27% of South Carolina voters thought same-sex marriage should be legal, while 62% thought it should be illegal and 11% were not sure. A separate question on the same survey found that 54% of voters supported the legal recognition of same-sex couples, with 25% supporting same-sex marriage, 29% supporting civil unions but not marriage, 43% favoring no legal recognition and 3% being undecided.

== See also ==
- LGBT rights in South Carolina
- Same-sex marriage in the United States
- Politics of South Carolina
