= Sam Rivers =

Sam Rivers may refer to:

- Sam Rivers (jazz musician) (1923–2011), American jazz saxophonist and composer
- Sam Rivers (bassist) (1977–2025), bassist and backing vocalist of the band Limp Bizkit

== See also ==
- Samuel Rivers Jr. (born 1970), American politician
