= Lin Bennett =

American politician

Member of the South Carolina House of Representatives from the 114th district
- In office November 14, 2016 – November 14, 2022
- Preceded by: Mary Tinkler
- Succeeded by: Gary Brewer

Personal details
- Born: February 9, 1954 (age 72) Wassertrüdingen, Germany
- Party: Republican
- Education: University of Maryland; Essex Community College

Linda Bennett (born February 9, 1954) is an American politician. She is a former member of the South Carolina House of Representatives from the 114th District, serving from 2016 to 2022. She is a member of the Republican Party.

In March 2019, Bennett caused controversy after she posted a misleading photo of Democratic congressman Joe Cunningham (SC-01) on social media. That same month, Will Sommer of The Daily Beast reported that Bennett had endorsed and made numerous Facebook posts about the far-right QAnon conspiracy theory.

== Electoral history ==
South Carolina House of Representatives District 114
Year	Candidate	Votes	Pct	Candidate	Votes	Pct	Candidate	Votes	Pct	Candidate	Votes	Pct
2016 General Election	Lin Bennett	11,576	60.7%	Bob Aubin	7,487	39.3%						
2018 General Election	Lin Bennett (i)	8,619	52.5%	Dan Jones	7,153	43.6%	Melissa Couture	633	3.9%	Others/Write-in	6	0.0%
