= JA Moore (politician) =

American politician

Member of the South Carolina House of Representatives from the 15th district
- Incumbent
- Assumed office November 12, 2018
- Preceded by: Samuel Rivers Jr.

Personal details
- Born: Orangeburg, South Carolina, U.S.
- Party: Democratic
- Children: 1 child, Mariah Rae
- Parent(s): Ernestine S. and James Alexander Moore, Sr.
- Education: Johnson and Wales University, Culinary Arts Degree, 2005
- Occupation: Politician, chef, business owner

JA Moore is an American politician. He is a member of the South Carolina House of Representatives from the 15th District (Berkeley & Charleston Counties), serving since 2018. He is a member of the Democratic Party.

== Political career ==
Moore is 1st Vice Chair of the Interstate Cooperation Committee, and a member of the Medical, Military, Public and Municipal Affairs Committee. When Moore won his seat in 2018, he became the first Democrat to represent South Carolina's 15th District. He cites affordable housing, gun control, reproductive rights, veteran's rights, and clean water as his key political goals.

In February 2020, Moore endorsed Democrat Pete Buttigieg for the presidency of the United States. In August 2020, he endorsed Senator Kamala Harris for Vice President, and Jaime Harrison for the U.S. Senate.

On June 19, 2023, Moore announced his intention to run for the South Carolina Senate District 42 seat, vacated by Marlon Kimpson after his appointment to a role in the Biden administration. The seat would be decided in a special election in 2023. The Democratic primary took place on September 5, and the special election on November 7. Other candidates in the primary were Democrats SC Rep. Wendell Gilliard and SC Rep. Deon Tedder. In Democratic primary results, Moore was bested by Gilliard and Tedder.

== Electoral history ==
=== 2018 South Carolina House of Representatives ===
Moore was the only Democrat to run in 2018, so there was no Democratic primary.

South Carolina House of Representatives District 15 General Election, 2018
Party	Candidate	Votes	%
Democratic	JA Moore	4,818	52.4
Republican	Samuel Rivers Jr. (incumbent)	4,372	47.5
Other	Write-in	9	0.1
Total votes		9,199	100.0
Democratic gain from Republican			

=== 2020 South Carolina House of Representatives ===
Both candidates advanced unopposed to the general election. This contest is a rematch of the District 15 House of Representatives race from 2018.

South Carolina House of Representatives District 15 General Election, 2020
Party	Candidate	Votes	%
Democratic	JA Moore (incumbent)	7,573	51.8
Republican	Samuel Rivers Jr.	7,027	48.1
Other	Write-in	17	0.1
Total votes		14,617	100.0
Democratic hold			

=== 2022 South Carolina House of Representatives ===
Both candidates advanced unopposed to the general election.

South Carolina House of Representatives District 15 General Election, 2022
Party	Candidate	Votes	%
Democratic	JA Moore (incumbent)	4,326	56.8
Republican	Latrecia Pond	3,276	43.0
Other	Write-in	10	0.1
Total votes		7,612	100.0
Democratic hold			

== Personal life ==
Moore was born in Orangeburg and currently resides in Hanahan. He attended Johnson & Wales University, graduating with a culinary arts degree.
