= Bill Whitmire =

American politician

Member of the South Carolina House of Representatives from the 1st district
- Incumbent
- Assumed office November 11, 2002
- Preceded by: Gresham Barrett

Personal details
- Born: William Ramsey Whitmire; August 24, 1948 (age 78) Seneca, South Carolina, United States
- Party: Republican
- Spouse: Kathy Lynn Pittard (m. 1972)
- Children: 3
- Education: Piedmont College (AB)
- Occupation: Educator; farmer; politician

Military service
- Branch/service: United States Army; Army Reserve
- Years of service: 1971‍–‍1977

William Ramsey Whitmire (born August 24, 1948) is an American politician. He is a member of the South Carolina House of Representatives from the 1st District (parts of Oconee & Pickens Counties), serving since 2003. He is a member of the Republican Party.

== Early life and education ==
Whitmire was born on August 24, 1948, to Ramsey and Marie Fagan Whitmire. He graduated from in 1972 Piedmont College with an A.B.

== Occupation ==
Whitmire is a retired educator in the School District of Oconee County. He was also a member of the United States Army Reserves from 1971 to 1977. He owns S&W Farms.

== Political career ==
=== City of Walhalla ===
Whitemire began his political career in Walhalla, serving on the Walhalla City Council and then as Mayor of Walhalla from 2000 to 2002.

=== 1st House District of South Carolina ===
As of 2024, Whitmire serves as Chair of the College and University Trustee Screening Commission, a Joint Committee with members from the House and Senate.

==== 2003 ====
In 2003, he would be elected to the 1st House District of South Carolina, representing ports of Oconee and Pickens Counties.

==== 2016 ====
In 2016, he ran uncontested for his seat.

==== 2022 ====
Due to his role as Chair of the College and University Trustee Screening Commission, Whitmire led the Commission in 2022 when it debated firing the entire board of trustees for the University of South Carolina. What started out during a meeting to review five board members, frustration at the mishandling of athletic funds and the resignation of the president of the University became a question of redesigning the board structure altogether. Ultimately, the effort failed to pass before the end of the legislative session.

==== 2023 ====
In 2023, Whitmire sponsored no legislation. However, he and State Senator Thomas C. Alexander worked to get a $5.6M grant for Walhalla to build a community center placed in the 2023-24 South Carolina state budget signed into law by Governor Henry McMaster.

He is a supporter of fetal heartbeat-based abortion prohibition, voting for the Fetal Heartbeat Act in 2022 and 2023.

==== 2024 ====
See also: 2024 South Carolina elections, 2024 state legislature elections in the United States, South Carolina House of Representatives elections, 2024 South Carolina House of Representatives election

In March 2024, Whitmire filed for re-election.

== Personal life ==
Whitmire is married to Kathy Lynn Pittard. They have 3 children.
