= LGBTQ rights in South Carolina =

- South Carolina (US)
- Legal status: Legal since 2003 (Lawrence v. Texas)
- Gender identity: Altering sex on birth certificate does not require sex reassignment surgery
- Discrimination protections: None statewide except in employment June 15, 2020

Family rights
- Recognition of relationships: Same-sex marriage since 2014
- Adoption: Same-sex couples allowed to adopt

Lesbian, gay, bisexual, transgender, and queer (LGBTQ) people in the U.S. state of South Carolina may face some legal challenges not experienced by non-LGBTQ residents. Same-sex sexual activity is legal in South Carolina as a result of the U.S. Supreme Court decision in Lawrence v. Texas, although the state legislature has not repealed its sodomy laws. Same-sex couples and families headed by same-sex couples are eligible for all of the protections available to opposite-sex married couples. However, discrimination on the basis of sexual orientation and gender identity is not banned statewide.

In February 2017, South Carolina voters elected their first openly gay lawmaker to the South Carolina House of Representatives. Jason Elliott represents the 22nd District (which includes part of Greenville) and is a member of the Republican Party.

== Legality of same-sex sexual activity ==
South Carolina's sodomy laws, which made "buggery" a felony punishable by five years in prison or a $500 fine, were invalidated by the 2003 U.S. Supreme Court decision in Lawrence v. Texas.

== Recognition of same-sex relationships ==
South Carolina voters adopted a constitutional amendment in November 2006 defining marriage as the union of a man and a woman and prohibited the recognition of same-sex relationships under any other name. On November 12, 2014, U.S. District Judge Richard Gergel ruled for the plaintiffs in the case of Condon v. Haley and stayed his decision to overturn the state's constitutional ban on same-sex marriage until noon on November 20. The Fourth Circuit Court of Appeals denied the state's request for a stay pending appeal or a temporary stay on November 18. Attorney General Alan Wilson asked Chief Justice John Roberts, as Circuit Justice for the Fourth Circuit, for an emergency stay pending appeal later that day. It made an argument other states in similar cases had not made to the Supreme Court, that the principle of federalism known as the "domestic relations exception" –which restricts the role of federal courts in certain areas reserved to the states– requires clarification. Justice Roberts referred the request to the full court, which denied it with Justices Scalia and Thomas dissenting on November 20. The first same-sex marriage took place in South Carolina on November 19, 2014 and marriage licences were accepted the next day as the state began to recognize and perform other same-sex marriages.

== Adoption and parenting ==
South Carolina permits adoption by individuals. There are no explicit prohibitions on adoption by same-sex couples or on stepchild adoptions. Children's birth certificates are automatically listed with the names of the parents. Prior to 2017, in order for a birth certificate to be legally changed to include two same-sex individuals as the parents of a child, assuming one of the two individuals is the biological parent, South Carolina's department responsible for birth certificates required one of two legal certifications:

- A certificate of adoption by which the non-biological parent completes a stepchild adoption of the child; or
- An order of a South Carolina Family Court finding that the two individuals are the legal parents of the child and directing the department to list the individuals as the parents on the birth record.

On 15 February 2017, a federal judge ordered the Government of South Carolina to list both same-sex parents on their children's birth certificates. A married same-sex couple filed a lawsuit, alleging a violation of their Due Process and Equal Protection rights under the 14th Amendment as interpreted in Obergefell v. Hodges, after the state refused to list the non-biological mother on their twins' birth certificates. U.S. District Judge Mary Geiger Lewis ruled that "listing a birth mother's spouse as her child’s second parent is one of the terms and conditions of civil marriage in South Carolina." South Carolina's Department of Health and Environmental Control previously insisted that it would only issue birth certificates listing both same-sex spouses as parents if those couples obtained an adoption or court order, something not required of married different-sex couples.

== Discrimination protections ==
Map of South Carolina counties and cities that have sexual orientation and/or gender identity anti–employment discrimination ordinances Sexual orientation and gender identity with anti–employment discrimination ordinance Sexual orientation with anti–employment discrimination ordinance Sexual orientation and gender identity solely in public employment Does not protect sexual orientation and gender identity in employment

No provision of South Carolina's anti-discrimination law explicitly addresses discrimination on the basis of sexual orientation or gender identity. However, in 2020, a federal law was expanded to protect LGBT discrimination in the workplace, which extends to all 50 US states, including South Carolina.

Mount Pleasant, Myrtle Beach, and Richland County prohibit discrimination on the basis of sexual orientation and gender identity in employment. Other cities, including Columbia, Charleston and Latta, prohibit such discrimination but for city employees only. The coastal city of Folly Beach prohibits discrimination based on sexual orientation, but not gender identity.

=== Domestic violence law ===
South Carolina is the only state in the United States to not include same-sex couples in domestic violence statutes. The legislation only explicitly includes opposite-sex couples.

=== Hate crime law ===
South Carolina does not have a hate crime law. Hate crimes motivated by sexual orientation and/or gender identity, however, are banned federally under the Matthew Shepard and James Byrd Jr. Hate Crimes Prevention Act.

== Gender identity and expression ==
Changing one's legal gender on the birth certificate does not require sex reassignment surgery.

In April 2016, after North Carolina passed a law restricting transgender people's access to public bathrooms and a similar bill was introduced to the South Carolina Legislature, Governor Nikki Haley said she opposes such a law and views it as "unnecessary".

In May 2024, a bill passed the South Carolina Legislature and signed into law by the Governor of South Carolina implementing a ban on gender-affirming healthcare for individuals under 18 years old, and a ban on federal funding going directly or indirectly towards gender affirming care for adults. The legislation went into effect immediately making South Carolina the 25th US state to implement a ban on such care under 18. In response to this law, a number of healthcare providers, including the Medical University of South Carolina stopped providing gender affirming care regardless of age.

South Carolina's 2024–25 and 2025–26 budget appropriations bills enacted laws that require students to use bathrooms based on their sex "at the time of birth". A trans student, known in court only as John Doe, sued. On September 10, 2025, the U.S. Supreme Court allowed him to continue using the boys' bathroom in school while his lawsuit against South Carolina state law proceeds. However, all other trans students in South Carolina must follow state law.

=== Sports ===
On May 17, 2022, The South Carolina governor signed the transgender sports ban.

== No promo-homo law ==
In March 2020, a federal judge declared an archaic 1988 law "banning homosexual or gay topics within school classrooms" unconstitutional. This law is very similar to the UK section 28 law, which has been repealed.

== Public opinion ==
A 2017 Public Religion Research Institute (PRRI) opinion poll found that 53% of South Carolina residents supported same-sex marriage, while 37% opposed it and 10% were unsure. Additionally, 67% supported an anti-discrimination law covering sexual orientation and gender identity. 26% were opposed.

== Summary table ==
Same-sex sexual activity legal	Yes (Since 2003 under Lawrence v. Texas ruling; not codified into law yet)
Equal age of consent (16)	Yes
Anti-Discrimination laws in Employment	Yes (Since 2020 under Bostock v. Clayton County ruling)
Anti-Discrimination laws in Housing	No
Anti-Discrimination laws in Public Accommodations	No
Anti-Discrimination laws in the provision of goods and services	No
Same-sex marriages	Yes (Since 2015 under Obergefell v. Hodges ruling)
Recognition of same-sex couples	Yes
Stepchild adoption by same-sex couples	Yes
Joint adoption by same-sex couples	Yes
Domestic Violence laws inclusive of same-sex couples	No (Only state in the US to have such gendered language in its domestic violence laws)
Lesbian, gay and bisexual people allowed to serve openly in the military	Yes (Since 2011)
Transgender people allowed to serve openly in the military	No (Banned since 2025)
Transvestites allowed to serve openly in the military	No
Intersex people allowed to serve openly in the military	/ Yes (Current DoD policy bans "Hermaphrodites" from serving or enlisting in the military)
Right to change legal gender	Yes (Requires court order but not sex reassignment surgery)
Access to IVF for lesbians	Yes
Automatic parenthood on birth certificates for children of same-sex couples	Yes
Gay and trans panic defense banned	X
Conversion therapy banned on minors	X
Third gender option	X
Commercial surrogacy for gay male couples	Yes
MSMs allowed to donate blood	Yes / No (3 month deferral period; federal policy)

== See also ==
- Same-sex marriage in South Carolina
- LGBT rights in the United States
- SC Equality
