= Jackie Terribile =

American politician

Member of the South Carolina House of Representatives from the 66th district
- Incumbent
- Assumed office January 2025
- Preceded by: David O'Neal
- Succeeded by: Heather Hart (elect)

Personal details
- Party: Republican
- Education: University at Albany, SUNY
- Website: https://www.jackieforsc.com/

Jackie Terribile is an American politician. She is a member of the South Carolina House of Representatives from the 66th District, serving since 2024. She is a member of the Republican party.

== Political career ==
Terribile is a member of the South Carolina Freedom Caucus. She defeated school board member Michele Branning to win the Republican primary.

Terribile had no opposition in the general election.

Terribile serves on the House Education and Public Works committee.

Terribile represented the Sixteenth Judicial Circuit on the South Carolina State Board of Education.

Terribile was the founding chair of Moms for Liberty York County from August 2021-December 2023.
