= Joe Ellis Brown =

American schoolteacher and politician (1933–2018)

Member of the South Carolina House of Representatives from the 73rd district
- In office 1986–2006
- Succeeded by: Christopher R. Hart

Personal details
- Born: May 24, 1933 Anderson County, South Carolina
- Died: January 7, 2018 (aged 84)
- Party: Democratic
- Spouse: Dorothy Henderson (m. 1956–2018)
- Children: 4
- Education: Allen University; South Carolina State University
- Profession: schoolteacher

Joe Ellis Brown (May 24, 1933 – January 7, 2018) was an American schoolteacher and politician.

Born in Anderson County, South Carolina, to Prue Ellis and Elouise Grant-Brown, he played football at Allen University and obtained a master's degree at South Carolina State University. He was named principal of Hopkins High School in 1957. Richland County School District One later made Brown principal of Hopkins Junior High, until he retired in 1985. A Democrat, Brown was a member of the South Carolina House of Representatives for district 73 from 1986 to 2006.
