= Wendell Gilliard =

American politician (born 1954)

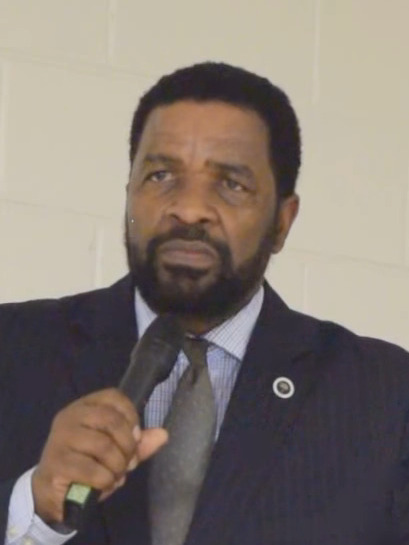
- Gilliard in 2018

Member of the South Carolina House of Representatives from the 111th district
- Incumbent
- Assumed office January 2009
- Preceded by: Floyd Breeland

Personal details
- Born: July 1, 1954 (age 72) Charleston, South Carolina, U.S.
- Party: Democratic
- Children: 3
- Education: DeVry University (attended)

Wendell G. Gilliard (born July 1, 1954) is an American politician, steelworker, and union official. A Democrat, Gilliard serves as a member of the South Carolina House of Representatives, representing the 111th District (parts of Charleston County).

== Early life ==
Gilliard was born in Charleston, South Carolina. His father came from Marion, South Carolina, and worked at the Charleston Air Force Base. He has five siblings. Gilliard's mother died of an aneurysm when he was five years old.

Gilliard grew up on the East Side of Charleston before moving to West Ashley at the age of seven. He attended Burke High School and Rivers High School, graduating from Rivers in 1973. He then attended Bell and Howell School of Technology (now known as DeVry University). He also attended the United Steelworkers of America program which was held on the campus of Tennessee State University.

== Career ==
Gilliard left Bell & Howell after three years to work in a retail store owned by his brother. When the store closed due to declining sales in 1981, Gilliard began to work as a plant operator for Mobil Chemical. He later worked for Rhodia. In 1982, Gilliard was elected vice president of Local 863 of the United Steelworkers. He later became its president.

== Political career ==
=== Municipal Career ===
==== 1998 ====
- Gillard was elected a Charleston City Councilman in 1998.

==== 1999 ====
- In 1999, he sponsored non-binding legislation that labeled the Ku Klux Klan as a terrorist organization.

==== 2002 ====
- He was unopposed in his bid for a second term in 2002.

==== 2003 ====
- In 2003, Gilliard walked out of a city council meeting after Herb Silverman, an atheist, gave an invocation.
- While serving as a city councilman, Gilliard levied a charge of unsafe working conditions against Rhodia, and was fired.
- He also rallied against a porn shop and for modesty laws in Marion Square.

=== South Carolina House of Representatives ===
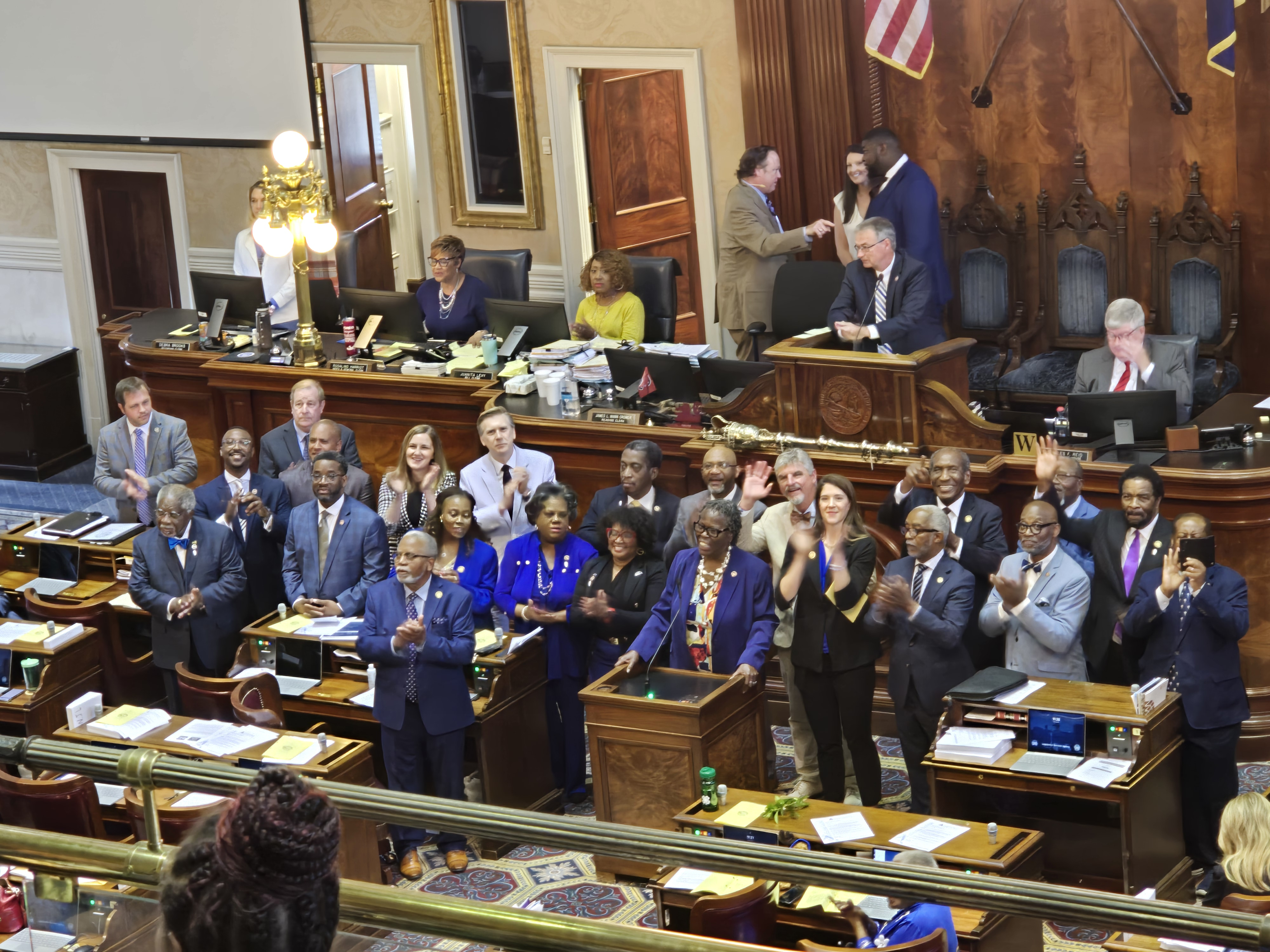
Gilliard (second from right) with members of the House of Representatives, 2025.

==== 2008 ====
- In 2008, Gilliard ran for the South Carolina House of Representatives in the 111th district. There was no Democratic primary, and he had no opposition in the general election.

==== 2015 ====
- In 2015, Gilliard became more well known due to his involvement in hate crime legislation following the Killing of Walter Scott in North Charleston and the Charleston church massacre at Emanuel African Methodist Episcopal Church.
- Similarly, he supported efforts that year to remove the Confederate flag from the State Capitol grounds.

==== 2021 ====
- In 2021, Gilliard proposed legislation that would allow for jailing hotel owners and landlords who fail to inform residents of past and present bed bug infestations. His legislation proposed 60 days jail time or fines of up to $300.

==== 2023 ====
- Upon hearing of the Titan submersible implosion, he informed the public of his profound sadness mixed with gratitude for the US Military. He implored Governor Henry McMaster to fly the flags at half-staff to honor those who died.
- In August 2023, Gilliard reacted to the Charleston County Park and Recreation Commission's decision to remove "no concealable weapons allowed" signs from Charleston area parks, controversially stating, "[w]hether they circumvented the law or not, it was with good intentions, nothing is wrong with that."
- In October 2023, when a Moms for Liberty-backed ouster succeeded in removing the first black Superintendent for the Charleston County School District, Gilliard accused the decision of being racially motivated and called for the Attorney General of South Carolina to investigate if discrimination-based state laws had been violated.

==== 2024 ====
- In 2024, Gilliard renewed the push to make the Clementa C. Pinckney Hate Crimes Bill into state law. This is the same legislation proposed in the wake the Charleston church massacre at Emanuel African Methodist Episcopal Church. While it has previously passed the house, as of January 2024, it has never passed the South Carolina Senate.
- On March 28, 2024, Gilliard was in a serious car crash in Lexington County and was subsequently rushed to the hospital.
- In 2024, Gilliard was among the state legislators appointed to serve on the Robert Smalls Monument Commission.

=== 2013 US House of Representatives Special Election ===
See 2013 United States House of Representatives elections

See 2013 South Carolina's 1st congressional district special election

Gilliard contemplated running in the special election for South Carolina's 1st congressional district, which became vacant when Governor Nikki Haley appointed Representative Tim Scott to fill the United States Senate seat held by retiring Jim DeMint. Gilliard ultimate decided against the run.

=== 2023 State Senate Election ===
See: 2023 United States state legislative elections

On March 13, 2023, Gilliard announced his intention to run for the South Carolina Senate District 42 seat, vacated by Marlon Kimpson after his appointment to a role in the Biden administration. The seat was decided in a special election in 2023. Endorsements that Gilliard received in his race for the Senate seat include Our Revolution, a group affiliated with US Senator Bernie Sanders, and Local 1442 of the International Longshoremen's Association. He was also endorsed by Bakari Sellers.

The Democratic Primary took place on September 5, and the special election took place on November 7. Other candidates in the race were Democrats SC Rep. JA Moore and SC Rep. Deon Tedder, and Republican Rosa Kay. In the Democratic Primary unofficial results, Moore was bested by Gilliard and Tedder, who went on to a September 19 runoff. Gilliard led the evening with close to 47% of the vote.

On September 19, Tedder led the runoff by 11 votes, triggering a recount. The recount was conducted and results certified by the Charleston County Board of Canvassers and the Dorchester County Voter Registration and Elections Office on September 21; later that day Tedder was declared the winner by the South Carolina State Election Commission.

=== Office of the Mayor of Charleston, South Carolina ===
On December 15, 2023, Charleston, South Carolina Mayor-Elect William S. Cogswell Jr., announced his appointment of senior staff. Gilliard was named special advisor, quality of life and community outreach. He has stated his intentions to draw an annual salary for this position with the city while running for reelection in 2024.

== Personal life ==
Gilliard has three children, two sons and one daughter. He is divorced.
