= Tiffany Spann-Wilder =

Member, South Carolina House of Representatives

Member of the South Carolina House of Representatives from the 109th district
- Incumbent
- Assumed office April 9, 2024
- Preceded by: Deon Tedder

Personal details
- Party: Democratic
- Children: 2
- Education: University of South Carolina School of Law
- Profession: Attorney

Tiffany Spann-Wilder is an American attorney, former County Magistrate, and politician serving as a Democratic member of the South Carolina House of Representatives.

== Early life ==
After studying at the University of South Carolina School of Law, Spann-Wilder clerked for Judge Matthew J. Perry and worked for the Department of Justice.

== Political career ==
2024 special election

Spann-Wilder is the member of the South Carolina House of Representatives representing District 109. In a 2024 special election for the seat, Spann-Wilder defeated Eduardo Curry II in the Democratic Primary.

Spann-Wilder was sworn into office in April 2024, as she was unopposed in the general election. She filled the unexpired term of Deon Tedder. Tedder won his race for the South Carolina Senate District 42 seat, vacated by Marlon Kimpson after Kimpson's appointment to a role in the Biden Administration.

2024 South Carolina House of Representatives election

In 2024 Spann-Wilder filed for a full term in the South Carolina House of Representatives. Jessica Bright, daughter of South Carolina Senator Margie Bright-Matthews, also filed to run in the Democratic primary.

In late May, it was announced that Bright had withdrawn from the race. Spann-Wilder, unopposed in the Democratic Primary and facing no opposition in the general election, is expected to be elected to a full term in November.
