= Floyd Breeland =

American politician (1933–2020)

Member of the South Carolina House of Representatives from the 111th district
- In office November 9, 1992 – November 10, 2008
- Preceded by: Danny Martin
- Succeeded by: Wendell Gilliard

Personal details
- Born: August 5, 1933 St. George, South Carolina
- Died: August 11, 2020 (aged 87) Charleston, South Carolina
- Party: Democratic

Floyd Breeland (August 5, 1933 – August 11, 2020) was an American politician who served in the South Carolina House of Representatives from the 111th district from 1992 to 2008.

== Early life and education ==
Breeland was born in St. George, South Carolina and graduated from Williams Memorial High School. He served in the United States Army. He received his bachelor's degree from Allen University in 1955 and his masters of science degree in secondary school education from Indiana University Bloomington in 1967.

== Career ==
He was a high school teacher and principal.

He died on August 11, 2020, in Charleston, South Carolina at age 87.
