= Gary Brewer (politician) =

American politician

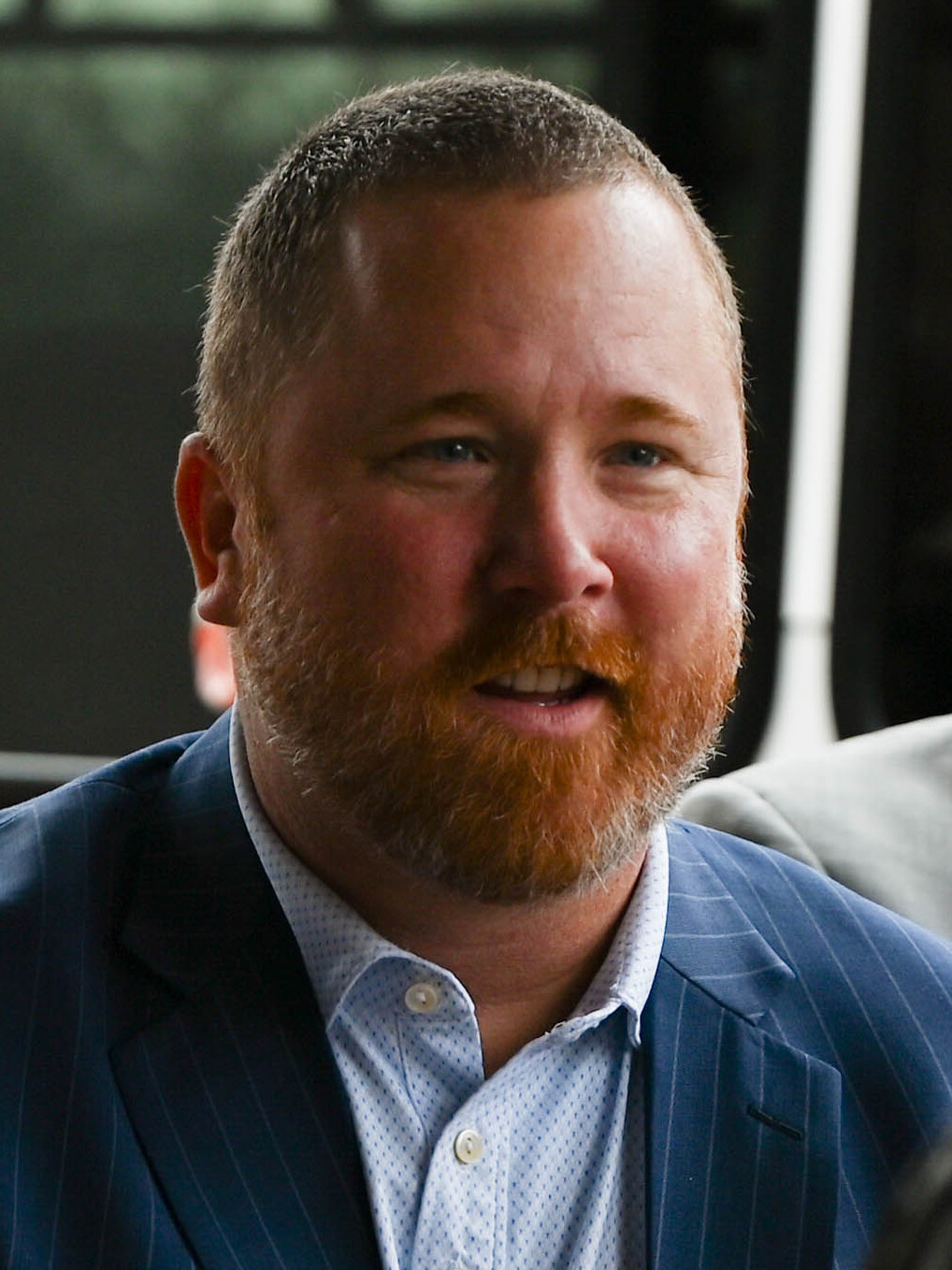
- Brewer in 2024

Member of the South Carolina House of Representatives from the 114th district
- Incumbent
- Assumed office November 14, 2022
- Preceded by: Lin Bennett

Personal details
- Born: Summerville, South Carolina
- Party: Republican
- Spouse: Kelsi Childress
- Education: The Citadel

Gary S. Brewer Jr. is an American Republican from South Carolina. Since 2022, he has been a member of the South Carolina House of Representative for the 114th district (parts of Charleston and Dorchester Counties).

Brewer is a businessman in the construction industry.
