= Todd Rutherford =

American politician (born 1970)

Minority Leader of the South Carolina House of Representatives
- Incumbent
- Assumed office January 8, 2013
- Preceded by: Harry L. Ott Jr.

Member of the South Carolina House of Representatives from the 74th district
- Incumbent
- Assumed office November 9, 1998
- Preceded by: Alma W. Byrd

Personal details
- Born: James Todd Rutherford; October 10, 1970 (age 56) Columbia, South Carolina, U.S.
- Party: Democratic
- Spouses: Naida Harris (m. 2008; div. 2017); Megan Pinckney (m. 2020)
- Children: 2
- Education: Howard University (BA); University of South Carolina, Columbia (JD)

James Todd Rutherford (born October 10, 1970 in Columbia, South Carolina) is an American politician and Democratic member of the South Carolina House of Representatives, representing the 74th District since 1999. He is the Minority Leader of the House.

== Early life and education ==
Rutherford graduated from W.J. Keenan High School in 1988. Rutherford earned his bachelor's degree from Howard University in 1992. He then worked as Legislative Assistant to Congressman Robin Tallon before earning his Juris Doctor degree from the University of South Carolina School of Law in 1996.

== Legal work ==
After passing the bar, Rutherford worked as Assistant Solicitor and Special Prosecutor of Narcotic and Drug Cases in the Fifth Circuit Solicitor's Office. In 1998, he founded the Rutherford Law Firm.

See Trial of Alex Murdaugh

In April 2023 Rutherford and Mark Moore became the new legal team for South Carolina banker Russell Laffitte, who faced state charges after his conviction as a co-conspirator with Alex Murdaugh in federal financial crimes. The State trial has been deferred until 2024.

== South Carolina General Assembly ==
Rutherford was elected to the South Carolina General Assembly in 1998 to represent House District 74. He initially served on the Military, Medical and Municipal Affairs Committee before joining the Judiciary Committee in 2002. Rutherford currently serves on the Ways and Means Committee and the Ethics Committee.

Rutherford was named Young Democrat of the year in 1999.

In 2007 Rutherford introduced a bill to replace the Confederate battle flag with the South Carolina state flag. However, the bill never received a hearing. In June 2015 the flag was removed with the overwhelming support of the House Democratic Caucus.

Rutherford is a leading proponent of medical marijuana in the South Carolina General Assembly. In 2014, Rutherford filed the "Put Patients First Act," the first of its kind in South Carolina.

Rutherford joined House members Deon Tedder and Roger Kirby in forming the Freedom Caucus of South Carolina, in contrast to the conservative SC Freedom Caucus.

In 2013, Rutherford was elected Minority Leader. In 2024 he faced a challenge from Kambrell Garvin, but was re-elected.

== Electoral history ==
=== 2016 South Carolina House of Representatives ===
2016 South Carolina House of Representatives District 74 election
Party	Candidate	Votes	%
Democratic	Todd Rutherford	12,174	98.9%
Write-in		131	1.1%
Total votes		12,305	100.0%

=== 2018 South Carolina House of Representatives ===
2018 South Carolina House of Representatives District 74 election
Party	Candidate	Votes	%
Democratic	Todd Rutherford	9,681	90.0%
Independent	Michael L. Block	1,018	9.5%
Write-in		52	0.48%
Total votes		10,751	100.0%

=== 2020 South Carolina House of Representatives ===
2020 South Carolina House of Representatives District 74 election
Party	Candidate	Votes	%
Democratic	Todd Rutherford	12,328	82.8%
Republican	Vimalkumar Jariwala	2,526	17.0%
Write-in		33	0.22%
Total votes		14,887	100.0%

=== 2022 South Carolina House of Representatives ===
2022 South Carolina House of Representatives District 74 election
Party	Candidate	Votes	%
Democratic	Todd Rutherford	9,089	98.6%
Write-in		129	1.4%
Total votes		9,218	100.0%

=== 2024 South Carolina House of Representatives ===
2024 South Carolina House of Representatives District 74 election
Party	Candidate	Votes	%
Democratic	Todd Rutherford	12,303	98.4%
Write-in		197	1.6%
Total votes		12,500	100.0%

South Carolina House of Representatives
Preceded by Harry L. Ott Jr.	Minority Leader of the South Carolina House of Representatives; 2013–present	Incumbent
