= Deon Tedder =

American politician (born 1990)

Member of the South Carolina Senate from the 42nd district
- Incumbent
- Assumed office January 9, 2024
- Preceded by: Marlon Kimpson

Member of the South Carolina House of Representatives from the 109th district
- In office November 9, 2020 – January 9, 2024
- Preceded by: David Mack
- Succeeded by: Tiffany Spann-Wilder

Personal details
- Born: April 26, 1990 (age 36) Durham, North Carolina, U.S.
- Party: Democratic
- Education: South Carolina State University (B.A.); University of South Carolina School of Law (J.D.)
- Profession: Attorney

Deon T. Tedder is an American attorney and politician. He is a member of the Democratic party.

== Political career ==
Tedder is a member of the South Carolina Senate representing District 42. Tedder serves on the Senate Judiciary, Fish Game and Forestry, Family and Veterans' Services, Corrections and Penology and Medical Affairs Committees.

=== 2020 House of Representatives Election ===
In June 2020, Tedder defeated Jeff Wilder in the Democratic Primary and James Johnson in the Primary runoff. He defeated Libertarian Rodney Travis in the general election and became a member of the South Carolina House of Representatives representing District 109 until 2024.

He served on the House Education and Public Works Committee and the Operations and Management Committee and as Treasurer of the South Carolina Legislative Black Caucus.

Tedder had a bill passed supporting historically Black colleges and universities (HBCUs), and supported clean energy and electric vehicle technology. He opposed a bail reform bill, which he said would create 'a violation of due process'.

Tedder joined House members Todd Rutherford and Roger Kirby in forming the Freedom Caucus of South Carolina, in contrast to the conservative SC Freedom Caucus.

=== 2023 State Senate Election ===
On March 12, 2023, Tedder announced his intention to run for the South Carolina Senate District 42 seat, vacated by Marlon Kimpson after Kimpson's appointment to a role in the Biden Administration. The seat would be decided in a special election in 2023. Endorsements that Tedder received in his race for the Senate seat included Conservation Voters of South Carolina and former South Carolina District 42 Senator Marlon Kimpson.

The Democratic primary took place on September 5. Other candidates in the primary were State Representatives JA Moore and Wendell Gilliard. Moore was bested by Gilliard and Tedder, who faced each other in a primary runoff.

On September 19, Tedder, who had been endorsed by SC Congressman Jim Clyburn, led the runoff by 11 votes, triggering a recount. The recount was conducted and results certified by the Charleston County Board of Canvassers and the Dorchester County Voter Registration and Elections Office on September 21; later that day Tedder was declared the winner by the South Carolina State Election Commission.

Tedder won against Republican Rosa Kay in a special election held on November 7, 2023. He is currently the youngest member of the South Carolina Senate.

=== 2024 State Senate Election ===
In March 2024 Tedder filed for re-election to the South Carolina Senate. He faced challenger Kim Greene in the Democratic Primary. Tedder defeated Greene and went on unopposed to retain his Senate seat.
