= Chris R. Hart =

American politician

Christopher Richard Hart

Member of the South Carolina House of Representatives from the 73rd district
- Incumbent
- Assumed office 2007
- Preceded by: Joe Ellis Brown

Personal details
- Born: September 22, 1972 (age 54) Columbia, South Carolina, US
- Party: Democratic
- Education: Howard University; University of South Carolina
- Profession: Attorney

Christopher Hart is a Democratic member of the South Carolina House of Representatives, serving since 2007. Hart served in the Army National Guard from 1989 to 1998.
