= Patrick Haddon =

American politician (born 1977)

Member of the South Carolina House of Representatives from the 19th district
- Incumbent
- Assumed office 2019
- Preceded by: Dwight Loftis

Personal details
- Born: September 15, 1977 (age 48) Greenwood, South Carolina, U.S.
- Party: Republican

Patrick B. Haddon (born September 15, 1977) is an American politician. He is a member of the South Carolina House of Representatives from the 19th District, serving since 2019. He is a member of the Republican party.

Haddon is a member of the South Carolina Freedom Caucus. He is Chair of the House Operations and Management Committee, and 1st Vice Chair of the House Agriculture, Natural Resources & Environmental Affairs Committee.

In 2023, Haddon was briefly among the Republican co-sponsors of the South Carolina Prenatal Equal Protection Act of 2023, which would make women who had abortions eligible for the death penalty; he later withdrew his sponsorship.

In 2024, Haddon was among the state legislators appointed to serve on the Robert Smalls Monument Commission.
