= David O'Neal =

American politician

Member of the South Carolina House of Representatives from the 66th district
- Incumbent
- Assumed office November 2022
- Preceded by: Gilda Cobb-Hunter
- Succeeded by: Jackie Terribile

Personal details
- Party: Republican

David L. O'Neal (born 17 September 1957) is an American politician and retired military officer.

== Early life, education and career ==
O'Neal was born in Lake Charles, Louisiana, to parents Clarence and Marie Mariani O'Neal on 17 September 1957. He completed his first bachelor's degree from Texas Christian University in 1982. He returned to school after retiring from the military, earning a second bachelor's degree in 2012 and his master's degree in 2013, both from Winthrop University.

O'Neal served in the United States Army, retiring with the rank of lieutenant colonel.

== Political career ==
In the 2000s, O'Neal moved to Tega Cay, South Carolina where he was elected to the city council in 2015, and mayor in 2017. As he held municipal political office, O'Neal also served as district director for U. S. Representative Ralph Norman.

In 2022, O'Neal filed for South Carolina House District 66, an open seat due to redistricting. He won election to the South Carolina House of Representatives as a Republican Party candidate, defeating Democratic Party nominee Carla Litrenta.

O'Neal, a former member of the South Carolina Freedom Caucus, did not seek re-election in 2024.
