= April Cromer =

American politician

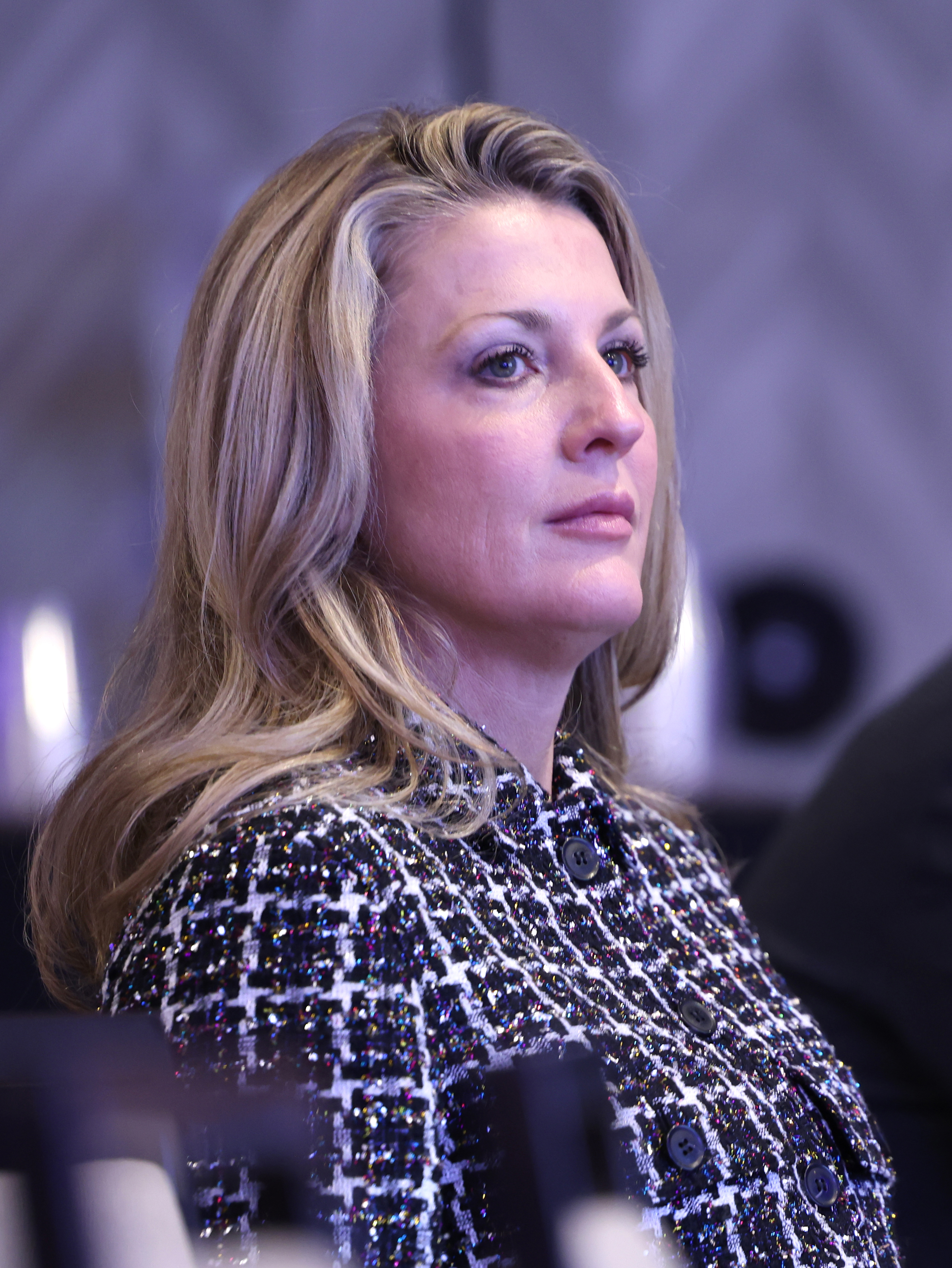
- Cromer in 2024

Member of the South Carolina House of Representatives from the 6th district
- Incumbent
- Assumed office November 14, 2022
- Preceded by: Brian White

Personal details
- Born: August 28, 1976 (age 49) Anderson, South Carolina, U.S.
- Party: Republican
- Spouse: Brent Cromer (m. 1999)

April Cromer is an American politician of the Republican Party. She is the member of the South Carolina House of Representatives representing District 6. Cromer won the 2022 general election for South Carolina House of Representatives District 6 after she defeated Republican incumbent W. Brian White, who had been a member of the South Carolina House since 2001, in the June primary. She won in the general election on November 8, 2022. Cromer is a member of the South Carolina Freedom Caucus.
