= Samuel Rivers Jr. =

American politician

Member of the South Carolina House of Representatives from the 15th district
- In office 2012–2018
- Succeeded by: JA Moore

Personal details
- Born: February 23, 1970 (age 56)
- Party: Republican

Samuel Rivers Jr. (born February 23, 1970) is an American politician. He was a member of the South Carolina House of Representatives from the 15th District, serving from 2012 to 2018. He is a member of the Republican party. On June 4, 2016 allegations that Samuel Rivers Jr. had engaged in an illegal act of coercion surfaced on social media. Images of alleged text messages between Samuel Rivers Jr. and another political office seeker seem to support the claim. Rivers is currently being investigated by the South Carolina Law Enforcement Division.
