= Neal Collins (politician) =

American politician

Neal Anthony Collins
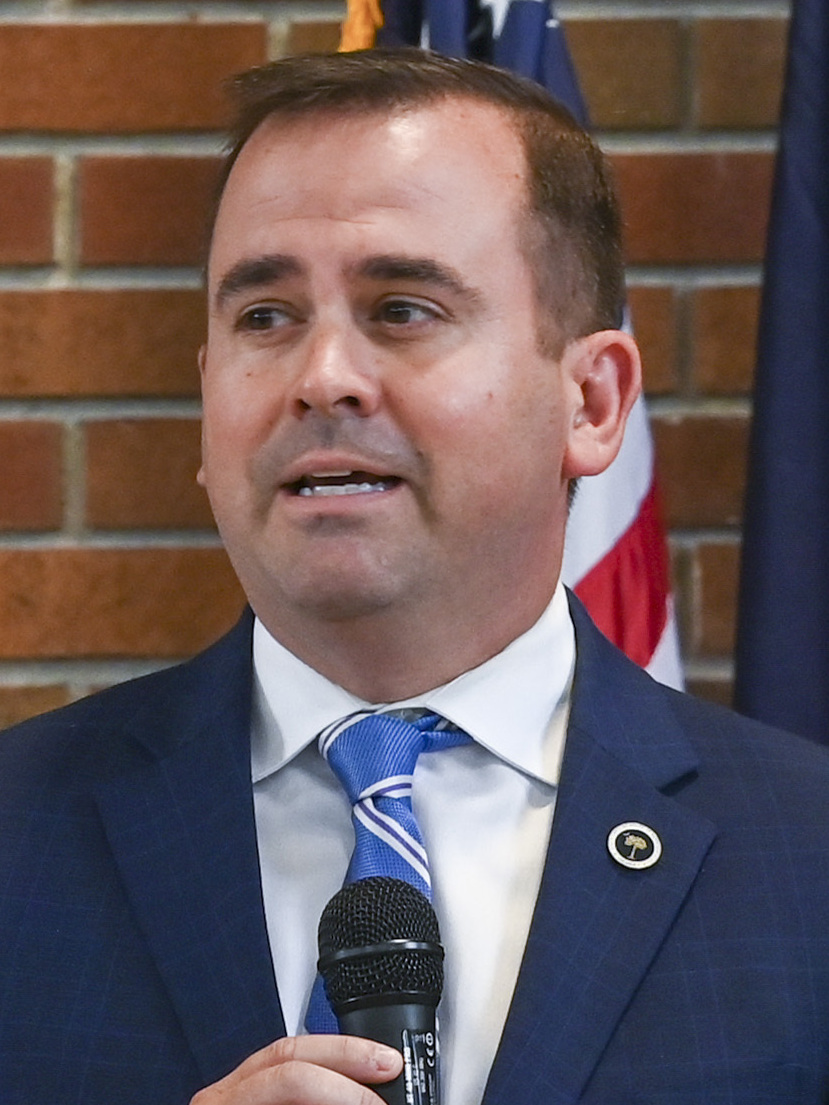

Member of the South Carolina House of Representatives from the 5th district
- Incumbent
- Assumed office November 10, 2014
- Preceded by: Phil Owens

Personal details
- Born: Neal Anthony Collins; July 6, 1982 (age 44) Easley, South Carolina, U.S.
- Party: Republican
- Education: Furman University (BA); Harvard University (ALM); University of South Carolina School of Law (JD)
- Occupation: Attorney

Neal Collins (born July 6, 1982) is a Republican member of the South Carolina House of Representatives, representing the 5th district. He was first elected in 2014, and re-elected in every subsequent election. In 2010, he was one of several candidates running for the open seat of 3rd congressional district of South Carolina in the House of Representatives, which was held by J. Gresham Barrett, but left to compete in the 2010 South Carolina gubernatorial election.

== Early life and education ==
Neal Collins was born in Easley, South Carolina in Pickens County. Collins attended Furman University and graduated in 2004 with a double major in Political Science and French. Collins later earned a Juris Doctor from the University of South Carolina School of Law in 2007. He has passed both the North Carolina and South Carolina bars. He has been in private practice for over sixteen years. Currently, he works for The Hendricks Law Firm practicing general law with a focus on family law in South Carolina. In 2020, he received a Masters in Liberal Arts from Harvard Extension School.

== Political career ==
=== 2010 Congressional Candidacy ===
Collins announced his candidacy on July 4, 2009, in Easley in front of Merrell's Pizzeria. Collins made numerous appearances at public gatherings, debates, and radio interviews as well as working tirelessly going door-to-door in the 3rd district of South Carolina which consists of nine counties (Abbeville, Anderson, Edgefield, Greenwood, Laurens, McCormick, Oconee, Pickens, and Saluda) and a part of a tenth (Aiken County). Collins' emphasis on a back-to-basics approach to government under his platform "Responsibility, Recovery, Reform" includes such ideals as limited government, lower taxes, accountability of government, and elimination of nepotism. Collins lost the election after receiving 8.2% of the vote.

=== 2014 SC House District #5 ===
Collins announced his candidacy on March 19, 2014, in Easley, South Carolina after the retirement of state Representative Phil Owens. He won the primary with a majority of the vote, defeating Rick Tate and Harley Taton by a wide margin. In the general election, he won without opposition.

=== South Carolina House of Representatives ===
In the 2016 legislative session, Collins proposed a bill that would strengthen the penalties for killing police dogs and horses. He also co-authored a bill on moped law reform.

Collins was one of only 18 state representatives to vote against the 2017 transportation bill, which would raise South Carolina's gas tax, and have the State Secretary of Transportation be chosen by the Transportation Commission. He instead proposed an amendment which would have allowed the governor to appoint the Secretary of Transportation.

=== 2016 SC House District #5 ===
Collins faced a primary challenge from Rick Tate, who he had defeated in 2014. Collins won the primary, and faced no opposition in the general election.

==== 2016 presidential endorsements ====
Collins was an early supporter of Marco Rubio's 2016 presidential campaign, and was his campaign co-chair in South Carolina. In the general election, Collins criticized Republican nominee Donald Trump, and said he would either vote for independent Evan McMullin or leave that part of the ballot blank.

=== 2018 SC House District #5 ===
Collins filed for re-election and faced primary opposition from Allan Quinn and David Cox. Collins and Quinn advanced to a runoff. Neal won the runoff election with 57.6% of votes.

=== 2020 SC House District #5 ===
Collins filed for re-election and faced primary opposition from Allan Quinn and David Cox for the consecutive primary elections. Collins and Quinn advanced to a runoff. Neal won the runoff election with 52.8 percent of the vote.

=== 2022 SC House District #5 ===
Collins filed for re-election and faced primary opposition from Clay Hamlett and Dennis Bo Roberts. Neal avoided a runoff election with 50.1% of votes in that election.

=== 2024 SC House District #5 ===
Collins filed for re-election, and faced a primary challenge from Brandy Tarleton. Neal won the primary election with 55.1% of votes.
