= Josiah Magnuson =

American politician (born 1991)

Member of the South Carolina House of Representatives from the 38th district
- Incumbent
- Assumed office November 14, 2016

Personal details
- Born: August 17, 1991 (age 34) Greenville, South Carolina, US
- Party: Republican

Josiah Magnuson (born August 17, 1991) is a member of the South Carolina House of Representatives from the 38th district, serving since 2016. He is a member of the Republican Party.

== Politics ==
In 2019, during debate on a heartbeat bill, Nancy Mace, one of Magnuson's Republican colleagues in the South Carolina House, argued in favor of adding a rape and incest exception to the bill, and related her own experience of having been raped at age 16. Magnuson later distributed a series of postcards to each desk in the House that stated in part, “It is a twisted logic that would kill the unborn child for the misdeed of the parent.”

In 2021 Magnuson was elected as the Secretary of the South Carolina Freedom Caucus. He also serves as 2nd Vice Chair of the House Agriculture, Natural Resources & Environmental Affairs Committee, and is a member of the House Legislative Oversight Committee.

== Electoral history ==
South Carolina House of Representatives, District 38 General Election, 2022
Party	Candidate	Votes	%
Republican	Josiah Magnuson (incumbent)	12,875	98.40%
Republican	Other/Write-in votes	215	1.60%
Total votes		13,090	100.00%

South Carolina House of Representatives, District 38 General Election, 2020
Party	Candidate	Votes	%
Republican	Josiah Magnuson (incumbent)	18,526	97.60%
Republican	Other/Write-in votes	461	2.40%
Total votes		18,987	100.00%

South Carolina House of Representatives, District 38 General Election, 2018
Party	Candidate	Votes	%
Republican	Josiah Magnuson (incumbent)	11,106	98.00%
Republican	Other/Write-in votes	222	2.00%
Total votes		11,328	100.00%

South Carolina House of Representatives District 38 Republican primary, 2018
Party	Candidate	Votes	%
Republican	Josiah Magnuson (incumbent)	3,078	69.00%
Republican	Joan Clyborne	1,381	31.00%
Total votes		4,459	100.00%

South Carolina House of Representatives, District 38 General Election, 2016
Party	Candidate	Votes	%
Republican	Josiah Magnuson (unopposed)	13,956	100.00%
Total votes		13,956	100.00%

South Carolina House of Representatives District 38 Republican primary, 2016
Party	Candidate	Votes	%
Republican	Josiah Magnuson	2,034	57.67%
Republican	Doug Brannon (incumbent)	1,493	42.33%
Total votes		3,527	100.00%
