= Marlon Kimpson =

American politician and attorney

Member of the South Carolina Senate from the 42nd district
- In office October 7, 2013 – May 11, 2023
- Preceded by: Robert Ford
- Succeeded by: Deon Tedder

Personal details
- Born: April 15, 1969 (age 57) Columbia, South Carolina, U.S.
- Party: Democratic
- Children: 2
- Education: Morehouse College (BA); University of South Carolina (JD)

Marlon E. Kimpson (born April 15, 1969) is an American politician and attorney. He served in the South Carolina Senate from 2013 to 2023. He served as a member of the Advisory Committee for Trade Policy and Negotiations in the Office of the United States Trade Representative during the presidency of Joe Biden.

== Early life and education ==
Kimpson attended Morehouse College, graduating in 1991, and the University of South Carolina School of Law, graduating in 1999. He is a lawyer at Motley Rice.

== Political career ==
Kimpson won a special election to succeed Robert Ford in 2013 representing the 42nd district in the South Carolina Senate. In 2023 he was actively working to pass a hate crime law in South Carolina.

In January 2020, Kimpson announced his support for the Joe Biden presidential campaign in the competition for the Democratic presidential nomination. Kimpson was selected as one of seventeen speakers to jointly deliver the keynote address at the 2020 Democratic National Convention.

On March 10, 2023, President Biden published his intent to appoint Kimpson and thirteen others to the Advisory Committee for Trade Policy and Negotiations, a committee established by the Office of the US Trade Representative, part of the Executive Office of the President. Kimpson announced that he would vacate his South Carolina Senate seat later in 2023 to take up the appointment.

Kimpson attended the 2024 Democratic National Convention as a Sixth Congressional District delegate.

Party political offices
Preceded by Elizabeth Warren	Keynote Speaker of the Democratic National Convention; 2020; Served alongside: Stacey Abrams, Raumesh Akbari, Colin Allred, Brendan Boyle, Yvanna Cancela, Kathleen Clyde, Nikki Fried, Robert Garcia, Malcolm Kenyatta, Conor Lamb, Mari Manoogian, Victoria Neave, Jonathan Nez, Sam Park, Denny Ruprecht, Randall Woodfin	Succeeded by Angela Alsobrooks
