= Melissa Lackey Oremus =

American politician

Member of the South Carolina House of Representatives from the 84th district
- Incumbent
- Assumed office 2019
- Preceded by: Ronnie Young

Personal details
- Born: November 17, 1978 (age 47) Aiken, South Carolina, United States
- Party: Republican
- Education: University of South Carolina Aiken (B.S.); Southern Wesleyan University (M.S.M.)

Melissa Lackey Oremus (born November 17, 1978) is an American politician. She is a member of the South Carolina House of Representatives from the 84th District, serving since 2019. She is a member of the Republican party. She also serves on the House Labor, Commerce and Industry Committee.

== Electoral history ==
South Carolina House of Representatives District 84
Year	Candidate	Votes	Pct	Candidate	Votes	Pct	Candidate	Votes	Pct	Candidate	Votes	Pct
2019 Special Republican Primary (Note: The top four candidates of six are listed here.)	Melissa Lackey Oremus	699	30.9%	Alvin Padgett	528	23.4%	Cody Anderson	460	20.4%	Danny Feagin	432	19.1%
2019 Special Republican Primary Runoff	Melissa Lackey Oremus	1,178	56.3%	Alvin Padgett	915	43.7%						
2019 Special General Election	Melissa Lackey Oremus	809	97.4%	Others/Write-in	22	2.6%						
