= Steven Wayne Long =

American politician

Member of the South Carolina House of Representatives from the 37th district
- Incumbent
- Assumed office November 14, 2016
- Preceded by: Donna Hicks

Personal details
- Born: April 14, 1994 (age 32) Greenville, South Carolina, U.S.
- Party: Republican
- Education: Spartanburg Community College (AA); University of South Carolina Upstate (BA)

Steven Wayne Long (born April 14, 1994) is an American politician. He is a member of the South Carolina House of Representatives from the 37th District, serving since 2016. He is a member of the Republican Party.

== Politics ==
Long sponsored the South Carolina Prenatal Equal Protection Act of 2023. The bill would have introduced new legal definitions regarding abortions and miscarriages. It would have also introduced new legal penalties for procuring an elective abortion by classifying them within the framework of assaults and homicides, This would have made women who had abortions judged medically unnecessary eligible for the death penalty. The bill attracted 21 Republican co-sponsors.
