= 2026 South Carolina House of Representatives election =

- November 3, 2026

All 124 seats in the South Carolina House of Representatives 62 seats needed for a majority
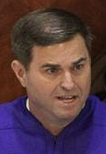

	Majority party	Minority party
Leader	Murrell Smith	Todd Rutherford
Party	Republican	Democratic
Leader since	May 12, 2022	January 8, 2013
Leader's seat	67th	74th
Last election	88	36
Seats before	89 (Note: Lucas Atkinson switched parties.)	35
Seats after	79	45
Seat change	▼10	▲10
- Republican hold Republican gain Democratic hold Democratic gain
Speaker before election
Murrell Smith
Republican
Elected Speaker
TBD

The 2026 South Carolina House of Representatives election was held on November 3, 2026, alongside the other 2026 United States elections. Voters elected members of the South Carolina House of Representatives in all 124 of the U.S. state of South Carolina's legislative districts to serve a two-year term. The primary elections took place on June 9, and in races where no candidate received over 50% in a primary, runoff elections took place on June 23.

Democrats filed for all 124 House districts, the first time in decades that the party contested all seats in the House. This election is the first time in which Democrats made net gains since 2008.

== Retirements ==
The following incumbent representatives did not file for re-election in 2026:

=== Republicans ===
1. District 4: Davey Hiott
2. District 86: Bill Taylor
3. District 96: Ryan McCabe
4. District 99: Mark Smith is running for South Carolina's 1st congressional district.

=== Democrats ===
1. District 52: Jermaine Johnson is running for governor.
2. District 115: Spencer Wetmore

== Predictions ==
Source	Ranking	As of
Sabato's Crystal Ball	Safe R	January 22, 2026
State Navigate	Likely R	August 27, 2026

== Summary by district ==
Italics denote an open seat retained by the party; bold text denotes a flip in party control.

District	2024 Pres.	Incumbent	Party	Elected	Outcome
1	R +59.2	Bill Whitmire	Rep	Bill Whitmire	Rep Hold
2	R +44.2	Adam Lewis Duncan	Rep	Adam Lewis Duncan	Rep Hold
3	R +26.9	Phillip Bowers	Rep	Phillip Bowers	Rep Hold
4	R +69.0	Davey Hiott	Rep	Clay Counts	Rep Hold
5	R +48.4	Neal Collins	Rep	Neal Collins	Rep Hold
6	R +47.5	April Cromer	Rep	April Cromer	Rep Hold
7	R +52.4	Lee Gilreath	Rep	Lee Gilreath	Rep Hold
8	R +41.5	Don Chapman	Rep	Don Chapman	Rep Hold
9	R +42.0	Blake Sanders	Rep	Blake Sanders	Rep Hold
10	R +47.2	Thomas Beach	Rep	Thomas Beach	Rep Hold
11	R +48.8	Craig A. Gagnon	Rep	Craig A. Gagnon	Rep Hold
12	R +3.7	Daniel Gibson	Rep	**Jumelle Brooks**	**Dem flip**
13	R +46.5	John R. McCravy III	Rep	John R. McCravy III	Rep Hold
14	R +40.0	Luke Samuel Rankin	Rep	Rick Shealy	Rep Hold
15	D +14.8	JA Moore	Dem	JA Moore	Dem Hold
16	R +32.9	Mark N. Willis	Rep	Mark N. Willis	Rep Hold
17	R +53.7	Mike Burns	Rep	Mike Burns	Rep Hold
18	R +46.2	Alan Morgan	Rep	Alan Morgan	Rep Hold
19	R +18.6	Patrick Haddon	Rep	Patrick Haddon	Rep Hold
20	R +33.1	Stephen Frank	Rep	Stephen Frank	Rep Hold
21	R +28.9	Dianne Mitchell (Note: Won 2025 special election after resignation of Republican Bobby Fox.)	Rep	Dianne Mitchell	Rep Hold
22	R +13.1	Paul Wickensimer	Rep	Paul Wickensimer	Rep Hold
23	D +21.3	Chandra Dillard	Dem	Chandra Dillard	Dem Hold
24	R +8.9	Bruce W. Bannister	Rep	Bruce W. Bannister	Rep Hold
25	D +17.1	Wendell K. Jones	Dem	Wendell K. Jones	Dem Hold
26	R +17.8	David Martin	Rep	David Martin	Rep Hold
27	R +15.8	David Vaughan	Rep	David Vaughan	Rep Hold
28	R +26.1	Chris Huff	Rep	Chris Huff	Rep Hold
29	R +50.6	Dennis Moss	Rep	Dennis Moss	Rep Hold
30	R +55.9	Brian Lawson	Rep	Brian Lawson	Rep Hold
31	D +34.6	Rosalyn Henderson-Myers	Dem	Rosalyn Henderson-Myers	Dem Hold
32	R +24.4	Scott Montgomery	Rep	Scott Montgomery	Rep Hold
33	R +37.8	Travis Moore	Rep	Travis Moore	Rep Hold
34	R +25.2	Sarita Edgerton	Rep	Sarita Edgerton	Rep Hold
35	R +35.7	Bill Chumley	Rep	Bill Chumley	Rep Hold
36	R +37.0	Rob Harris	Rep	Rob Harris	Rep Hold
37	R +35.9	Steven Wayne Long	Rep	Steven Wayne Long	Rep Hold
38	R +63.1	Josiah Magnuson	Rep	Josiah Magnuson	Rep Hold
39	R +53.2	Cal Forrest	Rep	Cal Forrest	Rep Hold
40	R +37.0	Joe White	Rep	Joe White	Rep Hold
41	D +14.1	Annie McDaniel	Dem	Annie McDaniel	Dem Hold
42	R +31.1	Doug Gilliam	Rep	Doug Gilliam	Rep Hold
43	R +34.0	Randy Ligon	Rep	Randy Ligon	Rep Hold
44	R +16.9	Mike Neese	Rep	Mike Neese	Rep Hold
45	R +23.5	Brandon Newton	Rep	Brandon Newton	Rep Hold
46	R +9.6	Heath Sessions	Rep	Heath Sessions	Rep Hold
47	R +43.7	Tommy Pope	Rep	Tommy Pope	Rep Hold
48	R +23.8	Brandon Guffey	Rep	Brandon Guffey	Rep Hold
49	D +22.9	John Richard C. King	Dem	John Richard C. King	Dem Hold
50	D +5.2	Keishan Scott	Dem	Keishan Scott	Dem Hold
51	D +26.4	J. David Weeks	Dem	J. David Weeks	Dem Hold
52	D +19.1	Jermaine Johnson	Dem	Malcolm Taylor	Dem Hold
53	R +43.5	Richie Yow	Rep	Richie Yow	Rep Hold
54	D +1.2	Jason S. Luck	Dem	Jason S. Luck	Dem Hold
55	R +1.7	Jackie E. Hayes	Dem	Jackie E. Hayes	Dem Hold
56	R +36.8	Tim McGinnis	Rep	Tim McGinnis	Rep Hold
57	R +9.4	Lucas Atkinson	Rep	**Cynthia Ford**	**Dem flip**
58	R +42.9	Jeff Johnson	Rep	Jeff Johnson	Rep Hold
59	D +13.0	Terry Alexander	Dem	Terry Alexander	Dem Hold
60	R +29.1	Phillip Lowe	Rep	Phillip Lowe	Rep Hold
61	R +32.3	Carla Schuessler	Rep	Carla Schuessler	Rep Hold
62	D +3.5	Robert Q. Williams	Dem	Robert Q. Williams	Dem Hold
63	R +21.1	Jay Jordan	Rep	Jay Jordan	Rep Hold
64	R +7.3	Fawn Pedalino	Rep	**Michele Demery**	**Dem flip**
65	R +44.8	Cody Mitchell	Rep	Cody Mitchell	Rep Hold
66	R +13.1	Jackie Terribile	Rep	**Heather Hart**	**Dem flip**
67	R +19.4	G. Murrell Smith Jr.	Rep	G. Murrell Smith Jr.	Rep Hold
68	R +38.1	Heather Ammons Crawford	Rep	Heather Ammons Crawford	Rep Hold
69	R +27.8	Chris Wooten	Rep	Chris Wooten	Rep Hold
70	D +11.1	Robert Reese	Dem	Robert Reese	Dem Hold
71	R +21.9	Nathan Ballentine	Rep	Nathan Ballentine	Rep Hold
72	D +41.6	Seth Rose	Dem	Seth Rose	Dem Hold
73	D +49.0	Christopher R. Hart	Dem	Christopher R. Hart	Dem Hold
74	D +60.8	Todd Rutherford	Dem	Todd Rutherford	Dem Hold
75	D +7.4	Heather Bauer	Dem	Heather Bauer	Dem Hold
76	D +60.2	Leon Howard	Dem	Leon Howard	Dem Hold
77	D +44.6	Kambrell Garvin	Dem	Kambrell Garvin	Dem Hold
78	D +23.9	Beth Bernstein	Dem	Beth Bernstein	Dem Hold
79	D +49.9	Hamilton R. Grant	Dem	Hamilton R. Grant	Dem Hold
80	R +18.6	Katherine D. Landing	Rep	Katherine D. Landing	Rep Hold
81	R +26.2	Charles Hartz	Rep	Charles Hartz	Rep Hold
82	R +2.0	Bill Clyburn	Dem	Bill Clyburn	Dem Hold
83	R +37.3	Bill Hixon	Rep	Bill Hixon	Rep Hold
84	R +31.4	Melissa Lackey Oremus	Rep	Melissa Lackey Oremus	Rep Hold
85	R +22.0	Jay Kilmartin	Rep	Jay Kilmartin	Rep Hold
86	R +34.8	Bill Taylor	Rep	Tommy Paradise	Rep Hold
87	R +45.5	Paula Rawl Calhoon	Rep	Paula Rawl Calhoon	Rep Hold
88	R +35.3	John Lastinger (Note: Won a 2025 special election after resignation of RJ May)	Rep	John Lastinger	Rep Hold
89	R +11.8	Micah Caskey	Rep	**Joe Madge**	**Dem flip**
90	D +12.4	Justin Bamberg	Dem	Justin Bamberg	Dem Hold
91	R +1.4	Lonnie Hosey	Dem	Lonnie Hosey	Dem Hold
92	R +12.0	Brandon Cox	Rep	**Byron Walters**	**Dem flip**
93	D +2.9	Jerry Govan Jr.	Dem	Jerry Govan Jr.	Dem Hold
94	R +17.0	Gil Gatch	Rep	Gil Gatch	Rep Hold
95	D +30.6	Gilda Cobb-Hunter	Dem	Gilda Cobb-Hunter	Dem Hold
96	R +40.9	Ryan McCabe	Rep	Hunter Hackett	Rep Hold
97	R +30.0	Robby Robbins	Rep	Robby Robbins	Rep Hold
98	R +7.2	Greg Ford	Rep	**Sonja Ogletree Satani**	**Dem flip**
99	R +23.2	Mark Smith	Rep	Jarrod Brooks	Rep Hold
100	R +22.3	Sylleste Davis	Rep	Sylleste Davis	Rep Hold
101	D +15.3	Roger K. Kirby	Dem	Roger K. Kirby	Dem Hold
102	R +5.7	Harriet Holman	Rep	**Montez Aiken**	**Dem flip**
103	D +3.5	Carl Anderson	Dem	Carl Anderson	Dem Hold
104	R +39.4	William Bailey	Rep	William Bailey	Rep Hold
105	R +43.7	Kevin Hardee	Rep	Kevin Hardee	Rep Hold
106	R +40.7	Val Guest Jr.	Rep	Val Guest Jr.	Rep Hold
107	R +28.0	Case Brittain	Rep	Case Brittain	Rep Hold
108	R +30.9	Lee Hewitt	Rep	Lee Hewitt	Rep Hold
109	D +28.6	Tiffany Spann-Wilder	Dem	Tiffany Spann-Wilder	Dem Hold
110	R +2.5	Tom Hartnett Jr.	Rep	Tom Hartnett Jr.	Rep Hold
111	D +48.4	Wendell Gilliard	Dem	Wendell Gilliard	Dem Hold
112	R +12.4	Joe Bustos	Rep	Joe Bustos	Rep Hold
113	D +39.0	Courtney Waters	Dem	Courtney Waters	Dem Hold
114	R +15.8	Gary Brewer	Rep	Gary Brewer	Rep Hold
115	D +3.5	Spencer Wetmore	Dem	Nick Uricchio	Dem Hold
116	R +0.6	James Teeple	Rep	**Clay N. Middleton**	**Dem flip**
117	R +19.9	Jordan Pace	Rep	Jordan Pace	Rep Hold
118	R +20.1	Bill Herbkersman	Rep	Bill Herbkersman	Rep Hold
119	D +8.4	Leon Stavrinakis	Dem	Leon Stavrinakis	Dem Hold
120	R +23.4	Weston J. Newton	Rep	Weston J. Newton	Rep Hold
121	D +16.5	Michael F. Rivers Sr.	Dem	Shannon DeLoach	Dem Hold
122	R +4.2	Bill Hager	Rep	**Korey Williams**	**Dem flip**
123	R +12.3	Jeff Bradley	Rep	Jeff Bradley	Rep Hold
124	R +16.6	Shannon Erickson	Rep	Shannon Erickson	Rep Hold

== Results ==
=== Results summary ===
Summary of the November 3, 2026 South Carolina House of Representatives election results
Party	Candidates	Votes	%	Seats	+/–	%
South Carolina Republican Party	106		%	79	-10	%
South Carolina Democratic Party	124		%	35	+10	%
Libertarian Party of South Carolina	6		%			%
United Citizens Party	3		%			%
South Carolina Workers Party	2		%			%
Total	241		100.00%	124	–	

== Primary election summary ==
Primary results sourced from the South Carolina Election Commission Web site. Results are unofficial with all counties fully reported.

=== Republican primaries ===
District	Nominee			Runners-up						Total		
District	Candidate	Votes	%	Candidate	Votes	%	Candidate	Votes	%	Votes	Maj.	Mrg.
1st	Bill Whitmire (incumbent)	3,919	59.83%	Craig A. Diem	2,631	40.17%	—	—	—	6,550	1,288	19.66%
3rd	Phillip Bowers (incumbent)	2,048	65.18%	Joe Burgett	1,094	34.82%	—	—	—	3,142	954	30.36%
5th	Neal Collins (incumbent)	2,974	55.90%	Brandy Tarleton	2,346	44.10%	—	—	—	5,320	628	11.80%
6th	April Cromer (incumbent)	3,806	57.35%	Kyle White	2,830	42.65%	—	—	—	6,636	976	14.71%
8th	Don Chapman (incumbent)	2,440	44.98%	Sherry Hodges	2,307	42.53%	Patrick Orr	678	12.50%	5,425	133	2.45%
8th (runoff)	Don Chapman (incumbent)	2,279	54.47%	Sherry Hodges	1,905	45.53%	—	—	—	4,184	274	8.94%
10th	Thomas Beach (incumbent)	3,208	68.68%	Stewart Watson	1,463	31.32%	—	—	—	4,671	1,745	37.36%
11th	Craig A. Gagnon (incumbent)	3,395	74.55%	Jesse Turner	1,159	25.45%	—	—	—	4,554	2,236	49.10%
13th	John R. McCravy III (incumbent)	4,520	83.44%	John D. Jefferson	897	16.56%	—	—	—	5,417	3,623	66.88%
14th	Rick Shealy	3,089	60.11%	Luke Samuel Rankin (incumbent)	2,050	39.89%	—	—	—	5,139	1,039	20.22%
21st	Dianne Mitchell	3,886	73.47%	Heather Currie	1,403	26.53%	—	—	—	5,289	2,483	46.95%
22nd	Paul Wickensimer (incumbent)	3,808	77.07%	Randolph Chuck Rhode Jr	1,133	22.93%	—	—	—	4,941	2,675	54.14%
26th	David Martin (incumbent)	2,419	53.90%	Elizabeth Enns	2,069	46.10%	—	—	—	4,488	350	7.80%
33rd	Travis Moore (incumbent)	3,289	66.69%	Abe Harris	1,643	33.31%	—	—	—	4,932	1,646	33.37%
36th	Rob Harris (incumbent)	1,796	50.49%	Adam Crisp	1,761	49.51%	—	—	—	3,557	35	0.98%
38th	Josiah Magnuson (incumbent)	4,455	80.56%	Charlianne Wyatt Nestlen	1,075	19.44%	—	—	—	5,530	3,380	61.12%
39th	Cal Forrest (incumbent)	4,343	77.73%	Katie Hall	858	15.36%	Fred Taylor	386	6.91%	5,587	3,485	62.38%
40th	Joe White (incumbent)	3,728	79.47%	Johnathan Ammons	963	20.53%	—	—	—	4,691	2,765	58.94%
44th	Mike Neese (incumbent)	2,410	51.47%	Tripp McCoy	2,272	48.53%	—	—	—	4,682	138	2.95%
45th	Brandon Newton (incumbent)	2,301	56.23%	Russell Brazell	1,791	43.77%	—	—	—	4,092	510	12.46%
65th	Cody Mitchell (incumbent)	3,211	73.26%	Barbara Arthur	1,172	26.74%	—	—	—	4,383	2,039	46.52%
69th	Chris Wooten (incumbent)	2,907	56.51%	John Allen	2,237	43.49%	—	—	—	5,144	670	13.02%
86th	Tommy Paradise	2,569	74.40%	Kim Ray	884	25.60%	—	—	—	3,453	1,685	48.80%
88th	John Lastinger	2,299	63.54%	Brian Duncan	1,319	36.46%	—	—	—	3,618	980	27.09%
91st	Daniel Alexander	1,949	80.30%	Tyler Morgan	478	19.70%	—	—	—	2,427	1,471	60.61%
96th	Hunter Hackett	1,426	48.24%	Scotty Whetstone	964	32.61%	Perry Finch	566	19.15%	2,956	462	15.63%
96th (runoff)	Hunter Hackett	1,525	67.30%	Scotty Whetstone	741	32.70%	—	—	—	2,266	359	34.60%
99th	Jarrod Brooks	1,740	43.67%	Kristy Gore	1,148	28.82%	2 others (Note: Shawn Pinkston: 638 votes, 16.01%; David Herndon: 458 votes, 11.50%)	1,096	27.51%	3,984	592	14.86%
99th (runoff)	Jarrod Brooks	1,913	64.61%	Kristy Gore	1,048	35.39%	—	—	—	2,961	359	29.22%
112th	Joe Bustos (incumbent)	2,652	57.11%	Woody Sprouse	1,396	30.06%	Brian Zuckerberg	596	12.83%	4,644	1,256	27.05%
115th	Johnnie Garmon	2,048	54.80%	Carlton Walker	1,689	45.20%	—	—	—	3,737	359	9.61%

=== Democratic primaries ===
District	Nominee			Runners-up						Total		
District	Candidate	Votes	%	Candidate	Votes	%	Candidate	Votes	%	Votes	Maj.	Mrg.
1st	Jasmine Williams	924	66.96%	Juni Lynch	456	33.04%	—	—	—	1,380	468	33.91%
24th	Caroline Avinger	2,651	81.05%	Justin Sanders	620	18.95%	—	—	—	3,271	2,031	62.09%
25th	Wendell K. Jones (incumbent)	2,279	54.48%	Derrick L. Quarles	1,904	45.52%	—	—	—	4,183	375	8.96%
31st	Rosalyn Henderson-Myers (incumbent)	1,558	51.95%	Mo Abusaft	1,441	48.05%	—	—	—	2,999	117	3.90%
47th	Justin Bennett	835	58.15%	Peter Martinez	601	41.85%	—	—	—	1,436	234	16.30%
49th	John Richard C. King (incumbent)	3,196	80.95%	Perry Sutton	752	19.05%	—	—	—	3,948	2,444	61.90%
51st	J. David Weeks (incumbent)	3,333	79.87%	Melissa J. Weeks Richardson	840	20.13%	—	—	—	4,173	2,493	59.74%
52nd	Malcolm Taylor	3,909	61.74%	Lawrence Moore	1,516	23.95%	Patrick L. Tate	906	14.31%	6,331	2,393	37.80%
54th	Jason S. Luck (incumbent)	2,102	55.67%	Betty Jo Quick	1,674	44.33%	—	—	—	3,776	428	11.33%
60th	Adrian Peguese Carter	1,673	57.85%	Melissa OShea	1,219	42.15%	—	—	—	2,892	454	15.70%
61st	Carol Goodman	956	66.76%	Pete Bember	476	33.24%	—	—	—	1,432	480	33.52%
63rd	Kory Haskins	1,709	67.90%	Sloan Hilton	808	32.10%	—	—	—	2,517	901	35.80%
64th	Michele Demery	2,874	65.89%	Jack Spann	1,488	34.11%	—	—	—	4,362	1,386	31.77%
70th	Robert Reese (incumbent)	2,860	50.15%	Noah Barker	1,525	26.74%	Eve Carlin	1,318	23.11%	5,703	1,335	23.41%
73rd	Chris R. Hart (incumbent)	3,930	76.15%	Cam George	1,231	23.85%	—	—	—	5,161	2,699	52.30%
79th	Hamilton R. Grant (incumbent)	5,526	71.91%	Anthony Stovall	2,159	28.09%	—	—	—	7,685	3,367	43.81%
86th	Malcolm Green	1,417	72.63%	Stuart Epting	534	27.37%	—	—	—	1,951	883	45.26%
94th	Sally Hebert	1,464	57.50%	Collin Holloway	564	22.15%	Bryan Sharper	518	20.35%	2,546	900	35.35%
99th	Samuel Price	1,269	59.75%	Jacob Goddard	855	40.25%	—	—	—	2,124	414	19.49%
101st	Roger K. Kirby (incumbent)	3,389	60.91%	Martin Cunningham	1,584	28.47%	Cheryl O. Lane	591	10.62%	5,564	1,805	32.44%
102nd	Montez Aiken	2,155	55.48%	Katie McCravy	1,729	44.52%	—	—	—	3,884	426	10.97%
103rd	Carl Anderson (incumbent)	3,106	70.40%	Wendell M. Padgett	1,306	29.60%	—	—	—	4,412	1,800	40.80%
116th	Clay Middleton	3,246	67.48%	Radia Baxter	941	19.56%	David Bell	623	12.95%	4,810	2,305	47.92%
121st	Shannon N. DeLoach	2,159	53.71%	Michael F. Rivers Sr. (incumbent)	1,861	46.29%	—	—	—	4,020	298	7.41%
122nd	Korey Williams	3,855	70.21%	Maja Moore	1,636	29.79%	—	—	—	5,491	2,219	40.41%
123rd	Ann C. Shippy	2,223	69.40%	Willie P. Aiken	980	30.60%	—	—	—	3,203	1,243	38.81%

== General election summary ==
District	Republican			Democratic			Libertarian			Total		
District	Candidate	Votes	%	Candidate	Votes	%	Candidate	Votes	%	Votes	Maj.	Mrg.
1st	Bill Whitmire (incumbent)		%	Jasmine Williams		%	—	—	—			%
2nd	Adam Lewis Duncan (incumbent)		%	Candace Schutt		%	Chris Des Marais		%			%
