= Dianne Mitchell =

American politician

Member of the South Carolina House of Representatives from the 21st district
- Incumbent
- Assumed office January 9, 2026
- Preceded by: Bobby Cox

Personal details
- Party: Republican

Dianne Mitchell is a member of the South Carolina House of Representatives where she has represented the 21st District since January 9, 2026. She is a member of the Republican Party.

Mitchell is a former teacher.

== Political career ==
=== Special election ===
On August 11, 2025, Republican incumbent Bobby Cox announced his resignation from the South Carolina House of Representative effective January 2026, in order to run for the seat of resigning senator Roger Nutt. The special election was scheduled for December 23, 2025, with primaries on October 21.

Mitchell announced her candidacy for the seat on August 25, 2025 and was backed by members of the South Carolina Freedom Caucus. Among her endorsers:

- Greenville Sheriff Hobart Lewis
- Upstate Businessman John Warren
- Rep. Thomas Beach (Anderson)
- Rep. Mike Burns (Greenville)
- Rep. April Cromer (Anderson)
- Rep. Stephen Frank (Greenville)
- Rep. Sarita Edgerton (Spartanburg)
- Rep. Jordan Pace (Berkeley)
- Rep. Jay Kilmartin (Lexington)
- Rep. Joe White (Newberry)
- Rep. Lee Gilreath (Anderson)
- Former Rep. Adam Morgan (Greenville)
- Former Rep. Ashley Trantham (Greenville)

Three other candidates filed to run for the SC House District 21 seat: Reggy Batson, small business owner and former firefighter; Steve Nail, Dean of Anderson University’s College of Business, and Jack Stott, chairman, Upstate Young Republicans.

On August 29, 2025, Cox suspended his campaign for the State Senate seat, citing business obligations.

Nail and Mitchell faced each other in the Republican Primary runoff, with Mitchell emerging the winner. With no Democrat in the race, Mitchell won the seat in December.

=== Party activism ===
Mitchell served as past chair of the Greenville Republican Women's Club.
