= Gary Simrill =

American politician

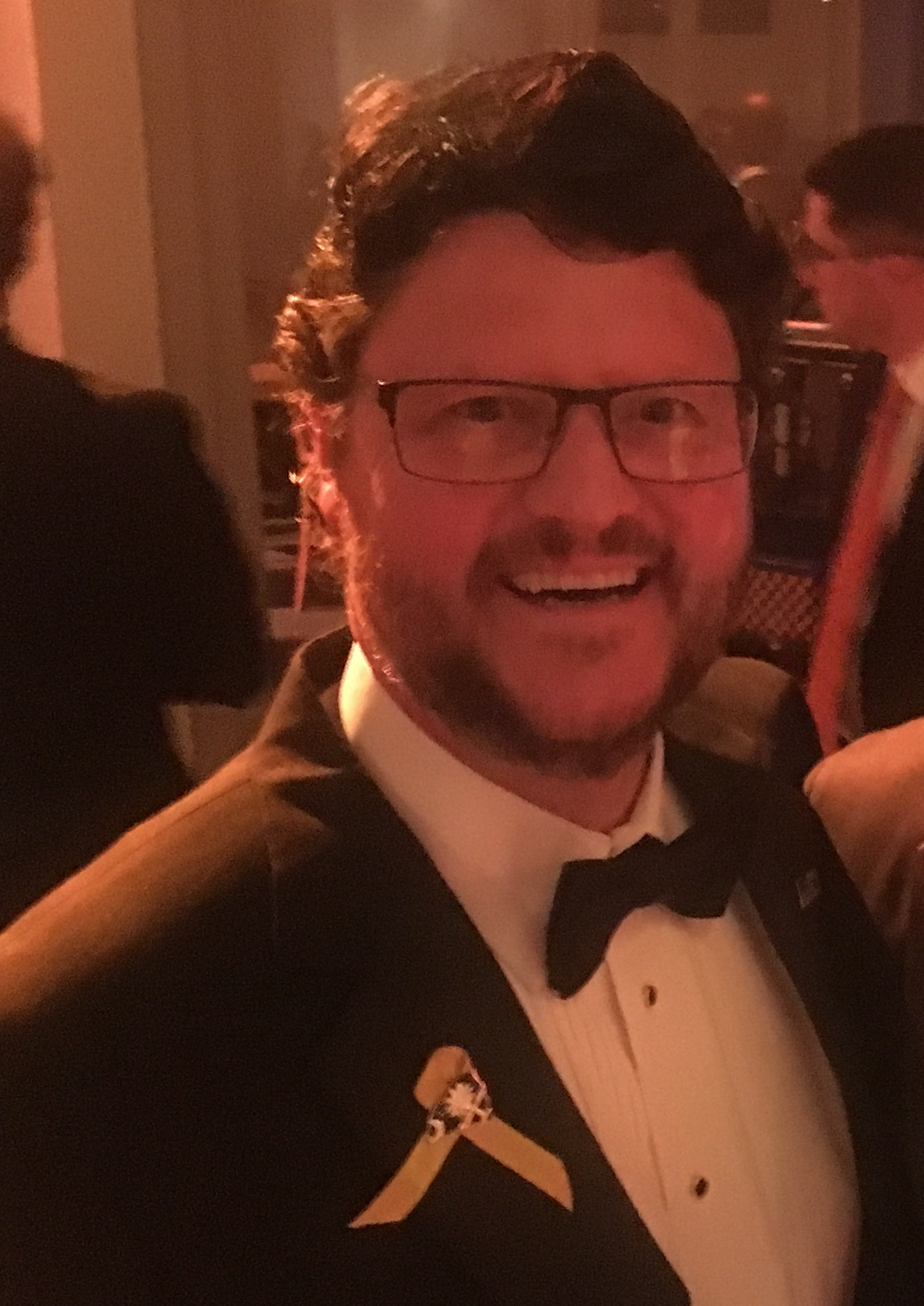

Majority Leader of the South Carolina House of Representatives
- In office December 6, 2016 – May 12, 2022
- Preceded by: Bruce W. Bannister
- Succeeded by: Davey Hiott

Member of the South Carolina House of Representatives from the 46th district
- In office January 1993 – November 14, 2022
- Preceded by: Wes Hayes
- Succeeded by: Heath Sessions

Personal details
- Born: May 29, 1966 (age 60) Rock Hill, South Carolina, U.S.
- Party: Republican
- Education: Winthrop University (BA)

J. Gary Simrill (born May 29, 1966) is an American politician. He was a member of the South Carolina House of Representatives from the 46th District, serving from 1992 to 2022. On December 6, 2016, he was elected as majority leader of the South Carolina House, which he held until May 2022. He is a member of the Republican party.

Simrill was the primary sponsor of the Infrastructure and Economic Development Act which went into effect on July 1, 2017.

During the 2019 Legislative Session, he authored and shepherded through the General Assembly the bill that allowed the Carolina Panthers to move their practice facilities to Rock Hill, South Carolina.

He retired from the House of Representatives in 2022, taking on the position of Special Assistant to the President for Community Engagement at Winthrop University, his alma mater.

South Carolina House of Representatives
Preceded by Bruce W. Bannister	Majority Leader of the South Carolina House of Representatives; 2016–2022	Succeeded by Davey Hiott
