= Clay Middleton =

American politician

Member-elect of the South Carolina House of Representatives from the 116th district
- Assuming office November 9, 2026
- Succeeding: James Teeple

Personal details
- Born: 1981 or 1982 (age 44–45) Charleston, South Carolina
- Party: Democratic
- Education: The Citadel
- Website: claymiddleton.com

Military service
- Allegiance: United States
- Branch/service: United States Army; Army National Guard
- Years of service: 2000–Present
- Rank: Lieutenant Colonel
- Commands: 228th Theater Tactical Signal Brigade

Clay N. Middleton is an American politician and military officer. He is a Democratic member-elect of the South Carolina House of Representatives, elected in 2026. Middleton will represents the 116th district, comprising Charleston and Colleton County Counties. Additionally, Middleton is a Lieutenant Colonel in the South Carolina Army National Guard as the commander of the 228th Theater Tactical Signal Brigade.

== Early life and career ==
Middleton attended Burke High School, where he participated in JROTC and was the student body president. He initially enlisted into the active duty Army, but switched to a National Guard scholarship at The Citadel. Middleton commissioned as an officer in the Signal Corps in 2003. He was sent to Taji, Iraq in 2004 for the Iraq War, and the US-Mexico border in 2006 as part of Operation Jump Start.

Middleton interned for US Senator Fritz Hollings in 2001. Subsequently, he worked in the office of Congressman Jim Clyburn, for nearly 8 years.

Middleton worked for the presidential campaigns of Barack Obama in 2008, Hillary Clinton in 2016, and Cory Booker in 2020. In late 2020, he worked on the Biden-Harris transition team.

== Political career ==
=== Party leadership ===
Middleton serves as a member of the Democratic National Committee for the state of South Carolina.

=== 2023 Mayoral election ===
Middleton ran for mayor of Charleston, South Carolina in 2023. He came in third place with 18% of the vote behind William Cogswell and John Tecklenburg, the incumbent. In the runoff election, Middleton endorsed Tecklenburg, who ultimately lost to Cogswell.

=== 2026 House of Representatives election ===
In 2026, Middleton ran for the South Carolina House of Representatives in District 116, seen as a key swing district. He defeated David Bell and Radia Baxter to secure the nomination. In the November general election, Middleton defeated incumbent Republican John Teeple.
