= Heather Hart (politician) =

American politician

Member-elect of the South Carolina House of Representatives from the 66th district
- Assuming office November 9, 2026
- Succeeding: Jackie Terribile

Personal details
- Party: Democratic
- Website: Campaign website

Heather Hart is an American politician. A member of the Democratic Party, she is the member for the 66th district of the South Carolina House of Representatives. She was elected at the 2026 election. She is a former Republican. She is an educator.
