= Clay Counts =

American politician

Member of the South Carolina House of Representatives from the 4th district
- Incumbent
- Assumed office November 9, 2026
- Preceded by: Davey Hiott

Personal details
- Party: Republican

Clay Counts is an American politician. A member of the Republican Party, he is the member for the 4th district of the South Carolina House of Representatives. He was elected at the 2026 election. He supports term limits.
