= Cezar McKnight =

American politician

Member of the South Carolina House of Representatives from the 101st district
- In office 2014–2022
- Preceded by: Ronnie A. Sabb
- Succeeded by: Roger K. Kirby

Personal details
- Born: December 10, 1973 (age 52) Kingstree, South Carolina, United States
- Party: Democratic
- Education: Morris Brown College (B.A.); Florida Coastal School of Law (J.D.)
- Profession: attorney

Cezar E. McKnight is an American politician. He is a former member of the South Carolina House of Representatives from the 101st District, serving since 2014. He is a member of the Democratic party.

In January 2022, McKnight made headlines after he introduced a bill named after George Stinney, a 14-year old black boy who was wrongfully executed in 1944, titled the George Stinney Fund, which would make the state of South Carolina pay $10 million to the families of the wrongfully executed if their conviction is posthumously overturned.

McKnight was defeated in the 2022 June Democratic Primary by Democrat Roger K. Kirby.

== Electoral history ==
South Carolina House of Representatives District 101
Year	Candidate	Votes	Pct	Candidate	Votes	Pct
2014 General Election	Cezar McKnight	7,257	64.1%	Al Smith	4,056	35.9%
2016 General Election	Cezar McKnight (i)	11,953	100.0%			
2018 Democratic Primary	Cezar McKnight (i)	4,191	69.7%	Alfred Darby	1,818	30.3%
2018 General Election	Cezar McKnight (i)	8,759	96.4%	Others/Write-in	327	3.6%

South Carolina House of Representatives
Preceded by Ronnie A. Sabb	Member of the South Carolina House of Representatives from the 101st district 2014-2022	Succeeded by Roger K. Kirby
