= Leola C. Robinson-Simpson =

American politician (born 1944)

Member of the South Carolina House of Representatives from the 25th district
- In office 2013–2022
- Preceded by: Karl B. Allen
- Succeeded by: Wendell K. Jones

Personal details
- Born: September 28, 1944 (age 81) Belton, South Carolina, United States
- Party: Democratic

Leola C. Robinson-Simpson (born September 28, 1944) is an American politician. She is a former member of the South Carolina House of Representatives from the 25th District, serving since 2013. She is a member of the Democratic party. She chose not to run for re-election in 2022. Her seat was won by Wendell K. Jones in the 2022 general election after defeating opponents in the June Primary.
