= Pat Henegan =

American politician

Member of the South Carolina House of Representatives from the 54th district
- In office November 10, 2014 – November 11, 2024
- Preceded by: Elizabeth Munnerlyn
- Succeeded by: Jason S. Luck

Personal details
- Born: June 22, 1948 (age 78) Fairmont, North Carolina, United States
- Party: Democratic
- Education: Francis Marion University (BA, MS); Winthrop University (EdS)

Patricia Moore Henegan (born June 22, 1948) is an American politician. She is a former member of the South Carolina House of Representatives from the 54th District, serving from 2014 to 2024. She is a member of the Democratic party.

Henegan chaired the South Carolina Legislative Black Caucus. She served on the House Judiciary and House Rules Committees.

Henegan was among a number of African American women from around the United States who endorsed Hillary Rodham Clinton for President in 2016.

Henegan did not file for re-election in 2024. Attorney Jason S. Luck filed for the seat, receiving the endorsement of both Henegan and Douglas Jennings Jr., who previously served in the seat. Luck defeated Betty Jo Quick in the Democratic Primary and Republican Sterling McDiarmind in the general election.
