= Sandy McGarry =

South Carolina politician

Member of the South Carolina House of Representatives from the 44th district

Personal details
- Born: Bar Harbor, Maine
- Party: Republican

Sandy McGarry (born November 14, 1961, in Bar Harbor, Maine) is a politician from South Carolina serving in the state House of Representatives.
