= Mike Neese =

American politician (born 1969)

Member of the South Carolina House of Representatives from the 44th district
- Incumbent
- Assumed office November 14, 2022
- Preceded by: Sandy McGarry

Personal details
- Born: October 22, 1969 (age 56) Virginia, U.S.
- Party: Republican
- Spouse: Christine (m. 1995)
- Children: 2
- Education: Appalachian State University (BA, BS)

James Michael Neese (born October 22, 1969) is an American politician serving as a member of the South Carolina House of Representatives from the 44th district since 2022. A member of the Republican Party, his district contains northernmost Lancaster County, representing suburbs of the Charlotte metropolitan area. He was first elected in the 2022 election, defeating Democratic nominee Katie Crosby.

South Carolina House of Representatives
Preceded by Sandy McGarry	Member of the South Carolina House of Representatives from the 44th district 2023–present	Incumbent
