= Travis Moore (politician) =

American politician

Member of the South Carolina House of Representatives from the 33rd district
- Incumbent
- Assumed office November 9, 2020
- Preceded by: Eddie Tallon

Personal details
- Party: Republican
- Spouse: Jenny Dunaway (m. 2007)
- Children: 4
- Education: The Citadel (BA); University of South Carolina (JD)
- Profession: attorney

Travis A. Moore is an American attorney and politician. He is a member of the South Carolina House of Representatives from the 33rd District, serving since 2020. He is a member of the Republican party.
