= Roger K. Kirby =

American politician (born 1960)

Member of the South Carolina House of Representatives from the 101st district
- Incumbent
- Assumed office 2022
- Preceded by: Cezar McKnight

Member of the South Carolina House of Representatives from the 61st district 2015-2022
- Preceded by: Lester P. Branham Jr.
- Succeeded by: Carla Schuessler

Personal details
- Born: April 20, 1960 (age 66) Florence County, South Carolina, United States
- Party: Democratic
- Education: Furman University

Roger K. Kirby (born April 20, 1960) is an American politician. He is the member of the South Carolina House of Representatives from the 101st District, serving in the House since 2015. Kirby is a member of the Democratic Party. He is Assistant Minority Leader of the House. Kirby serves on the Labor, Commerce and Industry as well as the Legislative Oversight Committee.

SC House District 61 was held by Kirby since 2015, but after redistricting created a new geographic District, Kirby defeated Democratic incumbent Cesar McKnight in the June 2022 Primary and went on to win SC House District 101 unopposed.

Kirby joined House members Todd Rutherford and Deon Tedder in forming the Freedom Caucus of South Carolina, in contrast to the conservative SC Freedom Caucus.

== Political career ==
Kirby is a former member of the South Carolina State House's Rules Committee, and served as a member on the Subcommittee on Wildlife, the Subcommittee on Health and Healthcare Industries, and the Regulations and Administrative Procedures Committee. He was Secretary of the Agriculture, Natural Resources and Environmental Affairs Committee.

In 2025, Kirby was elected First Vice Chair of the South Carolina Democratic Party.

== Electoral history ==
=== 2014 SC House of Representatives ===
Kirby was the only Democrat to run in 2014, so there was no Democratic primary.

South Carolina House of Representatives District 61 General Election, 2014
Party	Candidate	Votes	%
Democratic	Roger K. Kirby	5,570	62.9
Republican	Raleigh Ward, Jr.	3,279	37.1
Total votes		8,849	100.0
Democratic hold			

=== 2016 SC House of Representatives ===
Kirby was the only Democrat to run in 2016, so there was no Democratic primary.

South Carolina House of Representatives District 61 General Election, 2016
Party	Candidate	Votes	%
Democratic	Roger K. Kirby (incumbent)	10,086	100.0
Total votes		10,086	100.0
Democratic hold			

=== 2018 SC House of Representatives ===
Kirby was the only Democrat to run in 2018, so there was no Democratic primary.

South Carolina House of Representatives District 61 General Election, 2018
Party	Candidate	Votes	%
Democratic	Roger K. Kirby (incumbent)	7,246	98.5
Write-in		107	1.5
Total votes		7,353	100.0
Democratic hold			

== Honors and recognitions ==
In January 2024, Kirby gave the Democratic response to the State of the State address.

== Personal life ==
Kirby was born in Florence County and currently resides in Lake City. He attended Furman University, graduating in 1982. He is married to Pam Horton Kirby, with whom he has three children: Amy Lee, Mary Katherine, and Elizabeth Ann. He is a realtor and appraiser, and he served as President of the Pee Dee Realtor Association in 2010.
