= Paul Wickensimer =

American politician from South Carolina

Member of the South Carolina House of Representatives from the 22nd district
- Incumbent
- Assumed office November 2024
- Preceded by: Jason Elliott

Personal details
- Party: Republican

Paul Wickensimer is a member of the South Carolina House of Representatives, representing District 22. He is a member of the Republican Party.

== Early life and career ==
Wickensimer served as Greenville County Clerk of Court for 23 years, retiring in 2023.

== Political career ==
=== 2024 State House race ===
In January 2024, Republican incumbent Jason Elliott announced his run for South Carolina Senate, to replace retiring incumbent Dwight Loftis. Wickensimer filed for State House District 22, defeating Greenville County Council member Stan Tzouvelekas in the Republican primary.

Wickensimer defeated Democratic nominee Brann Fowler in the general election.

Wickensimer serves on the House Judiciary and Legislative Oversight committees.

=== Previous elected office ===
Prior to his service as clerk of court, Wickensimer was a Greenville County Council member for 15 years and former chair of the council.

== Awards and honors ==
Order of the Palmetto, 2021
