= Joe Bustos =

American politician

Member of the South Carolina House of Representatives from the 112th district
- Incumbent
- Assumed office November 9, 2020
- Preceded by: Mike Sottile

Personal details
- Born: Joseph M. Bustos; September 12, 1950 (age 75) Charleston, South Carolina, U.S.
- Party: Republican
- Spouse: Kathryn Comar (m. 1971)
- Children: 2
- Education: Columbia College (BA); Central Michigan University (MSA)

Joseph M. Bustos (born September 12, 1950) is an American politician. He is a member of the South Carolina House of Representatives from the 112th District, serving since 2020. He is a member of the Republican Party.
