= Chris Wooten =

American politician

Member of the South Carolina House of Representatives from the 69th district
- Incumbent
- Assumed office May 8, 2018
- Preceded by: Rick Quinn Jr.

Personal details
- Born: August 28, 1968 (age 58) Greer, South Carolina, United States
- Party: Republican
- Education: Northern Virginia Community College

Chris Wooten (born August 28, 1968) is an American politician. He is a member of the South Carolina House of Representatives from the 69th District, serving since 2018. He is a member of the Republican party.

Wooten received some notoriety in September 2019 after he was bitten by a snake outside his house. He recovered and was discharged from the hospital several days after the incident.
