= Jeff Bradley (politician) =

American politician (born 1957)

Member of the South Carolina House of Representatives from the 123rd district
- Incumbent
- Assumed office November 10, 2014
- Preceded by: Andy Patrick

Personal details
- Born: May 3, 1957 (age 69) Florence, Alabama, U.S.
- Party: Republican
- Education: University of North Alabama (B.S.)
- Profession: Financial advisor

Jeffrey A. Bradley (born May 3, 1957) is an American politician. He is a member of the South Carolina House of Representatives from the 123rd District, serving since 2014. He is a member of the Republican party.

Bradley is Chair of the House Regulations and Administrative Procedures Committee, and 1st Vice Chair of the House Education and Public Works Committee.

== Electoral history ==
South Carolina House of Representatives District 123
| Year | Candidate | Votes | Pct | Candidate | Votes | Pct | Candidate | Votes | Pct |
|---|---|---|---|---|---|---|---|---|---|
| 2014 General Election | Jeff Bradley | 9,744 | 99.4% | Uncontested | 0 | 0.0% | Others/Write-in | 57 | 0.6% |
| 2016 General Election | Jeff Bradley (i) | 14,425 | 98.9% | Uncontested | 0 | 0.0% | Others/Write-in | 155 | 1.1% |
| 2018 Republican Primary | Jeff Bradley (i) | 2,305 | 51.2% | Phil Hartman | 2,201 | 48.8% | | | |
| 2018 General Election | Jeff Bradley (i) | 10,781 | 62.0% | Mario Martinez | 6,594 | 37.9% | Others/Write-in | 19 | 0.1% |
| 2020 General Election | Jeff Bradley (i) | 14,604 | 62.5% | Christine deVries | 8,751 | 37.4% | Others/Write-in | 24 | 0.1% |
| 2022 General Election | Jeff Bradley (i) | 13,455 | 92.4% | Uncontested | 0 | 0.0% | Others/Write-in | 1,110 | 7.6% |
