= Wendell K. Jones =

American politician

Member of the South Carolina House of Representatives from the 25th district
- Incumbent
- Assumed office November 14, 2022
- Preceded by: Leola C. Robinson-Simpson

Personal details
- Born: March 12, 1971 (age 55) Spartanburg, South Carolina
- Party: Democratic
- Education: Wofford College

Wendell K Jones is an American politician. He is a member of the South Carolina House of Representatives from the 25th District, serving since 2022. Jones is a member of the Democratic party.

== Political career ==
=== 2022 SC House race ===
Jones ran to fill the seat of Democratic incumbent Leola C. Robinson-Simpson, who served since 2013 and chose not to run for re-election in 2022.

Jones won the District 25 seat over two opponents in the 2022 general election after defeating opponents in the June primary. His primary runoff with Derrick Quarels was briefly halted while the Court considered a challenge to Quarels being on the ballot.

Jones serves on the House Legislative Oversight and the Medical, Military, Public and Municipal Affairs Committees.

=== 2024 SC House race ===
Jones defeated Republican nominee Tim Kennedy in the general election.

== Personal life ==
Jones' son, Wendell K. Jones Jr., served as a special assistant to US Senator Jon Ossoff.
