= Robert Reese =

American politician (born 1967)

Member of the South Carolina House of Representatives for the 70th district
- Incumbent
- Assumed office December 4, 2024
- Preceded by: Jermaine Johnson (redistricted)

Personal details
- Born: November 13, 1967 (age 58) Columbia, South Carolina, U.S.
- Party: Democratic
- Children: 2
- Education: Morehouse College (BA); University of South Carolina (MBA)

Robert T. Reese (born November 13, 1967) is an American politician. A member of the Democratic Party, he is the representative for South Carolina's 70th district.

== Education and activism ==
Reese earned a bachelor's degree in Business Administration from Morehouse College and an MBA from the University of South Carolina. He is executive director of South Carolina Interfaith Power and Light.

Serving as head of a Lower Richland branch of the South Carolina NAACP, he led action to protect the environment.

== Political career ==
=== South Carolina House of Representatives ===
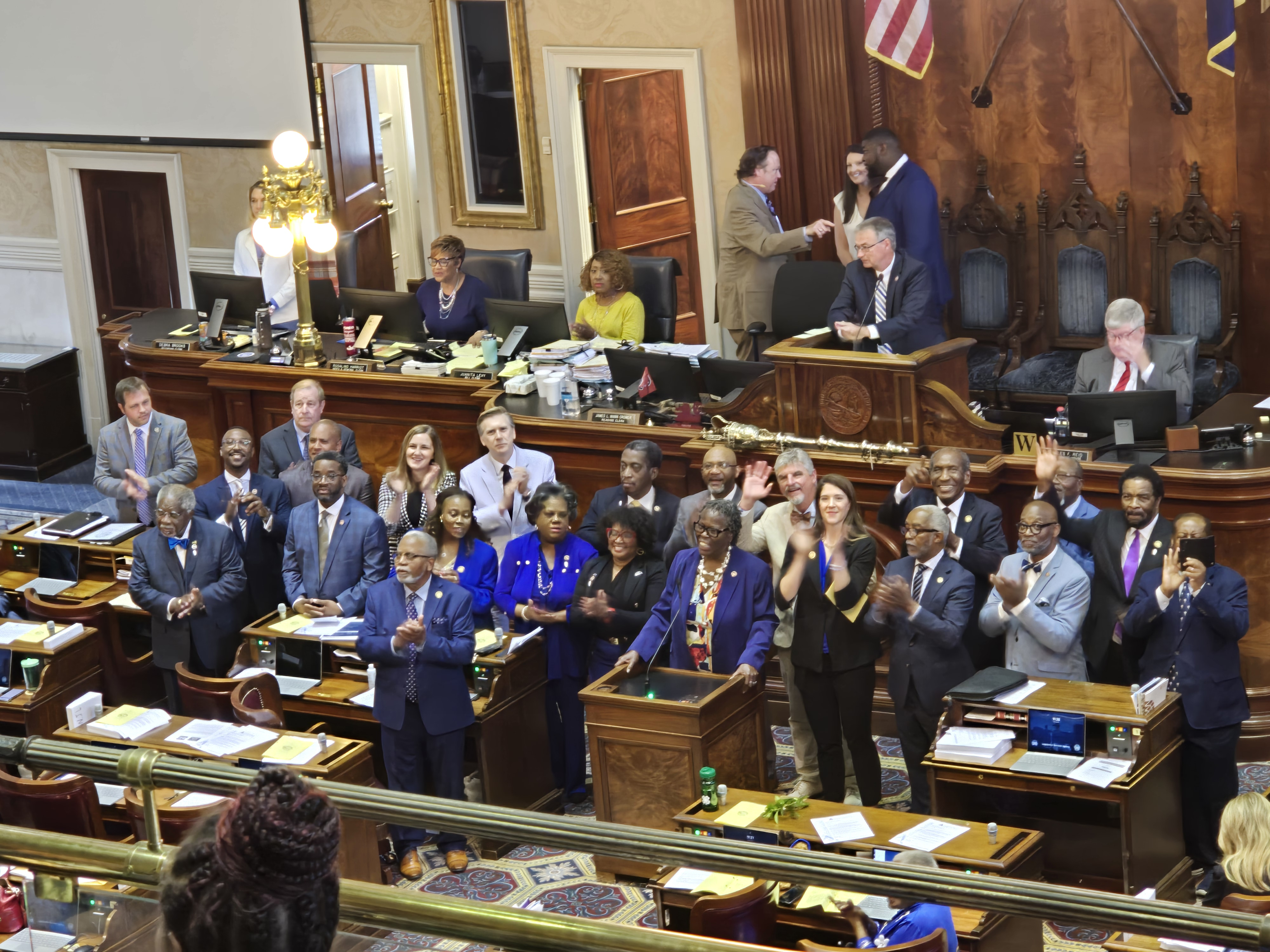
Reese (third from the right) with members of the South Carolina House of Representatives, 2025.

Reese defeated two candidates to become the Democratic nominee. He went on to win the seat unopposed in the general election.

Reese serves on the House Agriculture, Natural Resources & Environmental Affairs and the Operations and Management committees.
