= Tim McGinnis =

American politician

Member of the South Carolina House of Representatives from the 56th district
- Incumbent
- Assumed office January 9, 2018
- Preceded by: Mike Ryhal

Personal details
- Born: July 4, 1971 (age 55) Washington, Pennsylvania, United States
- Party: Republican
- Education: Georgia Southern University (BS)
- Profession: Businessman, news anchor

Timothy A. McGinnis (born July 4, 1971) is an American politician. He is a member of the South Carolina House of Representatives from the 56th District, serving since 2018. He is a member of the Republican party.
