= Kevin Hardee =

American politician

Member of the South Carolina House of Representatives from the 105th district
- Incumbent
- Assumed office November 12, 2012
- Preceded by: George M. Hearn

Personal details
- Born: April 9, 1965 (age 61) Conway, South Carolina
- Party: Republican

Kevin Hardee (born April 9, 1965) is an American politician who has served in the South Carolina House of Representatives from the 105th district since 2012.
