= J. David Weeks =

American politician (born 1953)

Member of the South Carolina House of Representatives from the 51st district
- Incumbent
- Assumed office November 13, 2000

Personal details
- Born: September 24, 1953 (age 72)
- Party: Democratic
- Spouse: Cheryl Elaine Hannibal
- Children: 2
- Education: Morris College (BA); University of South Carolina (JD); Howard University (MEd)
- Profession: Politician, lawyer

J. David Weeks (born September 24, 1953) is a member of the South Carolina House of Representatives, representing district 51 (Sumter County) since 2000. He is a member of the Democratic Party. He has served on the House Judiciary Committee and chaired the Legislative Black Caucus. Weeks now serves as Vice Chair of the House Ethics Committee and is a member of the Ways and Means Committee.

Weeks is an attorney. He lives in Sumter, South Carolina and has his offices in Columbia, South Carolina. He is married to the former Cheryl Elaine Hannibal; they have two children. He received a B.A. from Morris College in 1975, a J.D. degree from the University of South Carolina in 1989, and an M.Ed. from Howard University in 1996. He is a member of Phi Beta Sigma fraternity.
