= Jason S. Luck =

American politician

Member of the South Carolina House of Representatives from the 54th district
- Incumbent
- Assumed office November 11, 2024
- Preceded by: Pat Henegan

Personal details
- Born: July 4, 1977 (47 years old) Winston-Salem, North Carolina
- Party: Democratic
- Education: University of North Carolina at Chapel Hill (B.S.); University of South Carolina (J.D.)
- Occupation: Attorney, potter

Jason Scott Luck is an American politician, attorney, and potter. He is a member of the South Carolina House of Representatives from the 54th District, serving since 2024. The 54th District includes the majority of Marlboro County and portions of Chesterfield, Darlington, and Dillon Counties. He is a member of the Democratic party.

== Early life and family ==
Luck was born on July 4, 1977, in Winston-Salem, North Carolina. His father is Sid Luck, a well-known potter in the Seagrove, North Carolina, area, and his mother, Deborah Scott, is a retired librarian. The Luck family has been involved in the pottery industry since the mid-1800s and Luck is a sixth-generation potter. Sid Luck is a North Carolina Heritage Award honoree whose pottery could be found in the White House during Barack Obama’s administration.

== Education and Legal Career ==
In 2000, Luck graduated from the University of North Carolina at Chapel Hill with a Bachelor of Science in Anthropology and Mathematical Sciences (Computer Science concentration). After working in the software industry in Research Triangle Park, North Carolina, he enrolled in law school at the University of South Carolina at Columbia, graduating in 2005.

In 2006, Luck moved to Charleston, South Carolina, where he practiced law until August 2020.

In 2013, Luck was recognized as the South Carolina Pro Bono Lawyer of the Year by the South Carolina Bar Foundation. The award recognized Luck’s 3+ years of pro bono representation of a father whose parental rights were wrongfully terminated by the South Carolina Department of Social Services.

On December 29, 2019, Luck married Emzee Hilliard, daughter of the late Annie (Newton) Hilliard and the late Kenny Hilliard, at the Ralph Johnson VA Medical Center in Charleston, South Carolina.

In August 2020, Luck moved to Bennettsville, South Carolina, where he opened his own law office. Luck describes his practice as a general practice, but he has a particular interest in appellate practice and intellectual property.

Luck is admitted to practice in South Carolina, the United States Virgin Islands, the United States Patent and Trademark Office, the District of South Carolina, the Court of Appeals for the Second Circuit, the Court of Appeals for the Fourth Circuit, the Court of Appeals for the Federal Circuit, and the United States Supreme Court.

== Political career ==
Democratic incumbent Pat Henegan did not file for re-election in 2024. Luck filed for the seat, receiving the endorsement of both Henegan (who had served for ten years) and Douglas Jennings Jr., who previously served in the seat for twenty three years. Luck faced Betty Jo Quick in the Democratic Primary and Republican Sterling McDiarmind in the general election, defeating both. During the campaign, Luck was bitten by a rabid bat and his daughter was born eight weeks premature.

Luck serves on the Committee on Invitations and Memorial Resolutions (where he was elected secretary) and the Committee on the Judiciary (General Laws Subcommittee).
