= Brandon Newton =

American politician

Brandon Michael Newton

Member of the South Carolina House of Representatives from the 45th district
- Incumbent
- Assumed office November 14, 2016
- Preceded by: Deborah Long

Personal details
- Born: July 29, 1994 (age 32) Lancaster, South Carolina, U.S.
- Party: Republican
- Education: University of South Carolina Lancaster (A.A., A.S.); University of South Carolina (B.A.); Winthrop University (M.B.A.)

Brandon Michael Newton (born July 29, 1994) is an American politician. He is a member of the South Carolina House of Representatives from the 45th District, serving since 2016. He is a member of the Republican party.

Upon his election in 2016, Newton became the youngest member serving in the South Carolina House of Representatives. He was 22 years, 3 months, and 16 days old at the time he took office.

Newton was named as an elector for the 2020 presidential election, but was replaced by Theresa "Charm" Altman.

In June 2023, Newton endorsed Tim Scott in the 2024 United States presidential election.
