= Katherine D. Landing =

American politician (born 1963)

Member of the South Carolina House of Representatives from the 80th district
- Incumbent
- Assumed office November 14, 2022

Personal details
- Born: Katherine Dubeau; January 15, 1963 (age 63) New Orleans, Louisiana, U.S.
- Party: Republican
- Spouse: Joseph Landing (m. 1984)
- Children: 2
- Education: Duke University

Katherine D. Landing is an American politician of the Republican Party. She is the member of the South Carolina House of Representatives representing District 80. House District 80 was held by Jermaine Johnson, but after redistricting the District covered a new geographic area, leading Johnson to run for and ultimately win SC House District 70.

In the 2020 general election for US House of Representatives, Landing competed in a large field of Republican primary candidates, but was defeated in the Primary by Nancy Mace. In 2022, Landing ran for the new SC State House District 80, and after winning the Republican Primary, went on to defeat Democratic nominee Donna Brown Newton for South Carolina House of Representatives District 80. Landing formerly served on Mount Pleasant County Council and was a candidate for mayor in 2021.

Statements were issued by Henry McMaster, Governor of South Carolina, who won his re-election bid, and Drew McKissick, chair of the South Carolina Republican Party.

Landing serves on the House Education and Public Works Committee and on the House Rules Committee.

In her Freshman term first year, Landing submitted two bills: H.4373(125) Central Bank Digital Currency Prohibitions, and H.4374(125) Traditional Social Studies Standards.
