= Val Guest (politician) =

American politician, lawyer

Member of the South Carolina House of Representatives from the 106th district
- Incumbent
- Assumed office November 14, 2022
- Preceded by: Russell Fry

Personal details
- Born: Thomas Duval Guest Jr. April 7, 1960 (age 66) Greenville, South Carolina, U.S.
- Party: Republican
- Spouse: Jeanne Nystrom (m. 1992)
- Children: 2
- Education: The Citadel (BS); University of South Carolina (JD)

Thomas Duval "Val" Guest Jr. (born April 7, 1960) is an American politician and lawyer serving as a member of the South Carolina House of Representatives for the 106th district.

== Early life and education ==
Guest was born in Greenville, South Carolina. He earned a Bachelor of Science degree in business administration from The Citadel in 1982 and a Juris Doctor from the University of South Carolina School of Law in 1989.

== Career ==
Guest was elected to the South Carolina House of Representatives after defeating Brian Sweeney in a Republican Party primary and Ryan Thompson in the general election.

Guest serves on the House Judiciary Committee as well as on the House Legislative Oversight Committee.

A Myrtle Beach, South Carolina, resident, Guest is a partner in the law firm Ouverson, Guest & Carter, PA, in Murrells Inlet.

== Personal life ==
Guest married his wife, Jeanne Nystrom, in 1992. He has two children and is a member of the Belin Memorial United Methodist Church.
