= Brandon Guffey =

American politician

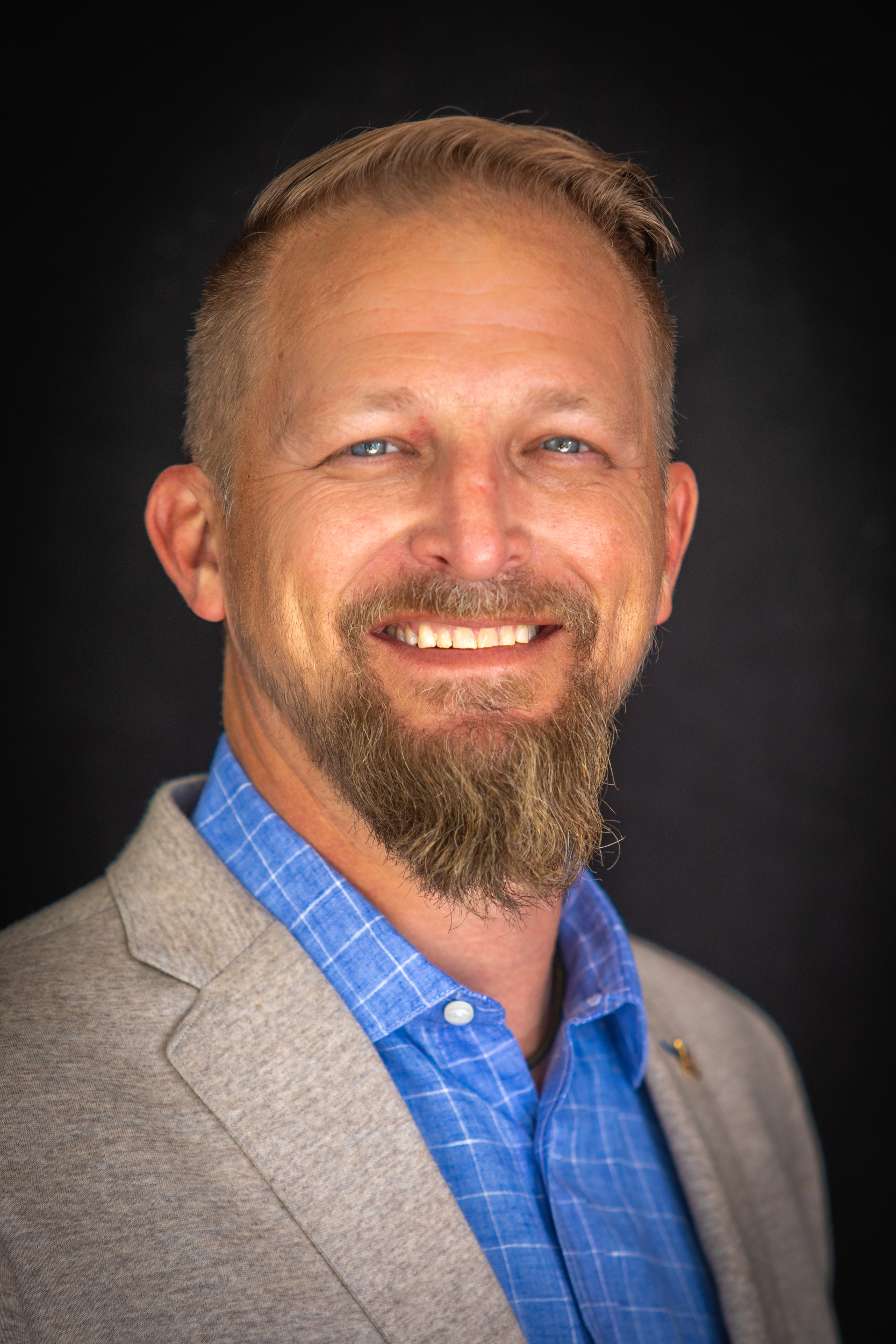

Member of the South Carolina House of Representatives from the 48th district
- Incumbent
- Assumed office January 10, 2023
- Preceded by: Bruce M. Bryant

Personal details
- Born: January 29, 1980 (age 46) York County, South Carolina
- Party: Republican
- Spouse: Melissa Glosson
- Children: 3

Brandon Guffey (born January 29, 1980) is an American politician of the Republican Party in South Carolina. He served for many years as a precinct president over his local precinct along with being president of his HOA. In 2022 he was elected a member of the South Carolina House of Representatives representing District 48.

Guffey began his political career as the York County Councilman representing District 6 after defeating incumbent county councilmember, former chairman, and former Chair of the York County Republicans Britt Blackwell in a 2020 primary runoff.

In the 2022 general election for South Carolina House of Representatives District 48, Guffey replaced retiring Representative Bruce M. Bryant. Guffey faced two other candidates in the 2022 primary election and won the most votes, at 43%, but as he did not secure a majority, there was a runoff between the top two candidates. Guffey won the primary runoff 57% to 43%, and in the general election he swept every precinct in District 48, winning 67% of the vote.

Guffey's oldest son, Gavin, killed himself at 17 after he became a victim of sextortion in July 2022. He has since become a spokesperson for mental health and against online crimes. He has posted videos on Facebook recounting live his emotions as he dealt with his family's loss, and a tell-all video on YouTube. He has also been interviewed regarding sextortion by CN2 News, WSOCTV, FitsNews, and The Post and Courier. He founded Less Than Three, a charity that campaigns for changes to social media that he believes would reduce teen suicide, and his book about his son's death, Tomorrow Needs You, is to be published in October 2026.

For the general session starting January 10, 2023, Guffey pre-filed a bill, H3583, that would make sextortion a felony in South Carolina. Guffey was assigned to the House Judiciary committee as a freshman along with House Regulations and Administrative Procedures committee.
