= Case Brittain =

American politician

Member of the South Carolina House of Representatives from the 107th district
- Incumbent
- Assumed office November 9, 2020
- Preceded by: Alan D. Clemmons

Personal details
- Born: Thomas Case Brittain; March 28, 1978 (age 48) Columbia, South Carolina, U.S.
- Party: Republican
- Spouse: Yvonne Marie (m. 2010)
- Children: 2
- Education: Wofford College (BS); Charleston School of Law (JD)

Thomas Case Brittain is an American attorney and politician. He is a member of the South Carolina House of Representatives from the 107th District, serving since 2020. He is a member of the Republican party.

== Political career ==
=== 2020 South Carolina House District 107 race ===
With the unexpected resignation of incumbent Alan D. Clemmons, Brittain joined the race for South Carolina House District 107 along with Mark Struthers McBride. Clemmons endorsed Brittain who won the Republican primary in a runoff with McBride and went on to win the election.

=== United States House of Representatives race ===
With the unexpected death of Republican incumbent US Senator Lindsey Graham, and the filing of US House member Russell Fry for the senate seat, news outlets mentioned Brittain as a possible candidate for the House seat if Fry won. Fry came in third in the Republican special primary election.

=== Endorsements ===
Brittain endorsed Lt. Governor Pamela Evette in the 2026 South Carolina Gubernatorial Republican primary.

== Election results ==
107th District General Election, 2020
Party	Candidate	Votes	%
Republican	Case Brittain	15,956	65.46
Democratic	Tony Cahill	7,963	32.67
Libertarian	Wm Dettmering III	427	1.75
Write-in		28	0.11
Total votes		24,374	100.0
Republican hold			
