= Davey Hiott =

American politician

Majority Leader of the South Carolina House of Representatives
- In office May 12, 2022 – 2026
- Preceded by: Gary Simrill
- Succeeded by: to be elected

Member of the South Carolina House of Representatives from the 4th district
- In office November 8, 2004 – November 9, 2026
- Succeeded by: Clay Counts

Personal details
- Born: David Rudolph Hiott; October 20, 1960 (age 66) Easley, South Carolina, U.S.
- Party: Republican
- Spouse: Lisa Clamp (m. 1988)
- Children: 2
- Education: Southern Wesleyan University (BA)

David Rudolph Hiott (born October 20, 1960) is an American politician. He was a member of the South Carolina House of Representatives from the 4th District (covering parts of Pickens and Pickens County), serving from 2005 to 2026. He is a member of the Republican party.

== Political career ==
Hiott has served as Chairman of the Agriculture, Natural Resources and Environmental Affairs Committee. He remains a member of that Committee, and now also serves on the House Rules Committee. He is a vocal advocate for fewer restrictions on legal firearm ownership and supported anti-abortion policies.

Hiott is the majority leader of the Republican party, elected in 2022 and re-elected in 2024.

== Electoral history ==
=== 2004 SC House of Representatives ===
South Carolina House of Representatives District 4 Republican Primary, 2004
Party	Candidate	Votes	%
Republican	Davey Hiott	2,612	52.8
Republican	Teddy Trotter	2,331	47.2
Total votes		4,943	100.0

South Carolina House of Representatives District 4 General Election, 2004
Party	Candidate	Votes	%
Republican	Davey Hiott	10,639	100.0
Total votes		10,639	100.0
Republican hold			

=== 2006 SC House of Representatives ===
Hiott was the only Republican to run in 2006, so there was no Republican primary.

South Carolina House of Representatives District 4 General Election, 2006
Party	Candidate	Votes	%
Republican	Davey Hiott (incumbent)	7,818	100.0
Total votes		7,818	100.0
Republican hold			

=== 2008 SC House of Representatives ===
Hiott was the only Republican to run in 2008, so there was no Republican primary.

South Carolina House of Representatives District 4 General Election, 2008
Party	Candidate	Votes	%
Republican	Davey Hiott (incumbent)	12,226	99.5
Write-in		67	0.5
Total votes		12,293	100.0
Republican hold			

=== 2010 SC House of Representatives ===
Hiott was the only Republican to run in 2010, so there was no Republican primary.

South Carolina House of Representatives District 4 General Election, 2010
Party	Candidate	Votes	%
Republican	Davey Hiott (incumbent)	8,355	100.0
Total votes		8,355	100.0
Republican hold			

=== 2012 SC House of Representatives ===
South Carolina House of Representatives District 4 Republican Primary, 2012
Party	Candidate	Votes	%
Republican	Davey Hiott (incumbent)	3,461	80.9
Republican	Vicky Wynn	818	19.1
Total votes		4,279	100.0

South Carolina House of Representatives District 4 General Election, 2012
Party	Candidate	Votes	%
Republican	Davey Hiott (incumbent)	14,384	99.4
Write-in		87	0.6
Total votes		14,471	100.0
Republican hold			

=== 2014 SC House of Representatives ===
South Carolina House of Representatives District 4 Republican Primary, 2014
Party	Candidate	Votes	%
Republican	Davey Hiott (incumbent)	2,772	59.4
Republican	Michelle Wiles	1,897	40.6
Total votes		4,669	100.0

South Carolina House of Representatives District 4 General Election, 2014
Party	Candidate	Votes	%
Republican	Davey Hiott (incumbent)	8,846	100.0
Total votes		8,846	100.0
Republican hold			

=== 2016 SC House of Representatives ===
Hiott was the only Republican to run in 2016, so there was no Republican primary.

South Carolina House of Representatives District 4 General Election, 2016
Party	Candidate	Votes	%
Republican	Davey Hiott (incumbent)	14,447	90.4
Libertarian	Joey Lum	1,532	9.6
Total votes		15,979	100.0
Republican hold			

=== 2018 SC House of Representatives ===
South Carolina House of Representatives District 4 Republican Primary, 2018
Party	Candidate	Votes	%
Republican	Davey Hiott (incumbent)	3,267	68.1
Republican	Phillip Healy	1,529	31.9
Total votes		4,796	100.0

South Carolina House of Representatives District 4 General Election, 2018
Party	Candidate	Votes	%
Republican	Davey Hiott (incumbent)	11,883	98.7
Write-in		152	1.3
Total votes		12,035	100.0
Republican hold			

=== 2020 SC House of Representatives ===
2020 South Carolina House of Representatives District 4 election
Party	Candidate	Votes	%
Republican	Davey Hiott	18,479	98.8%
Write-in		225	1.2%
Total votes		18,704	100.0%

=== 2022 SC House of Representatives ===
2022 South Carolina House of Representatives District 4 Republican primary
Party	Candidate	Votes	%
Republican	Davey Hiott	2,766	63.2%
Republican	Matthew Kutilek	1,610	36.8%
Total votes		4,376	100.0%

2022 South Carolina House of Representatives District 4 election
Party	Candidate	Votes	%
Republican	Davey Hiott	13,295	98.9%
Write-in		150	1.1%
Total votes		13,445	100.0%

=== 2024 SC House of Representatives ===
2024 South Carolina House of Representatives District 4 election
Party	Candidate	Votes	%
Republican	Davey Hiott	19,241	99.0%
Write-in		198	1.0%
Total votes		19,439	100.0%

== Personal life ==
Hiott was born in Easley and currently resides in Pickens. He attended Anderson Junior College (now Anderson University) for a year before transferring to Central Wesleyan College (now Southern Wesleyan University), and graduating in 1983 with a Bachelor of Arts degree in business. He is married to Lisa Clamp Hiott, with whom he has two children. He is the owner of the Hiott Printing Company.

South Carolina House of Representatives
Preceded by Gary Simrill	Majority Leader of the South Carolina House of Representatives; 2022–present	Incumbent
