= Tom Hartnett Jr. =

American politician

Thomas F. Hartnett, Jr.

Member of the South Carolina House of Representatives from the 110th district
- Incumbent
- Assumed office November 14, 2022
- Preceded by: William S. Cogswell Jr.

Personal details
- Born: February 11, 1971 (age 55) Charleston, South Carolina
- Party: Republican
- Spouse: Alison Dillon
- Children: 3 children, Thomas, Rhett, and Nicholas
- Parent(s): Bonnie and Thomas F. Hartnett
- Education: College of Charleston (B.A., 2009)
- Profession: Real Estate Appraiser

Thomas F. Hartnett, Jr. is an American politician representing representing District 110 in the South Carolina House of Representatives since 2022. The district consists of parts of Charleston County. He is a member of the Republican Party.

He is the son of Thomas F. Hartnett, a former congressman.

== Campaigns ==
=== 2022 South Carolina House of Representatives election ===
Hartnett Jr. announced his intention to run for the seat in March 2022. The incumbent, William S. Cogswell Jr., opted not to file for re-election to the House. Hartnett defeated Democratic opponent Ellis Roberts in the general election.

Hartnett is a member of the Education and Public Works and Invitations and Memorial Resolutions Committees. He is the son of former Congressman Thomas F. Hartnett who served the state of South Carolina for more than two decades across the South Carolina House of Representatives, South Carolina Senate, and U.S. House of Representatives.

Harnett endorsed Tim Scott's 2024 presidential campaign, later endorsing Ron DeSantis after Scott withdrew.

=== 2026 South Carolina House of Representatives election ===
Hartnett filed to run for re-election. He faces Democrat KJ Atwood, who shifted from running for Congress in the US House of Representatives Congressional District 1 race to the State House District 110 seat.
