= Robby Robbins =

American politician

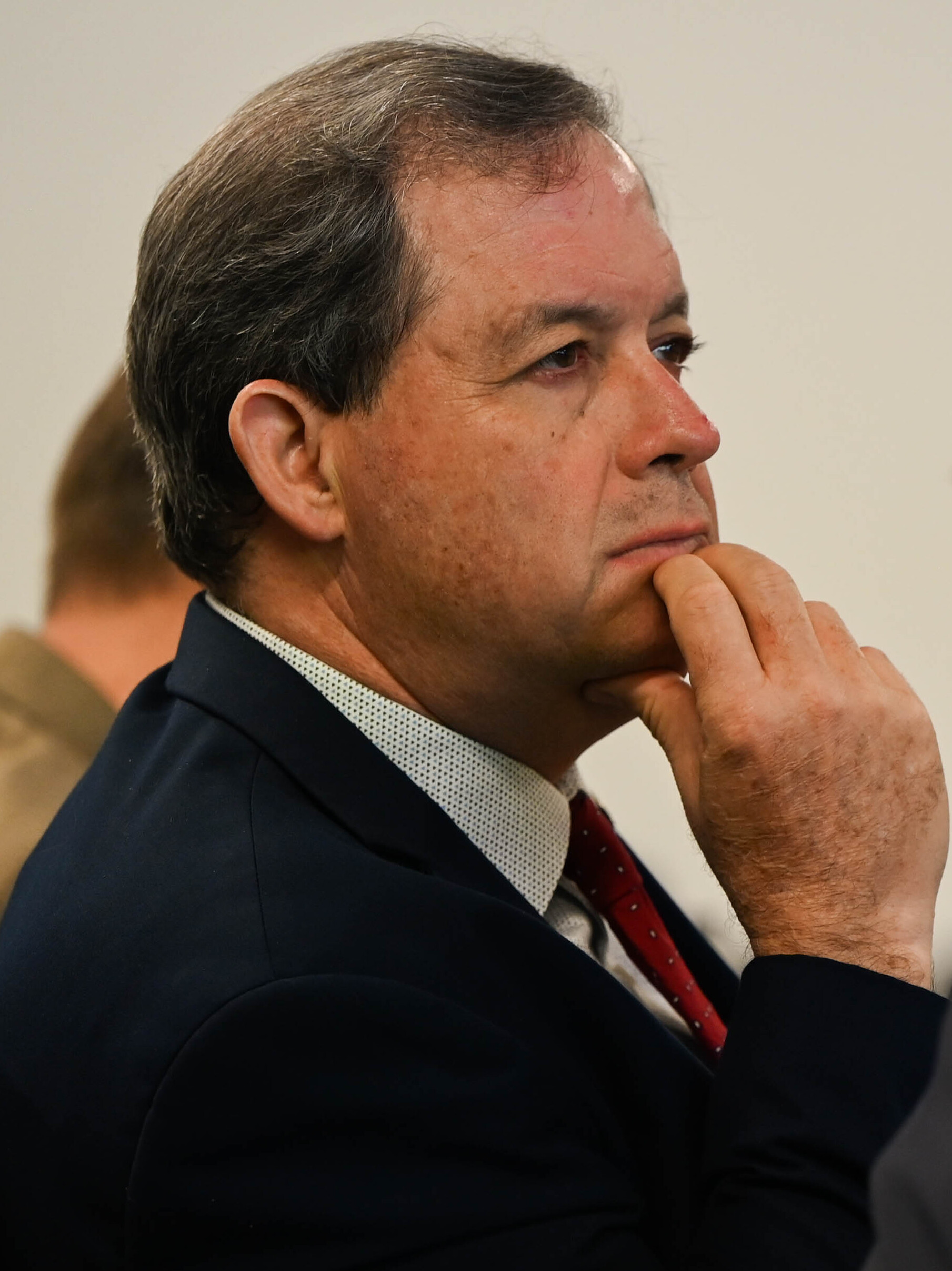
- Robbins in 2024

Member of the South Carolina House of Representatives from the 97th district
- Incumbent
- Assumed office November 14, 2022
- Preceded by: Mandy Kimmons

Personal details
- Born: May 5, 1962 (age 64) Charleston, South Carolina
- Party: Republican
- Education: University of South Carolina

Robby Robbins (born May 5, 1962) is an American Republican from South Carolina. Since 2022, he has been a member of the South Carolina House of Representatives for the 97th district.

== Political career ==
With the resignation of Walter Bailey, Robbins was named First Circuit Solicitor by Governor Mark Sanford. Robbins was defeated in 2004 by David Pascoe for the office.

In May 2022, Robbins won a special election for the 97th district, vacated when incumbent Mandy Kimmons opted not to run for re-election. He defeated Democrat ReZsaun Lewis to win the seat.
