= Cal Forrest =

American politician

Member of the South Carolina House of Representatives from the 39th district
- Incumbent
- Assumed office November 14, 2016
- Preceded by: Ralph Shealy Kennedy Jr.

Personal details
- Born: May 22, 1977 (age 49) Augusta, Georgia, United States
- Party: Republican

Cally R. Forrest (born May 22, 1977) is an American politician. He is a member of the South Carolina House of Representatives from the 39th District, serving since 2016. He is a member of the Republican party.
