= Jay Jordan (politician) =

American politician

Member of the South Carolina House of Representatives from the 63rd district
- Incumbent
- Assumed office April 1, 2015
- Preceded by: Kristopher Crawford

Personal details
- Born: February 6, 1980 (age 46) Florence, South Carolina, United States
- Party: Republican
- Education: College of Charleston (BA); Charleston School of Law (JD)
- Profession: Attorney

Wallace H. "Jay" Jordan, Jr. (born February 6, 1980) is an American politician. He is a member of the South Carolina House of Representatives from the 63rd District, serving since 2015. He is a member of the Republican party.

Jordan ran for the Senate seat vacated by Hugh Leatherman upon his death in 2021, but was defeated in the GOP Primary by Mike Reichenbach, who went on to win the seat.

Jordan is Chair of the House Ethics Committee and 1st Vice Chair of the Judiciary Committee.
