= Jeff Johnson (South Carolina politician) =

American politician

Member of the South Carolina House of Representatives from the 58th district
- Incumbent
- Assumed office 2014
- Preceded by: Liston Barfield

Personal details
- Born: March 20, 1971 (age 55) Conway, South Carolina, United States
- Party: Republican
- Education: Coastal Carolina University (BA); Palmetto Military Academy; Mississippi College School of Law (JD)
- Profession: attorney, businessman

Jeffrey E. Johnson (born March 20, 1971) is an attorney, businessman, and American politician. He is a member of the South Carolina House of Representatives from the 58th District, serving since 2014. He is a member of the Republican party. Johnson was in the SC Army National Guard from the years 1989–2002. He has been admitted to U.S. Court of Appeals, U.S. Supreme Court, U.S. District Court, and S.C. Supreme Court. Johnson is Chair of Criminal Laws and Chair Legislative Oversight Committee. He was formerly chair of Special Laws, chair of Education & Cultural Affairs Committee, and a Law Enforcement committee member.
