= Bill Chumley =

American politician

Member of the South Carolina House of Representatives from the 35th district
- Incumbent
- Assumed office November 8, 2010

Personal details
- Born: September 24, 1947 (age 78) Spartanburg, South Carolina, U.S.
- Party: Republican
- Profession: Politician

William M. Chumley (born September 24, 1947) is an American politician. He is a member of the South Carolina House of Representatives from the 35th District, serving since 2011. He is a member of the Republican party.

Chumley is a member of the South Carolina Freedom Caucus. He also serves on the House Agriculture, Natural Resources & Environmental Affairs Committee.

== Politics ==
In the aftermath of the mass shooting in Charleston in 2015, Chumley said he would not vote to remove the Confederate battle flag from the grounds of the state house. In press reports, he observed "These people sat in there and waited their turn to be shot, that's sad. Somebody in there with a means of self-defense could've stopped this."

On December 13, 2017, Chumley and fellow South Carolina representative Mike Burns proposed building a monument to South Carolina's black Confederate soldiers, although the historical record shows that no such soldiers existed.

In December 2016, Chumley pre-filed a bill that would require the installation of "pornography blockers" on all computers sold in South Carolina with a payment of $20 required to lift the blocker.

In December 2024, Chumley unsuccessfully challenged incumbent Murrell Smith for the House Speaker position.
