= Carl Anderson (South Carolina politician) =

American politician (born 1961)

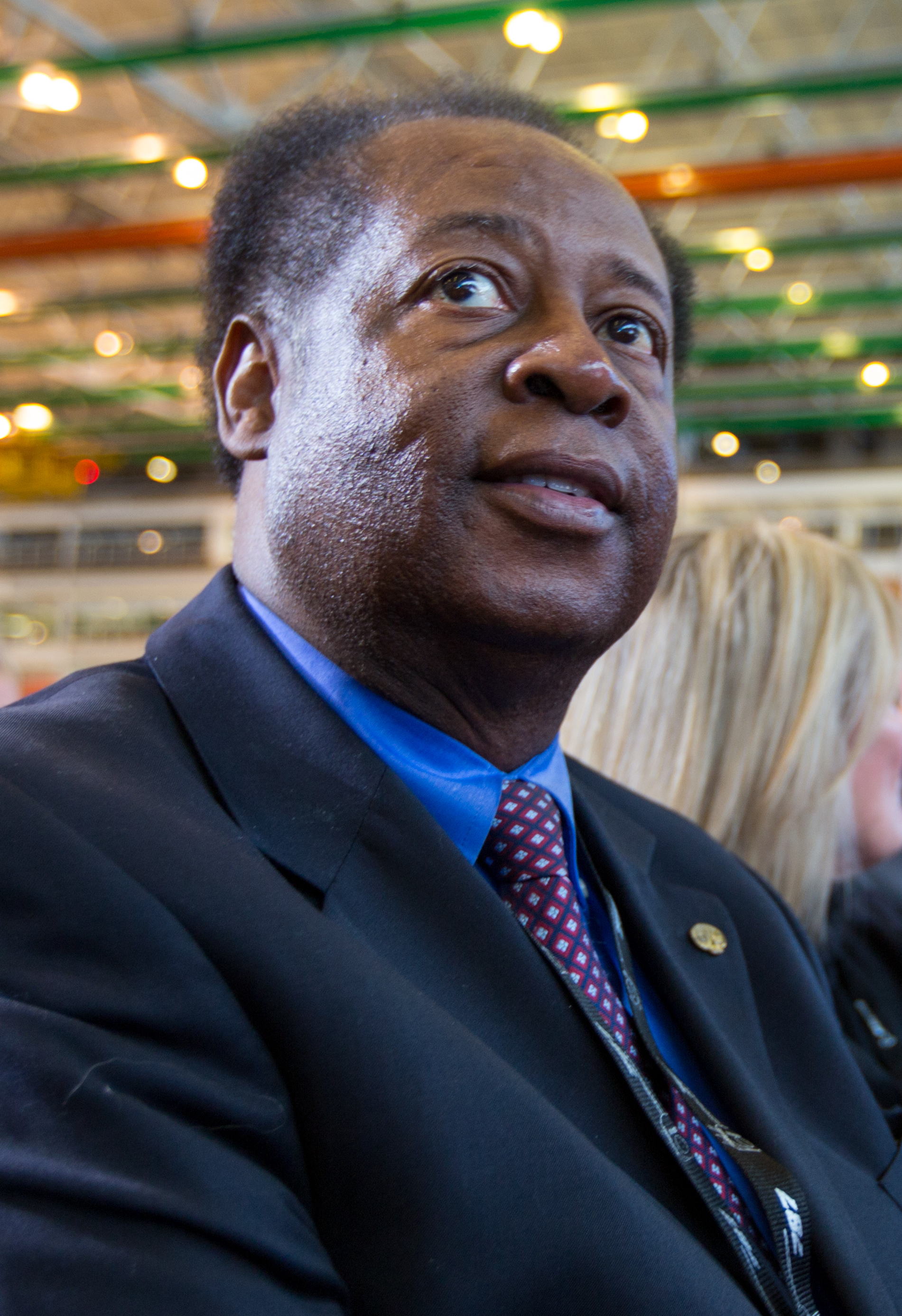

Member of the South Carolina House of Representatives from the 103rd district
- Incumbent
- Assumed office 2005
- Preceded by: John James Snow Jr.

Personal details
- Born: February 10, 1961 (age 65) Georgetown, South Carolina, U.S.
- Party: Democratic

Carl Anderson (born February 10, 1961) is an American politician. He is a member of the South Carolina House of Representatives from the 103rd District, serving since 2005. He is a member of the Democratic party.
