= Gilda Cobb-Hunter =

American politician (born 1952)

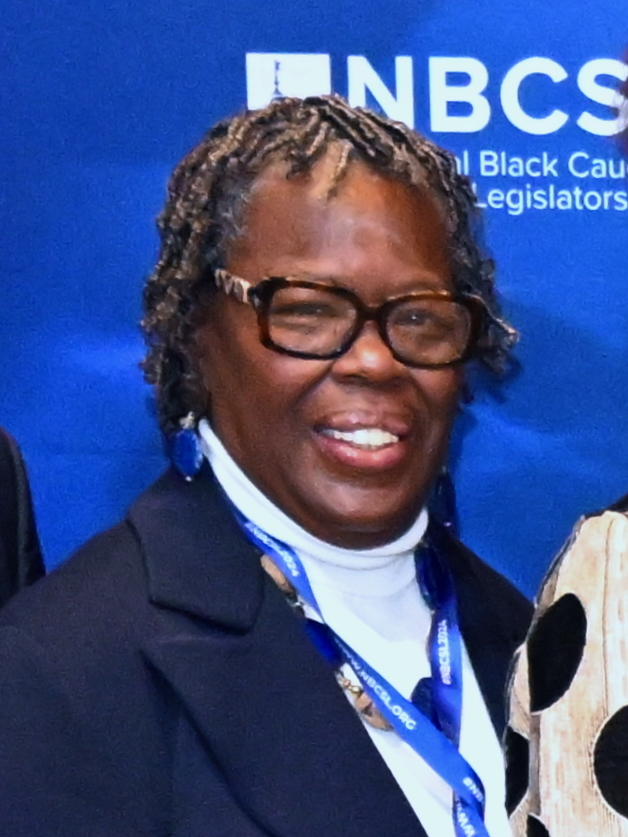

Member of the South Carolina House of Representatives from the 95th district
- Incumbent
- Assumed office January 28, 1992

Personal details
- Born: November 5, 1952 (age 73) Gifford, Florida
- Party: Democratic
- Spouse: Terry Hunter (m. 1975)
- Education: Florida A&M University, (BS); Florida State University, (MA))

Gilda Cobb-Hunter (born November 5, 1952, in Gifford, Florida) is a Democratic member of the South Carolina House of Representatives. She is the first African American woman elected to the State House from Orangeburg County.

Cobb-Hunter is the former representative for South Carolina's 66th district. Following redistricting and the 2022 general election, Cobb-Hunter now represents South Carolina House District 95 and was succeeded by David O'Neal for South Carolina's 66th district.

Cobb-Hunter serves as 1st Vice Chair of the House Ways and Means Committee.

== Early life and education ==
Gilda Cobb-Hunter earned her B.S. from Florida A&M University in 1973, and her M.A. from Florida State University in 1978. She earned her LISW from the South Carolina Board of Social Work Examiners in 1990.

== Career ==
Hunter was a teacher at Belleville Middle School in 1978. In 1979, she worked as an instructor at South Carolina State University. She worked as a caseworker for the Orangeburg Department of Social Services from 1979 to 1984. She has been executive director of CASA Family Services since 1985. She currently works as a social work administrator. She is also a member of Branchville's NAACP chapter. She is part of the North Carolina Civil Liberties Union chapter.

== Accomplishments ==
She was awarded Florida A & M University National Alumni Association 2014 Distinguished Alumnus Award.
