= David Vaughan (South Carolina politician) =

American politician and attorney

Member of the South Carolina House of Representatives from the 27th district
- Incumbent
- Assumed office November 14, 2022
- Preceded by: Garry R. Smith

Personal details
- Born: January 21, 1965 (age 61) Greenville, South Carolina, U.S.
- Party: Republican
- Education: University of South Carolina (BS)

David Vaughan is an American businessman and politician who is serving as a member of the South Carolina House of Representatives from the 27th district. He is a Republican.

== Early life, education and career ==
David Vaughan was born in Greenville, South Carolina. In 1987 he was graduated from the University of South Carolina with a Bachelor of Science degree.

In 1996, Vaughan became a business owner by constructing self-storage units around the Greenville area.

== Political career ==
=== 2022 South Carolina House of Representatives election ===
Vaughan won the June 2022 Republican primary with 52% of the vote, and won the general election unopposed. He succeeded Garry R. Smith, who had held the office since 2003 and did not seek reelection. Vaughan assumed office on December 6, 2022.

In 2023, Vaughan was briefly among the Republican co-sponsors of the South Carolina Prenatal Equal Protection Act of 2023, which would make women who had abortions eligible for the death penalty; he later withdrew his sponsorship, texting NBC News he had "signed on that bill in Error (sic)".

=== 2024 South Carolina House of Representatives election ===
In the 2024 general election, Vaughan was one of the South Carolina candidates endorsed by Americans for Prosperity.

Vaughn serves on the House Education and Public Works Committee In 2025 he chaired the House Education and Public Works Transportation subcommittee and served on the K-12 subcommittee. Vaughan also serves on the House Operations and Management Committee.

=== 2026 South Carolina House of Representatives election ===
In a rematch with Democrat John MacCarthy, Vaughan led by 38 votes after certification, triggering an automatic recount by state law.
