= Cody Mitchell =

American politician and attorney

Member of the South Carolina House of Representatives from the 65th district
- Incumbent
- Assumed office December 6, 2022
- Preceded by: Jay Lucas

Personal details
- Born: Cody Tarlton Mitchell; June 11, 1986 (age 40) Greeneville, Tennessee
- Party: Republican
- Spouse: Amanda Kathryn (m. 2015)
- Education: Presbyterian College (BA), University of South Carolina, (JD)

Military service
- Branch/service: United States Army National Guard
- Years of service: 2008–2012
- Rank: Major

Cody Mitchell is an American politician and lawyer who is currently serving as a member of the South Carolina House of Representatives from the 65th district. Mitchell is a Republican.

== Early life and career ==
Born in Greenville, Tennessee, Mitchell joined the military in 2008 and retired in 2012. He later served as a prosecutor in the South Carolina Army National Guard with the rank of major. He graduated from Presbyterian College with his bachelor of arts, and from the University of South Carolina with his Juris Doctor.

Mitchell became a law partner at the firm "Lucas, White & Mitchell" beginning in 2011. Jay Lucas, Speaker of the South Carolina House of Representatives, was one of his partners.

Mitchell served as a municipal judge for the towns of Bethune (2013–2021) and Hartsville (2013–2021). He also served as a municipal judge for the towns of McBee, Jefferson, and Biphopville.

=== DUI ===
Mitchell was arrested on May 8, 2021, in Chesterfield County by the South Carolina Highway Patrol for DUI after refusing to submit to an improperly requested breathalyzer test. He was also charged with having an open container of alcohol while driving. In early June, all charges were dismissed for lack of evidence by the court. Critics accused Mitchell of using his status and closeness to the Speaker of the South Carolina House of Representatives to get the charges dropped.

== Political career ==
Mitchell was elected in 2022 to the South Carolina House of Representatives for the 65th district from Sumter. He succeeded Jay Lucas, who was also one of his law partners and his mentor. Mitchell was sworn in on December 6, 2022. He serves on the judiciary and rules committee.
