= Carla Schuessler =

American politician

Member of the South Carolina House of Representatives from the 61st district
- Incumbent
- Assumed office December 2022
- Preceded by: Roger K. Kirby

Personal details
- Born: September 18, 1972 (age 54) Fort Wayne, Indiana
- Party: Republican
- Education: Illinois State University

Carla Schuessler is an American politician of the Republican Party. She is the member of the South Carolina House of Representatives representing District 61. District 61 was held by Roger K. Kirby, but after redistricting created a new geographic District, Kirby ran for and ultimately won House District 101.

Schuessler defeated Democratic Nominee Ashlyn Preaux for South Carolina House of Representatives District 61.

Statements were issued by Henry McMaster, Governor of South Carolina who won his re-election bid, and Drew McKissick, chair of the South Carolina Republican Party.
