= William Bailey (South Carolina politician) =

American politician (born 1962)

Member of the South Carolina House of Representatives from the 104th district
- Incumbent
- Assumed office November 12, 2018
- Preceded by: Greg Duckworth

Personal details
- Born: December 4, 1962 (age 63) Conway, South Carolina, U.S.
- Party: Republican
- Education: Horry-Georgetown Technical College (A.D.); Coastal Carolina University (B.A.); Webster University (M.S.)

William H. Bailey (born December 4, 1962) is an American politician. He is a member of the South Carolina House of Representatives from the 104th District, serving since 2018. He is a member of the Republican party.

In 2021, Bailey announced a campaign for the South Carolina 7th district in Congress against Tom Rice. Rice faced opposition in the Republican primary because of his vote to impeach Donald Trump. In 2022, Bailey did not file for the Congressional race, opting to run for re-election to his seat in the South Carolina House, which he won unopposed.

== Electoral history ==
South Carolina House of Representatives District 104
Year	Candidate	Votes	Pct	Candidate	Votes	Pct
2018 Republican Primary	William Bailey	2,312	50.2%	Greg Duckworth (i)	2,295	49.8%
2018 General Election	William Bailey	14,859	98.4%	Others/Write-in	244	1.6%
