= Don Chapman =

American politician

Member of the South Carolina House of Representatives from the 8th district
- Incumbent
- Assumed office November 14, 2022
- Preceded by: Jonathon D. Hill

Anderson City Council
- In office July 1, 2008 – December 17, 2021

Personal details
- Born: Donald Chapman; January 1, 1966 (age 60) Yokosuka, Japan
- Party: Republican
- Spouse: Amy Chapman (m. 1995)
- Education: Savannah College of Art and Design, (B.Des), (M.Arch)

Don Chapman is an American architect, builder, and politician who is currently serving as a member of the South Carolina House of Representatives from the 8th district. Representative Chapman represents the Republican party.

== Early life and career ==
Chapman was born in Japan. He attended Savannah College of Art and Design where he received a Bachelor's degree in interior design and a master's degree in architecture. In 1994, he founded his own architecture firm in Anderson, South Carolina.

Chapman serves on the House Rules and the Agriculture, Natural Resources and Environmental Affairs Committees.

== Political career ==
In 2008, Chapman was elected to the city council of Anderson, South Carolina. He held the position for 14 years. He resigned in 2021 to run for state representative for South Carolina's 8th district. The incumbent at the time was Jonathon D. Hill, who was accused of multiple ethics violations. Hill withdrew from the primary race and Chapman won the nomination. In the 2022 general election, Chapman defeated the Democratic candidate with over 70% of the vote. Upon his election to his first term, he made history as the first architect to serve the SC House of Representatives in over 100 years.
