= Randy Ligon =

American politician

Member of the South Carolina House of Representatives from the 43rd district
- Incumbent
- Assumed office November 12, 2018
- Preceded by: Francis Delleney Jr.

Personal details
- Party: Republican
- Education: Clemson University (BS); Missouri School of Auctioneering
- Profession: Farmer, auctioneer, realtor

Thomas R. "Randy" Ligon is a Republican member of the South Carolina House of Representatives, representing District 43 as a Republican—which encompasses parts of Chester and York Counties. He was first elected in 2018 and continues to serve in the legislature.

== Early life and education ==
Randy Ligon is the son of the late Grady Thomas Ligon and Jill Robinson Ligon. He earned a Bachelor of Science degree from Clemson University in 1982 and later graduated from the Missouri School of Auctioneering in 1987.

== Professional career ==
He also served as state president of the South Carolina Young Farmers Association in 1996, received an honorary FFA degree, and has been a member (and Paul Harris Fellow) of the Chester Rotary Club since 1994. Additionally, he is affiliated with Alpha Gamma Rho Fraternity and a member at Westminster Presbyterian Church in Rock Hill.

== Legislative service and committee roles ==
Ligon represents District 43 and assumed office in the South Carolina House in 2018.

As of the 2023–2024 session, he serves on the Labor, Commerce and Industry Committee and holds roles on these subcommittees:

- Chairman, Subcommittee on Real Estate
- Member, Subcommittee on Banking and Insurance
- Member, Subcommittee on Regulatory Review

== Electoral history ==
Ligon was first elected to the House in 2018. He won re-election in 2020, 2022, and 2024, with his current term extending through 2026.

== Personal life ==
On December 17, 1983, Ligon married Jean (“Jeannie”) Colones. Together, they have two children: George Thomas Ligon II and Mary Catherine Colones.
