= Dennis Moss =

American politician

Member of the South Carolina House of Representatives from the 29th district
- Incumbent
- Assumed office November 13, 2006
- Preceded by: E. DeWitt McCraw

Personal details
- Born: January 13, 1954 (age 72) Union, South Carolina, U.S.
- Party: Republican

Dennis Carroll Moss (born January 13, 1954) is an American politician. He is a member of the South Carolina House of Representatives from the 29th District, serving since 2007. He is a member of the Republican party.

Moss is Chair of the House Invitations and Memorial Resolutions Committee.
