= Seth Rose =

American politician

Member of the South Carolina House of Representatives from the 72nd district
- Incumbent
- Assumed office November 12, 2018
- Preceded by: James E. Smith Jr.

Personal details
- Born: December 26, 1980 (age 45)
- Party: Democratic
- Education: University of South Carolina (BA, JD)
- Profession: Attorney

Seth Rose is an American lawyer and politician. In 2024, he served as the president of the University of South Carolina Lettermen's Association. A former Richland County councilman (2011-2018), he is currently a member of the South Carolina House of Representatives from the 72nd District, serving since 2018. He is a member of the Democratic party. Rose is a former Richland County prosecutor and the principal attorney at Seth Rose, Attorney at Law.

== Career ==
As a councilman he is credited with instituting roll call voting and the broadcasting of council meetings over the internet/cable television. Rose was also responsible for: stopping unwanted rock quarries along Bluff Road near Williams-Brice Stadium and the Arthurtown neighborhood; closing adult businesses (in Council District 5) operating for decades in violation of county zoning laws; playing an integral part in the redevelopment of the Rosewood Curtiss Wright Hangar; stopping the practice of private websites putting all Richland County mugshots of accused citizens online and charging money for their removal; expanding library services across Downtown Columbia and St. Andrews (including the return of the Edgewood Library branch to the community after being closed for forty years); and voting against financially wasteful budget items.

Rose has also secured tens of millions in road improvements in the district he represents including pedestrian safety enhancements on Millwood Avenue, S. Main Street, Broad River Road, and a transformative twelve million dollar project on Harden Street in Five Points. Most recently Representative Rose secured 5 Million for a future pedestrian safety and road diet project for Devine Street, 12 million for a future Assembly street project (to include a 10 foot wide sidewalk around the State Fairgrounds), 5 million for Gervais Street in Downtown Columbia and 16 million in State Funds for infrastructure to spawn development along Columbia's riverfront.

Rose currently serves on the House Judiciary committee and the Operations and Management committee. Rose also serves on the Joint Legislative Committee to Screen Candidates for College and University Boards of Trustees. As a Freshman Legislator Rose had more bills signed into law than any other Legislator after having three bills he authored become law. Representative Rose has also passed several other laws to include a conditional discharge for disorderly conduct and expanding youthful offender criminal record expungements.

== Sports ==
Prior to his legal and political career, Rose was a First Team All-America singles tennis player for the University of South Carolina. In his college career Rose twice defeated the number one ranked NCAA singles player in the nation and was one of eight finalists for the NCAA Division 1 National Freshman of the year in 2000. Rose advanced to the Round of 16 in the 2003 Div. I NCAA Men's Singles Championships held in Athens, Georgia. He was inducted into the Gamecock Athletic Hall of Fame in 2014.
