= Bill Clyburn =

American politician

Member of the South Carolina House of Representatives from the 82nd district
- Incumbent
- Assumed office November 14, 1994

Personal details
- Born: May 19, 1941 (age 85) Camden, South Carolina, United States
- Party: Democratic

William Clyburn Sr. (born May 19, 1941) is an American politician. He is a member of the South Carolina House of Representatives from the 82nd District, serving since 1995. He is a member of the Democratic Party. Clyburn earned degrees from Allen University in 1964 and the University of South Carolina (M.Ed., 1975) He is a cousin of Jim Clyburn.
