= Leon Stavrinakis =

American lawyer and politician

Member of the South Carolina House of Representatives from the 119th district
- Incumbent
- Assumed office January 2007
- Preceded by: John Graham Altman

Personal details
- Born: Charleston, South Carolina, U.S.
- Party: Democratic
- Education: College of Charleston (BA); University of South Carolina (JD)

Leonidas Emanuel Stavrinakis is a state representative from South Carolina. He is a member of the Democratic Party.

== Personal life, education and career ==
Stavrinakis was born in Charleston, South Carolina. He graduated from the College of Charleston in 1988 and the University of South Carolina School of Law in 1992.

Stavrinakis runs his own law firm that he founded in 1996.

== Political career ==
=== Local office ===
From 1993 to 1996, Stavrinakis was the Assistant Solicitor for the Ninth Circuit, which includes Berkeley and Charleston Counties.

Stavrinakis served on the Charleston County council from 1999 to 2006, including service as its chair.

=== South Carolina House of Representatives 2006 election ===
Stavrinakis was elected to the South Carolina House of Representatives in 2006.

=== 2015 Charleston mayoral race ===
With the retirement of longtime mayor Joseph P. Riley Jr., Stavrinakis announced his run for Charleston mayor. He made it into a runoff and was ultimately defeated by John Tecklenburg.

Stavrinakis is Chair of the House Economic Development Budget Subcommittee. He serves on the House Ethics committee and on the House Revenue Policy Subcommittee and the House Sales & Use Tax and Income Tax Legislative Subcommittee of the House Ways and Means committee. He is Parliamentarian of the House Minority Caucus.

=== South Carolina House of Representatives 2026 election ===
Stavrinakis filed to run for re-election in March 2026.
