= Heath Sessions =

American politician

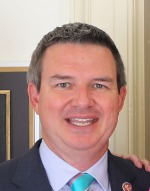
- Sessions in 2025

Member of the South Carolina House of Representatives from the 46th district
- Incumbent
- Assumed office November 14, 2022
- Preceded by: Gary Simrill

Personal details
- Born: Spartanburg, South Carolina
- Party: Republican
- Education: University of South Carolina

Heath Sessions is an American Republican from South Carolina. Since 2022, he has been a member of the South Carolina House of Representative for the 46th district.

Sessions is a small businessman in the city of Rock Hill.
