= Lee Gilreath =

American politician

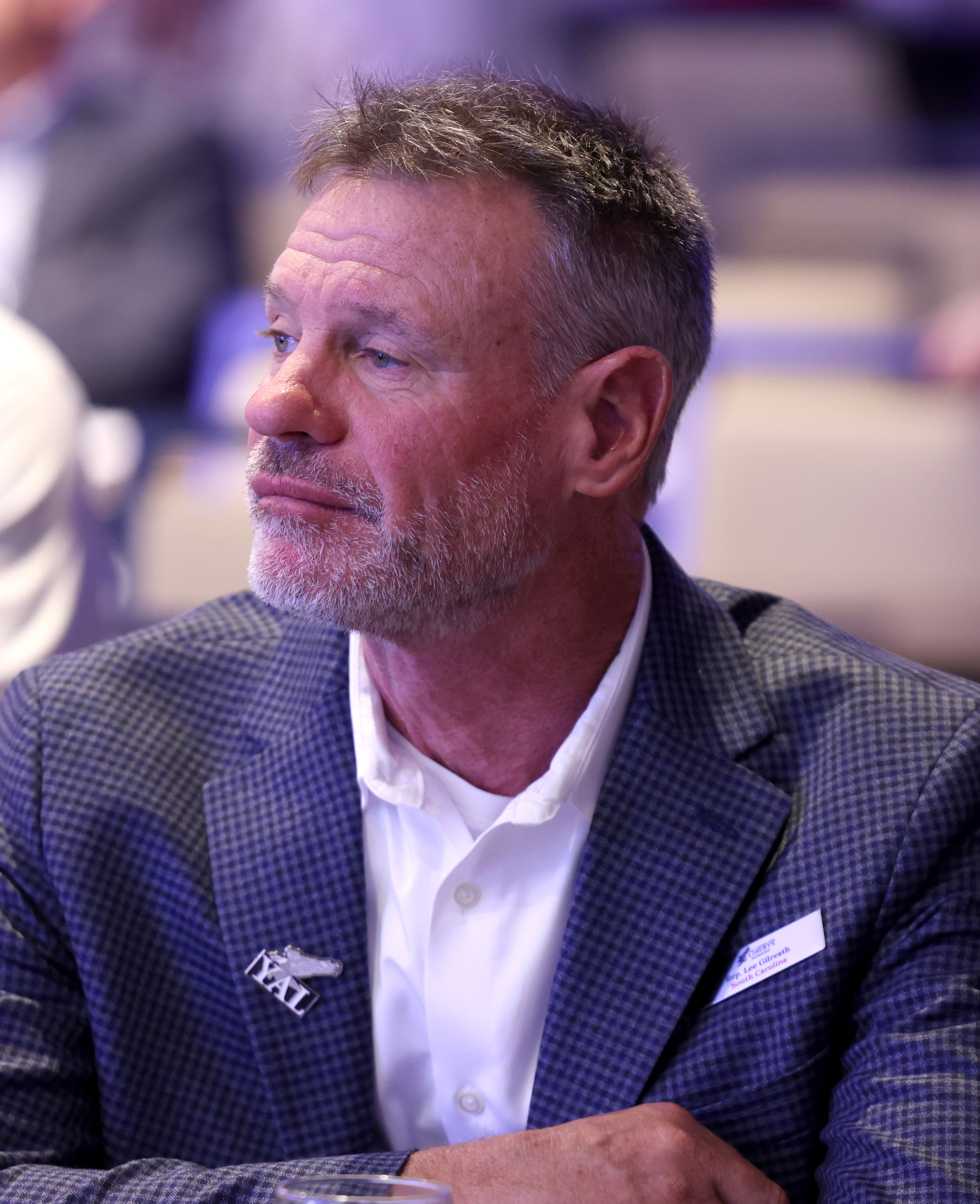
- Gilreath in 2024

Member of the South Carolina House of Representatives from the 7th district
- Incumbent
- Assumed office November 11, 2024
- Preceded by: Jay West

Personal details
- Born: Thomas Lee Gilreath
- Party: Republican

Thomas Lee Gilreath is an American politician. He serves as a Republican member for the 7th district of the South Carolina House of Representatives. Gilreath is a member of the South Carolina Freedom Caucus.
