= Sarita Edgerton =

American politician

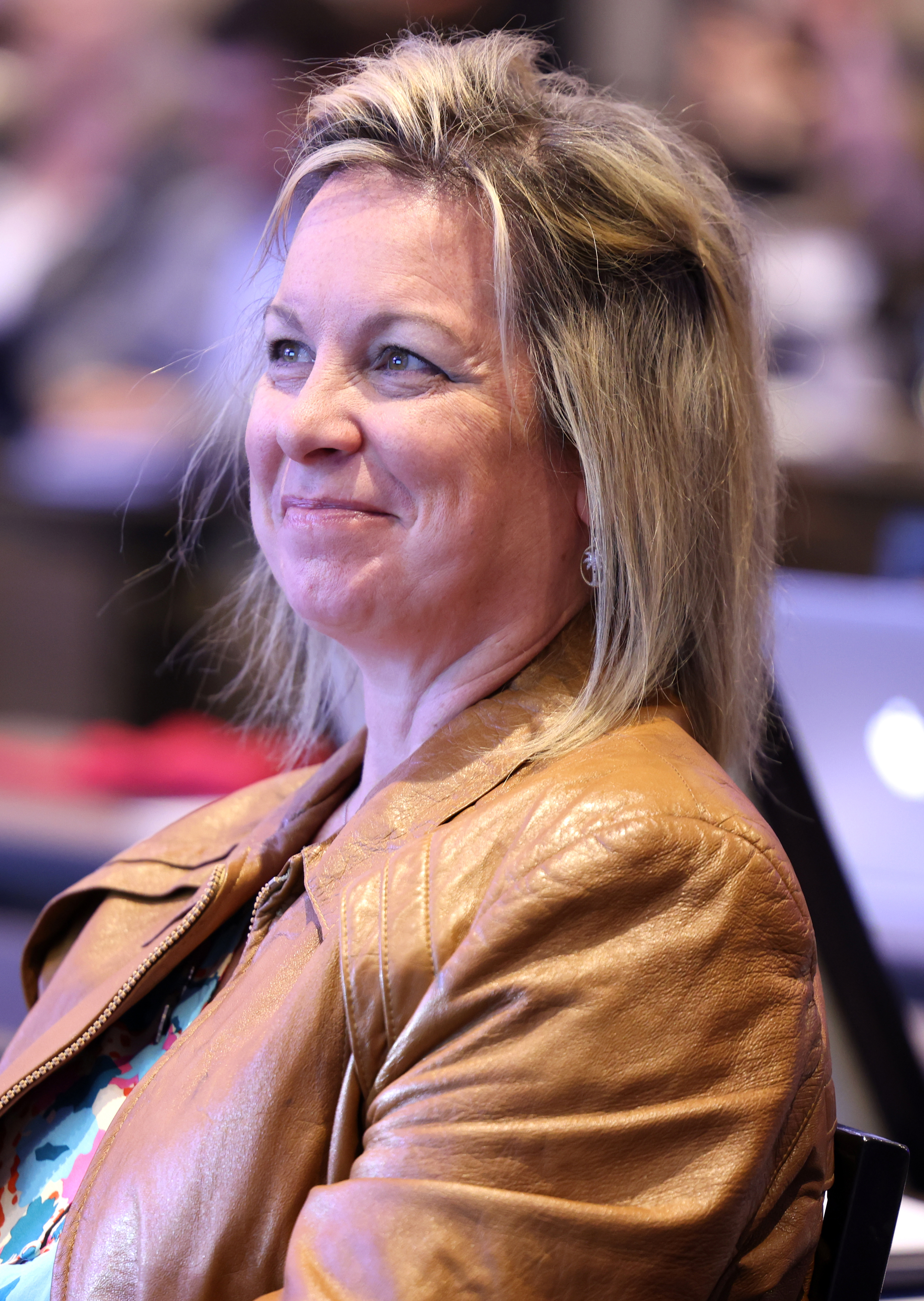

Member of the South Carolina House of Representatives from the 34th district
- Incumbent
- Assumed office November 11, 2024
- Preceded by: Roger Nutt

Personal details
- Born: Shelby, North Carolina
- Party: Republican
- Education: Winthrop University

Sarita Edgerton is an American politician. She is a member of the South Carolina House of Representatives from the 34th District, serving since 2024. She is a member of the Republican party.

Edgerton serves on the House Medical, Military, Public and Municipal Affairs committee.
