= James Teeple =

American politician

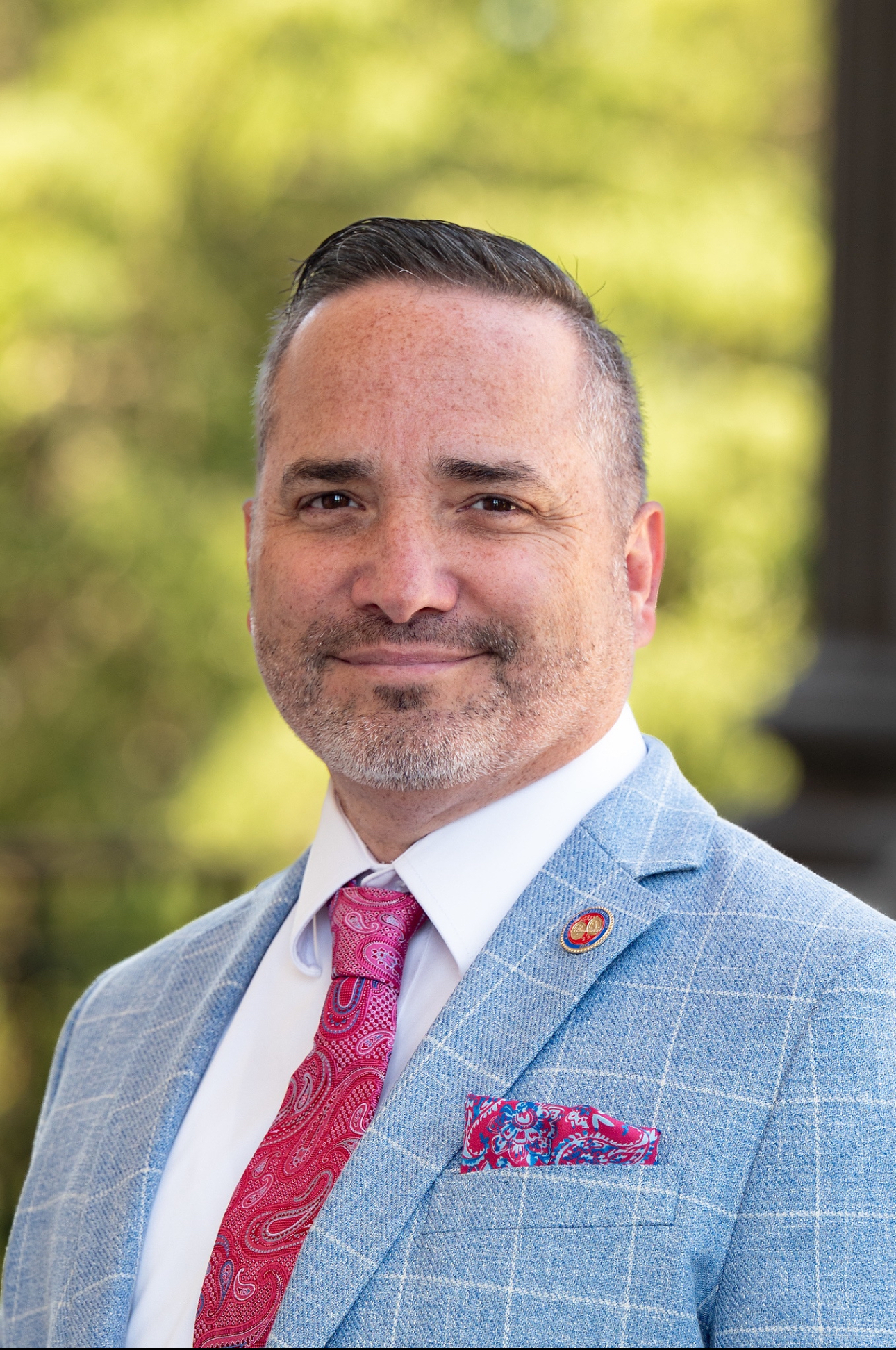
- Teeple in 2025

Member of the South Carolina House of Representatives from the 116th district
- Preceded by: Matt Leber
- Incumbent
- Assumed office November 11th, 2024

Personal details
- Born: December 20, 1979 (age 46)
- Party: Republican
- Education: Missouri State University

James E. Teeple is an American politician, businessman, US Navy veteran, and member of the South Carolina House of Representatives from the 116th District, which encompasses portions of Charleston & Colleton Counties. Teeple is a member of the House Republican Caucus.

== Community Service ==
Teeple is an advocate for St. Jude Children’s Research Hospital. He became involved in this effort after his daughter’s life was saved by St. Jude when she was diagnosed with a rare brain tumor (ETMR) at 3 years old. He was a recipient of the St. Jude Hope Award in 2025 after helping to raise millions of dollars for pediatric cancer research.

Teeple is a member of the Charleston County Volunteer Rescue Squad where he was honored with the 2022 Lifesaver of the Year Award.

== Political career ==
=== South Carolina State House of Representatives ===
In September 2023, Republican incumbent Matt Leber announced his candidacy for South Carolina State Senate District 41. Teeple announced his run for the seat held by the incumbent shortly afterward.

==== Endorsements ====
Teeple endorsements included:

- Americans for Prosperity
- National Rifle Association
- Gun Owners of America
- South Carolina Citizens for Life
- South Carolina Professional Firefighters
- International Association of Firefighters
- South Carolina Education Association
- Stand for Health Freedom
- South Carolina Fraternal Order of Police
- St. Andrews Firefighters- Local 3697
- James Island Professional Firefighters- Local 5385
- St. Johns Firefighters- Local 3883
- Charleston Firefighters Association- Local 61
- Charleston Mayor William Cogswell
- Charleston County Sheriff Carl Ritchie
- National Federation of Independent Business
- Charleston Metro Chamber of Commerce
- Concerned Veterans For America
- Medal of Honor Recipient- Major General James Livingston
- Lt. General Colby Broadwater
- South Carolina Association of Taxpayers
- Actor Kirk Cameron

Teeple serves on the Education and Public Works Committee, as well as the Regulations, Administrative Procedures, Artificial Intelligence, and Cybersecurity Committee, where he chairs the Education and Administrative Subcommittee.

Key legislation that Teeple has championed includes the Regulatory Freedom Act, SCDOT Modernization Act, Educator Assistance Act, and the Fentanyl Homicide Bill. Teeple was named the 2026 Legislator of the Year by the Professional Firefighters Association of South Carolina.

== Electoral history ==
South Carolina State House District 116 election, 2024
Party	Candidate	Votes	%
Republican	James Teeple	12,576	51.2%
Democratic	Charlie Murray	11,984	48.8%
Write-in		11	0.04%
Total votes		24,571	100.0%
Republican hold			
