= Stephen Frank =

American politician

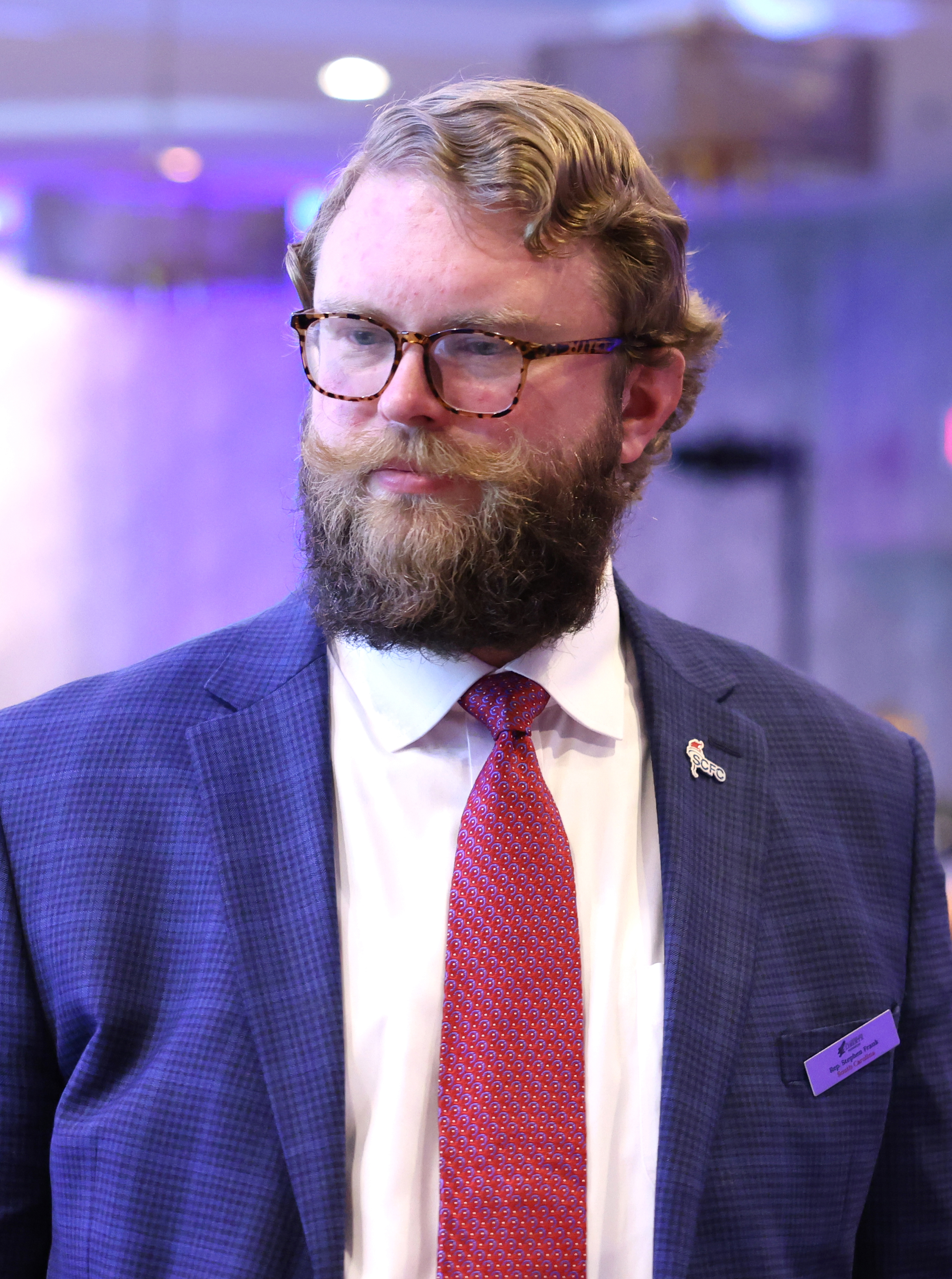
- Frank at the 2024 Hazlitt Summit hosted by Young Americans for Liberty Foundation

Member of the South Carolina House of Representatives from the 20th district
- Incumbent
- Assumed office November 11, 2024
- Preceded by: Adam Morgan

Personal details
- Party: Republican
- Occupation: Commercial Insurance

Stephen Frank is an American politician and a member of the South Carolina House of Representatives from the 20th District, serving since November 2024. He is a member of the Republican Party and the South Carolina Freedom Caucus.

== Early life and career ==
Frank is an insurance provider.

== Political career ==
Frank filed for House District 20 after Republican incumbent Adam Morgan announced his run for South Carolina's 4th Congressional District, a seat held by Republican incumbent William Timmons. Morgan ultimately lost the Republican primary to Timmons, vacating his own seat in the State House.

Frank defeated Sarah Curran in the Republican primary for House District 20. He faced Democrat Stephen Dreyfus in the general election, and defeated him to take the seat.

Frank serves on the House Education and Public Works committee.
