= Joe White (South Carolina politician) =

American politician (born 1945)

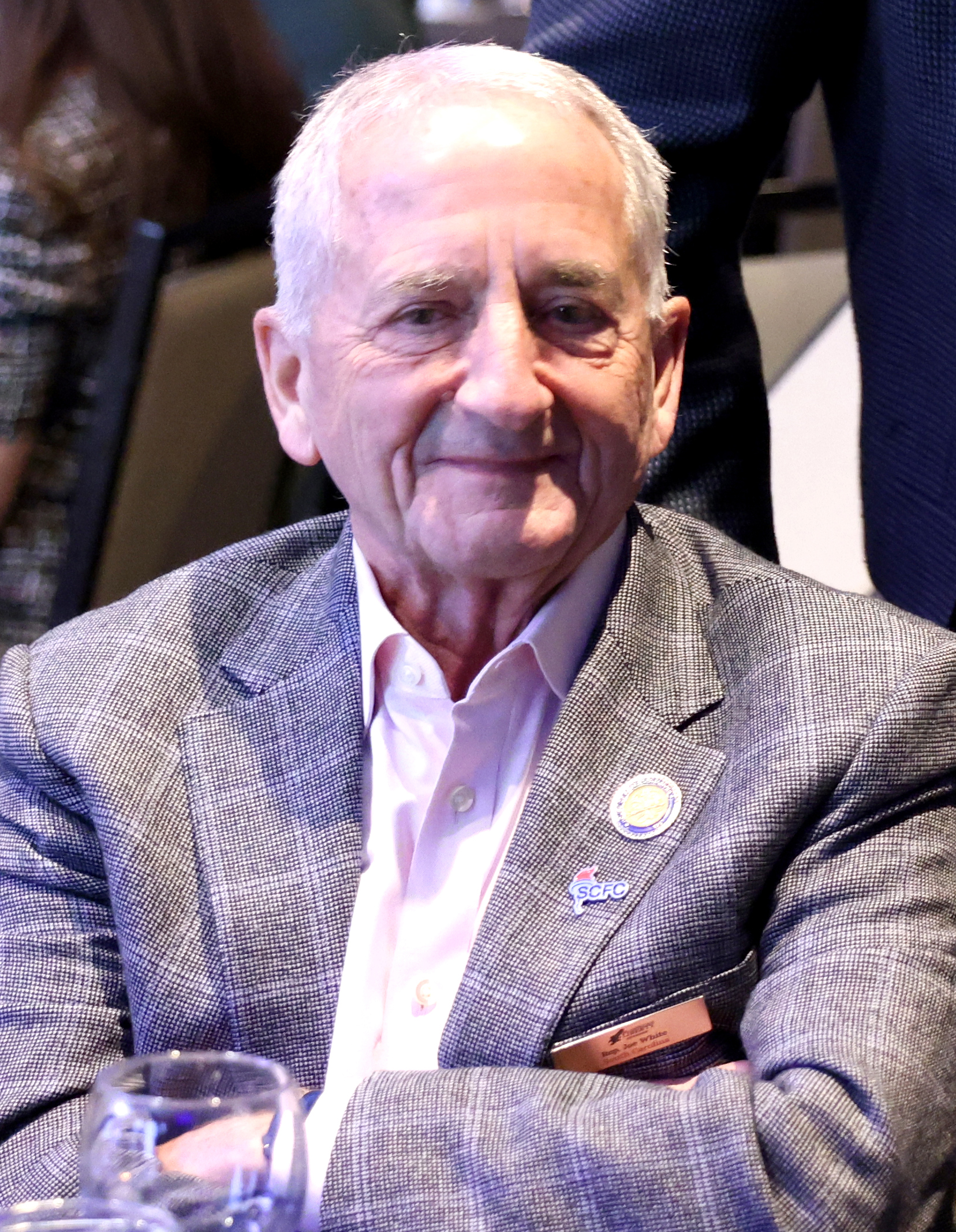
- White in 2024

Member of the South Carolina House of Representatives from the 40th district
- Incumbent
- Assumed office November 14, 2022
- Preceded by: Rick Martin

Personal details
- Born: Joseph White; December 13, 1945 (age 80) Rockwood, Tennessee
- Party: Republican
- Education: University of Tennessee, (B.S.)

Military service
- Branch/service: United States Air Force
- Years of service: 1966–1969
- Battles/wars: Vietnam War

Joe White (born 1945) is an American businessman and politician who is serving as a member of the South Carolina House of Representatives from the 40th district.

== Personal life and career ==
Born in Rockwood, Tennessee, White served in the U.S. Air Force during the Vietnam War. While in the USAF, on February 23, 1968, Joe married his childhood sweetheart, Linda Friel. After an honorable discharge, he returned to college, completing his B.S. degree at the University of Tennessee in Knoxville. Upon graduation, he worked for Sears. Following five years with Sears, White became a sales representative for the pharmaceutical company, Beecham Laboratories. After five years with Beecham, Joe, and his wife, started their own small business, which they grew to a 6 location, 65 employee business over the next 35 years. White retired from that enterprise in 2017. Joe and Linda have two children, Christopher Neil White, and Robin White Soster, as well as six grandchildren.

== Political career ==
White defeated incumbent Rick Martin in the 2022 Republican primary, and the second place finisher in the 2022 Republican primary runoff, receiving 53% of the total vote. He was unopposed in the general election and was sworn in on December 6, 2022.

White serves on the House Medical, Military, Public and Municipal Affairs Committee, and is a member of the South Carolina Freedom Caucus.
