= Jay Kilmartin =

American politician

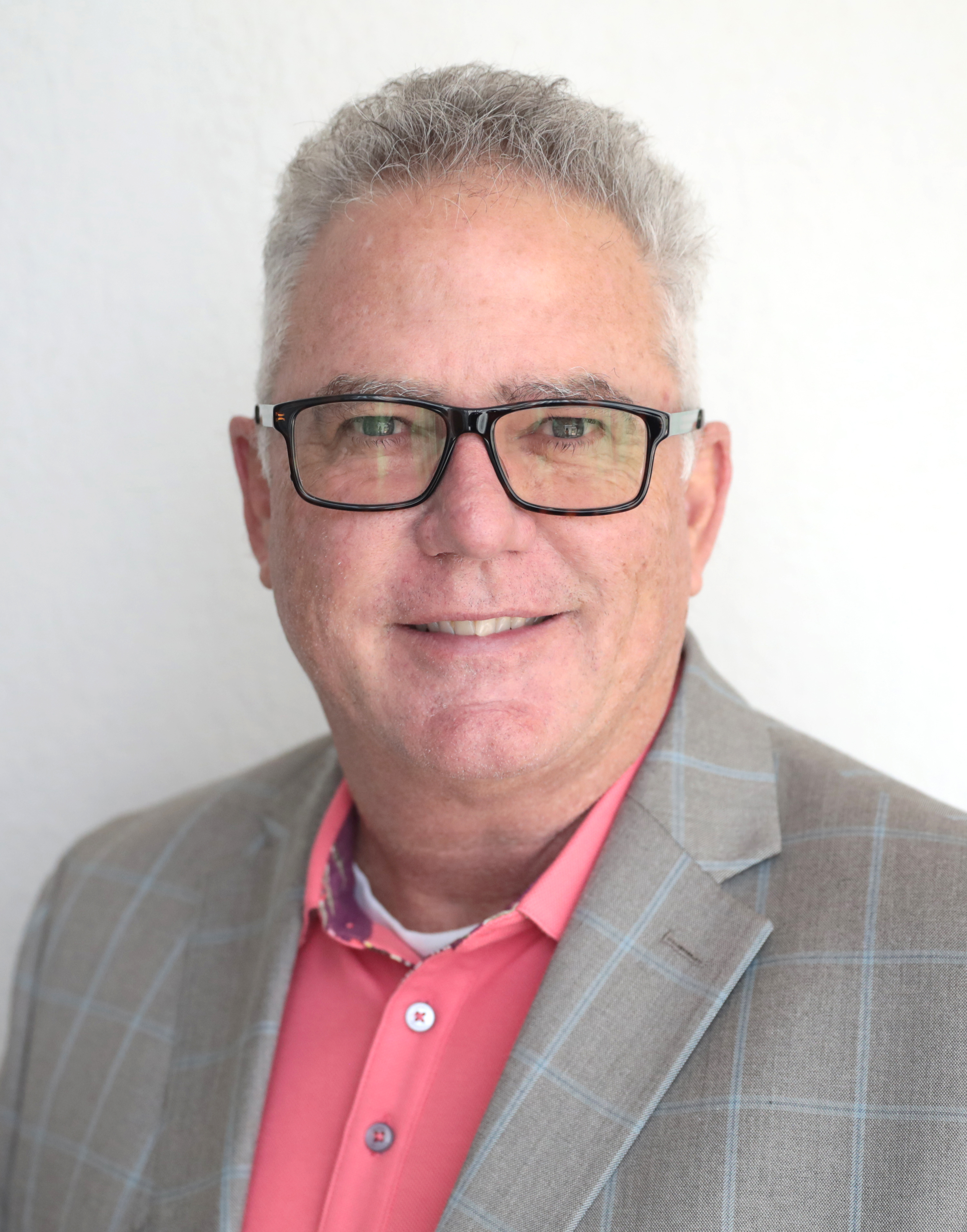

Member of the South Carolina House of Representatives from the 85th district
- Incumbent
- Assumed office November 14, 2022
- Preceded by: Chip Huggins

Personal details
- Born: Fort Myers, Florida
- Party: Republican
- Education: University of South Florida

Jay Kilmartin is an American Republican from South Carolina. Since 2022, he has been a member of the South Carolina House of Representative for the 85th district. He is a member of the South Carolina Freedom Caucus.

Kilmartin is a businessman and restaurateur in Lexington County.
