= Bruce W. Bannister =

American politician

Member of the South Carolina House of Representatives from the 24th district
- Incumbent
- Assumed office January 10, 2006
- Preceded by: David Wilkins

Personal details
- Born: July 21, 1972 (age 54) Greenville, South Carolina, U.S.
- Party: Republican

Bruce W. Bannister (born July 21, 1972) is an American attorney and politician serving as a member of the South Carolina House of Representatives, representing the 24th District, which includes a portion of Greenville County. He is a member of the Republican Party.

== South Carolina House of Representatives ==
Bannister was elected to the state House in the 2004 election, and has served since 2005. From 2008 to 2019, he held the position of Assistant Majority Leader.

== Early life and education ==
Bannister was born in Greenville, South Carolina, to Oscar W. Bannister and Kate Wofford Bannister. He attended Davidson College, where he earned a Bachelor of Arts degree in 1995. He later received his Juris Doctor from the University of South Carolina's Joseph F. Rice School of Law in 1998, where he was a member of the Order of Wig and Robe.

== Career ==
Bannister is the managing partner of Bannister & Wyatt, LLC, a law firm based in Greenville. He is a member of the Greenville County Bar and has been active in professional and civic organizations.

In 2007, he was named to Greenville’s Best and Brightest Under 35. He also completed Leadership Greenville Class XXVI.

Bannister has held several leadership roles within the legal and legislative communities, including:

- Chairman, Lawyer Legislator Task Force (2009)
- Board member, A Child’s Haven (2008–2011)
- Member, Peace Center Board (2009–present)
- Member, Family Law Bench Bar Committee (2008–present)
- Chairman, Criminal Law Subcommittee (2011–present)

== Personal life ==
On June 14, 1997, Bannister married Mary Margaret Adams. They have four children: Bruce W. Bannister Jr., Benjamin A. Bannister, Margaret Kate ("Molly Kate") Bannister, and Caroline Helene Bannister.

He is a member of Christ Church of Greenville.
