= South Carolina House of Representatives =

Lower house of the South Carolina General Assembly

Coordinates: 34°00′01″N 81°01′59″W

- South Carolina General Assembly
- Seal of the South Carolina House of Representatives

Type
- Type: Lower House
- Term limits: None

History
- New session started: January 14, 2025

Leadership
- Speaker: Murrell Smith (R) since May 12, 2022
- Speaker pro tempore: Tommy Pope (R) since December 2, 2014
- Majority Leader: Davey Hiott (R) since May 12, 2022
- Minority Leader: Todd Rutherford (D) since January 8, 2013

Structure
- Seats: 124
- Political groups: Majority: Republican (79); Minority: Democratic (45)
- Length of term: 2 years
- Authority: Article III, South Carolina Constitution
- Salary: $10,400/year + per diem

Elections
- Last election: November 3, 2026
- Next election: November 7, 2028
- Redistricting: Legislative Control

Meeting place
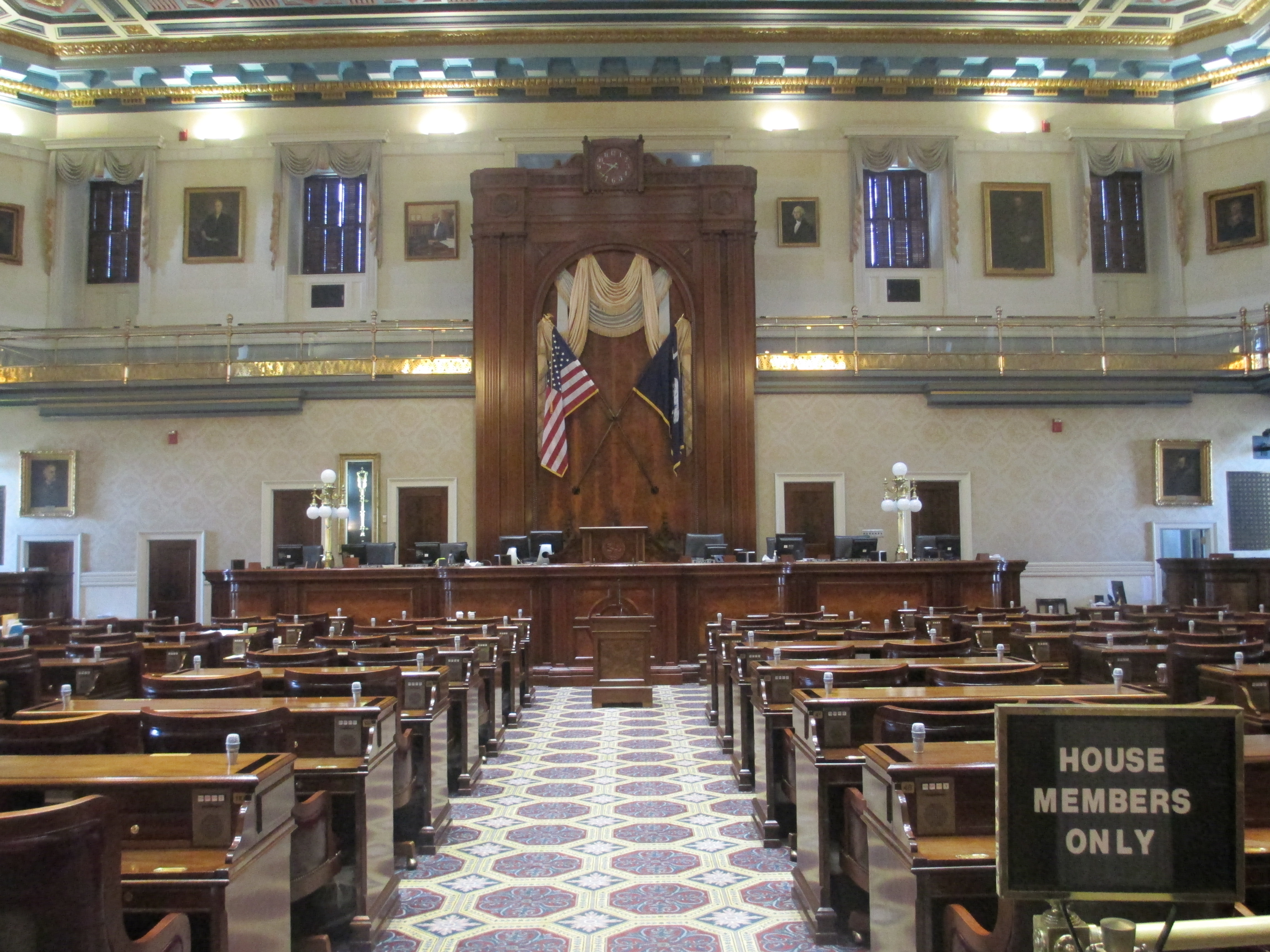
- House of Representatives Chamber; South Carolina State House; Columbia, South Carolina

Website
- South Carolina House of Representatives

Rules
- Rules of the South Carolina House of Representatives

The South Carolina House of Representatives is the lower house of the South Carolina General Assembly. It consists of 124 representatives elected to two-year terms at the same time as U.S. congressional elections.

Unlike many legislatures, seating on the floor is not divided by party, but is arranged by county delegation – a legacy of the original apportionment of the chamber. Until 1964, each of South Carolina's counties was a legislative district, with the number of representatives determined by the county's population. It meets from the second week of January into May.

== History ==
In Colonial times, there was a Commons House of Assembly.

== Qualifications and terms ==
Representatives are considered part-time citizen legislators who serve two-year terms. Representatives are elected at-large by their district, and there are no term limits. Representatives must be 21 years of age before they are eligible to become a representative.

== Composition ==
Affiliation	Party (Shading indicates majority caucus)		Total	Vacant
Affiliation	Republican	Democratic	Total	Vacant
End previous session	89	35	124	0
Begin current session	79	45	124	0
Latest voting share	63.7%	36.3%		

== Leadership ==
South Carolina House of Representatives officers
Position	Name	Party
Speaker	Murrell Smith	Republican
Majority Leader	Davey Hiott	Republican
Minority Leader	Todd Rutherford	Democratic

== Current members ==
District	Representative	Party	Residence	First elected
1	Bill Whitmire	Rep	Walhalla	2002
2	Adam Lewis Duncan	Rep	Seneca	2024
3	Phillip Bowers	Rep	Clemson	2024
4	Davey Hiott	Rep	Pickens	2004
5	Neal Collins	Rep	Easley	2014
6	April Cromer	Rep	Anderson	2022
7	Lee Gilreath	Rep	Belton	2024
8	Don Chapman	Rep	Townville	2022
9	Blake Sanders	Rep	Anderson	2024
10	Thomas Beach	Rep	Piedmont	2022
11	Craig A. Gagnon	Rep	Abbeville	2012
12	Daniel Gibson	Rep	Greenwood	2022
13	John R. McCravy III	Rep	Greenwood	2016
14	Luke Samuel Rankin	Rep	Laurens	2024
15	JA Moore	Dem	North Charleston	2018
16	Mark N. Willis	Rep	Fountain Inn	2008
17	Mike Burns	Rep	Tigerville	2013*
18	Alan Morgan	Rep	Greer	2022*
19	Patrick Haddon	Rep	Greenville	2019*
20	Stephen Frank	Rep	Taylors	2024
21	Dianne Mitchell	Rep	Greenville	2025*
22	Paul Wickensimer	Rep	Greenville	2024
23	Chandra Dillard	Dem	Greenville	2008
24	Bruce W. Bannister	Rep	Greenville	2005*
25	Wendell K. Jones	Dem	Piedmont	2022
26	David Martin	Rep	Fort Mill	2024
27	David Vaughan	Rep	Simpsonville	2022
28	Chris Huff	Rep	Pelzer	2024
29	Dennis Moss	Rep	Gaffney	2006
30	Brian Lawson	Rep	Chesnee	2022
31	Rosalyn Henderson-Myers	Dem	Spartanburg	2017*
32	Scott Montgomery	Rep	Spartanburg	2024
33	Travis Moore	Rep	Roebuck	2020
34	Sarita Edgerton	Rep	Moore	2024
35	Bill Chumley	Rep	Reidville	2010
36	Rob Harris	Rep	Wellford	2022
37	Steven Wayne Long	Rep	Boiling Springs	2016
38	Josiah Magnuson	Rep	Campobello	2016
39	Cal Forrest	Rep	Monetta	2016
40	Joe White	Rep	Prosperity	2022
41	Annie McDaniel	Dem	Winnsboro	2018
42	Doug Gilliam	Rep	Buffalo	2018
43	Randy Ligon	Rep	Rock Hill	2018
44	Mike Neese	Rep	Indian Land	2022
45	Brandon Michael Newton	Rep	Lancaster	2016
46	Heath Sessions	Rep	Rock Hill	2022
47	Tommy Pope	Rep	York	2010
48	Brandon Guffey	Rep	Rock Hill	2022
49	John Richard C. King	Dem	Rock Hill	2008
50	Keishan Scott	Dem	Bishopville	2025*
51	J. David Weeks	Dem	Sumter	2000
52	Jermaine Johnson	Dem	Hopkins	2020
53	Richie Yow	Rep	Chesterfield	2014
54	Jason S. Luck	Dem	Bennettsville	2024
55	Jackie E. Hayes	Dem	Dillon	1998
56	Tim McGinnis	Rep	Myrtle Beach	2018*
57	Lucas Atkinson	Rep	Marion	2016
58	Jeff Johnson	Rep	Conway	2014
59	Terry Alexander	Dem	Florence	2006
60	Phillip Lowe	Rep	Florence	2006
61	Carla Schuessler	Rep	Myrtle Beach	2022
62	Robert Q. Williams	Dem	Darlington	2006
63	Jay Jordan	Rep	Florence	2015*
64	Fawn M. Pedalino	Rep	Turbeville	2022
65	Cody Mitchell	Rep	Hartsville	2022
66	Jackie Terribile	Rep	Tega Cay	2024
67	G. Murrell Smith Jr.	Rep	Sumter	2000
68	Heather Ammons Crawford	Rep	Myrtle Beach	2012*
69	Chris Wooten	Rep	Lexington	2018*
70	Robert Reese	Dem	Hopkins	2024
71	Nathan Ballentine	Rep	Chapin	2004
72	Seth Rose	Dem	Columbia	2018
73	Christopher R. Hart	Dem	Columbia	2006
74	Todd Rutherford	Dem	Columbia	1998
75	Heather Bauer	Dem	Columbia	2022
76	Leon Howard	Dem	Columbia	1994
77	Kambrell Garvin	Dem	Columbia	2018
78	Beth Bernstein	Dem	Columbia	2012
79	Hamilton Grant	Dem	Columbia	2024
80	Katherine D. Landing	Rep	Mount Pleasant	2022
81	Charles Hartz	Rep	Aiken	2024
82	Bill Clyburn	Dem	Aiken	1994
83	Bill Hixon	Rep	North Augusta	2010
84	Melissa Lackey Oremus	Rep	Aiken County	2019*
85	Jay Kilmartin	Rep	Columbia	2022
86	Bill Taylor	Rep	Aiken	2010
87	Paula Rawl Calhoon	Rep	Lexington	2018
88	John Thomas Lastinger	Rep	Springdale	2025*
89	Micah Caskey	Rep	West Columbia	2016
90	Justin Bamberg	Dem	Smoaks	2014
91	Lonnie Hosey	Dem	Barnwell	1999*
92	Brandon Cox	Rep	Goose Creek	2022
93	Jerry Govan	Dem	St. Matthews	2013*
94	Gil Gatch	Rep	Summerville	2020
95	Gilda Cobb-Hunter	Dem	Orangeburg	1992*
96	Ryan McCabe	Rep	Pelion	2020
97	Robby Robbins	Rep	St. George	2022*
98	Greg Ford	Rep		2026*
99	Mark Smith	Rep	Charleston	2020
100	Sylleste Davis	Rep	Moncks Corner	2016*
101	Roger K. Kirby	Dem	Lake City	2014
102	Harriet Holman	Rep	Pineville	2024
103	Carl Anderson	Dem	Georgetown	2004
104	William Bailey	Rep	Little River	2018
105	Kevin Hardee	Rep	Loris	2012
106	Val Guest Jr.	Rep	Myrtle Beach	2022
107	Case Brittain	Rep	Myrtle Beach	2020
108	Lee Hewitt	Rep	Murrells Inlet	2016
109	Tiffany Spann-Wilder	Dem	North Charleston	2024*
110	Tom Hartnett Jr.	Rep	Mount Pleasant	2022
111	Wendell Gilliard	Dem	Charleston	2008
112	Joe Bustos	Rep	Mount Pleasant	2020
113	Courtney Waters	Dem	Charleston	2025*
114	Gary Brewer	Rep	Charleston	2022
115	Spencer Wetmore	Dem	Folly Beach	2020*
116	James Teeple	Rep	Johns Island	2024
117	Jordan S. Pace	Rep	Goose Creek	2022
118	Bill Herbkersman	Rep	Bluffton	2002
119	Leon Stavrinakis	Dem	Charleston	2006
120	Weston J. Newton	Rep	Bluffton	2012
121	Michael F. Rivers Sr.	Dem	St. Helena Island	2016
122	Bill Hager	Rep	Hampton	2022
123	Jeff Bradley	Rep	Hilton Head Island	2014
124	Shannon Erickson	Rep	Beaufort	2007*
125	James John Sempsey IV	Ind	Cowpens	2026

*Member was originally elected in a special election

== Standing committees ==
Committee	Chair
Subcommittee	Chair
Agriculture, Natural Resources & Environmental Affairs	Bill Hixon (R-83)
Agriculture	Bill Chumley (R-35)
Environmental Affairs	Mike Burns (R-17)
Wildlife	Cal Forrest (R-39)
Education and Public Works	Shannon Erickson (R-124)
K-12	Jeff Bradley (R-123)
Higher Education	Tim McGinnis (R-56)
Early Childhood	Stewart Jones (R-14)
Public Safety	Tom Hartnett (R-110)
Transportation	David Vaughan (R-27)
Motor Vehicles	Doug Gilliam (R-14)
Ethics	Jay Jordan (R-63)
Interstate Cooperation	Mark N. Willis (R-16)
Invitations and Memorial Resolutions	Dennis Moss (R-29)
Judiciary	Weston J. Newton (R-45)
Artificial Intelligence, Cybersecurity & Special Laws	Travis Moore (R-33)
Constitutional Laws	Jay Jordan (R-63)
Criminal Laws	Jeff Johnson (R-58)
Family, Business, and Probate Law	Beth Bernstein (D-78)
General Laws	Case Brittain (R-107)
Labor, Commerce and Industry	Bill Herbkersman (R-118)
Banking And Consumer Affairs	Joseph H. Jefferson (D-63)
Real Estate	Anne Thayer (R-9)
Public Utilities	Jay West (R-7)
Insurance	Kevin Hardee (R-105)
Administration and Regulations	Carl Anderson (D-103)
Legislative Oversight	Jeff Johnson (R-58)
Economic Development, Transportation, and Natural Resources	Travis Moore (R-33)
Education and Cultural Affairs	Tim McGinnis (R-56)
Healthcare and Regulatory	Joseph H. Jefferson (D-102)
Law Enforcement, Criminal and Civil Justice	Chris Wooten (R-69)
Medical, Military, Public and Municipal Affairs	Sylleste Davis (R-100)
Medical and Health Affairs	Marvin Smith (R-99)
Military and Veterans Affairs	Bobby Cox (R-21)
Municipal and Public Affairs	Joe Bustos (R-112)
Operations and Management	Patrick Haddon (R-19)
Regulations, Administrative Procedures, Artificial Intelligence, and Cybersecurity Committee	Jeff Bradley (R-123)
Artificial Intelligence	Brandon Guffey (R-48)
Business and Industry	Terry Alexander (D-59)
Education & Administrative	James Teeple (R-117)
Emerging Technologies	JA Moore (D-15)
Environment and Natural Resources	Bill Taylor (R-17)
Health and Healthcare Industries	Carl Anderson (R-103)
Rules	Micah Caskey (R-89)
Ways and Means	Bruce W. Bannister (R-24)
Economic Development	Micah Caskey (R-89)
General Government	Gilda Cobb-Hunter (D-95)
License, Fee and Other Taxes	Todd Rutherford (D-74)
Property Tax	Neal Collins (R-5)
Sales & Use Tax and Income Tax	Brandon Michael Newton (R-45)
Revenue Policy	Bruce W. Bannister (R-24)

== Party composition over time ==
Year	Democratic Party	Republican Party	Independent / Other	Majority
1865	0	0	124	124
1868	14	110	0	96
1870	0	100	24^{(a)}	76
1872	22	102	0	80
1874	0	91	33^{(b)}	58
1876	64	60	0	4
1878	121	3	0	118
1880	120	4	0	116
1882	118	6	0	112
1884	119	5	0	114
1886	120	4	0	116
1888	121	3	0	118
1890	115	9	0	106
1892	120	4	0	116
1894	104	3	17^{(c)}	87
1896– 1900	123	1	0	122
1902– 1960	124	0	0	124
1961	123	1	0	122
1962	124	0	0	124
1964	123	1	0	122
1966	107	17	0	90
1968	119	5	0	114
1970	113	11	0	102
1972	103	21	0	82
1974	108	16	0	92
1976	112	12	0	100
1978	108	16	0	92
1980	108	16	0	92
1982	105	19	0	86
1984	96	28	0	68
1986	92	32	0	60
1988	88	36	0	52
1990	80	44	0	36
1992	74	50	0	24
1994	54	70	0	16
1996	53	71	0	18
1998	57	67	0	10
2000	53	71	0	18
2002	51	73	0	22
2004	50	74	0	24
2006	51	73	0	22
2008	51	73	0	22
2010	48	76	0	28
2012	46	78	0	32
2014	46	78	0	32
2016	44	80	0	36
2018	44	80	0	36
2020	43	81	0	38
2022– 2024 (Note: Effective January 2023)	36	88	0	52

^{(a)} 21 were members of the Union Reform Party of South Carolina and the other 3 were Independents from Anderson. Two of the Union Reform members from Chesterfield were later replaced by Republicans from a resolution passed in the House.
^{(b)} All 33 were members of the Conservative Party of South Carolina.
^{(c)} All 17 were Independent Democrats.

== See also ==
- List of South Carolina state legislatures

== Additional sources ==
- Reynolds, John S. (1969). Reconstruction in South Carolina. Negro University Press. ISBN 0-8371-1638-4.
- Kalk, Bruce H. (2001). The origins of the southern strategy: two-party competition in South Carolina, 1950–1972. Lexington Books. ISBN 0-7391-0242-7.
