= E. A. Smyth (industrialist) =

American industrialist (1847–1942)

Joseph Ellison Adger Smyth
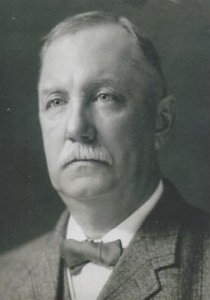
- Smyth pictured in 1912
- Born: October 26, 1847; Charleston, South Carolina, United States
- Died: August 3, 1942 (aged 94)
- Other names: E. A. Smyth
- Occupation: Industrialist
- Known for: Former president of the textile company Pelzer Manufacturing Company

Joseph Ellison Adger Smyth, known as E. A. Smyth (October 26, 1847 – August 3, 1942) was an American industrialist.

== Early life and military service ==
He was the son of Thomas Smyth, minister of Second Presbyterian Church in Charleston, South Carolina. His older brother, James Adger Smyth, later became Mayor of Charleston.

Smyth attended The Citadel until 1864, when he joined the Confederate Army in the Civil War. His gallant service in the Battle of Honey Hill earned him a promotion to sergeant. After the war he became a captain in the Washington Artillery Rifle Club, and used that title for the rest of his life.

== Career ==
He started as a junior clerk in the hardware firm his grandfather, James Adger, had established, but later decided to enter the textile industry. He joined forces with Francis J. Pelzer and served as president of the Pelzer Manufacturing Company in what is now Pelzer, South Carolina from 1880 to 1923. He was also president of Belton Mills from 1899 to 1920, and owned a controlling interest in The Greenville News from 1912 to 1923.

== Personal life ==
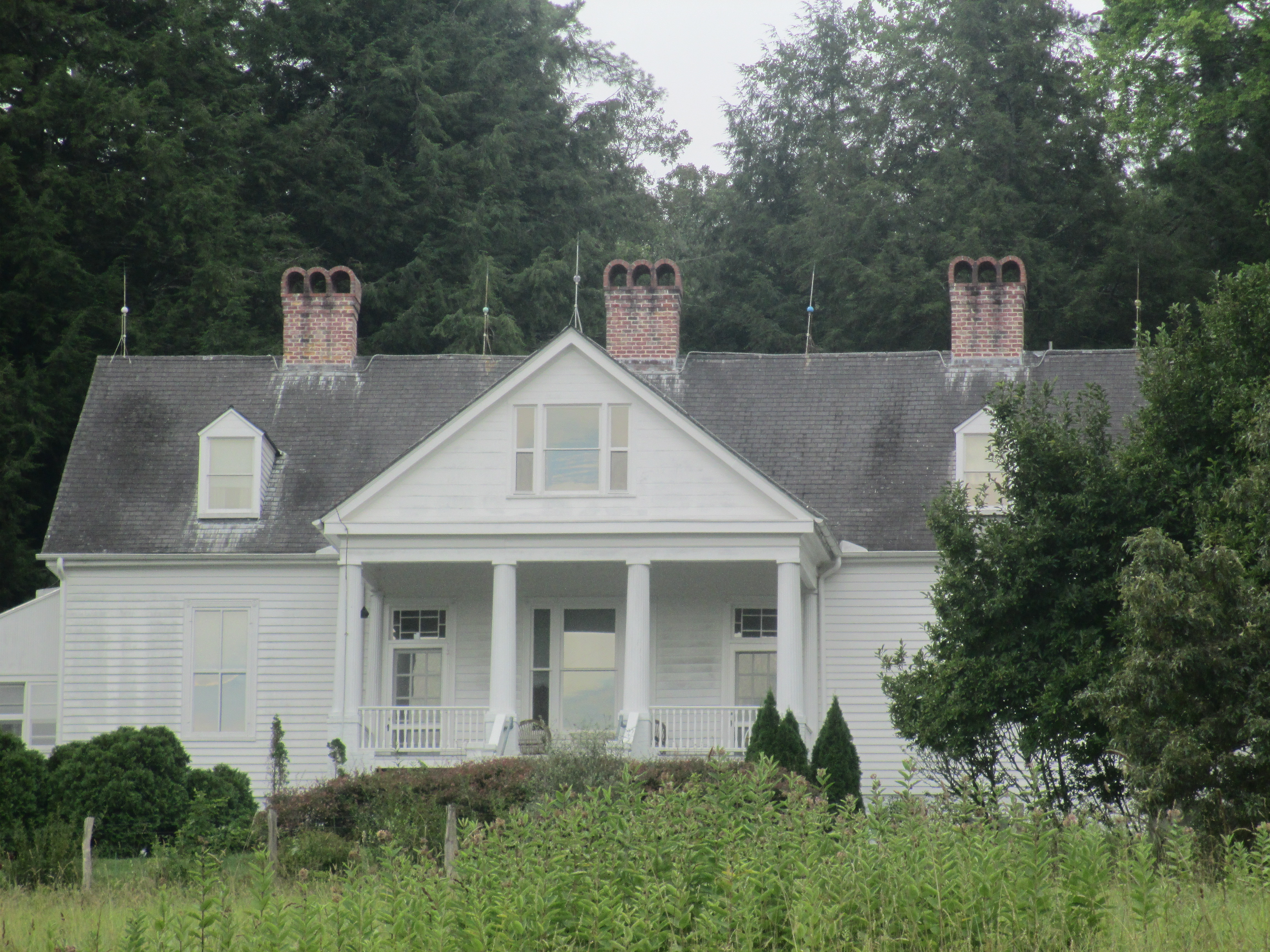
Connemara, Smyth's final home

In 1900, Smyth purchased a house in Flat Rock, North Carolina. He changed the name from "Rock Hill" to "Connemara". He owned it for the rest of his life, and in 1945 it was purchased by Carl Sandburg.
