= E. A. Smyth (entomologist) =

American entomologist

Biographical details
- Born: October 26, 1863; Summerton, South Carolina, U.S.
- Died: August 19, 1941 (aged 77) near Salem, Virginia, U.S.

Coaching career (HC unless noted)
- 1892–1893: VAMC

Head coaching record
- Overall: 1–3

Ellison Adger Smyth Jr. (October 26, 1863 – August 19, 1941) was an American professor of zoology, scientific collector, and college football coach.

Smyth was the son of James Adger Smyth, who later became Mayor of Charleston, and the grandson of Thomas Smyth, minister of Charleston's Second Presbyterian Church. He studied at Princeton College, Columbia College, and the University of Virginia. Smyth worked as a clerk in a law firm before taking up a position as adjunct professor of biology at the University of South Carolina in 1889. He became a professor of biology at Virginia Tech in 1891.

Smyth was the creator and first head coach of the Virginia Tech Hokies football program. He coached the team in the 1892 and 1893 college football seasons. In addition to his athletic career, he was a professor and founding head of the biology department (1891–1925) and the first Dean of the Faculty (1902–1906) at Virginia Tech. Smyth Hall, home of the Department of Crop and Soil Environmental Science at Virginia Tech, is named in his honor.

Smyth discovered and named two new species of butterflies and moths, and was a member of the New York Entomological Society. He was also an elder in the Presbyterian church in Blacksburg, Virginia.

== Head coaching record ==
Year	Team	Overall	Conference	Standing	Bowl/playoffs
VAMC (Independent) (1892–1893)
1892	VAMC	1–1			
1893	VAMC	0–2			
VAMC:		1–3			
Total:		1–3			
