= Adger =

Adger may refer to:

== Places ==
- Adger, Alabama
- Adger, South Carolina
- Lake Adger, a mountain lake in Polk County, North Carolina

== People ==
- Adger (given name)
- Adger (surname)

== Other uses ==
- USS James Adger, a 1851 sidewheel steamer
