= Hannah Enston Building =

American commercial building in South Carolina

Coordinates: 32.778699°N 79.933273°W

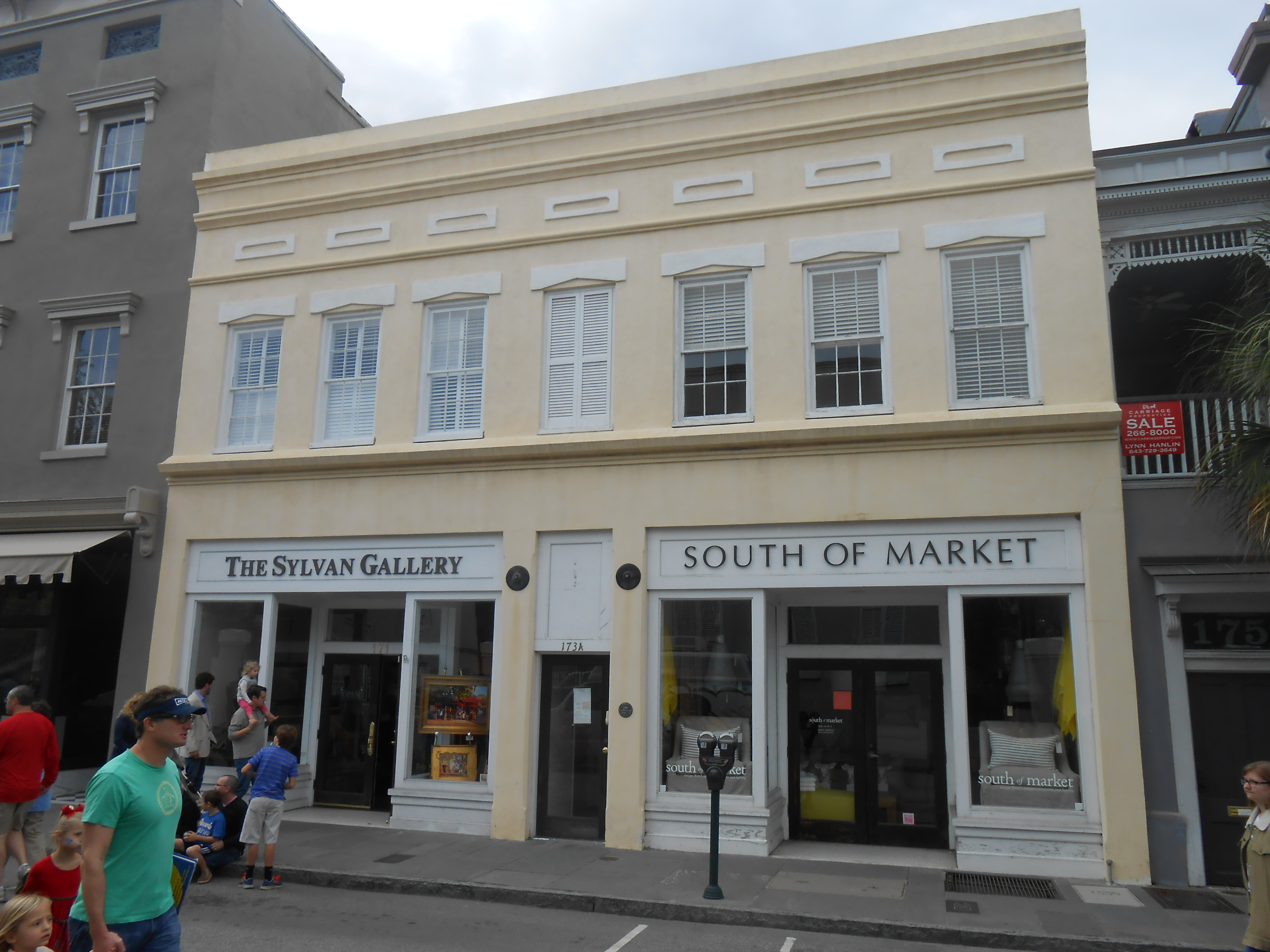
The Hannah Enston Building at 171-173 King St., Charleston, South Carolina.

The Hannah Enston Building is a post-bellum commercial building at 171-173 King St., Charleston, South Carolina. A former building, constructed for furniture dealer William Enston, was burned in a fire in 1861. The replacement building was in place by 1872 when it was included in a bird's eye view map of Charleston. The building was built in the Gothic Revival style with similar decorative elements to 187-189-191 King St., a building built for William Enston sometime after 1848.

After the death of William Enston, his property eventually was received by the trustees of a charity which he created to build the William Enston Home, and the trustees sold 171-173 King St. in 1888. From 1888 to 1909, the two halves of the building were separately owned. The southern portion of the building at 171 King St. was operated as a grocery by George Mazo; his son, writer Earl Mazo, and the rest of the family lived on the second floor.

Henry Rider Dearing and his wife Pauline Rowland Dearing apparently resided in the northern portion of the building in 1900. Birth records for Charleston indicate Pauline gave birth to a daughter (unknown first name) at 173 King Street on October 6, 1900. The records state Henry was a plumber.
