= Senator Pillsbury =

Senator Pillsbury may refer to:

- Albert E. Pillsbury (1849–1930), Massachusetts State Senate
- Charles Alfred Pillsbury (1842–1899), Minnesota State Senate
- George S. Pillsbury (1921–2012), Minnesota State Senate
- Gilbert Pillsbury (1813–1893), Massachusetts State Senate
- John S. Pillsbury (1827–1901), Minnesota State Senate
