= William Ashmead Courtenay =

Mayor of Charleston

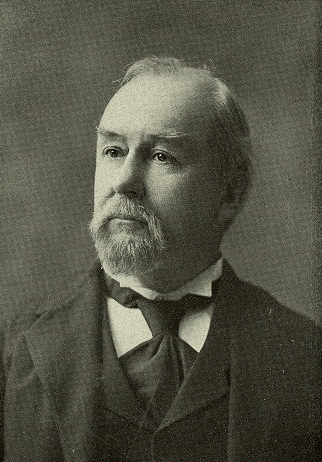

46th Mayor of Charleston
- In office 1879–1887
- Preceded by: William W. Sale
- Succeeded by: George D. Bryan

Personal details
- Born: February 4, 1831 Charleston, South Carolina, US
- Died: March 17, 1908 (aged 77) Columbia, South Carolina, US
- Party: Democrat
- Spouse: Julia Ann Francis
- Children: 6
- Profession: Publisher and journalist

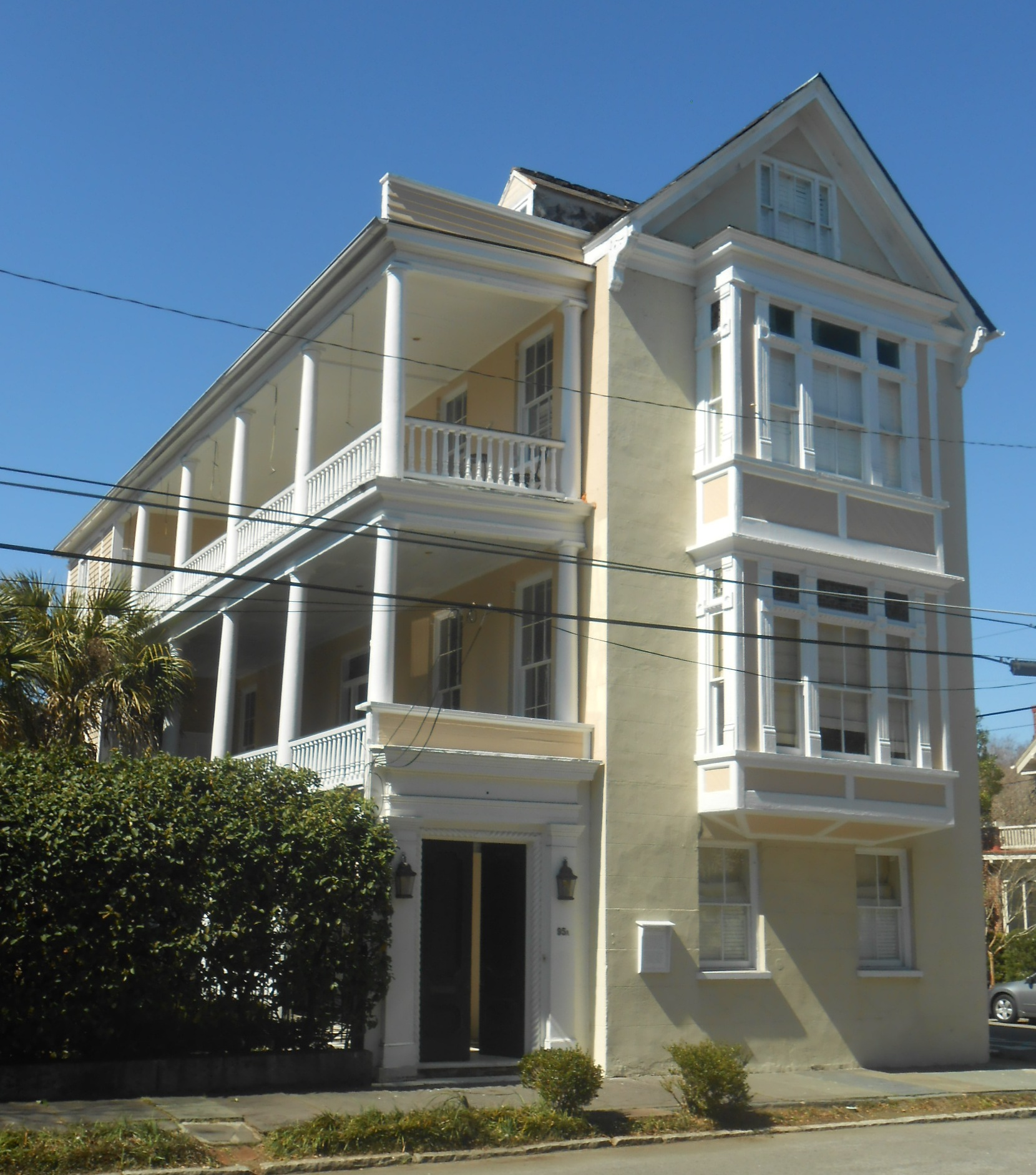
Mayor Courtenay lived at 95 Ashley Avenue in Charleston, South Carolina while serving as mayor of the city

William Ashmead Courtenay was the forty-sixth mayor of Charleston, South Carolina, serving two terms from 1879 to 1887.

== Early life ==
Courtenay was born on February 4, 1831, a son of Edward Smith Courtenay and Elizabeth Storer Wade. He attended the Classical and English Academy of Dr. J. C. Faber until he turned fifteen.

From 1850 to 1860 he was occupied in the publishing and book selling business. In 1860, he accepted a position as the business manager for the Charleston Mercury, a leading political newspaper of South Carolina.

== Civil War ==
Courtenay joined the Confederate military in 1861 and served throughout the American Civil War. He contributed to the Charleston Mercury as a war correspondent.

Following the war, Courtenay was destitute, and he worked in Newberry, South Carolina, shuttling materials via wagon to replace the trains that had been damaged during the Civil War.

== Later life ==
Courtenay returned to Charleston in 1866 and started a shipping business. When he was elected in 1879 as mayor, he worked to systematize and simplify city government. He pushed an amendment to the city charter which practically forbade any new debt by the city. He expressed his beliefs on the matter thus: "The money which we handle belongs to the people and not to us. We can only take it from them for legitimate expenses of government. More than this is a robbery. Official generosity is official crime." He ran unopposed in 1883.

In addition to reform of city finances, Courtenay had other accomplishments. He oversaw the final settlement of a bequest from William Enston which was finally used for the creation of the William Enston Home. He changed the Charleston fire department from a volunteer force to a paid department.

After leaving political office, he established the Courtenay Manufacturing Company in Newry, South Carolina. He was also a member of the South Carolina Historical Commission which oversaw the state's historic archives.

Courtenay died on March 17, 1908, at his home on Pendleton Street, Columbia, South Carolina. His body was returned to Charleston for burial at Magnolia Cemetery.

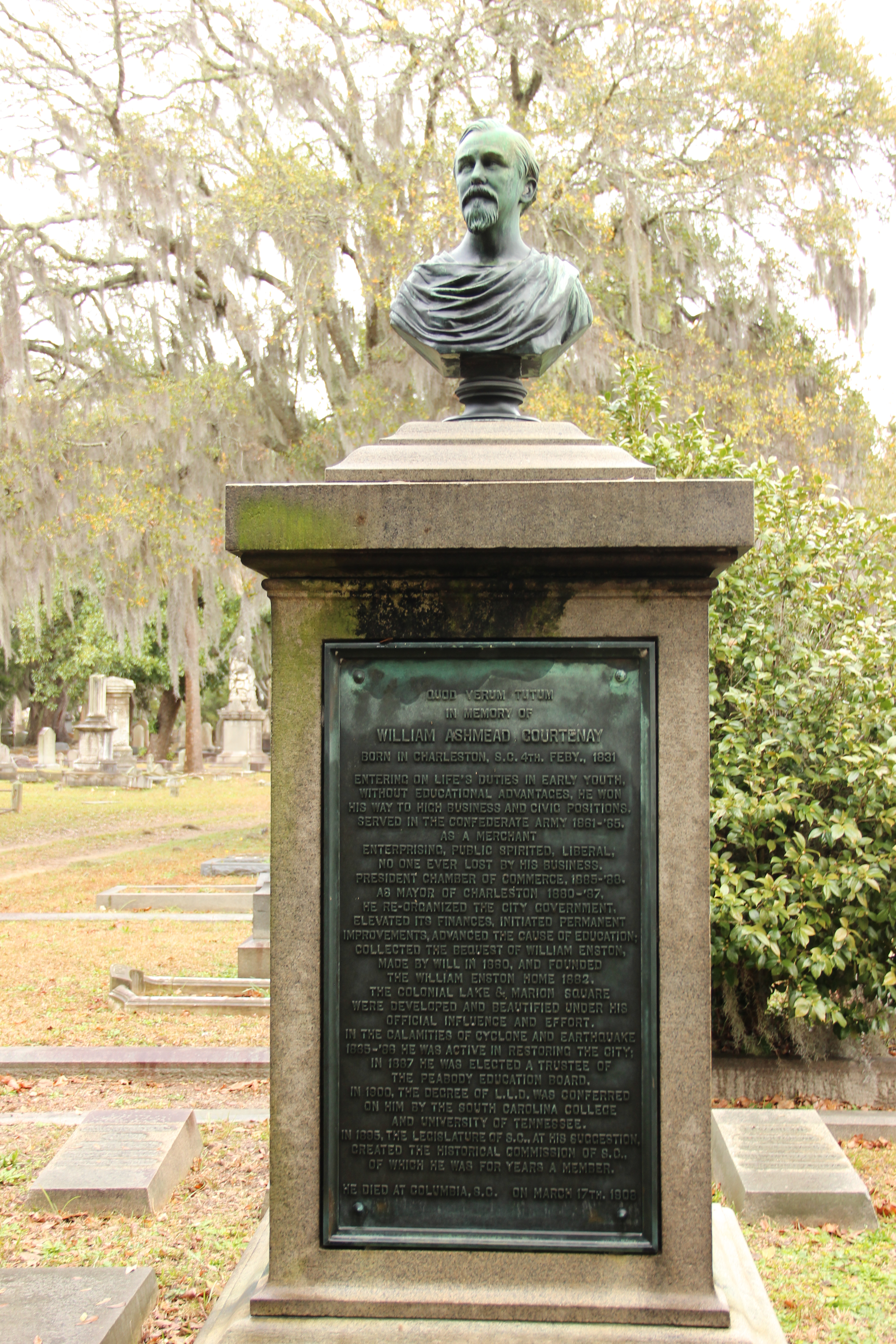
Courtenay's burial site in Magnolia Cemetery

Courtenay Middle School on upper Meeting Street, Charleston, South Carolina was named in his honor.

Political offices
Preceded by William W. Sale	Mayor of Charleston, South Carolina; 1879–1887	Succeeded by George D. Bryan
