= Adger (given name) =

Adger is a given name. Notable people with the name include:

- Adger Armstrong (born 1957), American football player
- Adger Cowans (born 1936), American photographer and painter
- Adger M. Pace (1882–1959), American hymn writer

== See also ==
- Adger (surname)
- Adger (disambiguation)
