= George I. Cunningham =

Mayor of Charleston

George Irvin Cunningham

44th Mayor of Charleston
- In office 1873–1877
- Preceded by: Johann Andreas Wagener
- Succeeded by: William W. Sale

Personal details
- Born: September 8, 1835 Monroe County, Tennessee, US
- Died: November 29, 1902 (aged 67) Charleston, South Carolina, US
- Party: Republican

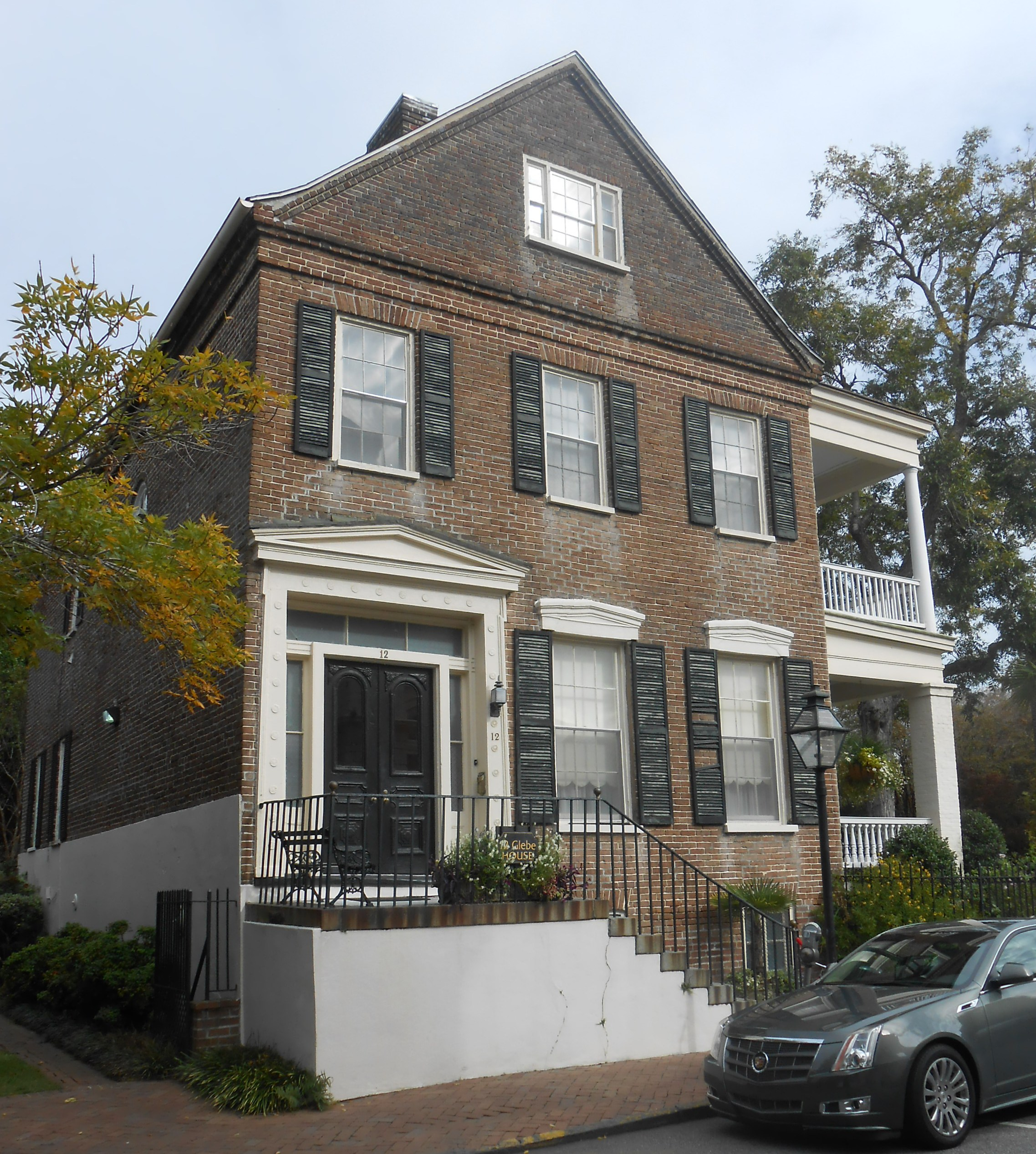
During his tenure as mayor of Charleston, Cunningham lived at 12 Glebe Street.

George I. Cunningham (1835-1902) was the forty-fourth mayor of Charleston, South Carolina, serving two terms from 1873 to 1877. Cunningham was born in Monroe County, Tennessee to Abner Cunningham and Celia Stephens. He served as the Chairman of the Charleston County Commissioners in 1872 and president of Charleston Waterworks Co. He was appointed a United States marshal in 1879. He was also the postmaster of Charleston. He died on November 29, 1902.

Cunningham was the last Republican to serve as mayor of Charleston until William S. Cogswell Jr. was elected in 2023 and was sworn in in January 2024.

Political offices
Preceded by Johann Andreas Wagener	Mayor of Charleston, South Carolina; 1873–1877	Succeeded by William W. Sale
