= Tecklenburg (surname) =

Tecklenburg is a German habitational surname from a place so called in North Rhine-Westphalia. Notable people with the surname include:

- John Tecklenburg (born 1955), American businessman and politician
- Martina Voss-Tecklenburg (born 1967), retired German football midfielder
- Sam Tecklenburg (born 1997), American football center
- Warwick Tecklenburg (born 1987), former South African rugby union player
