= Adger (surname) =

Adger is a surname. Notable people with the surname include:

- David Adger (born 1967), Scottish linguist
- John Bailey Adger (1810–1899), American missionary and preacher
- James Adger Smyth (1837–1920), American politician
- Neil Adger (born 1964), British geographer
- Robert Adger Law (1879–1961), American literary historian
