= The Greenville News =

Newspaper in Greenville, South Carolina, US

- The January 22, 2012 front page of The Greenville News
- Type: Daily newspaper
- Format: Broadsheet
- Owner: USA Today Co.
- Editor: Leisa Richardson
- Founded: 1874
- Headquarters: 32 East Broad Street; Greenville South Carolina 29601; United States
- Circulation: 43,288 daily 63,745 Sunday (as of 2014)
- Website: greenvilleonline.com

The Greenville News is a daily morning newspaper published in Greenville, South Carolina. After The State in Columbia and Charleston's The Post and Courier, it is the third largest paper in South Carolina.

== History ==
The Greenville News started off as a four-page publication in 1874 by A.M. Speights. For a one-year subscription, the cost was eight dollars. After five different owners and many editors, the Peace family under the leadership of Bony Hampton Peace bought the paper in 1919 from Ellison Adger Smyth, around the same time that Greenville was becoming known as "The Textile Center of the South." The Peace family acquired the evening paper The Piedmont in 1927. In 1965 both papers helped to form Multimedia Inc. Then in 1995, the smaller afternoon paper and the larger morning paper merged to become The News-Piedmont. In December 1995 Gannett purchased Multimedia, changing the newspaper name back to The Greenville News. Today The News prints over 50,000 newspapers a day.

== Publications ==
In addition to The Greenville News, the company publishes eGreenville, which features local entertainment, news, photos, and reviews. A free publication, it is available at more than 1,100 locations in Anderson, Greenville, Pickens and Spartanburg counties.

== Awards ==
- 1977 Penney-Missouri Award for General Excellence (The Piedmont)

== Notable staff ==
- Daisy Hendley Gold, author and journalist
- Paul K. Martin, NASA Inspector General
- Bill Workman, former mayor of Greenville
