= George Washington Clark =

American politician

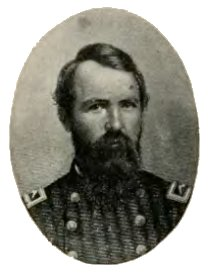

41st Mayor of Charleston
- In office 1868–1869
- Preceded by: Milton Cogswell
- Succeeded by: Gilbert Pillsbury

Personal details
- Born: December 26, 1834 Indiana, US
- Died: May 22, 1898 (aged 63) Washington, D.C., US
- Spouse: Sara Robinson Clark (1855–95)
- Children: Eleanor G.A. Clark Speer (d. 1918); Edith K.O. Clark (1881–1936); Clifford Robinson Clark (1882–1918)
- Education: Wabash College

George Washington Clark (1834–1898) was the forty-first mayor of Charleston, South Carolina, serving from 1868 until 1869 when the South Carolina Supreme Court confirmed the validity of the election he lost to Gilbert Pillsbury.

Clark was born on December 26, 1834, in Indiana; married Sara Robinson; and died on May 22, 1898, in Washington, D.C. He is buried at Arlington National Cemetery.

Clark was appointed colonel of the 34th Iowa Infantry Regiment during the American Civil War. He led his regiment during the Vicksburg Campaign, Battle of Brownsville, and Battle of Fort Blakeley. He was in command of a brigade at the siege of Fort Morgan during the Battle of Mobile Bay.

Clark was appointed mayor by General E.R.S. Canby, commander of the Second Military District, on July 6, 1868. Following an election that same year against Gilbert Pillsbury, he refused to leave office. In March 1869, Pillsbury arrived at City Hall and demanded that Clark surrender his office. When Clark refused (he claimed that the statehouse had lacked authority to adopt laws about the local elections), Pillsbury sought an arrest warrant, which was issued. On March 5, 1869, Clark was arrested on the misdemeanor charge of continuing to hold office in spite of the statehouse's recent vote. Clark arrived at the magistrate's office and, with the backing of business leaders, posted a $3000 recognizance bond and left.

Finally, after the South Carolina Supreme Court ruled against him in an election dispute, in May 1869, he was replaced by Pillsbury in office.

Preceded by Milton Cogswell	Mayor of Charleston, South Carolina; 1868–1869	Succeeded by Gilbert Pillsbury
