= 42nd New York Infantry Regiment =

- Active: August 30, 1861 – October 11, 1864
- Country: United States of America
- Allegiance: Union
- Branch: United States Army
- Type: Infantry
- Role: Infantry
- Nickname: Tammany Jackson Guard
- Engagements: Lee's Mill: Williamsburg; Seven Days Battles; Antietam; Chancellorsville; Deep Run; Gettysburg; Rappahannock Station; Locust Grove; Auburn; Mine Run; Wilderness; Spotsylvania Courthouse; Cold Harbor; Petersburg; Sailor's Creek; Appomattox

The 42nd New York Infantry Regiment, also called the Tammany Regiment, was a regiment of the Union Army during the American Civil War which was formed up in mid-1861 and mustered in on June 22, 1861. It was organized by the Tammany Club, a New York Democratic Party club.

== Service ==
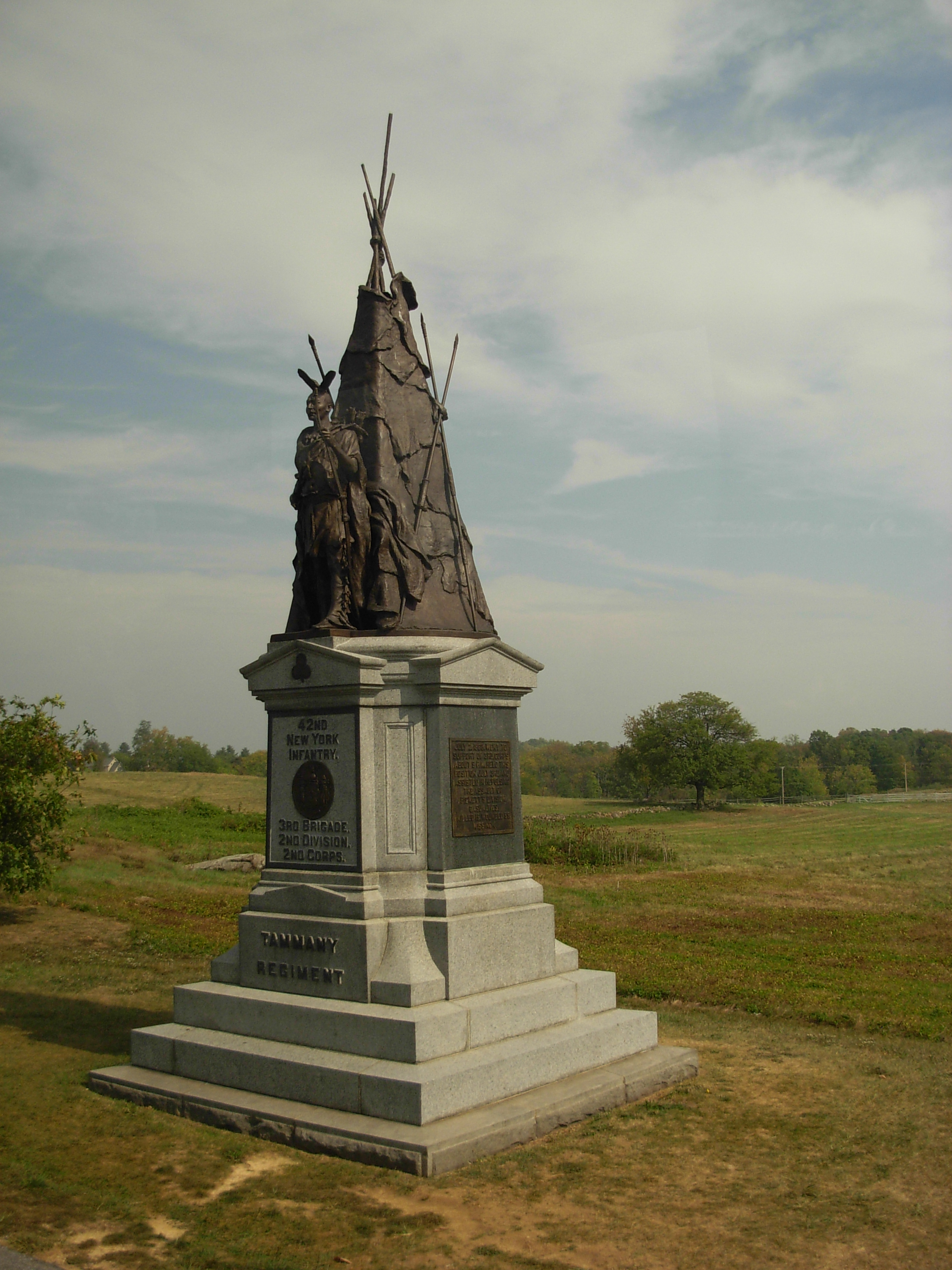
42nd NY Infantry Monument at Gettysburg

Organized at Great Neck and mustered in June 22, 1861. Left State for Washington, D.C., July 18. Attached to Stone's Brigade, Division of the Potomac, October, 1861. Gorman's Brigade, Stone's Division, Army of the Potomac, to January, 1862. Burns' Brigade, Sedgwick's Division, Army of the Potomac, to March, 1862. 3rd Brigade, 2nd Division, 2nd Army Corps, Army of the Potomac, to March, 1864. 1st Brigade, 2nd Division, 2nd Army Corps, to July, 1864.

SERVICE.--Duty in the Defenses of Washington, D. C., until October, and on Upper Potomac to March, 1862. Operations on the Upper Potomac October 21–24, 1861. Action at Ball's Bluff October 21. Moved to Harper's Ferry, W. Va., thence to Charlestown and Berryville, Va., March 7–13, 1862. Movement toward Winchester and return to Bolivar Heights March 13–15. Moved to Fortress Monroe March 22 – April 1. Siege of Yorktown April 5 – May 4. Battle of Seven Pines or Fair Oaks May 31 – June 1. Tunstall Station June 14. Seven days before Richmond June 25 – July 1. Battles of Peach Orchard and Savage Station June 29; White Oak Swamp and Glendale June 30; Malvern Hill July 1. At Harrison's Landing until August 16. Movement to Alexandria August 16–28, thence march to Fairfax Court House August 28–31, and cover retreat of Pope's army to Washington August 31 – September 2. Maryland Campaign September 6–22. Battle of Antietam September 16–17. Moved to Harper's Ferry, W. Va., September 22, and duty there until October 30. Reconnaissance to Charlestown October 16–17. Advance up Loudoun Valley and movement to Falmouth, Va., October 30 – November 17. Battle of Fredericksburg, Va., December 12–15. "Mud March" January 20–24, 1863. At Falmouth until April. Chancellorsville Campaign April 27 – May 6. Battle of Maryes Heights, Fredericksburg, May 3. Salem Heights May 3–4.

Banks' Ford May 4. Gettysburg (Pa.) Campaign June 11 – July 24. Battle of Gettysburg, Pa., July 1–4. Pursuit of Lee July 5–24. Duty on line of the Rappahannock until October. Advance from the Rappahannock to the Rapidan September 13–17. Bristoe Campaign October 9–22. Bristoe Station October 14. Advance to line of the Rappahannock November 7–8. Mine Run Campaign November 26 – December 2. Demonstration on the Rapidan February 6–7, 1864. At Stevensburg until May. Campaign from the Rapidan to the James May 3 – June 15. Battles of the Wilderness May 5–7; Laurel Hill May 8; Spottsylvania May 8–12; Po River May 10; Spottsylvania Court House May 12–21. Assault on the Salient or "Bloody Angle" May 12. North Anna River May 28–26. On line of the Pamunkey May 26–28. Totopotomoy May 28–31. Cold Harbor June 1–12. Before Petersburg June 16–18. Siege of Petersburg June 16 to July 13. Jerusalem Plank Road June 22–23.

Mustered out July 13, 1865. Veterans and Recruits transferred to 82nd Regiment New York Infantry.

Regiment lost during service 11 Officers and 141 Enlisted men killed and mortally wounded and 1 Officer and 103 Enlisted men by disease. Total 256.

== Commanders ==
- Col. James E. Mallon was promoted Colonel of the Regiment on 17 March 1863 and led them at Gettysburg. Colonel Mallon was acting in command of the Third Brigade, Webb's 2nd Division, 2nd Army Corps at Bristoe Station, where he was killed in action on 14 October 1863.
- Col. Milton Cogswell
- Captain David Hogg Company I
- Ltc. George N. Bomford Promoted Lieutenant Colonel of the Regiment August 2, 1862, Led the Regiment at Antietam, until Wounded, Then at the Time Major James E. Mallon Took over.

== See also ==
- List of New York Civil War regiments
