= Chip Limehouse =

American politician

Member of the South Carolina House of Representatives from the 110th district
- In office January 1995 – January 2016
- Preceded by: James J. "Jimmy" Bailey
- Succeeded by: William S. Cogswell Jr.

Personal details
- Born: August 8, 1962 (age 64) Charleston, South Carolina, U.S.
- Party: Republican
- Education: University of South Carolina
- Occupation: Real estate broker

Harry B. "Chip" Limehouse III (born August 8, 1962) is an American politician from the state of South Carolina. A member of the Republican Party, Limehouse is a former member of the South Carolina House of Representatives, representing District 110.

== Political career ==
Limehouse was elected to represent the 110th district in the South Carolina House of Representatives in 1994, taking office in 1995.

Limehouse ran for the United States House of Representatives in the 2013 special election to represent South Carolina's 1st congressional district. He lost the Republican primary to Mark Sanford.

In October 2015, Limehouse announced that he would not be seeking re-election. He was succeeded in 2016 by William S. Cogswell Jr.

In 2018, Limehouse appeared on Sacha Baron Cohen's Who is America? being interviewed alongside rapper Bone Crusher. He stated he was paid to appear in the interview and did not take it seriously.

== Personal life ==
Limehouse attended the University of South Carolina. While there, he played on the polo team. He has honorary doctorates from the College of Charleston, the Medical University of South Carolina, and The Citadel.

His father, Harry Limehouse, Jr., was a campaign director for the Republican National Committee. He ran for the Republican nomination to the United States House of Representatives in the 1st congressional district special election in 1971.

Limehouse is a real estate broker, and owns Limehouse Properties, a family business.

In 2016 Limehouse’s wife filed for divorce citing adultery. He fathered a child with another woman. This scandal led him to resign from the House of Representatives in the same year.
