= Johann Andreas Wagener =

American politician

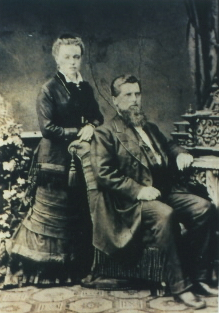

43rd Mayor of Charleston
- In office 1871–1873
- Preceded by: Gilbert Pillsbury
- Succeeded by: George I. Cunningham

Personal details
- Born: July 21, 1816 Sievern, Hanover, Germany
- Died: August 27, 1876 (aged 60) Walhalla, South Carolina
- Party: Democrat
- Profession: Merchant

Military service
- Allegiance: Confederate States of America
- Branch/service: Confederate States Army
- Years of service: 1861–1865
- Rank: Colonel (CSA); Brigadier General (SC Militia)
- Commands: 1st South Carolina Artillery (Militia)
- Battles/wars: American Civil War: Battle of Port Royal

Johann Andreas Wagener (1816-1876) was the forty-third mayor of Charleston, South Carolina, serving one term from 1871 to 1873. He also served as an officer in the Confederate States Army during the American Civil War.

== Biography ==
Wagener was born in Sievern / Bremerhaven on July 21, 1816, and baptized July 24 in Debstedt / Bremerhaven. He immigrated from Germany to New York in 1831 and worked as a store clerk. In 1833, he relocated to Charleston, South Carolina, where he began using the first name "John." He founded the first German-language newspaper of the South. Among the many social organizations founded by Wagener were the German Jägerkorps (1836); the Deutsche Feuerwehr-Compagnie of Charleston (1838, German Fire Company) whose president he was until 1850; and the Teutonenbund (1843), a literary and musical society from which the Freundschaftsbund emanated (1853). In April 1844 he became the editor of the German-language newspaper Der Teutone.

Wagener's most lasting work was the founding of the city of Walhalla, South Carolina. In October 1848, the same year in which he was accepted as member of the venerable German Friendly Society, he held the first meeting of the German Colonization Society. In December 1849, 17,859 acres were purchased in the Pickens District, and the town was carefully laid out with a public square.

At the commencement of the Civil War, Col. J.A. Wagener was in charge of the First Artillery regiment which consisted almost entirely of Germans. Ordered to defend Port Royal harbor. They built Fort Walker on Hilton Head island and defended it on November 7, 1861, until their gunpowder ran out. After the war John A. Wagener was commissioned Brigadier-General by Governor James L. Orr and Fort Wagener on Morris Island was named after him.

In 1871, Wagener was elected mayor of Charleston. The election was held on August 2, 1871, and Wagener won by more than 800 votes. Members of the opposition, however, claimed irregularities had occurred involving poll managers. State law at that time required election contests to be head by Charleston's city council, and a contest was filed. However, city council did not meet because of a lack of a quorum. Eventually, the opposition was granted a writ of mandamus by a state judge that ordered city council to meet on October 25, 1871, to hear the contest. A quorum was again lacking on October 25, 1871, so the case was heard by the judge in Columbia, South Carolina on October 28, 1871. The argument of city council turned mainly on procedural issues about the filing of the case in court. At the end of the proceeding, Judge Graham ruled against the election protesters and dismissed the action.

He lived at the corner of St. Philip Street and McBride's Lane.

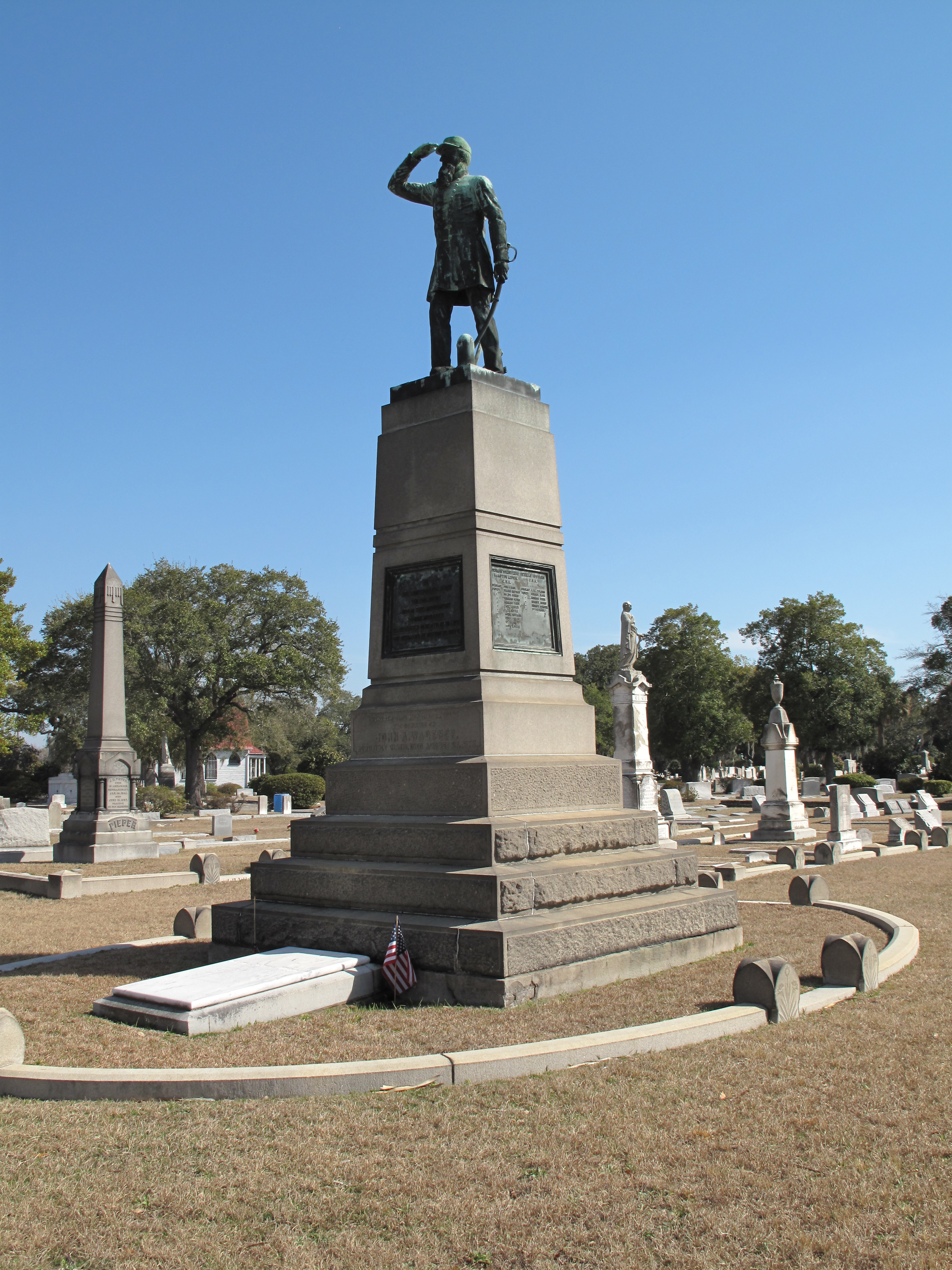
Grave at Bethany Cemetery.

Wagener died in Walhalla, South Carolina, on August 27, 1876.

Political offices
Preceded by Gilbert Pillsbury	Mayor of Charleston, South Carolina; 1871–1873	Succeeded by George I. Cunningham
