= Earl Mazo =

American journalist (1919–2007)

- Mazo pictured during World War II
- Born: July 7, 1919; Warsaw, Poland
- Died: February 17, 2007 (aged 87); Bethesda, Maryland, U.S.
- Education: Clemson University
- Occupation: Journalist

Earl Mazo (July 7, 1919 – February 17, 2007) was an American journalist, author, and government official.

== Early life ==
Born in Warsaw, Poland, Mazo emigrated to the United States as a small child with his parents, Sonia and George Mazo. The Mazos settled in Charleston, South Carolina, where they lived in the Hannah Enston Building. Mazo would later graduate from Clemson University. During World War II, he served as a public relations officer with the U.S. Army Air Force's 385th Bomb Group and was stationed in the United Kingdom.

== Career ==
In the first week of May 1943, Mazo crossed the Atlantic Ocean at age 24 as a second lieutenant and a trained bombardier in the US Army Air Corps. He survived a remarkable 32 missions over Europe in the rickety but reliable B-17s of the era, remarkable because the standard task was 25 missions. By the time Earl signed on for a second round, only 27 of the original 225 men in his wing remained alive. The records show a stunning number KIA—Killed in Action—while others were wounded or missing "somewhere in France" or in German prison camps. Mazo stopped at 32 missions because the military offered him the opportunity to become a staff writer for Stars and Stripes, the newspaper published by the army in all theatres of action. Mazo had been a journalist in Greenville, South Carolina, when the war began before joining up in the spring of 1942. Having seen Europe from the skies in a B-17, Mazo was then deployed on the ground in France on D-Day plus 12 (12 days after D-Day) and accompanied Patton's Third Army across France into Germany.

Mazo reported for Stars and Stripes, the New York Herald Tribune, The New York Times, the Reader's Digest, and served for one year during the presidency of Harry S. Truman as a deputy assistant secretary of defense. In later life, Mazo was employed as head of the professional staff of the United States Congress Joint Committee on Printing. In 1959, Mazo authored a biography of Richard Nixon titled Richard Nixon: A Political and Personal Portrait. The following year, he published a series of exposés on serious voter fraud he believed had cost Nixon the 1960 United States presidential election. His reports prompted a failed attempt by Nixon to convince Mazo to cease his reporting, followed by a successful appeal by Nixon to Mazo's editors to terminate the series of stories on the grounds that the United States could not afford a constitutional crisis at the height of the Cold War. Four parts of what had been originally slated as a twelve part series were published in Mazo's paper, the New York Herald Tribune; those articles then received wide circulation in reprints among newspapers across the nation. Nixon allegedly said to Mazo that "our country can't afford the agony of a constitutional crisis – and I damn well will not be a party to creating one, just to become president or anything else". Mazo was both stunned and disappointed at the decision, adding that he believed the series would have put him in contention for the Pulitzer Prize.

== Personal life and death ==
Mazo was married to his first wife, Rita Vane Mazo, for 62 years until her death in 2003. They had two children: A daughter, Judith, and a son, Mark. In November 2005, he remarried, at age 86, to Regina Schatz, age 79, whose first husband had died. Mazo died at a hospital on February 17, 2007, in Bethesda, Maryland, from complications resulting from a fall at his home in Chevy Chase, Maryland.

== Selected bibliography ==
- Richard Nixon: A Political and Personal Portrait. New York: Harper. 1959. OCLC 456557.
