= Milton Cogswell =

United States Army officer (1825–1882)

40th Mayor of Charleston
- In office March 9, 1868 – 1868
- Preceded by: William Wallace Burns
- Succeeded by: George Washington Clark

Personal details
- Born: December 4, 1825 Noblesville, Indiana, US
- Died: November 20, 1882 (aged 56) Washington, D.C., US
- Resting place: Arlington National Cemetery
- Education: United States Military Academy

Military service
- Allegiance: United States; Union
- Branch/service: United States Army; Union Army
- Years of service: 1849–1871
- Rank: Major, USA; Colonel, USV; Bvt. Brigadier General
- Unit: 4th United States Infantry; 8th U.S. Infantry; 21st U.S. Infantry
- Commands: 42nd New York Infantry; 2nd New York Heavy Artillery
- Battles/wars: American Indian Wars; American Civil War

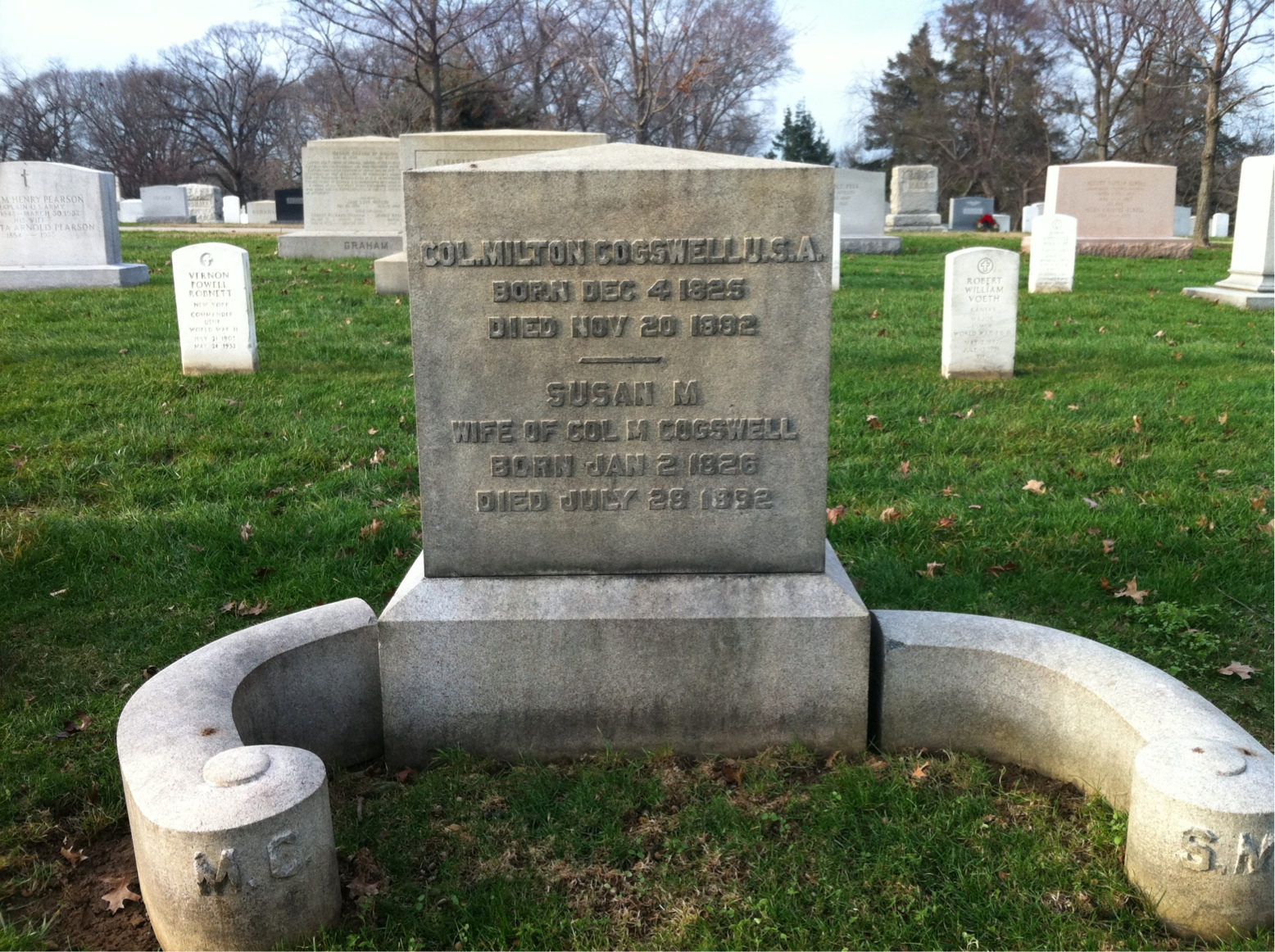
Grave of Col. Milton Cogswell and his wife Susan Maria (Lane) Cogswell in Section 3 of Arlington National Cemetery

Milton Cogswell (December 4, 1825 – November 20, 1882) was a United States Army officer.

Milton Cogswell was born in Noblesville, Indiana on December 4, 1825. He graduated from the United States Military Academy at West Point in 1849, when he was appointed brevet Second Lieutenant in the 4th United States Infantry. In 1850 he was assigned to duty on the frontier, serving with the 8th Infantry, but he was recalled and detailed as Assistant Professor of Mathematics at West Point until 1856. Cogswell then rejoined the 8th Infantry in New Mexico, participating in a skirmish with the Navajo on October 6, 1858, and remaining on station until 1860.

When the Civil War broke about, Cogswell went into active service. In July 1861, he was made Colonel of the Forty-Second New York Volunteers, and at the Battle of Ball's Bluff was captured by the Confederates and incarcerated in Libby Prison, until being exchanged. At the close of the war he was assigned to garrison duty at Baltimore, and afterward served as Acting Judge-Advocate of the Department of North Carolina.

On March 9, 1868, he was made Provisional Mayor of Charleston, South Carolina from March to July and was placed in charge of civil affairs at Summerville. He was afterward performed various duties in the South and on the Western frontier until 1871, when he retired from active service on account of a disability contracted in the line of duty.

He died on November 20, 1882, and was buried at Arlington National Cemetery, in Arlington, Virginia.

A distant relation, William S. Cogswell Jr., was elected Mayor of Charleston, taking office in January 2024.

Preceded by William Wallace Burns	Mayor of Charleston, South Carolina; 1868	Succeeded by George Washington Clark
