= John F. Ficken =

American civil servant, mayor of Charleston

John Frederick Ficken
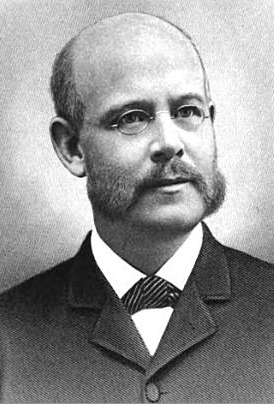

48th Mayor of Charleston
- In office 1891–1895
- Preceded by: George D. Bryan
- Succeeded by: James Adger Smyth

Personal details
- Born: June 16, 1843 Charleston, South Carolina
- Died: April 16, 1925 (aged 81) Charleston, South Carolina
- Party: Democrat
- Spouse(s): Margaret Buckingham Horlbeck, Emma Julia Blum
- Children: Henry Horlbeck Ficken
- Education: College of Charleston
- Profession: Lawyer

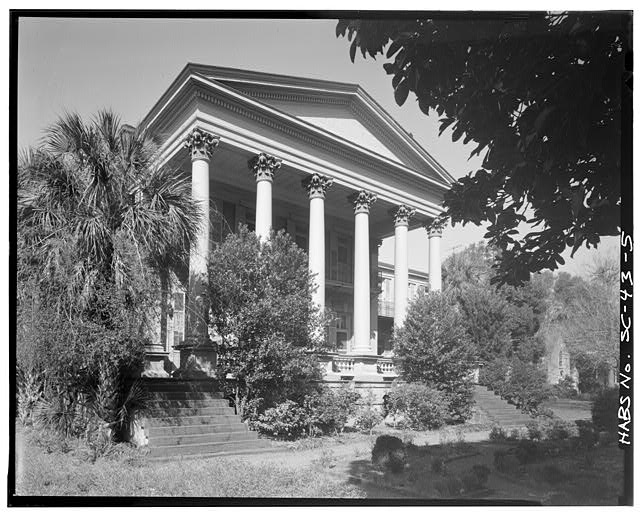
While in office, Mayor Ficken lived at 94 Rutledge Ave., Charleston, South Carolina.

John Frederick Ficken Jr. (1843–1925) was the forty-eighth mayor of Charleston, South Carolina, completing one term from 1891 to 1895. Ficken was born on June 16, 1843, in Charleston to Prussian immigrants John Frederick Ficken Sr., and Rebecca (Beversen) Ficken. He enrolled in the College of Charleston, but he joined the Confederate military at the outbreak of the Civil War. Ficken was given leave from active duty to complete his college education; he received an A.B. degree in 1864 and rejoined active duty. After the war ended, he began practicing law in Charleston and travelled to Germany for a year in 1869 to study civil law at the University of Berlin. From 1877 to December 1891, when he assumed the mayorship of Charleston, Ficken served in the South Carolina statehouse as a representative. He did not stand for re-election in 1891. During his tenure as mayor, Ficken lived at 74 Rutledge Ave. In 1902, he became president of the South Carolina Loan & Trust Co.

Among the civic offices which Ficken held were the following: president of the board of trustees for the College of Charleston, president of the Charleston Library Society, and vice president of the Medical College of South Carolina.

Ficken died on April 16, 1925, and is buried at Magnolia Cemetery in Charleston, South Carolina.

Political offices
Preceded by George D. Bryan	Mayor of Charleston, South Carolina; 1891–1895	Succeeded by James Adger Smyth
