= James Adger =

Irish-American merchant

- Born: November 2, 1777; County Antrim
- Died: September 24, 1858 (aged 80)

James Adger (November 2, 1777 – September 24, 1858) was an Irish-American merchant. He was born in County Antrim and emigrated to the United States with his family in 1793. He moved to Charleston, South Carolina, in 1802 and became "one of the wealthiest and most influential merchants of antebellum Charleston." He partnered with Samuel Bones in Bones & Adger, a cotton buying business, and with James Black in Adger & Black, a trading company. He also established a hardware firm, James Adger & Company. One of his ships, the USS James Adger, was later pressed into service in the Union Navy during the American Civil War.

Adger married Sarah Elizabeth Ellison and they had nine children, including John, who became a missionary, and Margaret, who married Thomas Smyth, minister of the Second Presbyterian Church. Adger's grandson, James Adger Smyth, later served two terms as mayor of Charleston from 1896 to 1903. Adger himself served as a member of the South Carolina House of Representatives from 1826 to 1828.

At one time he was reckoned to be the fourth wealthiest man in the United States.
