= William W. Sale =

Mayor of Charleston

45th Mayor of Charleston
- In office December 17, 1877 – 1879
- Preceded by: George I. Cunningham
- Succeeded by: William Ashmead Courtenay

Personal details
- Born: September 1819 Charleston, South Carolina
- Died: Unknown
- Party: Democrat
- Spouse: Emma Sale
- Children: Charles Sale; Edith B. Sale Knight (1873–1907); George H. Sale (1880–1957)
- Profession: bank teller

William W. Sale was the forty-fifth mayor of Charleston, South Carolina, serving one term from 1877 to 1879. He was born in September 1819 in South Carolina and married Edith Cleapor in about 1871. Before being elected, Sale worked as a teller at the First National Bank in Charleston. Sale was endorsed by the Charleston News & Courier, and he was elected on December 11, 1877 by a margin of 5,288 to 1,924 in an election against D.F. Fleming. Sale was inducted on December 17, 1877. As mayor, Sale lived on Chinquapin Street (now part of Courtenay Street). After leaving office, he was the master of the Charleston Alms House. In 1900, he was living in Summerville, South Carolina.

Political offices
Preceded by George I. Cunningham	Mayor of Charleston, South Carolina; 1877–1879	Succeeded by William Ashmead Courtenay
