= George D. Bryan =

American politician

George Dwight Bryan

47th Mayor of Charleston
- In office 1887–1891
- Preceded by: William Ashmead Courtenay
- Succeeded by: John F. Ficken

Personal details
- Born: September 26, 1845 Charleston, South Carolina, US
- Died: June 4, 1919 (aged 73)
- Spouse: Mary Middleton King (1846–1924)
- Children: McMillan King Bryan (1874–1928); Mary Middleton Bryan French (1876–1965); Francis Marion Bryan (1876–1926); Richard Floyd Bryan (1882–1942)
- Education: United States Naval Academy (did not graduate)
- Profession: Lawyer

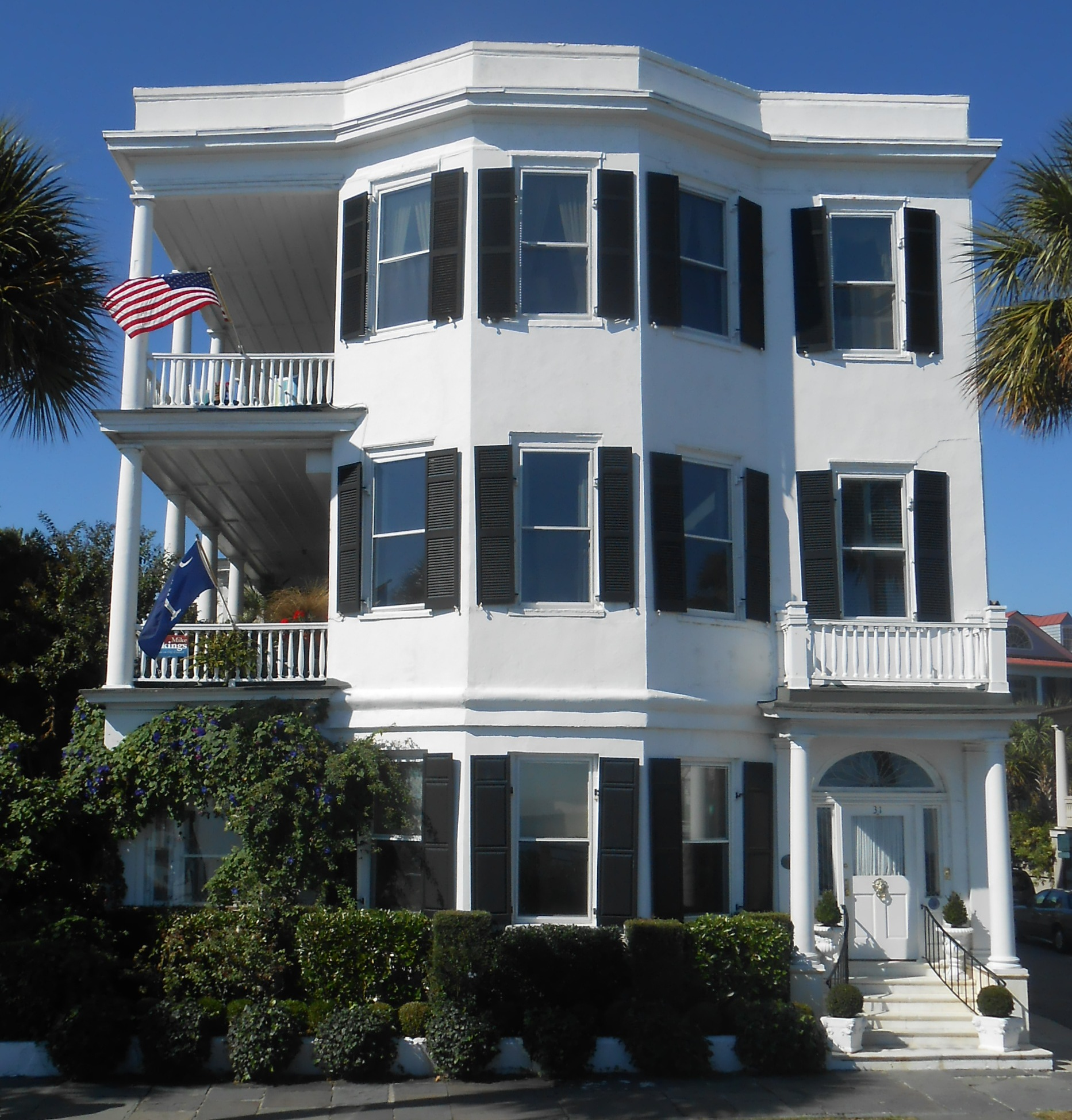
Bryan rented 31 East Battery, Charleston, South Carolina when he was elected mayor in 1887.

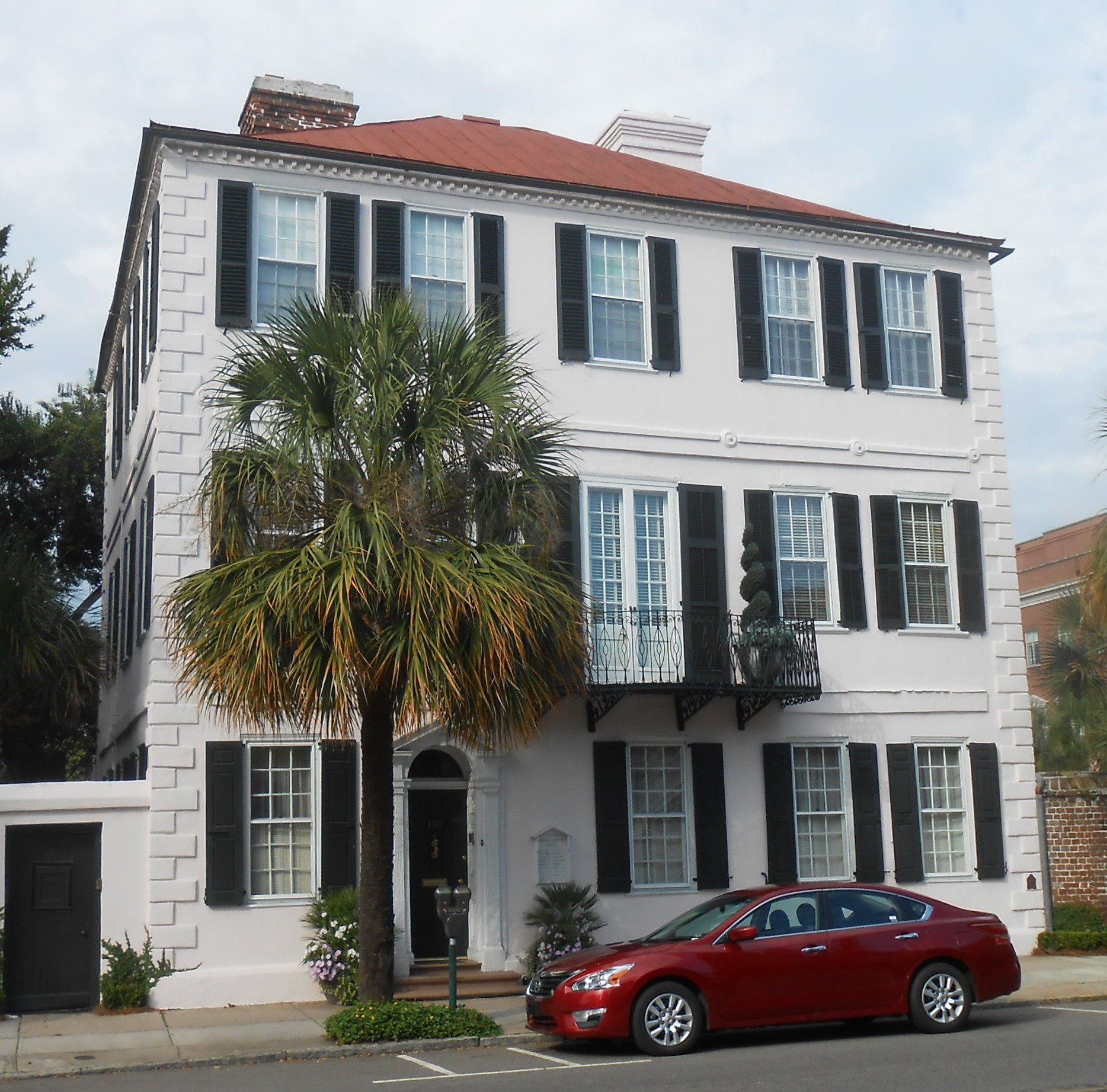
Bryan died at his house at 110 Broad Street, Charleston, South Carolina on June 4, 1919.

George D. Bryan (1845–1919) was the forty-seventh mayor of Charleston, South Carolina, completing one term from 1887 to 1891. Bryan was born on September 26, 1845, in Charleston to United States judge George S. and Rebecca Louisa Dwight. He died on June 4, 1919.

He was a student at the United States Naval Academy when the Civil War erupted, and he left the school to join the Confederate Navy. After the Civil War, he returned to Charleston and practiced law. In May 1878 he became the city's legal counsel. He was elected mayor on December 13, 1887, in an uncontested race. After his one term as mayor, in 1894, President Grover Cleveland appointed him to be collector of customs in Charleston, a job he held until July 1898. He was a probate judge from December 1901 to his death on June 4, 1919.

Political offices
| Preceded by William Ashmead Courtenay | Mayor of Charleston, South Carolina; 1887–1891 | Succeeded by John F. Ficken |
