= Robert Adger Law =

American Shakespeare scholar and professor

- Born: 1879
- Died: 1961
- Occupation: Shakespeare scholar

Robert Adger Law (1879–1961) was an American Shakespeare scholar and full professor at University of Texas, and also formerly the editor of Texas Review (now Southwest Review) at Southern Methodist University from 1915 to 1924. The Robert Adger Law and Thos H. Law Professorship at University of Texas was named in his honor and the current holder is Dr. Tanya Clement, Professor of English and Director of the Humanities Institute at the University of Texas at Austin.

Law graduated in 1898 with a B.A. from Wofford College, in 1902 with an M.A. from Trinity College (later Duke University), and in 1905 with a Ph.D. from Harvard.
