= John Bailey Adger =

Presbyterian missionary and seminary professor (1810–1899)

John Bailey Adger (December 13, 1810 – January 3, 1899) was an American missionary from Charleston, South Carolina. His father, James Adger, was very wealthy and influential in the city, and his nephew, James Adger Smyth, would later be mayor of Charleston. John went to New York for college, he graduated in 1828 from Union College before attending Princeton Theological Seminary. Graduating in 1833, the next year he was ordained by the Presbytery of Charleston Union and was sent to evangelize Armenians in modern-day Turkey. While there he translated the bible and religious texts into local languages and managed a printing press. After 12 years his eyesight began to fade, causing him to resign and return to the United States. On his journey back home, he would meet with family in London, and gain exposure to the slavery debate and gain an appreciation for the abolitionist position (though he remained a general supporter of slavery in the United States).

In Charleston, he lobbied for and was the original preacher at a Presbyterian church for free and non-free blacks of the city, Zion Presbyterian Church, in 1849. This church would attempt to de-segregate after the civil war in the United States, and had achieved partial integration before intervention after the war. In 1857 he became the Professor of Ecclesiastical History and Church Polity at Columbia Theological Seminary until 1874. While a Unionist before the war, he supported the Confederacy during the war. Afterwards, he would be an influential leader in the creation of the Southern Presbyterian Church.
