= John Tecklenburg =

American businessman and politician

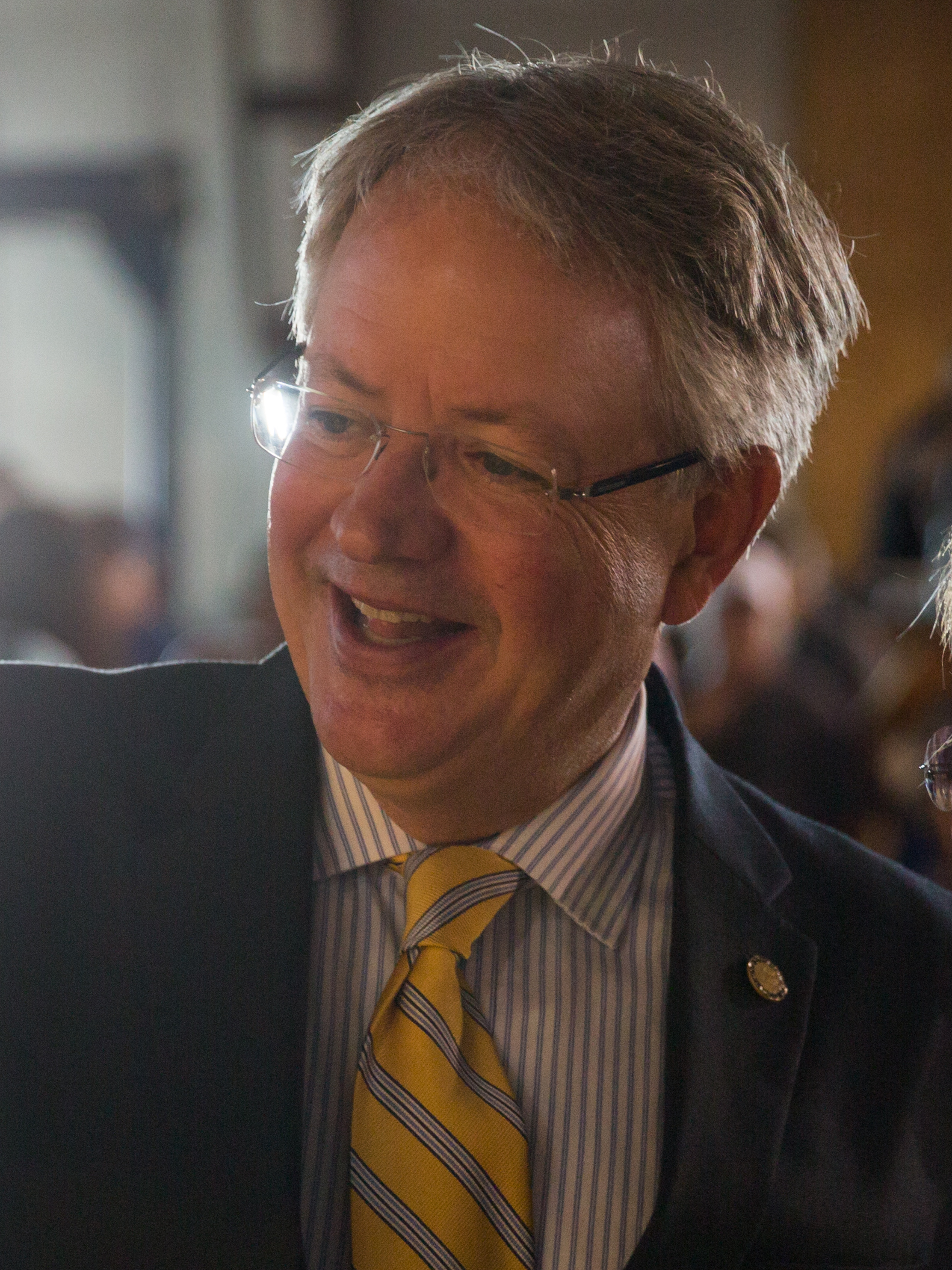
- Tecklenburg in 2017

61st Mayor of Charleston
- In office January 11, 2016 – January 8, 2024
- Preceded by: Joseph P. Riley Jr.
- Succeeded by: William S. Cogswell Jr.

Personal details
- Born: September 1955 (age 70–71) Charleston, South Carolina, U.S.
- Party: Democratic
- Spouse: Sandy Tecklenburg
- Children: 5
- Education: Georgetown University (Bachelor of Science); Berklee College of Music

John J. Tecklenburg (born September 1955) is an American businessman and politician. He served two terms as mayor of Charleston, South Carolina, sworn into office on January 11, 2016. Tecklenburg was defeated in 2023 by former state legislator William S. Cogswell Jr. He became the first mayor of Charleston to lose a reelection campaign since 1959.

== Early life and education ==
Tecklenburg is a native of Orangeburg, South Carolina. He graduated from Georgetown University in Washington, D.C., with a degree in chemistry. He later studied jazz at Berklee College of Music in Boston.

== Career ==
Tecklenburg was Charleston's director of economic development from 1995 to 1999. He is a commercial realtor.

Tecklenburg ran for mayor of Charleston and won against Leon Stavrinakis on November 17, 2015. Tecklenburg was preceded by Joe Riley who was mayor of Charleston for 40 years.

In June 2020, in the wake of widespread protests against racism, Mayor Tecklenburg announced a decision to remove a statue of John C. Calhoun, a prominent South Carolinian defender of slavery, from a prominent public space in Charleston, in Marion Square.

== Personal life ==
Tecklenburg and his wife Sandy have five children and five grandchildren.

In May 2018, Tecklenburg was removed from being a conservator for an elderly woman. Tecklenburg had used his ward's funds to make unsecured loans to himself and his wife totaling $80,000. He had not sought the court's approval as required by law.

Political offices
Preceded by Joseph P. Riley Jr.	Mayor of Charleston, South Carolina; 2016–2023	Succeeded by William S. Cogswell Jr.
