= William S. Cogswell Jr. =

Mayor, City of Charleston

William Cogswell

Mayor of Charleston
- Incumbent
- Assumed office January 8, 2024
- Preceded by: John Tecklenburg

Member of the South Carolina House of Representatives from the 110th district
- In office November 14, 2016 – November 14, 2022
- Preceded by: Chip Limehouse
- Succeeded by: Tom Hartnett Jr.

Personal details
- Born: William Scott Cogswell; January 14, 1975 (age 51) Charleston, South Carolina, U.S.
- Party: Republican
- Spouse: Lucile Lampton
- Children: 2
- Education: University of the South (BA); Columbia University (MS)

William Scott Cogswell Jr. (born January 14, 1975) is an American politician and businessman who is the mayor of Charleston, South Carolina. A member of the Republican Party, he served from 2016 to 2022 in the South Carolina House of Representatives from the 110th District. Cogswell was elected mayor in 2023, defeating incumbent John Tecklenburg, and is Charleston's first Republican mayor since 1877.

== Early life, family and education ==
William Cogswell was born on January 14, 1975, in Charleston, South Carolina. He is a distant relative of Colonel Milton Cogswell, who was named a provisional mayor of Charleston in 1868.

Cogswell graduated from The University of the South at Sewanee, Tennessee, in 1997 with a Bachelor of Arts in history and English. He earned a Master of Science in Real Estate Development from Columbia Graduate School of Architecture, Planning and Preservation in 2003.

== Political career ==
2023 Charleston, SC Mayoral Runoff Election results map by precinct Cogswell: 50–60%; 60–70%; 70–80%; Tecklenburg: 50–60%; 60–70%; 70–80%; 80–90%; >90%; Tie No votes

A member of the Republican Party, Cogswell served in the South Carolina House of Representatives from the 110th District from 2016 to 2022.

Cogswell was elected mayor on November 21, 2023, defeating incumbent John Tecklenburg in a runoff. He is Charleston's first Republican mayor since 1877.

Endorsements for Cogswell included South Carolina Senator Tim Scott, state representative Mark Smith, and state senator Larry Grooms. South Carolina Republican Party chair Drew McKissick said in a press statement that Cogswell's victory represented "shifting momentum", referencing Republican mayors elected in South Carolina's largest cities: Greenville, Columbia, and Charleston.

Cogswell endorsed Nikki Haley in the 2024 Republican presidential primaries.

On December 15, 2023, Cogswell announced his appointment of senior staff:

- Elizabeth Applegate Dieck, chief of staff
- Logan McVey, chief policy officer
- Deja Knight McMillan, director of communications
- Wendell Gilliard, special advisor, quality of life and community outreach
- Mika Gadsden, special advisor, community and environmental initiatives.

== Electoral history ==
South Carolina House of Representatives District 110
| Year | Candidate | Votes | Pct | Candidate | Votes | Pct | Candidate | Votes | Pct | Candidate | Votes | Pct |
|---|---|---|---|---|---|---|---|---|---|---|---|---|
| 2016 Republican Primary | William S. Cogswell Jr. | 1,051 | 34.4% | Russell Guerard | 792 | 25.9% | Trey Harrell | 626 | 20.5% | Eddie Phipps | 537 | 17.6% |
| 2016 Republican Primary Runoff | William S. Cogswell Jr. | 1,063 | 52.8% | Russell Guerard | 951 | 47.2% | | | | | | |
| 2016 General Election | William S. Cogswell Jr. | 11,961 | 65.1% | Alice Wakefield | 6,416 | 34.9% | | | | | | |
| 2018 Republican Primary | William S. Cogswell Jr. (i) | 1,722 | 46.3% | Russell Guerard | 1,589 | 42.7% | Will Freeman | 411 | 11.0% | | | |
| 2018 Republican Primary Runoff | William S. Cogswell Jr. (i) | 2,214 | 58.7% | Russell Guerard | 1,556 | 41.3% | | | | | | |
| 2018 General Election | William S. Cogswell Jr. (i) | 9,264 | 55.1% | Ben Pogue | 7,548 | 44.9% | Others/Write-in | 9 | 0.0% | | | |

Political offices
| Preceded by John Tecklenburg | Mayor of Charleston, South Carolina; 2024–present | Incumbent |
