= Thomas Smyth (minister) =

American Presbyterian Minister

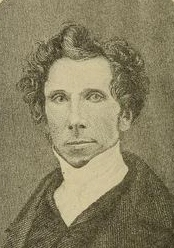
- Portrait of Smyth, 1850

Personal details
- Born: June 14, 1808 Belfast, United Kingdom
- Died: August 20, 1873 (aged 65) Charleston, South Carolina, United States

Thomas Smyth (June 14, 1808 – August 20, 1873) was an American Presbyterian minister. He served as minister of Second Presbyterian Church in Charleston, South Carolina for more than 40 years, from 1832 until his death.

Smyth was born in Belfast and studied at Belfast College, graduating in 1829. He then emigrated with his family to the United States in 1830, and completed his studies at Princeton Theological Seminary, graduating in 1831. He later received a Doctor of Divinity degree from Princeton also.

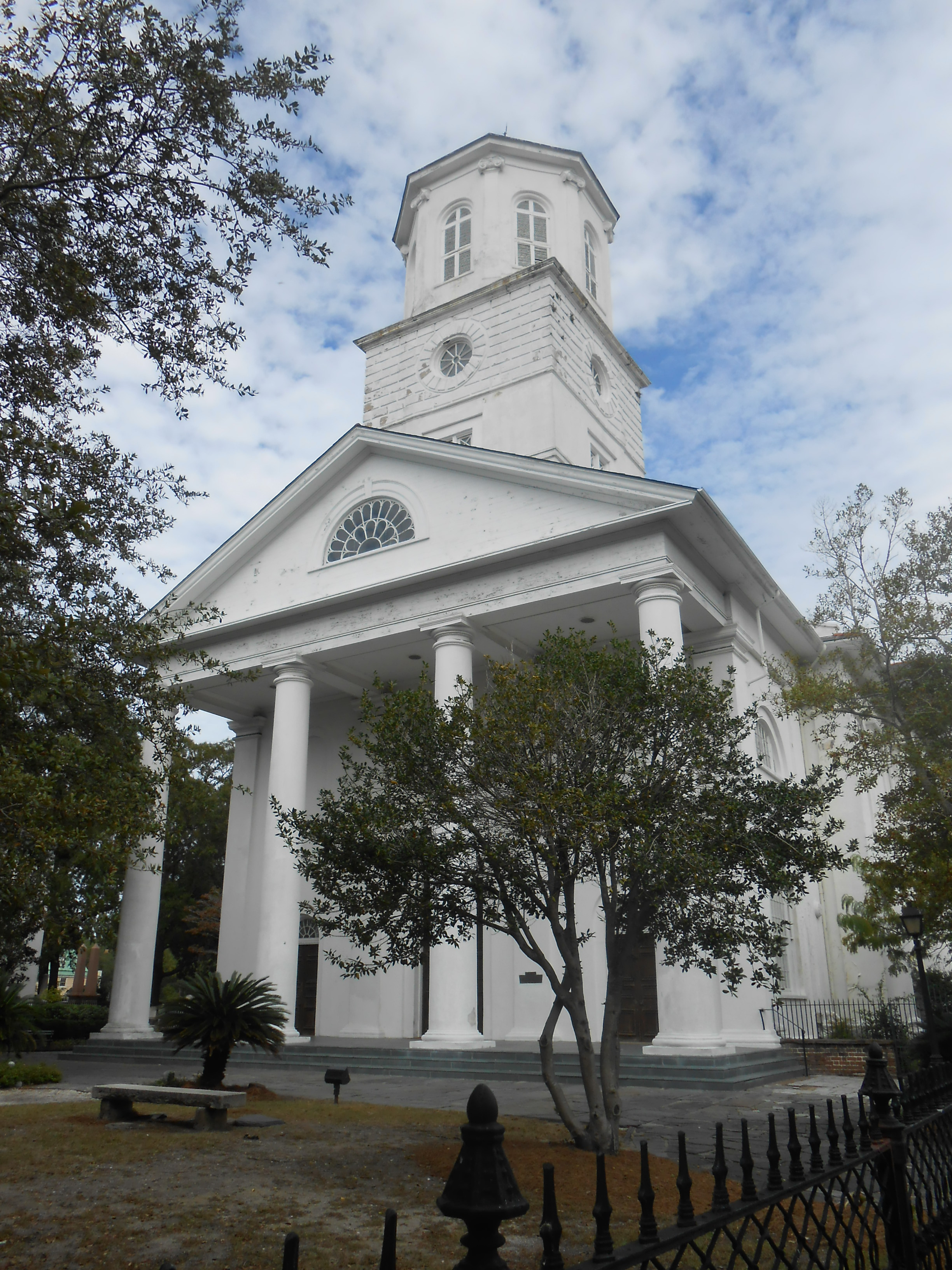
Second Presbyterian Church, where Smyth served for more than 40 years

Smyth commenced pulpit supply at Second Presbyterian Church in Charleston in 1832, and was ordained in 1834. He married Margaret Milligan Adger, daughter of James Adger, a wealthy local merchant, on July 9, 1832. At times the family wealth would be a point of conflict between Smyth and some members of his congregation, who voiced their opposition to Smyth receiving a raise in salary. Some members of the congregation also thought he preached too long. Barry Waugh argues that Smyth nevertheless had a fruitful ministry, as evidenced by the fact that at least thirty-six men from his congregation entered the ministry.

Thomas and Margaret Smyth had nine children. Their son, James Adger Smyth, served as Mayor of Charleston from 1896 to 1903, while another son, Joseph Ellison Adger Smyth, became a prominent industrialist.

Smyth was an Old School Presbyterian. He wrote numerous books, and after his death his complete works were published in ten volumes. Smyth was especially interested in presbyterian polity. Along with Charles Hodge, he argued that elders and ministers held separate offices in the church, as opposed to the view of Robert Lewis Dabney and James Henley Thornwell that elder and minister constituted the same office. Along these lines, Smyth argued that a ruling elder was not a presbuteros in his 1845 work The Name, Nature, and Functions, of Ruling Elders: Wherein it is Shown from the Testimony of Scripture, the Fathers, and the Reformers, that Ruling Elders are not Presbyters or Bishops, and that as Representatives of the People, their Office Ought to be Temporary.

In 1850, Smyth wrote The Unity of the Human Races Proved to be the Doctrine of Scripture, Reason, and Science. With a Review of the Present Position and Theory of Professor Agassiz. In it, he rejected Louis Agassiz' theory of polygenism and defended monogenism, the theory that all humans had a common descent. Smyth thus argued for the full humanity of Africans. Colin Kidd suggests that he was the "most influential defender of monogenesis in the nineteenth-century United States".

Smyth tried to take a moderate approach to slavery. He sought to reform the institution of slavery by arguing for the humane treatment of slaves. Barry Waugh notes that "in Charleston, he was thought an Abolitionist, while in Britain, he was seen as a supporter of slavery." Smyth was instrumental in the establishment of Zion Presbyterian Church for black people, and for this he was vilified by some Southerners. When the Civil War started, however, he became an ardent Confederate.

Smyth was a bibliophile and specialized in the history of Calvinism. He had a library of 20,000 volumes, the majority of which he eventually sold to Columbia Theological Seminary.
