= Gilbert Pillsbury =

American politician

42nd Mayor of Charleston
- In office May 1869 – 1871
- Preceded by: George Washington Clark
- Succeeded by: Johann Andreas Wagener

Personal details
- Born: February 23, 1813 Henniker, New Hampshire
- Died: January 4, 1893 (aged 79) Boston, Massachusetts
- Party: Republican
- Spouse: Ann Frances Ray
- Education: Dartmouth (1841)
- Profession: teacher

Gilbert Pillsbury (1813-1893) was the Reconstruction mayor of Charleston, South Carolina, and he served one term from 1868 to 1871. He ran against William Patton and Chancellor Lesesne. Due to election challenges, he was installed as mayor only in May 1869. He was again nominated for a second term in 1871, but lost to Johann Andreas Wagener.

Pillsbury attended Phillips Academy but did not graduate. He argued that the school's "vigorous pro-slavery restrictions" forced him to leave after he helped found an Abolitionist Society on campus. He joined over fifty students in advocating for abolition following lectures in 1834 by George Thompson (abolitionist) and William Lloyd Garrison on campus. He graduated from Dartmouth College in 1841 and served in the Massachusetts State Senate in 1854.

Pillsbury was an abolitionist who, during the Civil War, headed to the South as an agent of the Freedman's Bureau. He was originally stationed in Hilton Head Island, South Carolina before moving to Charleston, South Carolina with his wife in October 1865. In Charleston, he worked to educate freed slaves and was placed in charge of abandoned property. In 1870, Pillsbury lived at 9 George St. (today a parking lot across from the Spoleto Festival USA Headquarters), and from 1872 to his death on January 4, 1893, he lived in Massachusetts.

Preceded by George Washington Clark	Mayor of Charleston, South Carolina; 1869–1871	Succeeded by Johann Andreas Wagener
