= James Adger Smyth =

Former mayor of Charleston, South Carolina

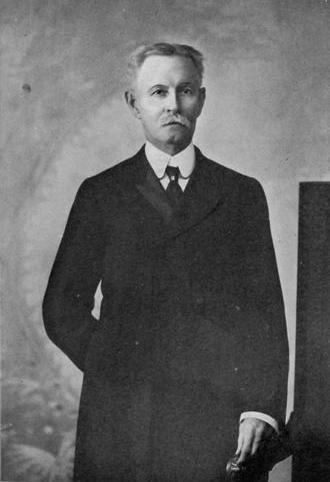

49th Mayor of Charleston
- In office 1895–1903
- Preceded by: John F. Ficken
- Succeeded by: R. Goodwyn Rhett

Personal details
- Born: June 8, 1837 Charleston, South Carolina
- Died: April 25, 1920 (aged 82) Charleston, South Carolina
- Profession: cotton broker

James Adger Smyth (June 8, 1837 – April 25, 1920) was Mayor of Charleston, South Carolina for two terms between 1896 and 1903.

Smyth was born on June 8, 1837, in Charleston, South Carolina. His father, Thomas Smyth, was pastor of the Second Presbyterian Church in Charleston; his mother, Margaret Milligan Adger Smyth, was the daughter of a Charleston shipping merchant, James Adger, making the missionary John Bailey Adger his uncle. He attended Doctor Miller's Preparatory School, the Charleston High School, and Professor Sachtleben's School. He graduated from the College of Charleston in 1858 and began working at his uncles' wholesale hardware firm, J.E. Adger & Company. He married Annie Ransom Briggs, the daughter of Cedar Grove Plantation owner, Thomas Whitaker Briggs in March 1860. In 1862, he enlisted and fought with Company A of the 25th Regiment of the South Carolina Volunteers until the end of the Civil War in 1865.

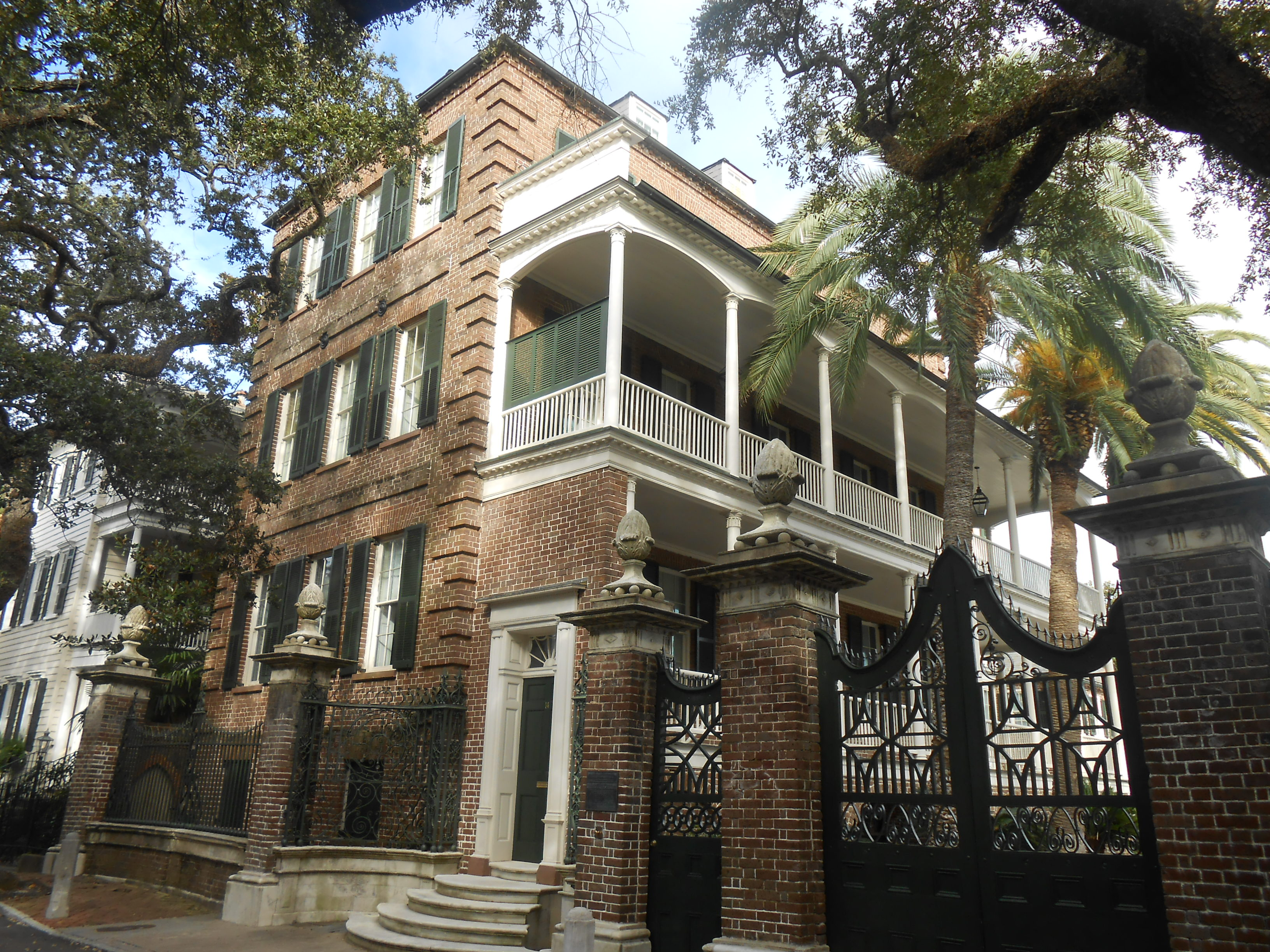
Mayor Smyth occupied the historic Simmons-Edwards House at 14 Legare St. from 1879 to his death.

After the war he resumed work with his maternal uncles, Robert Adger and Joseph Ellison Adger, at J.E. Adger & Company. During his ten years in the company he became an active member in the Chamber of Commerce. In 1875, Smyth became an independent cotton broker, and along with his cousin, Andrew Moffett Adger, started the company Smyth and Adger, successfully brokering cotton from North Carolina, Georgia, and Alabama.

Smyth grew increasingly involved in local politics. He was member of the State and County Democratic Executive Committees (1876), City Council (1885), and mayor for two four-year terms (1895 to 1903). He retired in 1904.

He lived at 14 Legare St., Charleston, South Carolina from 1879 until he died on April 25, 1920. His son, E. A. Smyth, was professor of zoology and football coach at Virginia Tech.

Political offices
Preceded by John F. Ficken	Mayor of Charleston, South Carolina; 1895–1903	Succeeded by R. Goodwyn Rhett
