= Pelzer Manufacturing Company and Mill Village Historic District =

Historic district in South Carolina, United States

- U.S. National Register of Historic Places
- U.S. Historic district
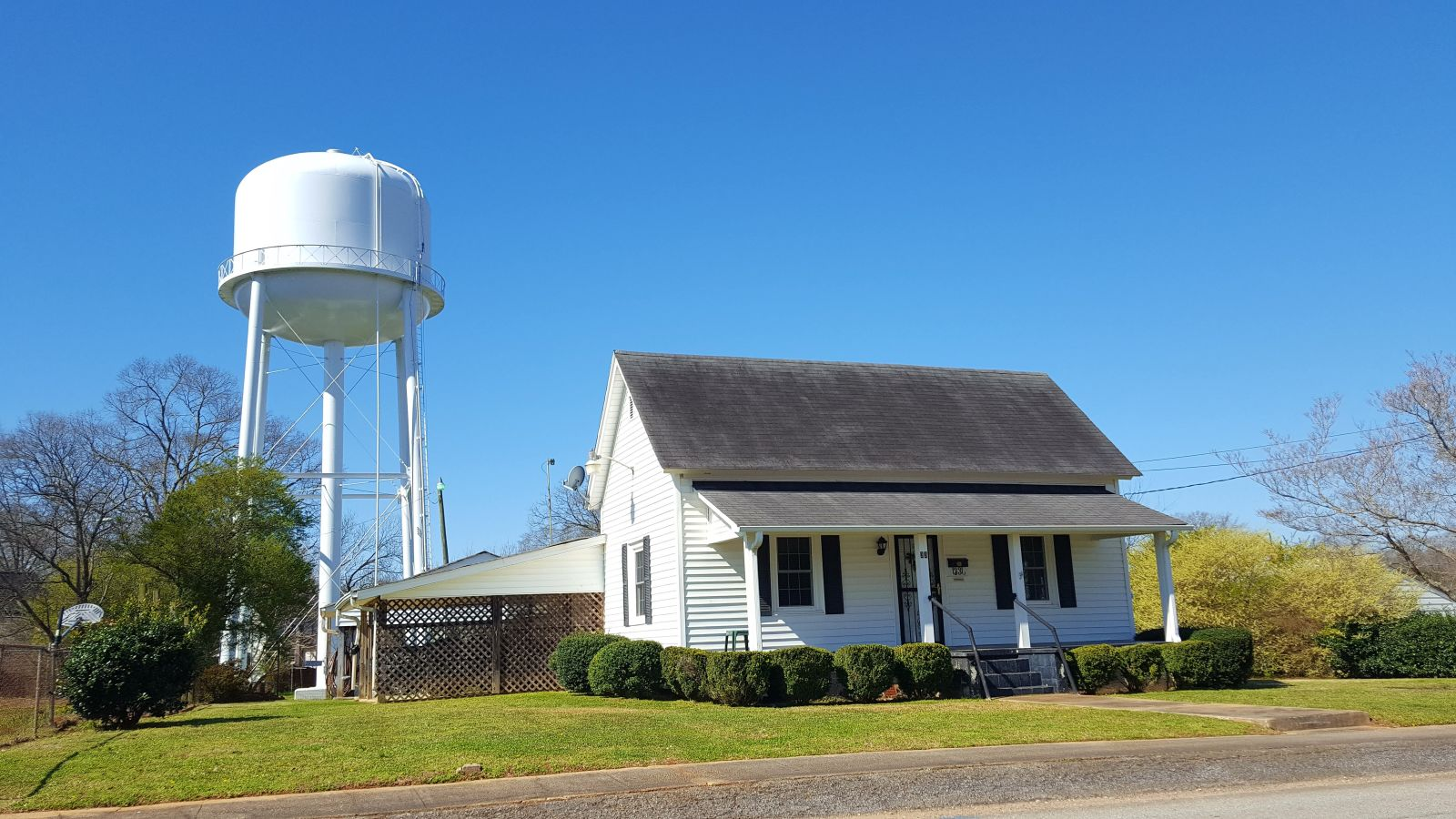
- Mill house and water tower

- Location within South Carolina Location within the United States
- Location: Portions of Lebby, Reed, Courtney, Smythe, & Anderson Sts., Pelzer, South Carolina
- Coordinates: 34°38′30″N 82°27′25″W
- Built: 1913
- NRHP reference No.: 100001718
- Added to NRHP: October 10, 2017

The Pelzer Manufacturing Company and Mill Village Historic District is a historic manufacturing complex and associated mill village in Pelzer, South Carolina. The district includes five mill buildings constructed beginning in 1881 by the Pelzer Manufacturing Company, and a mill village with worker housing and other civic and institutional buildings. The mill housing was sold off to individuals in 1954.

The district was listed on the National Register of Historic Places in 2017.

== See also ==
- National Register of Historic Places listings in Anderson County, South Carolina
