= William Enston Home =

Historic house in South Carolina, United States

- Enston, William, Home
- U.S. National Register of Historic Places
- U.S. Historic district
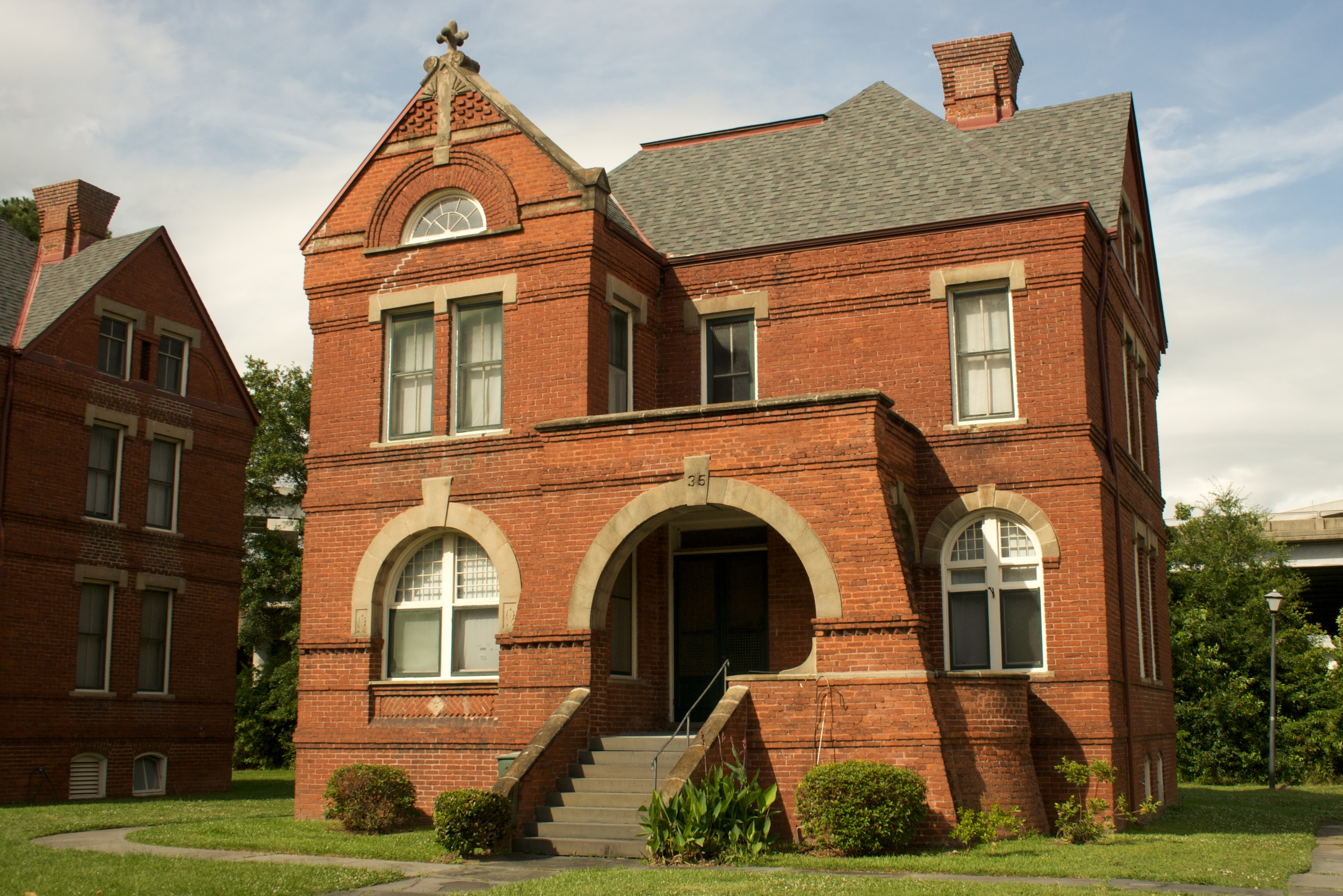
- One of the original twenty-four William Enston Home cottages

- Location within South Carolina Location within the United States
- Location: 900 King St., Charleston, South Carolina
- Coordinates: 32°48′5″N 79°56′56″W
- Area: 12.1 acres (4.9 ha)
- Built: 1884
- Architect: W.B.W. Howe Jr.; Rudolph Hering et al.
- Architectural style: Bungalow/Craftsman, Queen Anne, Romanesque
- NRHP reference No.: 96000493
- Added to NRHP: April 25, 1996

The William Enston Home, located at 900 King St., Charleston, South Carolina, is a complex of many buildings all constructed in Romanesque Revival architecture, a rare style in Charleston. Twenty-four cottages were constructed beginning in 1887 along with a memorial chapel at the center with a campanile style tower, and it was reserved for white residents. An infirmary was added in 1931 and later converted into a superintendent's home.

In 2006, construction was undertaken on a series of additional cottages which were meant to complete the plan for the community. These cottages, located at the southern edge of the property, are reminiscent of the original design but lack the architectural detail of the originals. Today the complex is owned by the Housing Authority of Charleston and the restored cottages are home to persons of low to moderate income.

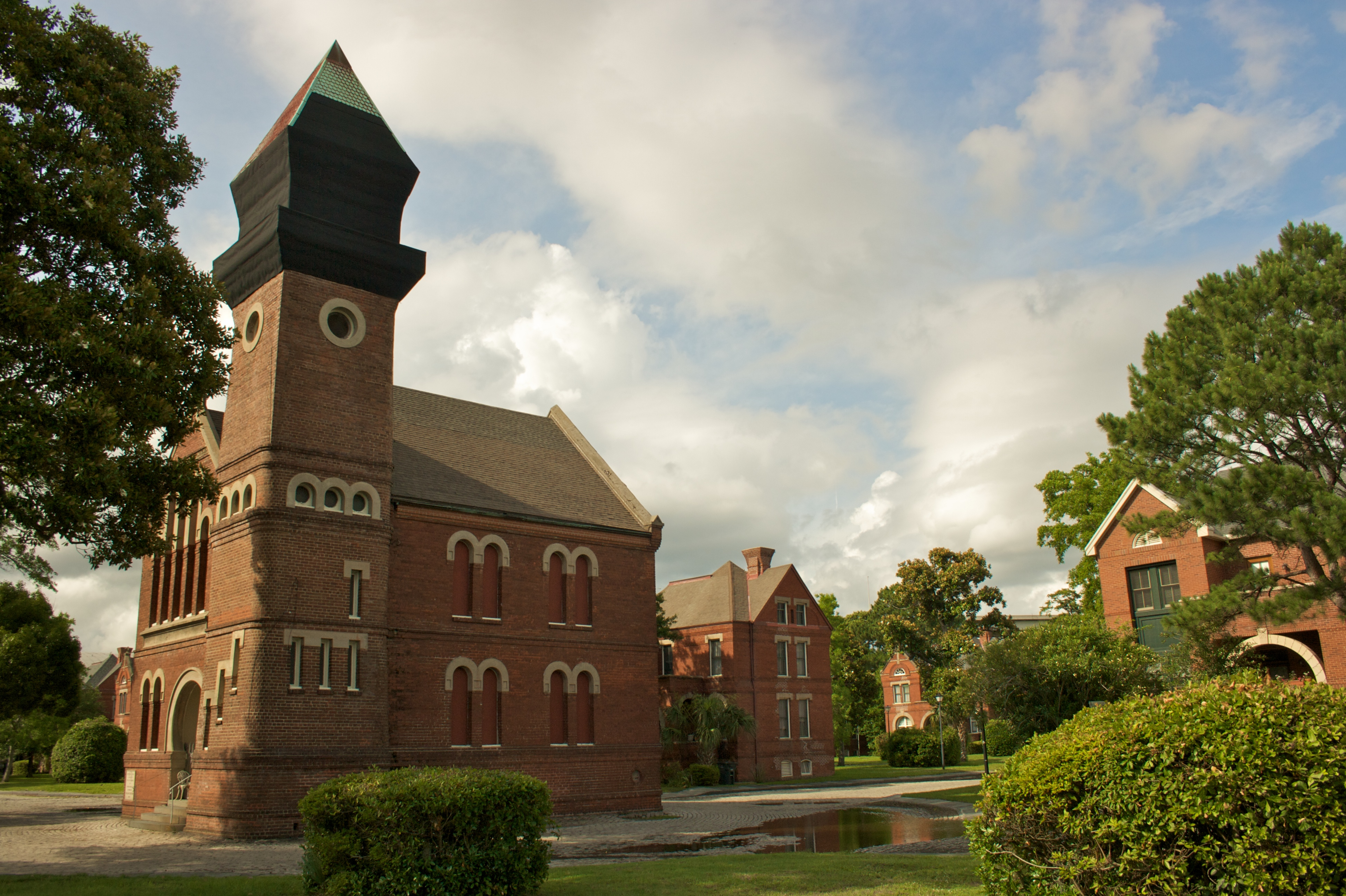
The William Enston Home chapel with a new cottage built in 2006 behind foliage on the right.

== History ==
William Enston was a prosperous furniture maker, merchant, and steamship magnate who left his fortune for the creation of a home for the white elderly. He was born on May 5, 1808, in Canterbury, England, and immigrated to Philadelphia, Pennsylvania with his father in 1825. In 1832, he moved to Charleston, South Carolina and later married Hannah Shuttleworth of Colsterworth, England. He began a small store on King Street. (later building the large structure still standing at 187-191 King St.) He eventually amassed a fortune through real estate and commercial shipping. He died on March 23, 1860, leaving a fortune valued at $1 million, but the Civil War reduced its value to half that amount.

Site work began in 1884, but construction of the housing units did not begin for a few more years. The City of Charleston received the proceeds of the estate in 1886 following the death of Enston's widow. In 1887, twenty-seven years after the death of Enston, W.B.W. Howe Jr. designed the complex of two-story brick cottages according to Enston's instructions. The Home was to be modeled on similar British institutions, specifically one Enston was familiar with in his native Canterbury. Enston specified that the complex be composed of neat and convenient two-story brick cottages with at least eight acres of land. He also stipulated that potential residents be the old and sick, from 45 to 75 years old, of "good honest character," and not suffering from "lunacy." Original streets in the development reflect people and places from Enston's life including Shutterworth (his wife's maiden name), Canterbury (his hometown), and Colsterworth (his wife's hometown).

The original nineteen cottages were completed in 1888 as duplexes. City Council voted to erect on memorial hall to Mr. Enston in the center of the village, costing up to $7500. City Council hired Colin McK. Grant as the contractor for the memorial hall. The Enston Memorial Hall in the center of the community was opened on February 22, 1889. A bust of Enston, sculpted by Virginian sculptor Valentine, and then cast in bronze in New York was order by City Council for the Memorial Hall. In 2013, it was estimated that it would cost almost $1.7 million to restore the Memorial Hall which at the time was being used to store equipment. That year, the Preservation Society of Charleston listed the hall as one of the seven most endangered sites of significance in the city.

Five new units were added at a cost of $9500 each in 1927. The new units were designed as quadraplexes and were built by Cheeves-Oliver Construction Co. They became Units 6, 7, 8, 9, and 10.

In 1991, the Charleston Housing Authority contracted to buy the property from the Enston Foundation for $625,000. The deal was cancelled in December 1991, however, when the Housing Authority realized the extent of repair work needed (estimated at $1.7 million). After more negotiations, the Housing Authority signed a contract to acquire the 12-acre site with 24 houses for $400,000. A distant relative of William Enston objected to the sale on the basis that the homes had to be used for the elderly, not low-income, residents; eventually the dispute was settled, and the sale proceeded. The authority had 13 new units built in 2006, designed in a contemporary style by Judy Stephens. In 2020, a local nonprofit Green Heart, broke ground on a half-acre urban farm which is located in the middle of the complex.

== Gallery ==
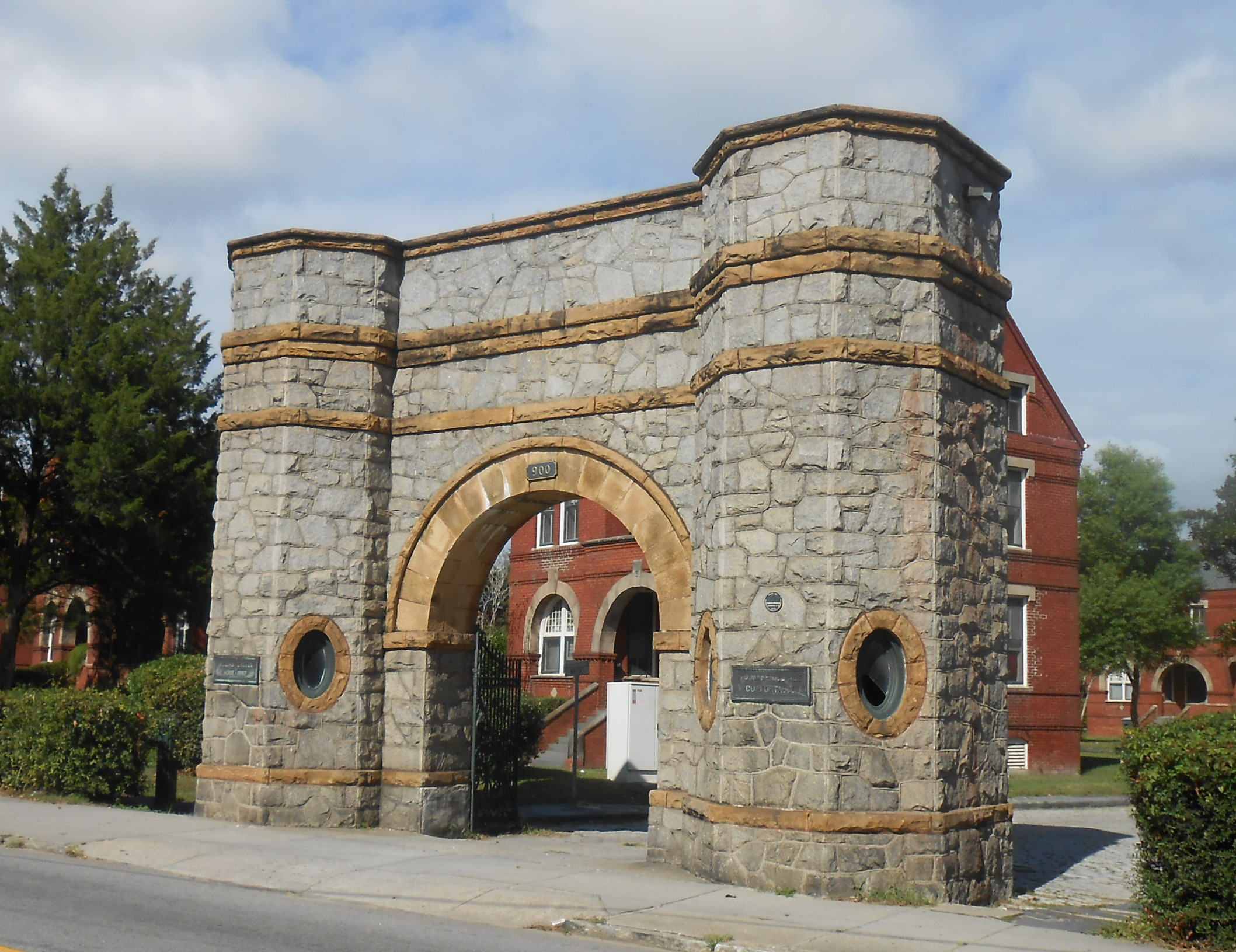
The gate at the William Enston Home in Charleston, South Carolina features wrought iron gates.

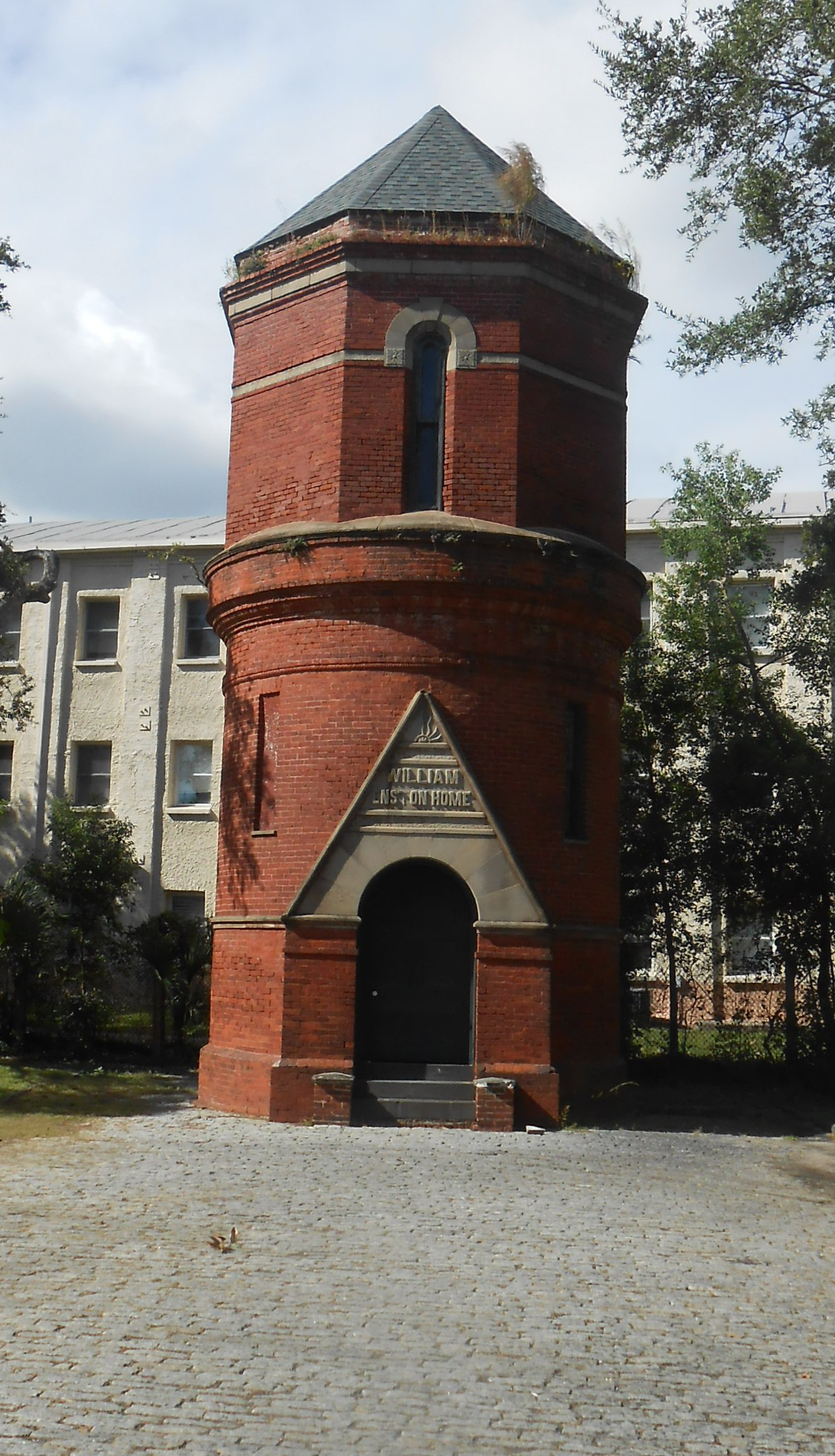
Even the water tower of the William Enston Home in Charleston, South Carolina displays Victorian brickwork.

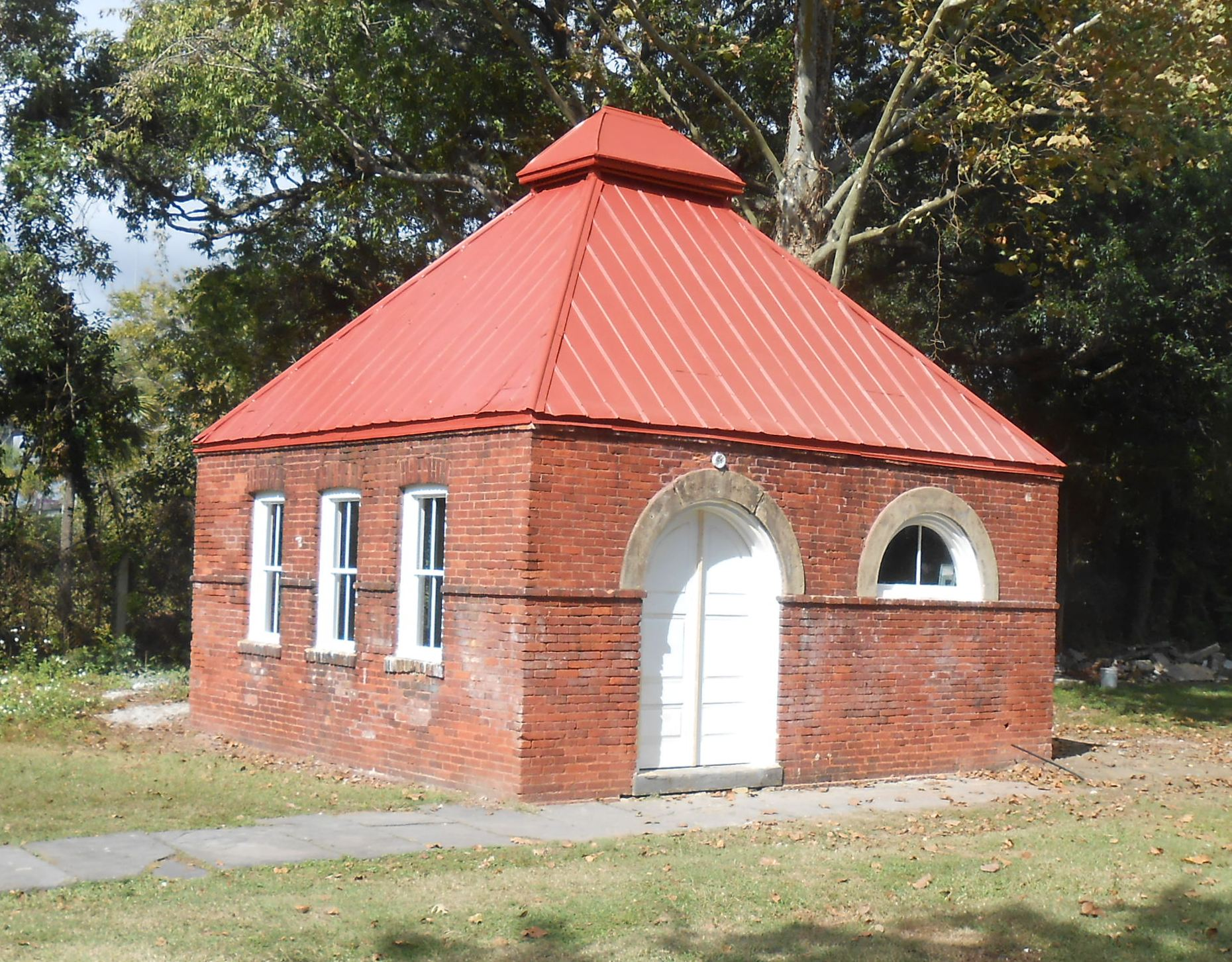
The small utility building at the William Enston Home in Charleston, South Carolina is built of dark red brick.

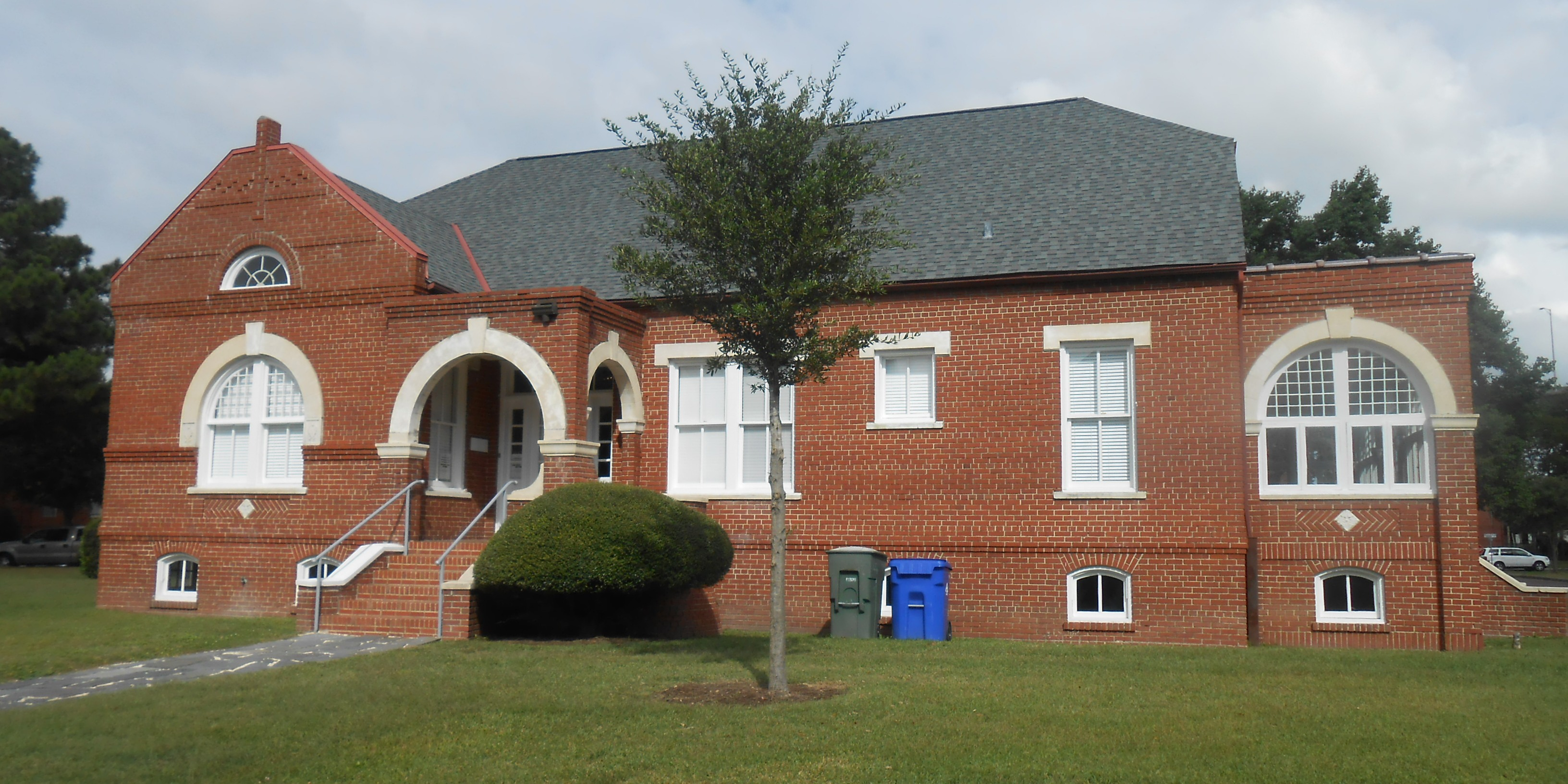
The gymnasium of the William Enston Home in Charleston, South Carolina was later converted into a residence for the superintendent.

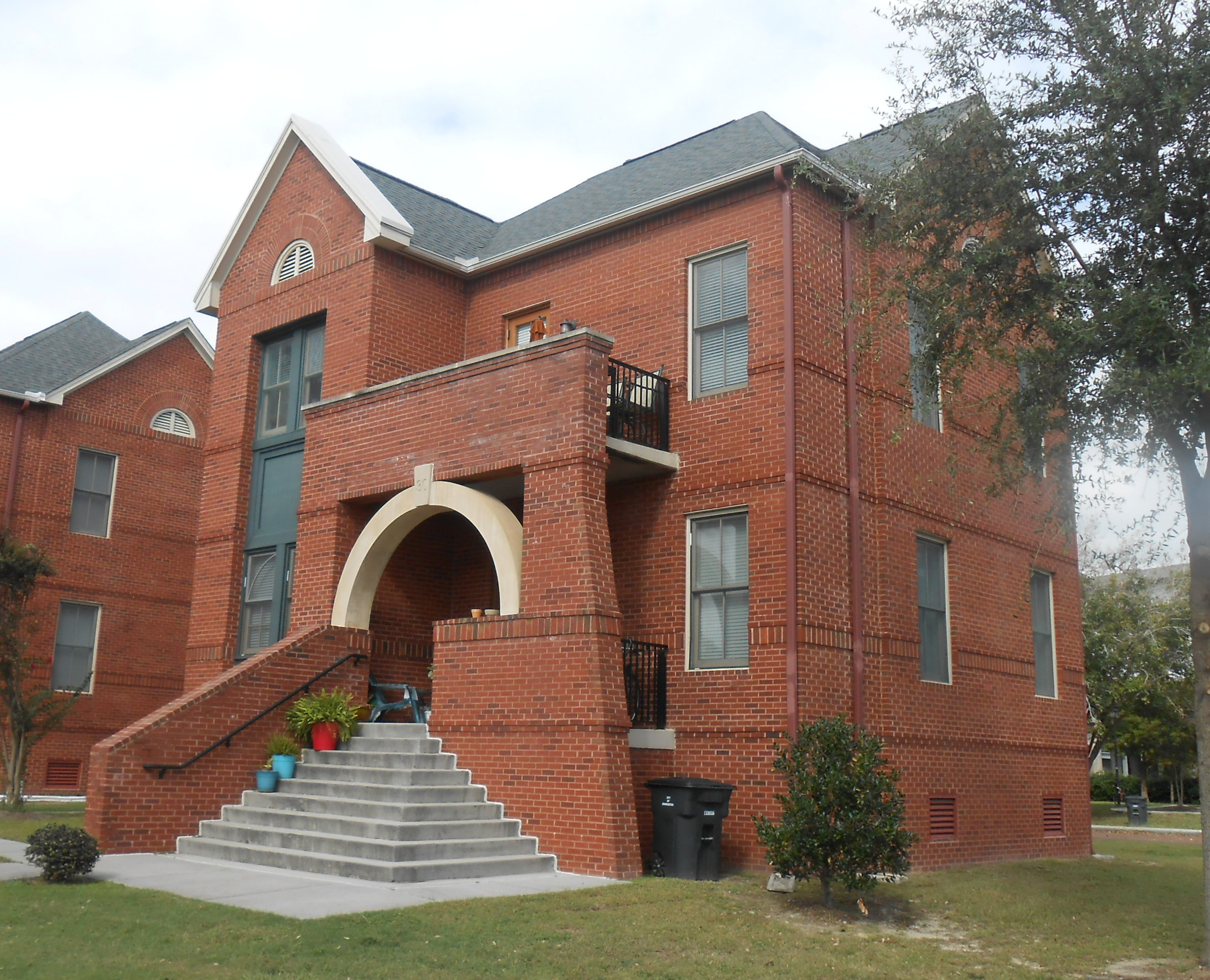
The new units at the William Enston Home in Charleston, South Carolina were vaguely meant to replicate the historic units.

== Sources ==
- Robert P. Stockton, Information for Guides of Historic Charleston, South Carolina 312-13 (1985).
