= Second Presbyterian Church (Charleston, South Carolina) =

Church in Charleston, South Carolina

Coordinates: 32.78883°N 79.93394°W

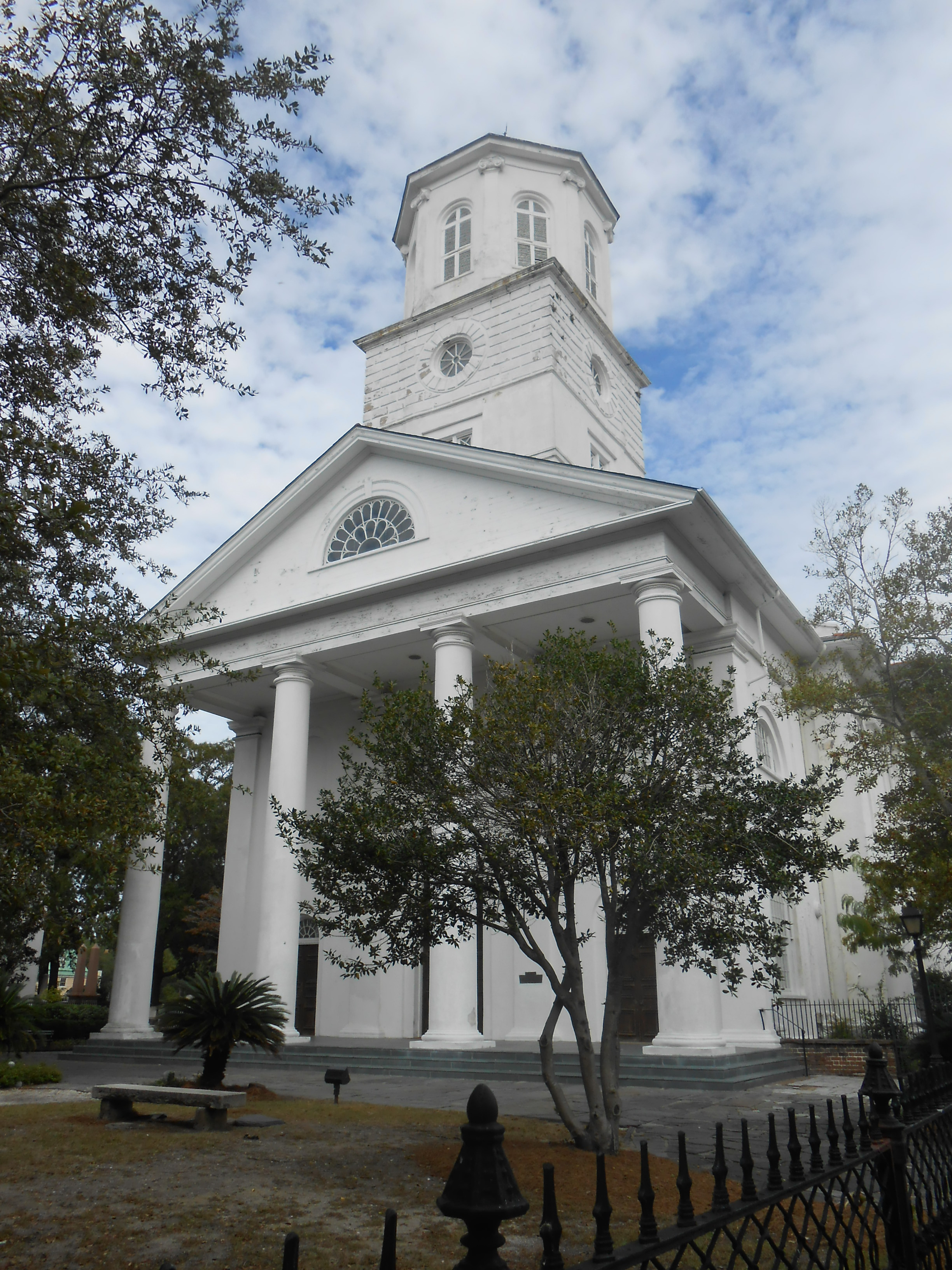
Second Presbyterian is the fourth oldest church in Charleston, South Carolina.

The Second Presbyterian Church is the fourth oldest church in Charleston, South Carolina.

== History ==
Andrew Flinn, a minister, organized the congregation to accommodate the growing congregation at First (Scots) Presbyterian Church on lower Meeting Street. The new church was built at 342 Meeting St., Charleston, South Carolina at the then substantial cost of $100,000, and on April 3, 1811, it was dedicated as "The Second Presbyterian Church of Charleston and Its Suburbs." The land had been obtained from the Wragg family. An act of the state legislature authorized the holding of a public lottery to raise funds for the building.

Thomas Smyth was minister for more than forty years in the nineteenth century, from 1832 until his death in 1873.

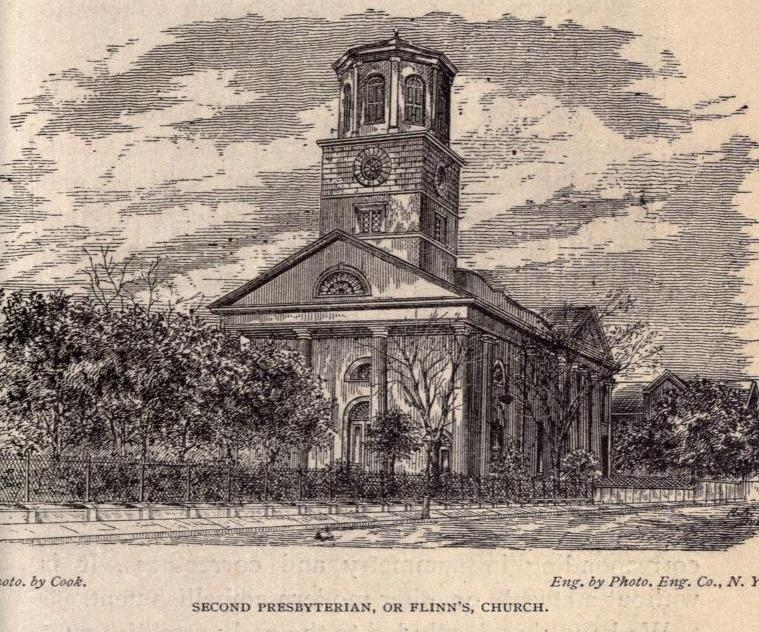
Second Presbyterian was included in an 1875 illustrated guide to Charleston.

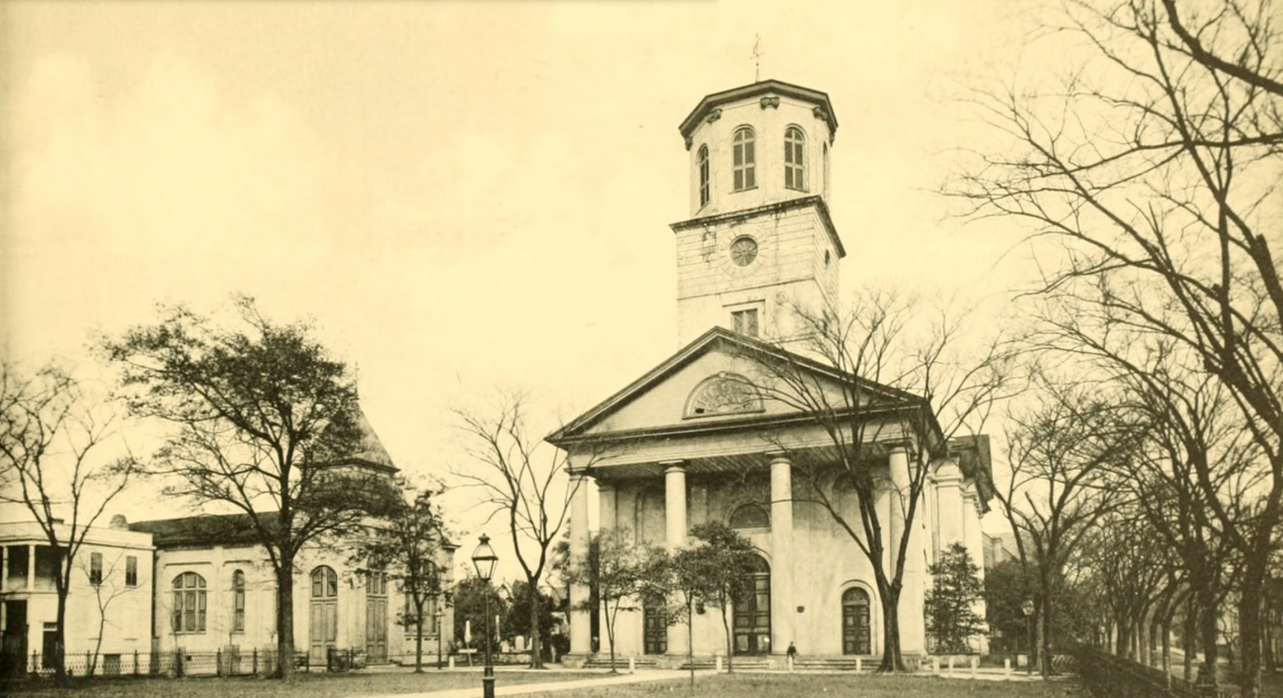
Second Presbyterian Church was photographed here in 1892.

== Architecture ==
The church, built in the Jeffersonian style is the fourth oldest church structure in the city. The brothers James and John Gordon were both the builders and the architects. The church's steeple was not completed due to structural issues that developed in its tower. The church bell was given to the Confederacy in 1862 for use as cannon metal. Before the Civil War, the galleries were used by the church's more than 200 black members. The sanctuary was completely renovated after a fire in 1959. Situated on one of the highest points in the city, the church appeared on mariners' maps as "Flynn's Church," so called after the first pastor.

The Classic Revival sanctuary is stuccoed brick with two tiers of windows, a square tower with an octagonal belfry, and a tetra Tuscan portico. The size of the sanctuary presented a problem because it strained the voices of the ministers. Therefore, in 1833 the floor was raised three feet, the ceiling lowered sixteen feet, and the rear wall of the nave moved to enlarge the vestibule. In addition, side doors on the north and south were closed and pews were added. The pews used today were installed in 1849. Church pews were rented with the rental fee also purchasing a space in the cemetery plot. This custom ended in 1924, but the numbers on the pews remain.

== Wragg Square ==
In front of the church is a long open space known as Wragg Square because it was dedicated to the public by the wealthy Wragg family from their extensive holdings in the neighborhood. In 1935, the city considered using Works Progress Administration funds to build a public auditorium on Wragg Square, but the church opposed the plans based on its long history as an open space. The auditorium was not built. In April 2024, a renovation of the square and its gardens was completed. The renovation included, pruning the laurel oaks damaged in multiple hurricanes and replacing trees at the end of their expected life cycle, while also installing new palmettos and live oaks. The lawns, paths, lighting, irrigation, and hardscape were also restored. The improvements were made in honor of Charleston residents, Patti and Peter McGee, who were dedicated to community service in the city, and parishoners of the church. The efforts were spearheaded by the couple's daughters, Madeleine and Evie McGee, and the latter's husband, Stephen Colbert, coordinating with Charleston’s director of parks, Jason Kronsberg, and Beverly Rivers, a member of the Charleston Horticultural Society. The McGee and Colbert families donated $100,000 through the Charleston Parks Conservancy, and will donate an additional $150,000 in three annual installments for park maintenance. The city matched the donation with $150,000.
