= Electoral history of Henry McMaster =

List of elections featuring Henry McMaster as a candidate

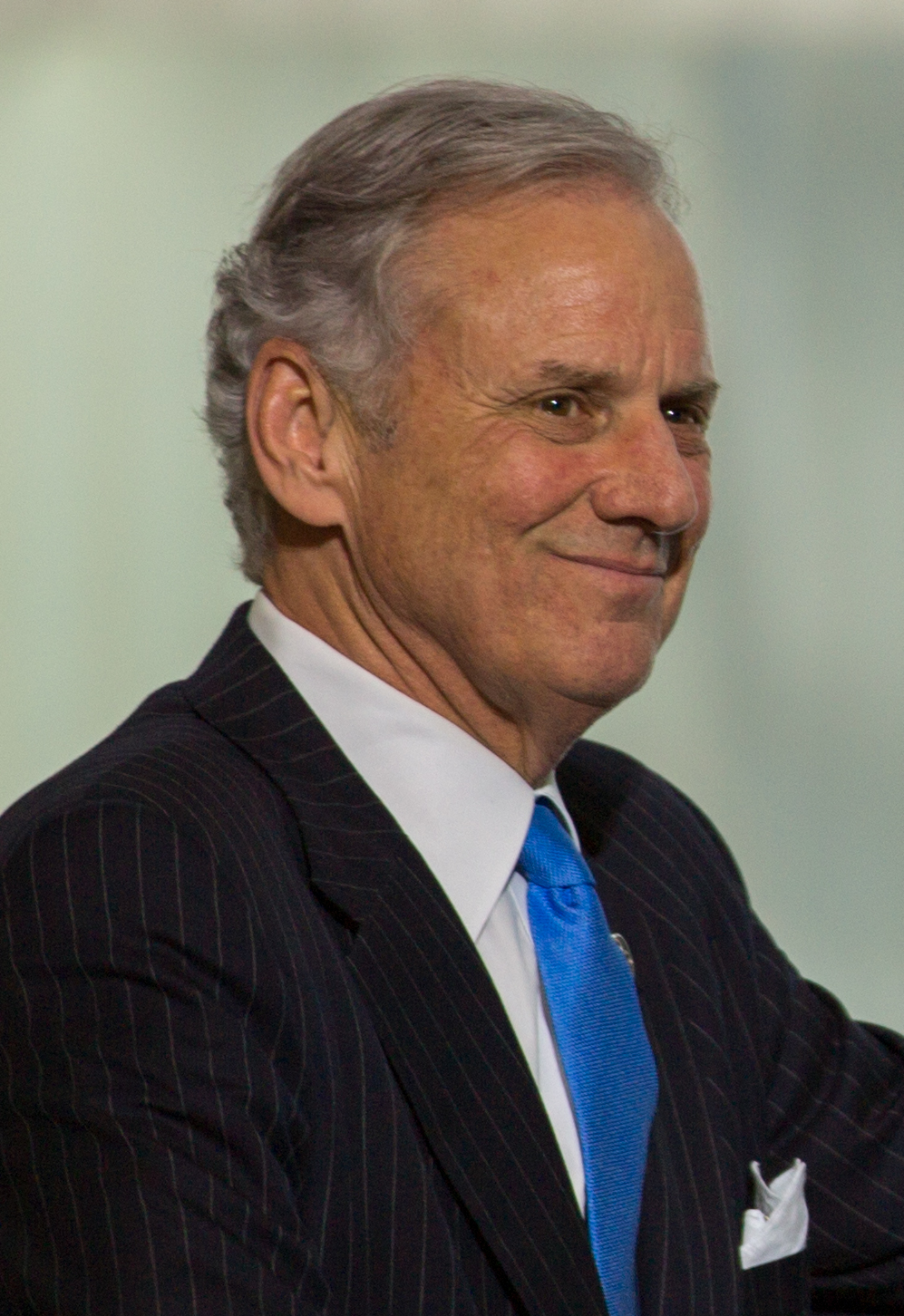
Henry McMaster 2017

This is an article about the electoral history of Henry McMaster.

Henry McMaster, a member of the Republican party, is the 117th Governor of South Carolina and assumed office January 24, 2017. He was elected the Attorney General of South Carolina, serving from 2003 to 2011, and Lieutenant Governor of South Carolina in 2014, serving from 2015 to 2017. Upon the resignation of Nikki Haley, McMaster became governor. In 2018, he was elected to a full term and he sought and he won reelection in the 2022 election. Additionally, he unsuccessfully ran for the U.S. Senate in 1986, lieutenant governor in 1990, and governor in 2010.

South Carolina Senate Election, 1986
Party	Candidate	Votes	%
Democratic	Ernest Hollings (incumbent)	463,354	63.10%
Republican	Henry McMaster	261,394	35.50%
Total votes		724,748	100
Democratic hold			

South Carolina Lt. Governor Election, 1990
Party	Candidate	Votes	%
Democratic	Nick Theodore (incumbent)	440,884	58.75%
Republican	Henry McMaster	309,038	41.19%
Total votes		749,922	100
Democratic hold			

South Carolina Attorney General Election, 2002
Party	Candidate	Votes	%
Republican	Henry McMaster	601,931	55.48%
Democratic	Stephen K. Benjamin	482,560	44.48%
Total votes		1,084,491	100
Republican hold			

South Carolina Attorney General Election, 2006 (Uncontested)
Party	Candidate	Votes	%
Republican	Henry McMaster (incumbent)	779,453	99.22%
None	Write-ins	6,107	0.78%
Total votes		785,560	100
Republican hold			

South Carolina Governor Republican Primary Election, 2010
Party	Candidate	Votes	%
Republican	Nikki Haley	206,326	48.86%
Republican	Gresham Barrett	91,824	21.75%
Republican	Henry McMaster	71,494	16.93%
Republican	Andre Bauer	52,607	12.46%
Total votes		422,251	100

South Carolina Lieutenant Governor Republican Primary Election, 2014
Party	Candidate	Votes	%
Republican	Henry McMaster	131,546	43.63%
Republican	Pat McKinney	73,134	21.75%
Republican	Mike Campbell	72,204	23.95%
Republican	Ray Moore	24,335	8.07%
Total votes		301,219	100

South Carolina Lieutenant Governor Republican Primary Runoff Election, 2014
Party	Candidate	Votes	%
Republican	Henry McMaster	85,301	63.58%
Republican	Mike Campbell	48,863	36.42%
Total votes		134,164	100

South Carolina Lieutenant Governor Election, 2014
Party	Candidate	Votes	%
Republican	Henry McMaster	726,821	58.75%
Democratic	Bakari Sellers	508,807	41.13%
none	Write-ins	1,514	0.12%
Total votes		1,237,142	100
Republican gain from Democratic			

South Carolina Gubernatiorial Republican Primary Election, 2018
Party	Candidate	Votes	%
Republican	Henry McMaster (incumbent)	155,072	42.3%
Republican	John Warren	102,006	27.8%
Republican	Catherine Templeton	78,432	21.4%
Republican	Kevin L. Bryant	24,699	6.7%
Republican	Yancey McGill	6,349	1.7%
Total votes		366,558	100

South Carolina Gubernatorial Republican Primary Runoff Election, 2018
Party	Candidate	Votes	%
Republican	Henry McMaster (incumbent)	183,820	53.6%
Republican	John Warren	158,921	46.4%
Total votes		342,741	100

South Carolina Gubernatiorial Election, 2018
Party	Candidate	Votes	%
Republican	Henry McMaster (incumbent)	921,342	53%
Democratic	James E. Smith Jr.	784,182	46%
Total votes		1,705,524	100
Republican hold			

South Carolina Gubernatiorial Republican Primary Election, 2022
Party	Candidate	Votes	%
Republican	Henry McMaster (incumbent)	306,216	83%
Republican	Harrison Musselwhite	61,473	17%
Total votes		367,689	100%

South Carolina Gubernatorial Election, 2022
Party	Candidate	Votes	%
Republican	Henry McMaster (incumbent)	988,501	58%
Democratic	Joe Cunningham	692,691	41%
Libertarian	Bruce Reeves	20,826	1%
Total votes		1,703,192	100%
Republican hold			
