= Hamilton R. Grant =

American politician

Member of the South Carolina House of Representatives from the 79th district
- Incumbent
- Assumed office 2025
- Preceded by: Ivory Torrey Thigpen

Personal details
- Party: Democratic

Hamilton R. Grant is an American politician. He is a member of the Democratic party.

== Early life and career ==
Grant leads “Grant Business Advisors,” a finance and strategy company. He served on the board of trustees of South Carolina State University.

== Political career ==
=== South Carolina House of Representatives ===
On February 14, 2024, Grant launched his bid for the House District 79 Seat. He announced after the news that incumbent Ivory Torrey Thigpen was running for the South Carolina Senate seat held by incumbent Mia McLeod, who had left the Democratic Party to become an Independent.

Grant defeated community activist Jonneika Farr in the June Democratic Primary. He went on to defeat Republican nominee Rebecca Madsen in the general election.

Grant was primary sponsor of a resolution honoring 803Fresh for his song Boots on the Ground and proclaiming May 6, 2025, 'Boots On The Ground Day".

== Personal life ==
Grant is married to Alana Simmons-Grant, granddaughter of the Rev. Daniel Lee Simmons Sr., who was one of the nine persons killed in the 2015 Charleston church shooting.
