= 2020 United States House of Representatives elections in South Carolina =

- November 3, 2020

All 7 South Carolina seats to the United States House of Representatives
	Majority party	Minority party
Party	Republican	Democratic
Last election	5	2
Seats won	6	1
Seat change	▲1	▼1
Popular vote	1,412,684	1,076,799
Percentage	56.38%	42.98%
Swing	▲2.09%	▼1.39%

Republican
50–60%
60–70%
70–80%
Democratic
40–50%
50–60%
60–70%
70–80%
Winners
Republican hold
Republican gain
Democratic hold

The 2020 United States House of Representatives elections in South Carolina were held on November 3, 2020, to elect the seven U.S. representatives from the state of South Carolina, one from each of the state's seven congressional districts. The elections coincided with the 2020 U.S. presidential election, other elections to the House of Representatives, elections to the United States Senate, and various state and local elections.

== Overview ==
District	Republican		Democratic		Others		Total		Result
District	Votes	%	Votes	%	Votes	%	Votes	%	Result
District 1	216,042	50.58%	210,627	49.31%	442	0.10%	427,111	100.0%	Republican gain
District 2	202,715	55.66%	155,118	42.59%	6,382	1.75%	364,215	100.0%	Republican hold
District 3	237,544	71.21%	95,712	28.69%	308	0.09%	333,564	100.0%	Republican hold
District 4	222,126	61.61%	133,023	36.89%	5,401	1.50%	360,550	100.0%	Republican hold
District 5	220,006	60.07%	145,979	39.86%	273	0.07%	366,258	100.0%	Republican hold
District 6	89,258	30.81%	197,477	68.18%	2,918	1.01%	289,653	100.0%	Democratic hold
District 7	224,993	61.80%	138,863	38.14%	235	0.06%	364,091	100.0%	Republican hold
Total	1,412,684	56.38%	1,076,799	42.98%	15,959	0.64%	2,505,442	100.0%	

Popular vote
Republican	56.38%
Democratic	42.98%
Other	0.64%

House seats
Republican	85.71%
Democratic	14.29%

== District 1 ==
2020 South Carolina's 1st congressional district election
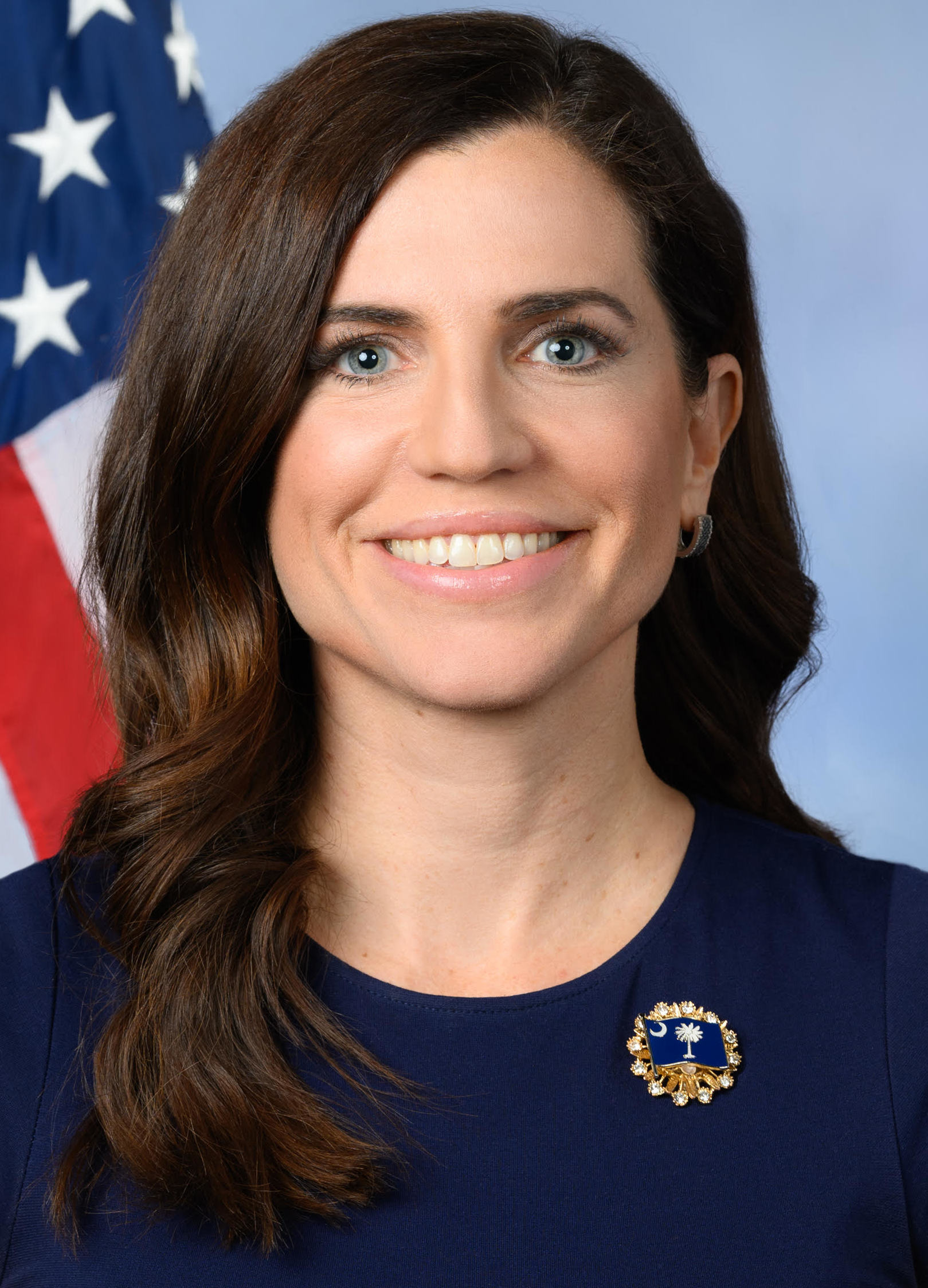

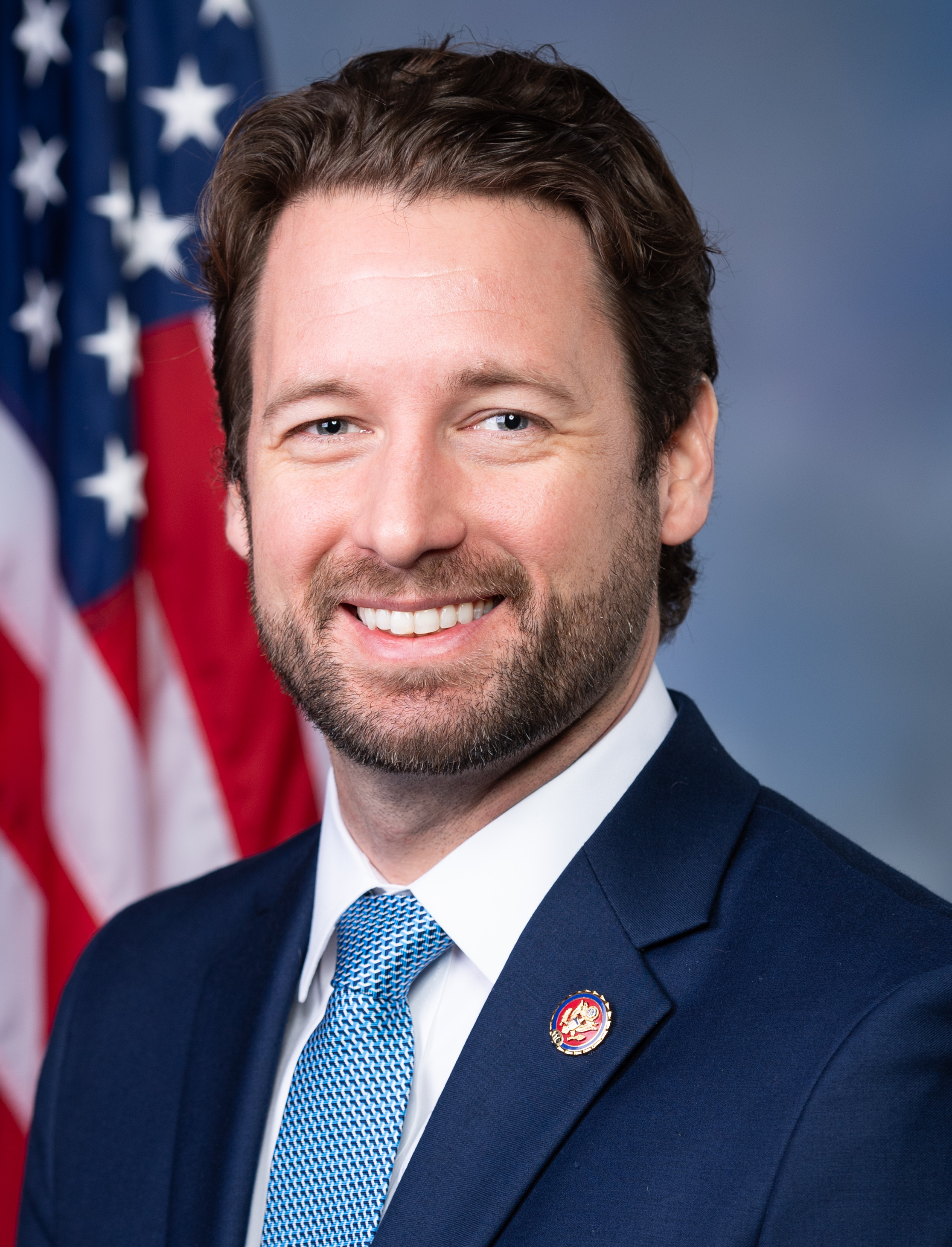
Nominee	Nancy Mace	Joe Cunningham
Party	Republican	Democratic
Popular vote	216,042	210,627
Percentage	50.6%	49.3%
- Mace: 50–60% 60–70% 70–80% 80–90% Cunningham: 50–60% 60–70% 70–80% 80–90% >90% Tie: 50% No votes
U.S. Representative before election
Joe Cunningham
Democratic
Elected U.S. Representative
Nancy Mace
Republican

The 1st district straddles the Atlantic coast of the state, and includes most of Charleston. The incumbent was Democrat Joe Cunningham, who flipped the district and was first elected with 50.6% of the vote in 2018. Cunningham narrowly lost his seat to Republican state Representative Nancy Mace in 2020. Once a solidly Republican district, the 1st district had become competitive in recent elections due to the realignment of Charleston's suburban population to the Democratic Party. However, increased turnout in the heavily conservative Beaufort area undermined this trend, allowing Mace to overcome Cunningham's margin in Charleston County.

=== Democratic primary ===
==== Candidates ====
===== Nominee =====
- Joe Cunningham, incumbent U.S. representative

=== Republican primary ===
==== Candidates ====
===== Nominee =====
- Nancy Mace, state representative and candidate for U.S. Senate in 2014

===== Eliminated in primary =====
- Chris Cox, founder of Bikers for Trump
- Kathy Landing, Mount Pleasant councilwoman
- Brad Mole, Bluffton housing official

===== Withdrawn =====
- Mike Covert, Beaufort County councilman
- Logan Cunningham, teacher

===== Declined =====
- Katie Arrington, former state representative and nominee for this district in 2018
- Chip Campsen, state senator
- Tom Davis, state senator
- Larry Grooms, state senator
- Larry Kobrovsky, chair of the Charleston County Republican Party
- Sam McCown, doctor
- Peter McCoy, state representative and candidate for this district in 2013
- Weston J. Newton, state representative
- Samuel Rivers Jr., former state representative
- Mark Sanford, former U.S. representative, former governor of South Carolina, and candidate for president in 2020
- Mike Seekings, Charleston city councilman
- Elliott Summey, Charleston County councilman
- Catherine Templeton, attorney and candidate for governor in 2018
- Teddy Turner, teacher, entrepreneur, and candidate for this district in 2013

==== Endorsements ====
Kathy Landing

Federal officials

- Jim DeMint, former U.S. senator from South Carolina (2005–13), U.S. representative for South Carolina's 4th congressional district (1999–2005)
- Sue Myrick, former U.S. representative for North Carolina's 9th congressional district (1995–2013)
- Randy Neugebauer, former U.S. representative for Texas's 19th congressional district (2003–2017)

Organizations

- House Freedom Fund
- Republican Main Street Partnership PAC

==== Polling ====
Poll source	Date(s) administered	Sample size (Note: Key: A – all adults RV – registered voters LV – likely voters V – unclear)	Margin of error	Mike Covert	Chris Cox	Kathy Landing	Nancy Mace	Other	Undecided
WPAi/Club for Growth	April 20–21, 2020	401 (LV)	± 4.4%	–	8%	13%	42%	3% (Note: Brad Mole with 3%)	34%
Club For Growth	October 15–16, 2019	400 (V)	–	8%	8%	5%	23%	–	57%
First Tuesday Strategies	October 4–7, 2019	500 (LV)	± 4.4%	3%	3%	3%	19%	–	60%

Hypothetical polling

Poll source	Date(s) administered	Sample size	Margin of error	Katie Arrington	Tom Davis	Larry Grooms	Nancy Mace	Peter McCoy	Weston Newton	Mark Sanford	Elliott Summey	Catherine Templeton	Teddy Turner	Maria Walls	Undecided
The Trafalgar Group	January 28 – February 1, 2019	2,479 (LV)	± 2.0%	26%	7%	6%	5%	2%	3%	23%	1%	3%	1%	1%	22%
The Trafalgar Group	January 28 – February 1, 2019	2,479 (LV)	± 2.0%	31%	8%	7%	7%	2%	3%	–	3%	5%	2%	1%	32%
The Trafalgar Group	January 28 – February 1, 2019	2,479 (LV)	± 2.0%	–	8%	7%	5%	6%	4%	37%	3%	6%	2%	1%	22%
PMI/Ivory Tusk Consulting	November 8–10, 2018	2,291 (LV)	± 2.0%	32%	9%	4%	7%	–	3%	26%	–	3%	–	1%	15%

==== Primary results ====
Republican primary results
Party	Candidate	Votes	%
Republican	Nancy Mace	48,411	57.5
Republican	Kathy Landing	21,835	25.9
Republican	Chris Cox	8,179	9.7
Republican	Brad Mole	5,800	6.9
Total votes		84,225	100.0

=== General election ===
==== Predictions ====
Source	Ranking	As of
The Cook Political Report	Lean D	November 2, 2020
Inside Elections	Lean D	October 28, 2020
Sabato's Crystal Ball	Lean D	November 2, 2020
Daily Kos	Lean D	November 2, 2020
RCP	Tossup	November 2, 2020
DDHQ	Tossup	November 3, 2020
538	Lean D	November 3, 2020
Politico	Lean D	November 2, 2020
Niskanen	Lean D	July 26, 2020

==== Debate ====
2020 South Carolina's 1st congressional district election debate
No.	Date & time	Host	Location	Moderators	Participants	
Key: P Participant N Non-invitee					Democratic	Republican
Key: P Participant N Non-invitee					U.S. representative Joe Cunningham	State representative Nancy Mace
1	September 29, 2020; 7:00 p.m. EDT	South Carolina ETV	Beaufort, South Carolina	Gavin Jackson; Jamie Lovegrove	P	P

- Complete video of debate Archive

==== Endorsements ====
Joe Cunningham (D)

Executive branch officials

- Barack Obama, 44th president of the United States (2009–2017), former U.S. senator from Illinois (2005–2008)

Federal officials

- Amy Klobuchar, U.S. senator from Minnesota (2007–present)

Individuals

- Alex Hirsch, animator, writer, and artist

Organizations

- 314 Action
- Black Economic Alliance
- End Citizens United
- Human Rights Campaign
- Humane Society of the United States Legislative Fund
- League of Conservation Voters Action Fund
- Planned Parenthood
- Sierra Club
Nancy Mace (R)

Executive branch officials

- Donald Trump, 45th president of the United States (2017–2021)

Federal officials

- Kevin McCarthy, U.S. representative for California's 23rd congressional district (2007–present), former House majority leader (2014–2019), and House minority leader (2019–2023)
- Rand Paul, U.S. senator from Kentucky (2011–present)
- Elise Stefanik, U.S. representative for New York's 21st congressional district (2015–present)

Organizations

- EPAC

==== Fundraising ====
Campaign finance reports as of December 31, 2020
Candidate (party)	Total receipts	Total disbursements	Cash on hand
Joe Cunningham (D)	$7,085,878	$7,138,095	$6,371
Nancy Mace (R)	$5,873,153	$5,813,666	$59,487
Source: Federal Election Commission

==== Polling ====
Poll source	Date(s) administered	Sample size	Margin of error	Joe Cunningham (D)	Nancy Mace (R)	Other	Undecided
Strategic National (R) (Note: Poll sponsored by Mace's campaign.)	October 14–16, 2020	400 (LV)	–	45%	47%	–	–
GQR Research (D) (Note: Poll sponsored by the DCCC.)	October 5–7, 2020 (Note: Additional data sourced from FiveThirtyEight)	400 (LV)	–	55%	42%	–	–
First Tuesday Strategies (R)	May 15–18, 2020	500 (LV)	± 4.4%	44%	45%	2% (Note: "Someone else" with 2%)	9%

Hypothetical polling

with Joe Cunningham and Kathy Landing

Poll source	Date(s) administered	Sample size	Margin of error	Joe Cunningham (D)	Kathy Landing (R)	Other	Undecided
First Tuesday Strategies (R)	May 15–18, 2020	500 (LV)	± 4.4%	43%	45%	4% (Note: "Someone else" with 4%)	8%

with Generic Democrat and Generic Republican

Poll source	Date(s) administered	Sample size	Margin of error	Generic Democrat	Generic Republican	Other	Undecided
First Tuesday Strategies (R)	May 15–18, 2020	500 (LV)	± 4.4%	31%	50%	4% (Note: "Other party" with 4%)	16% (Note: "Depends on the candidate" with 14%; "not sure" with 1%)

==== Results ====
South Carolina's 1st congressional district, 2020
Party	Candidate	Votes	%
Republican	Nancy Mace	216,042	50.6
Democratic	Joe Cunningham (incumbent)	210,627	49.3
Write-in		442	0.1
Total votes		427,111	100.0
Republican gain from Democratic			

By county

County	Nancy Mace Republican		Joe Cunningham Democratic		Write-in		Margin		Total votes
County	#	%	#	%	#	%	#	%	Total votes
Beaufort (part)	50,358	54.60	41,809	45.33	66	0.07	8,549	9.27	92,233
Berkeley (part)	50,944	55.44	40,823	44.42	130	0.14	10,121	11.02	91,897
Charleston (part)	78,962	45.05	96,142	54.85	162	0.09	−17,180	−9.80	175,266
Colleton (part)	682	71.26	275	28.74	0	0.00	407	42.52	957
Dorchester (part)	35,096	52.57	31,578	47.30	84	0.13	3,518	5.27	66,758
Totals	216,042	50.58	210,627	49.31	442	0.10	5,415	1.27	427,111

== District 2 ==
2020 South Carolina's 2nd congressional district election
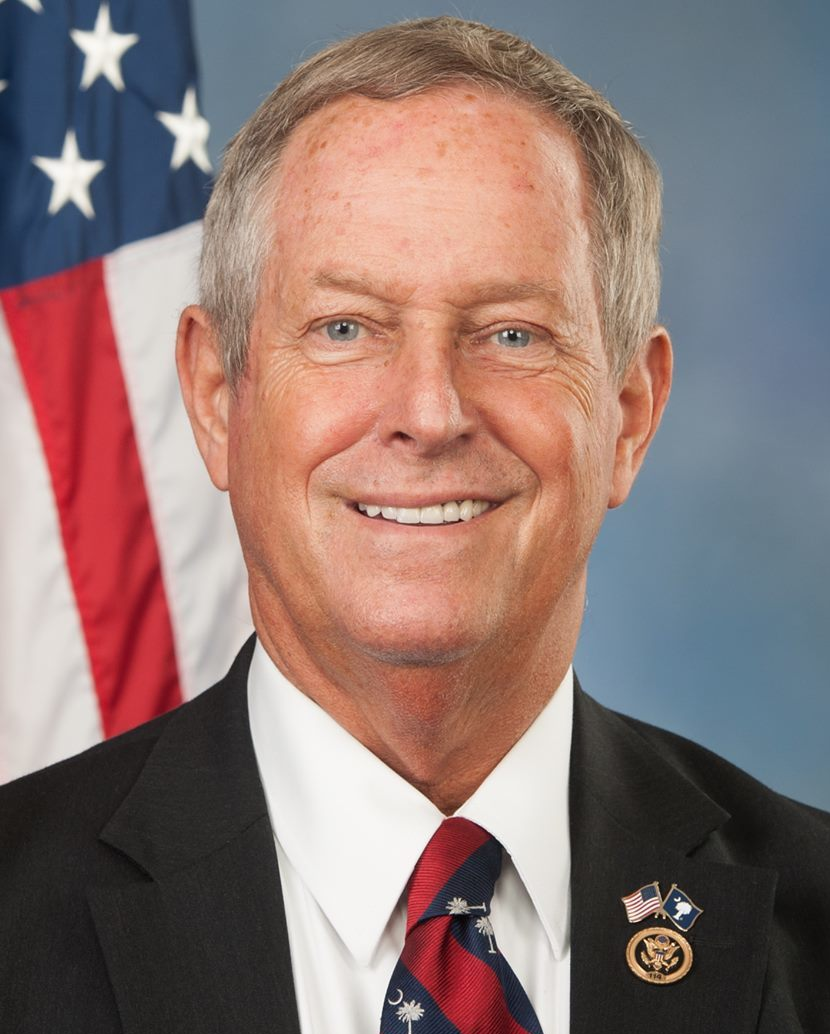

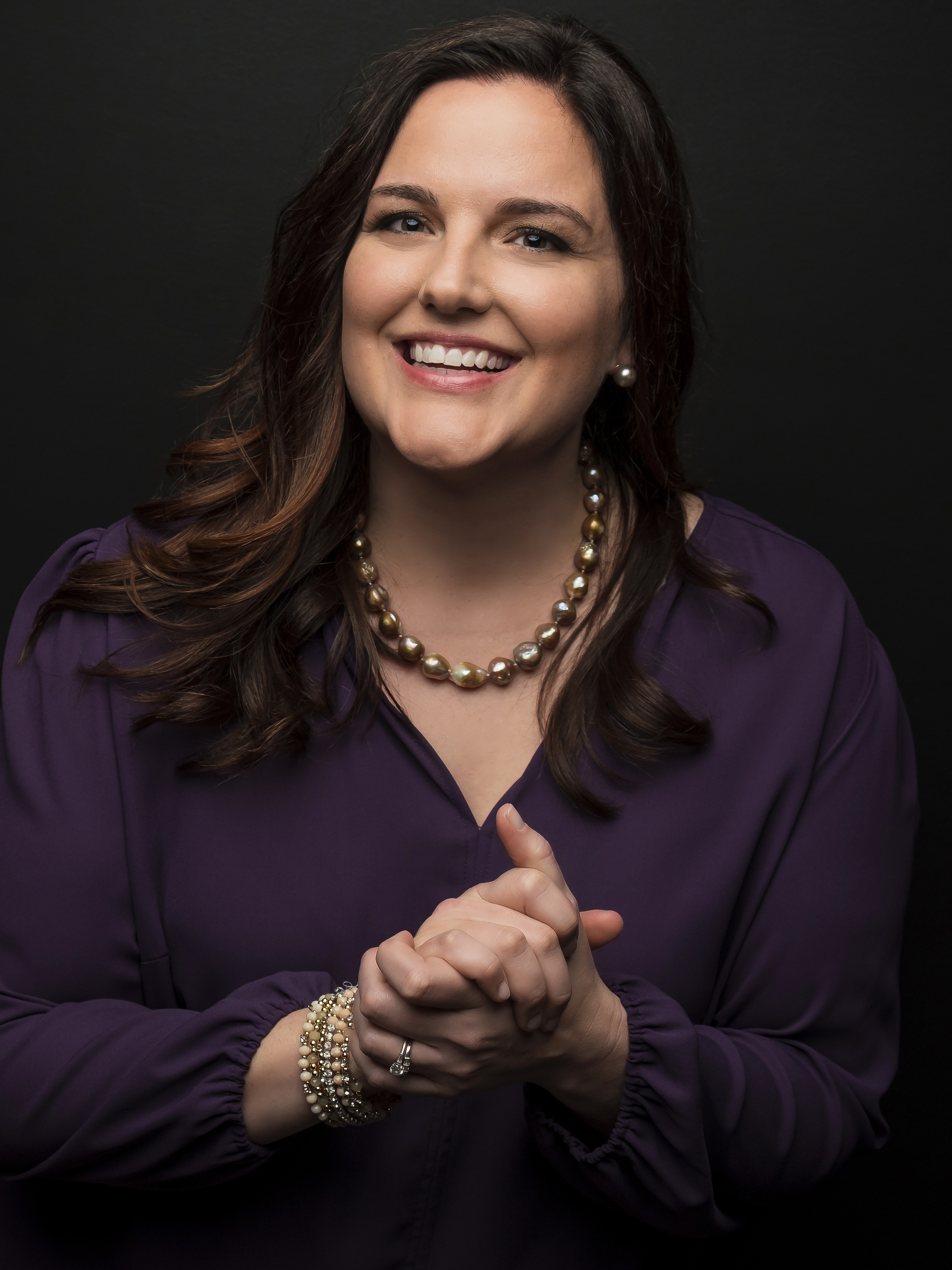
Nominee	Joe Wilson	Adair Boroughs
Party	Republican	Democratic
Popular vote	202,715	155,118
Percentage	55.7%	42.6%
- Wilson: 40–50% 50–60% 60–70% 70–80% 80–90% >90% Boroughs: 40–50% 50–60% 60–70% 70–80% 80–90% No data
U.S. Representative before election
Joe Wilson
Republican
Elected U.S. Representative
Joe Wilson
Republican

The 2nd district is located in central South Carolina and spans from Columbia to the South Carolina side of the Augusta, Georgia metropolitan area, including North Augusta. The incumbent was Republican Joe Wilson, who was re-elected with 56.3% of the vote in 2018.

=== Republican primary ===
==== Candidates ====
===== Nominee =====
- Joe Wilson, incumbent U.S. representative

===== Eliminated in primary =====
- Michael Bishop

==== Primary results ====
Republican primary results
Party	Candidate	Votes	%
Republican	Joe Wilson (incumbent)	55,557	74.1
Republican	Michael Bishop	19,397	25.9
Total votes		74,954	100.0

=== Democratic primary ===
==== Candidates ====
===== Nominee =====
- Adair Boroughs, attorney

===== Withdrawn =====
- Lawrence Nathaniel, activist

===== Declined =====
- Brenda K. Sanders, former judge for Michigan's 36th District Court

=== General election ===
==== Predictions ====
Source	Ranking	As of
The Cook Political Report	Solid R	November 2, 2020
Inside Elections	Solid R	October 28, 2020
Sabato's Crystal Ball	Likely R	November 2, 2020
Daily Kos	Likely R	November 2, 2020
RCP	Safe R	November 2, 2020
DDHQ	Likely R	November 3, 2020
538	Solid R	November 3, 2020
Politico	Likely R	November 2, 2020
Niskanen	Safe R	July 26, 2020

==== Debate ====
2020 South Carolina's 2nd congressional district election debate
No.	Date & time	Host	Location	Moderators	Participants	
Key: P Participant N Non-invitee					Republican	Democratic
Key: P Participant N Non-invitee					U.S. representative Joe Wilson	Attorney Adair Boroughs
1	October 20, 2020; 7:00 p.m. EDT	River Bluff High School	Lexington, South Carolina	Judi Gatson; Avery Wilks	P	P

- Complete video of debate

==== Endorsements ====
Adair Boroughs

Executive branch officials

- Richard Riley, former United States secretary of education (1993–2001), governor of South Carolina (1979–1987)
- Inez Tenenbaum, former chair of the United States Consumer Product Safety Commission (2009–2013), South Carolina superintendent of education (1999–2007)

Federal officials

- Jim Clyburn, U.S. representative for South Carolina's 6th congressional district (1993–present), House majority whip (2007–2011, 2019–2023)

State officials

- Justin Bamberg, state representative (2014–present)
- Jim Hodges, former governor of South Carolina (1999–2003)
- Lonnie Hosey, state representative (1999–present)
- Brad Hutto, state senator (1996–present), nominee for U.S. Senate in 2014
- Mia McLeod, state senator (2016–present)
- Russell Ott, state representative (2013–present)
- Seth Rose, state representative (2018–present)
- Todd Rutherford, state representative (1998–present), minority leader of the South Carolina House of Representatives (2013–present)
- Ivory Thigpen, state representative (2016–present)

Local officials

- Steve Benjamin, mayor of Columbia (2010–2022)

Individuals

- Rachel Hodges, former First Lady of South Carolina (1999–2003)

Organizations

- EMILY's List
- End Citizens United
- Ironworkers Local 846
- National Organization for Women PAC
- National Women's Political Caucus
- Sierra Club

==== Fundraising ====
Campaign finance reports as of December 31, 2020
Candidate (party)	Total receipts	Total disbursements	Cash on hand
Joe Wilson (R)	$1,686,288	$1,762,180	$74,366
Adair Boroughs (D)	$2,537,935	$2,535,073	$2,862
Source: Federal Election Commission

==== Results ====
South Carolina's 2nd congressional district, 2020
Party	Candidate	Votes	%
Republican	Joe Wilson (incumbent)	202,715	55.7
Democratic	Adair Boroughs	155,118	42.6
Constitution	Kathleen Wright	6,163	1.7
Write-in		219	0.1
Total votes		364,215	100.0
Republican hold			

By county

County	Joe Wilson Republican		Adair Ford Boroughs Democratic		Kathleen Wright Constitution		Write-in		Margin		Total votes
County	#	%	#	%	#	%	#	%	#	%	Total votes
Aiken	52,331	61.54	31,367	36.89	1,288	1.51	51	0.06	20,964	24.65	85,037
Barnwell	5,386	52.24	4,807	46.62	117	1.13	1	0.01	579	5.62	10,311
Lexington	92,872	64.37	48,515	33.63	2,806	1.94	86	0.06	44,357	30.74	144,279
Orangeburg (part)	4,494	49.71	4,464	49.38	83	0.92	0	0.00	30	0.33	9,041
Richland (part)	47,632	41.22	65,965	57.09	1,869	1.62	81	0.07	−18,333	−15.87	115,547
Totals	202,715	55.66	155,118	42.59	6,163	1.69	219	0.06	47,597	13.07	364,215

Counties that flipped from Democratic to Republican

- Orangeburg (largest municipality: Orangeburg)

== District 3 ==
2020 South Carolina's 3rd congressional district election
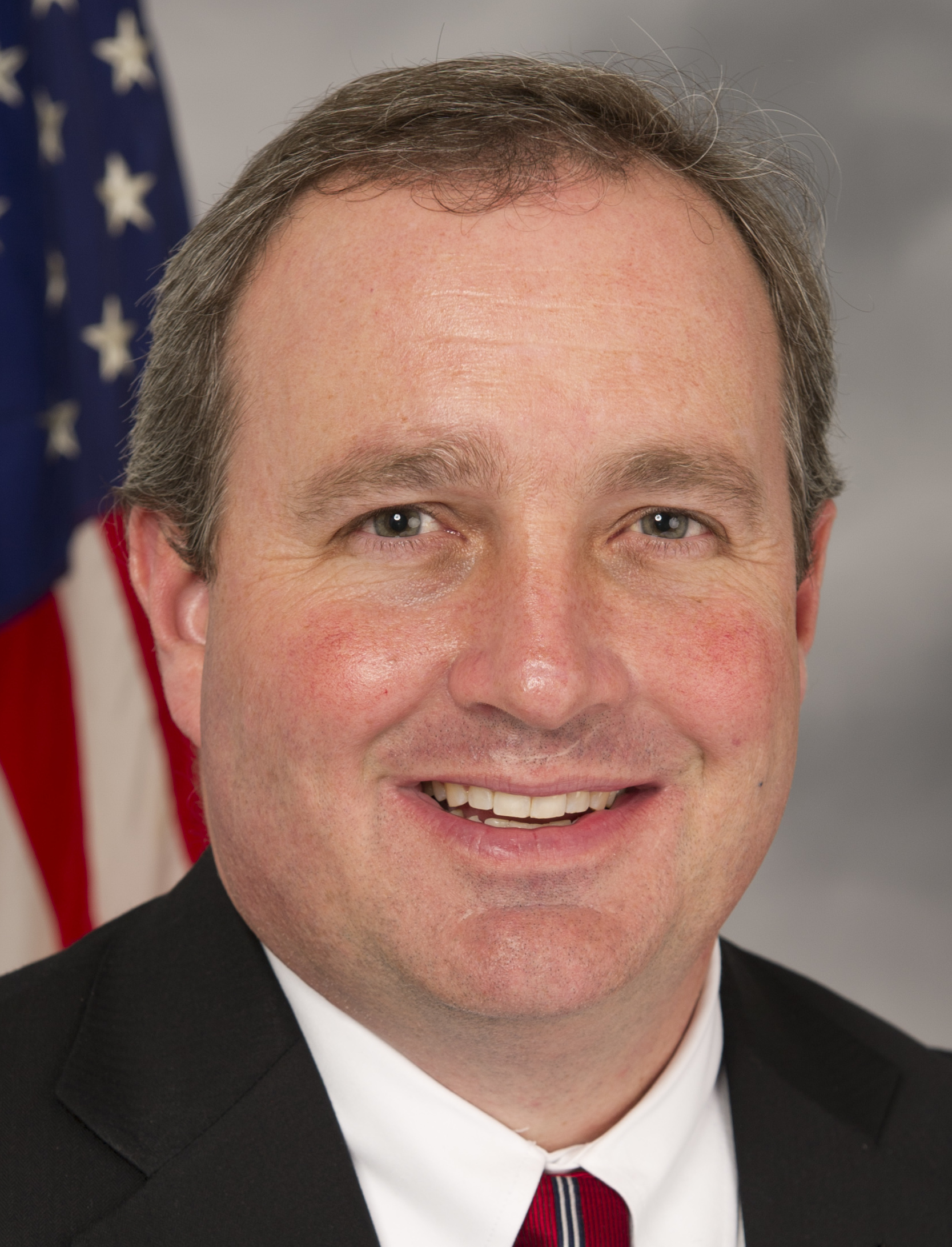

Nominee	Jeff Duncan	Hosea Cleveland
Party	Republican	Democratic
Popular vote	237,544	95,712
Percentage	71.2%	28.7%
- Duncan: 50–60% 60–70% 70–80% 80–90% >90% Cleveland: 50–60% 60–70% 70–80% 80–90%
U.S. Representative before election
Jeff Duncan
Republican
Elected U.S. Representative
Jeff Duncan
Republican

The 3rd district takes in the Piedmont area in northwestern South Carolina, including Anderson and Greenwood. The incumbent was Republican Jeff Duncan, who was re-elected with 67.8% of the vote in 2018.

=== Republican primary ===
==== Candidates ====
===== Nominee =====
- Jeff Duncan, incumbent U.S. representative

=== Democratic primary ===
==== Candidates ====
===== Nominee =====
- Hosea Cleveland, veteran and candidate for this district in 2014 and 2016

===== Eliminated in primary =====
- Mark Welch

==== Primary results ====
Democratic primary results
Party	Candidate	Votes	%
Democratic	Hosea Cleveland	11,769	57.3
Democratic	Mark D. Welch	8,753	42.7
Total votes		20,522	100.0

=== General election ===
==== Predictions ====
Source	Ranking	As of
The Cook Political Report	Solid R	November 2, 2020
Inside Elections	Solid R	October 28, 2020
Sabato's Crystal Ball	Safe R	November 2, 2020
Daily Kos	Safe R	November 2, 2020
RCP	Safe R	November 2, 2020
DDHQ	Safe R	November 3, 2020
538	Solid R	November 3, 2020
Politico	Solid R	November 2, 2020
Niskanen	Safe R	July 26, 2020

==== Fundraising ====
Campaign finance reports as of December 31, 2020
Candidate (party)	Total receipts	Total disbursements	Cash on hand
Jeff Duncan (R)	$1,527,352	$1,289,577	$482,411
Hosea Cleveland (D)	$43,214	$45,106	$0
Source: Federal Election Commission

==== Results ====
South Carolina's 3rd congressional district, 2020
Party	Candidate	Votes	%
Republican	Jeff Duncan (incumbent)	237,544	71.2
Democratic	Hosea Cleveland	95,712	28.7
Write-in		308	0.1
Total votes		333,564	100.0
Republican hold			

By county

County	Jeff Duncan Republican		Hosea Cleveland Democratic		Write-in		Margin		Total votes
County	#	%	#	%	#	%	#	%	Total votes
Abbeville	8,437	68.11	3,938	31.79	12	0.10	4,499	36.32	12,387
Anderson	70,455	73.67	25,106	26.25	73	0.08	45349	47.42	95,634
Edgefield	8,428	63.41	4,859	36.56	4	0.03	3,569	26.85	13,291
Greenville (part)	21,453	63.25	12,437	36.67	26	0.08	9,016	26.58	33,916
Greenwood	20,416	64.09	11,410	35.82	30	0.09	9,006	28.27	31,856
Laurens	20,692	68.00	9,702	31.89	34	0.11	10,990	36.11	30,428
McCormick	3,092	54.24	2,607	45.73	2	0.04	485	8.51	5,701
Newberry (part)	2,458	71.75	968	28.25	0	0.00	1,490	43.50	3,426
Oconee	30,983	76.58	9,426	23.30	50	0.12	21,557	53.28	40,459
Pickens	44,754	78.18	12,416	21.69	72	0.13	32,338	56.49	57,242
Saluda	6,376	69.12	2,843	30.82	5	0.05	3,533	38.30	9,224
Totals	237,544	71.21	95,712	28.69	308	0.09	141,832	42.52	333,564

== District 4 ==
2020 South Carolina's 4th congressional district election
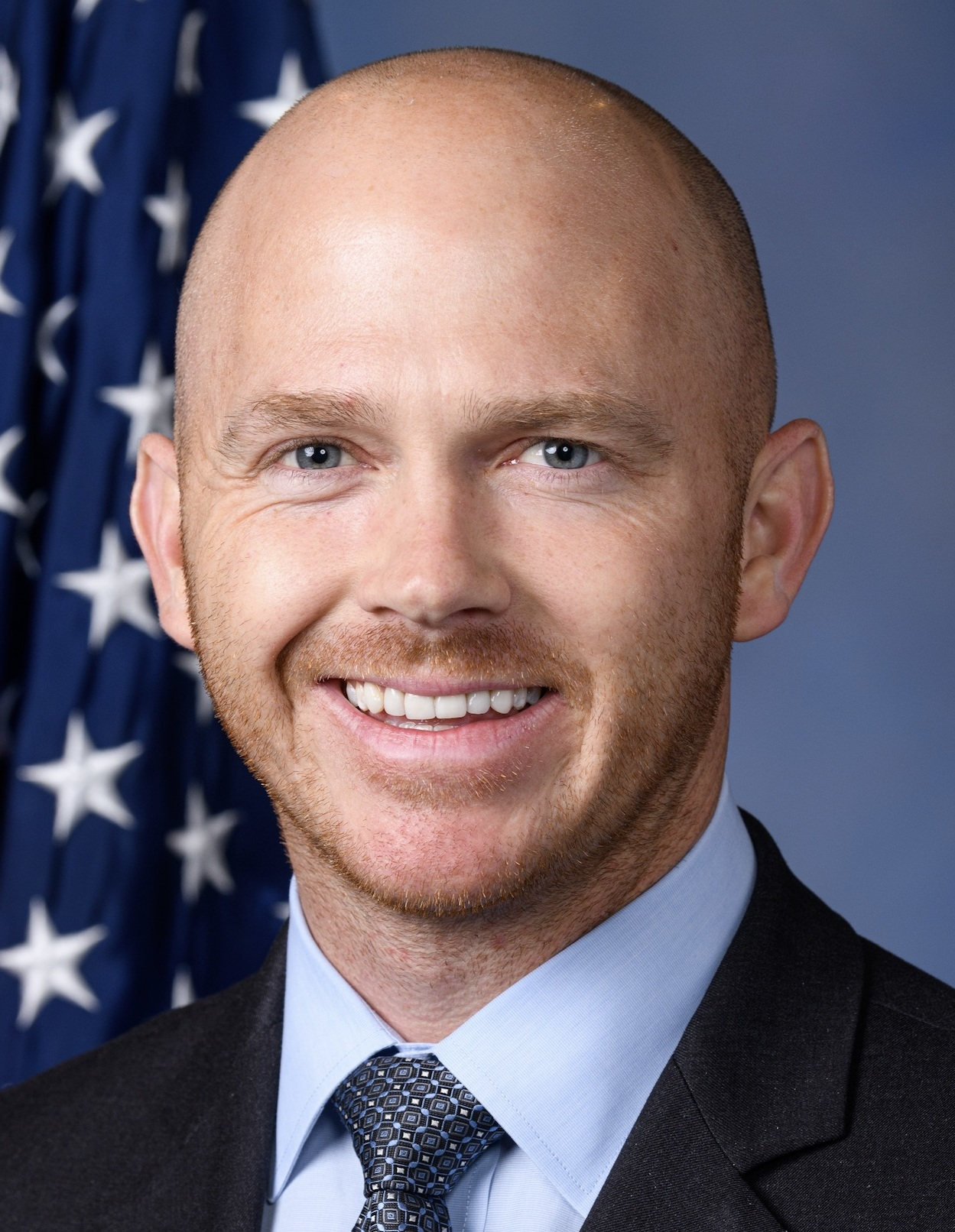

Nominee	William Timmons	Kim Nelson
Party	Republican	Democratic
Popular vote	222,126	133,023
Percentage	61.6%	36.9%
- Timmons: 40–50% 50–60% 60–70% 70–80% 80–90% Nelson: 40–50% 50–60% 60–70% 70–80% 80–90% >90%
U.S. Representative before election
William Timmons
Republican
Elected U.S. Representative
William Timmons
Republican

The 4th district is located in Upstate South Carolina, taking in Greenville and Spartanburg. The incumbent was Republican William Timmons, who was first elected with 59.6% of the vote in 2018.

=== Republican primary ===
==== Candidates ====
===== Nominee =====
- William Timmons, incumbent U.S. representative

=== Democratic primary ===
==== Candidates ====
===== Nominee =====
- Kim Nelson, public health advocate

=== General election ===
==== Predictions ====
Source	Ranking	As of
The Cook Political Report	Solid R	November 2, 2020
Inside Elections	Solid R	October 28, 2020
Sabato's Crystal Ball	Safe R	November 2, 2020
Daily Kos	Safe R	November 2, 2020
RCP	Safe R	November 2, 2020
DDHQ	Safe R	November 3, 2020
538	Solid R	November 3, 2020
Politico	Solid R	November 2, 2020
Niskanen	Safe R	July 26, 2020

==== Fundraising ====
Campaign finance reports as of December 31, 2020
Candidate (party)	Total receipts	Total disbursements	Cash on hand
William Timmons (R)	$1,363,583	$1,368,033	$8,690
Kim Nelson (D)	$168,860	$168,543	$317
Source: Federal Election Commission

==== Results ====
South Carolina's 4th congressional district, 2020
Party	Candidate	Votes	%
Republican	William Timmons (incumbent)	222,126	61.6
Democratic	Kim Nelson	133,023	36.9
Constitution	Michael Chandler	5,090	1.4
Write-in		311	0.1
Total votes		360,550	100.0
Republican hold			

By county

County	William Timmons Republican		Kim Nelson Democratic		Michael Chandler Constitution		Write-in		Margin		Total votes
County	#	%	#	%	#	%	#	%	#	%	Total votes
Greenville (part)	135,460	60.82	83,995	37.72	3,061	1.37	190	0.09	51,465	23.10	222,706
Spartanburg (part)	86,666	62.87	49,028	35.57	2,029	1.47	121	0.09	37,638	27.30	137,844
Totals	222,126	61.61	133,023	36.89	5,090	1.41	311	0.09	89,103	24.72	360,550

== District 5 ==
2020 South Carolina's 5th congressional district election
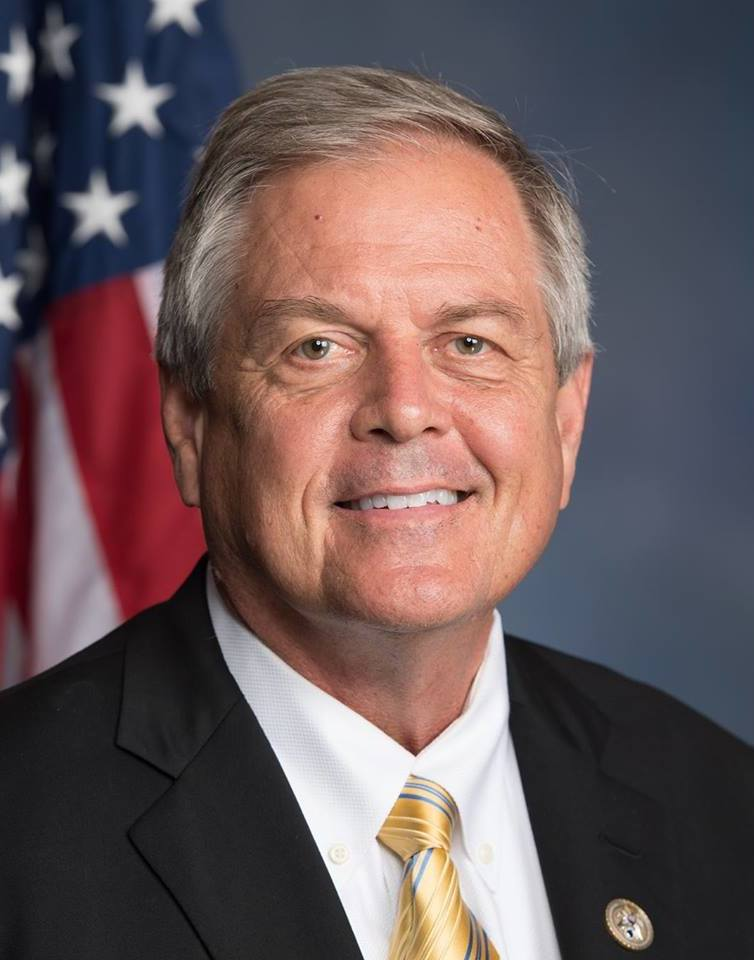

Nominee	Ralph Norman	Moe Brown
Party	Republican	Democratic
Popular vote	220,006	145,979
Percentage	60.1%	39.9%
- Norman: 50–60% 60–70% 70–80% 80–90% >90% Brown: 50–60% 60–70% 70–80% 80–90% >90% Tie: 50%
U.S. Representative before election
Ralph Norman
Republican
Elected U.S. Representative
Ralph Norman
Republican

The 5th district is located in northern South Carolina and encompasses the southern suburbs and exurbs of Charlotte, including Rock Hill. The incumbent was Republican Ralph Norman, who was re-elected with 57.0% of the vote in 2018.

=== Republican primary ===
==== Candidates ====
===== Nominee =====
- Ralph Norman, incumbent U.S. representative

=== Democratic primary ===
==== Candidates ====
===== Nominee =====
- Moe Brown, former University of South Carolina football player

===== Eliminated in primary =====
- Sidney A. Moore, former York County councilmember

==== Primary results ====
Democratic primary results
Party	Candidate	Votes	%
Democratic	Moe Brown	32,018	67.9
Democratic	Sidney A. Moore	15,127	32.1
Total votes		47,145	100.0

=== General election ===
==== Predictions ====
Source	Ranking	As of
The Cook Political Report	Solid R	November 2, 2020
Inside Elections	Solid R	October 28, 2020
Sabato's Crystal Ball	Safe R	November 2, 2020
Daily Kos	Safe R	November 2, 2020
RCP	Safe R	November 2, 2020
DDHQ	Safe R	November 3, 2020
538	Solid R	November 3, 2020
Politico	Solid R	November 2, 2020
Niskanen	Safe R	July 26, 2020

==== Fundraising ====
Campaign finance reports as of December 31, 2020
Candidate (party)	Total receipts	Total disbursements	Cash on hand
Ralph Norman (R)	$1,041,650	$910,151	$727,939
Moe Brown (D)	$487,658	$484,305	$3,353
Source: Federal Election Commission

==== Results ====
South Carolina's 5th congressional district, 2020
Party	Candidate	Votes	%
Republican	Ralph Norman (incumbent)	220,006	60.1
Democratic	Moe Brown	145,979	39.9
Write-in		273	0.1
Total votes		366,258	100.0
Republican hold			

By county

County	Ralph Norman Republican		Moe Brown Democratic		Write-in		Margin		Total votes
County	#	%	#	%	#	%	#	%	Total votes
Cherokee	18,232	72.45	6,914	27.48	18	0.07	11,318	44.97	25,164
Chester	8,798	56.03	6,898	43.93	7	0.04	1,900	12.10	15,703
Fairfield	4,770	39.43	7,315	60.47	12	0.10	−2,545	−21.04	12,097
Kershaw	21,212	63.43	12,207	36.50	24	0.07	9,005	26.93	33,443
Lancaster	31,493	63.40	18,161	36.56	22	0.04	13,332	26.84	49,676
Lee	3,056	36.27	5,359	63.60	11	0.13	−2,303	−27.33	8,426
Newberry (part)	9,433	62.52	5,650	37.45	5	0.03	3,783	25.07	15,088
Richland (part) (Note: 2020 is the only election in which Richland County was included as part of this iteration of the 5th district; the returns from a small portion of a single precinct (Pontiac 2) make up the entirety of ballots cast by Richland voters in the district's election for U.S. representative. As such, its presence is not reflected in either the county or precinct result maps.)	1	4.55	21	95.45	0	0.00	−20	−90.90	22
Spartanburg (part)	7,932	80.35	1,935	19.60	5	0.05	5,997	60.75	9,872
Sumter (part)	19,844	49.44	20,251	50.45	42	0.10	−407	−1.01	40,137
Union	8,191	62.19	4,963	37.68	16	0.12	3,228	24.51	13,170
York	87,044	60.67	56,305	39.25	111	0.08	30,739	21.42	143,460
Totals	220,006	60.07	145,979	39.86	273	0.07	74,027	20.21	366,258

== District 6 ==
2020 South Carolina's 6th congressional district election
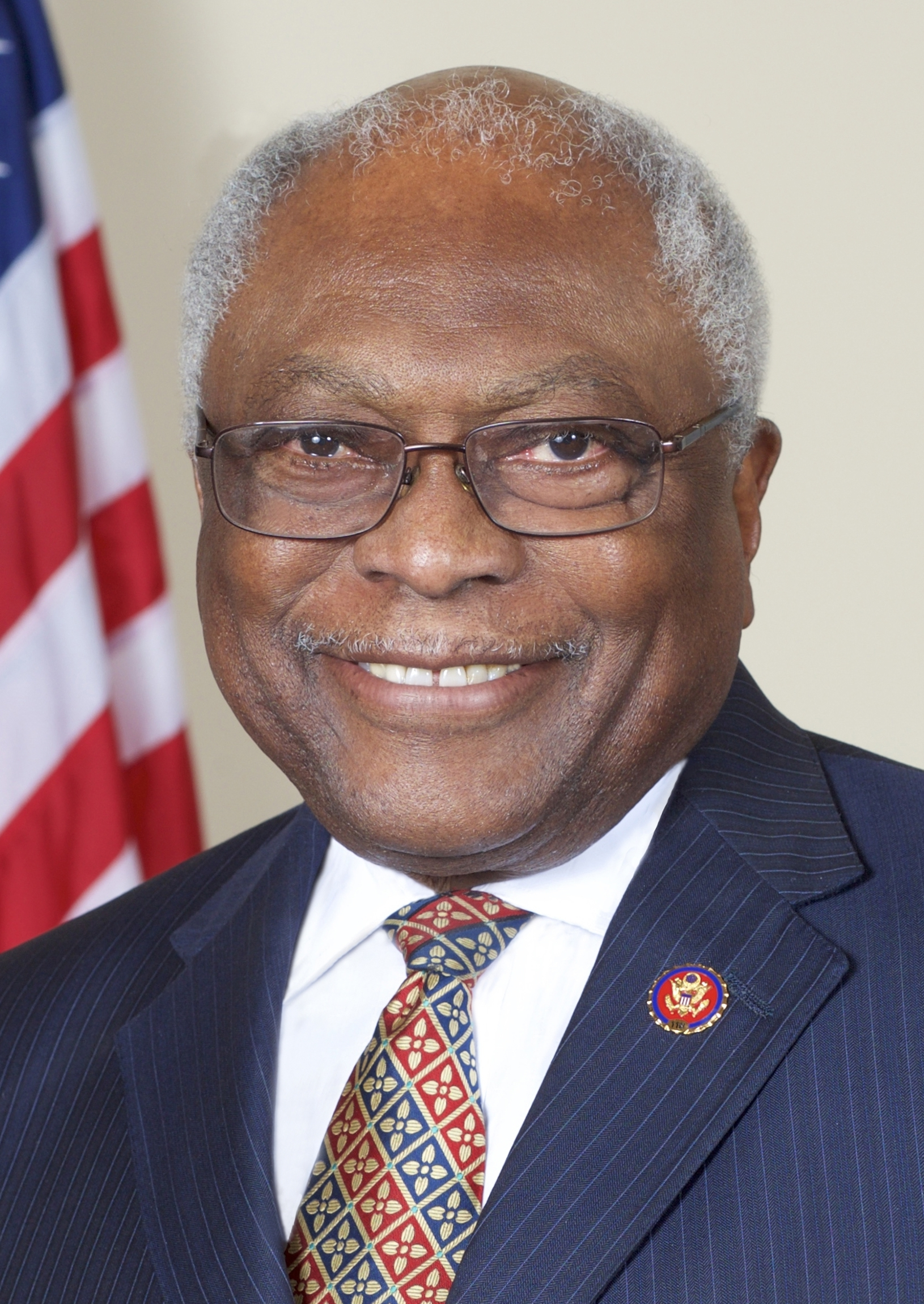

Nominee	Jim Clyburn	John McCollum
Party	Democratic	Republican
Popular vote	197,477	89,258
Percentage	68.2%	30.8%
- Clyburn: 40–50% 50–60% 60–70% 70–80% 80–90% >90% McCollum: 40–50% 50–60% 60–70% 70–80% 80–90% >90% No votes
U.S. Representative before election
Jim Clyburn
Democratic
Elected U.S. Representative
Jim Clyburn
Democratic

The 6th district runs through the Black Belt and takes in Columbia and North Charleston. The incumbent was Democrat Jim Clyburn, who was re-elected with 70.1% of the vote in 2018.

=== Democratic primary ===
==== Candidates ====
===== Nominee =====
- Jim Clyburn, incumbent U.S. representative

=== Republican primary ===
==== Candidates ====
===== Nominee =====
- John McCollum, veteran

=== General election ===
==== Predictions ====
Source	Ranking	As of
The Cook Political Report	Solid D	November 2, 2020
Inside Elections	Solid D	October 28, 2020
Sabato's Crystal Ball	Safe D	November 2, 2020
Daily Kos	Safe D	November 2, 2020
RCP	Safe D	November 2, 2020
DDHQ	Safe D	November 3, 2020
538	Solid D	November 3, 2020
Politico	Solid D	November 2, 2020
Niskanen	Safe D	July 26, 2020

==== Fundraising ====
Campaign finance reports as of December 31, 2020
Candidate (party)	Total receipts	Total disbursements	Cash on hand
Jim Clyburn (D)	$3,447,751	$2,372,934	$1,980,495
John McCollum (R)	$0	$0	$0
Source: Federal Election Commission

==== Results ====
South Carolina's 6th congressional district, 2020
Party	Candidate	Votes	%
Democratic	Jim Clyburn (incumbent)	197,477	68.2
Republican	John McCollum	89,258	30.8
Constitution	Mark Hackett	2,646	0.9
Write-in		272	0.1
Total votes		289,653	100.0
Democratic hold			

By county

County	Jim Clyburn Democratic		John McCollum Republican		Mark Hackett Constitution		Write-in		Margin		Total votes
County	#	%	#	%	#	%	#	%	#	%	Total votes
Allendale	2,778	76.83	812	22.46	24	0.66	2	0.06	1,966	54.37	3,616
Bamberg	4,159	64.18	2,274	35.09	43	0.66	4	0.06	1,885	29.09	6,480
Beaufort (part)	3,370	61.70	2,034	37.24	53	0.97	5	0.09	1,336	24.46	5,462
Berkeley (part)	7,439	60.25	4,762	38.57	132	1.07	14	0.11	2,677	21.68	12,347
Calhoun	4,016	48.52	4,177	50.47	80	0.97	4	0.05	−161	−1.95	8,277
Charleston (part)	31,477	72.48	11,403	26.26	496	1.14	55	0.13	20,074	46.22	43,431
Clarendon	8,465	50.70	8,110	48.57	113	0.68	9	0.05	355	2.13	16,697
Colleton (part)	8,602	47.03	9,435	51.58	243	1.33	11	0.06	−833	−4.55	18,291
Dorchester (part)	4,846	46.93	5,331	51.63	122	1.18	27	0.26	−485	−4.70	10,326
Florence (part)	3,750	58.71	2,578	40.36	58	0.91	1	0.02	1,172	18.35	6,387
Hampton	5,513	59.50	3,676	39.67	73	0.79	4	0.04	1,837	19.83	9,266
Jasper	7,123	49.69	7,059	49.25	146	1.02	6	0.04	64	0.44	14,334
Orangeburg (part)	23,346	72.57	8,611	26.77	184	0.57	30	0.09	14,735	45.80	32,171
Richland (part)	65,124	83.64	11,940	15.33	718	0.92	81	0.10	53,184	68.31	77,863
Sumter (part)	6,925	79.47	1,726	19.81	58	0.67	5	0.06	5,199	59.66	8,714
Williamsburg	10,544	65.94	5,330	33.33	103	0.64	14	0.09	5,214	32.61	15,991
Totals	197,477	68.18	89,258	30.82	2,646	0.91	272	0.09	108,219	37.36	289,653

Counties that flipped from Democratic to Republican

- Calhoun (largest municipality: St. Matthews)
- Colleton (largest municipality: Walterboro)
- Dorchester (largest municipality: North Charleston)

== District 7 ==
2020 South Carolina's 7th congressional district election
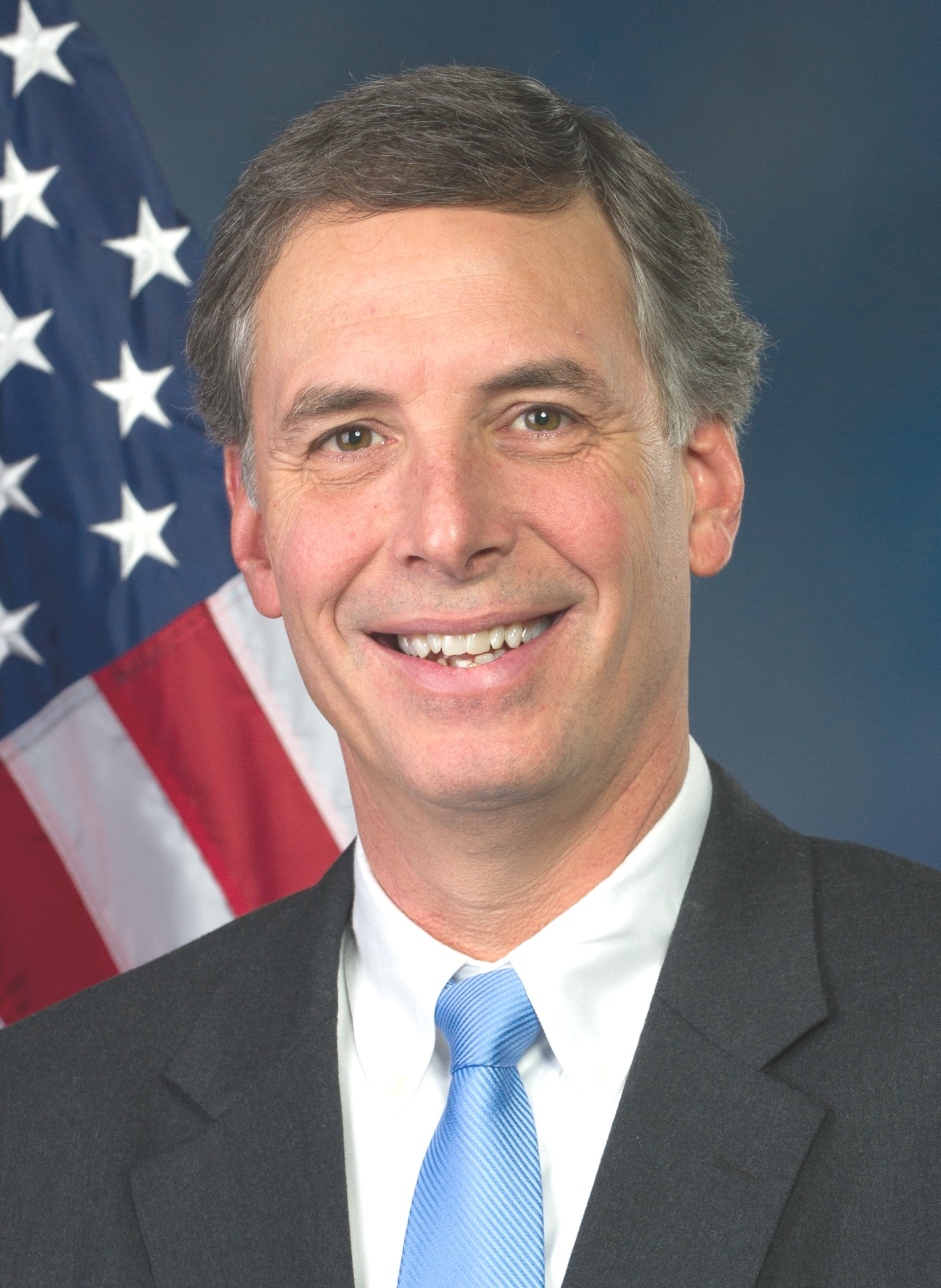

Nominee	Tom Rice	Melissa Watson
Party	Republican	Democratic
Popular vote	224,993	138,863
Percentage	61.8%	38.1%
- County results Rice: 50–60% 60–70% Watson: 50–60%
U.S. Representative before election
Tom Rice
Republican
Elected U.S. Representative
Tom Rice
Republican

The 7th district is located in northeastern South Carolina, taking in Myrtle Beach and Florence. The incumbent was Republican Tom Rice, who was re-elected with 59.6% of the vote in 2018.

=== Republican primary ===
==== Candidates ====
===== Nominee =====
- Tom Rice, incumbent U.S. representative

=== Democratic primary ===
==== Candidates ====
===== Nominee =====
- Melissa Watson, nonprofit executive

===== Eliminated in primary =====
- Robert Williams, state representative and nominee for this district in 2018
- William H. Williams

==== Primary results ====
Democratic primary results
Party	Candidate	Votes	%
Democratic	Melissa Watson	27,200	51.2
Democratic	Robert Williams	21,923	41.3
Democratic	William H. Williams	3,965	7.5
Total votes		53,088	100.0

=== General election ===
==== Predictions ====
Source	Ranking	As of
The Cook Political Report	Solid R	November 2, 2020
Inside Elections	Solid R	October 28, 2020
Sabato's Crystal Ball	Safe R	November 2, 2020
Daily Kos	Safe R	November 2, 2020
RCP	Safe R	November 2, 2020
DDHQ	Safe R	November 3, 2020
538	Solid R	November 3, 2020
Politico	Solid R	November 2, 2020
Niskanen	Safe R	July 26, 2020

==== Fundraising ====
Campaign finance reports as of December 31, 2020
Candidate (party)	Total receipts	Total disbursements	Cash on hand
Tom Rice (R)	$1,415,987	$1,252,457	$1,121,353
Melissa Watson (D)	$150,747	$150,747	$0
Source: Federal Election Commission

==== Results ====
South Carolina's 7th congressional district, 2020
Party	Candidate	Votes	%
Republican	Tom Rice (incumbent)	224,993	61.8
Democratic	Melissa Watson	138,863	38.1
Write-in		235	0.1
Total votes		364,091	100.0
Republican hold			

By county

County	Tom Rice Republican		Melissa Watson Democratic		Write-in		Margin		Total votes
County	#	%	#	%	#	%	#	%	Total votes
Chesterfield	11,456	60.82	7,371	39.13	10	0.05	4,085	21.69	18,837
Darlington	17,502	54.05	14,850	45.86	27	0.08	2,652	8.19	32,379
Dillon	6,710	51.40	6,337	48.54	7	0.05	373	2.86	13,054
Florence (part)	31,732	54.56	26,400	45.39	30	0.05	5,332	9.17	58,162
Georgetown	21,740	59.45	14,812	40.50	19	0.05	6,928	18.95	36,571
Horry	124,568	69.61	54,244	30.31	133	0.07	70,324	39.30	178,945
Marion	6,072	41.32	8,617	58.64	5	0.03	−2,545	−17.32	14,694
Marlboro	5,213	45.53	6,232	54.43	4	0.03	−1,019	−8.90	11,449
Totals	224,993	61.80	138,863	38.14	235	0.06	86,130	23.66	364,091

== See also ==
- 2020 South Carolina elections

== Notes ==
Partisan clients

Footnotes
