= Isadore Lourie =

American politician (1953–2023)

Member of the South Carolina Senate from the 21st district
- In office 1973–1992
- Succeeded by: Darrell Jackson (politician)

Member of the South Carolina House of Representatives from the 77th district
- In office 1965–1973

Personal details
- Born: 1932 St. George, South Carolina
- Died: April 23, 2003 (aged 70) Columbia, South Carolina, U.S.
- Party: Democratic Party
- Spouse: Susan Reiner
- Children: 3, including Joel Lourie
- Education: University of South Carolina University of South Carolina School of Law
- Occupation: Attorney

Isadore Edward Lourie (1932–2003) was an attorney and a Democratic Party member of the South Carolina Senate, representing the 21st District from 1973 until 1992. He was a member of the South Carolina House of Representatives from 1965 through 1973. Lourie served in the South Carolina General Assembly for more than three decades.

== Early life ==
Lourie was born in St. George in Charleston County, South Carolina to Jewish immigrant parents. They founded the Louries department store, which relocated to Columbia with the family and remained open for decades.

== Political career ==
Lourie was responsible for significant legislation, including The Freedom of Information Act, bills launching the Commission on Aging, the Commission for the Blind, establishment of public kindergarten, the homestead exemption tax, the Legislative Audit Council and the South Carolina Permanent Improvement Program, responsible for funding 72 senior centers in South Carolina.

=== 1964 South Carolina House of Representatives campaign ===
Lourie ran and won his seat in the House with the campaign slogan, 'The Man who will stand up for you".

=== 1972 South Carolina Senate campaign ===
Lourie ran and won his seat in the Senate.

=== 1984 South Carolina Senate campaign ===
Lourie considered stepping down for health reasons, but was convinced to stay on for another term.

=== Supporting Black candidates ===
Lourie supported Black candidates, helping I.S. Leevy Johnson and Jim Felder to become the first Black candidates to be elected to the General Assembly since reconstruction. In 1992, when Lourie stepped down from his Senate seat, Senator Darrell Jackson said he did it so that a minority could run for the seat. "He was in the prime of his career, and he voluntarily stepped aside so that someone else could serve and that someone else, luckily, was myself. I owe a big debt of gratitude to Senator Lourie."

== Civic affairs ==
1959, president, Richland County Cancer Society

1960, president, South Carolina Jaycees

1994, founded South Carolina Jewish Historical Society

1995, appointed by Governor David Beasley to the South Carolina Commission on Racial Relations

== Death ==
Lourie died at age 70 after an extended illness.

== Honors and recognitions ==
In 2004, Lourie was posthumously awarded the South Carolina Worker's Compensation Education Association (SCWCEA) Lifetime Service Award

In 2013, the Capital Senior Center was renamed, 'The Lourie Center' to honor this legislative accomplishments on behalf of South Carolina seniors.

After encouragement from Lourie, a public menorah lighting at the South Carolina State House, bearing Isadore Lourie's name, has become an annual event.

In 2015, the Lourie Center began awarding the Senator Isadore E. Lourie Award, for excellence in service to seniors.
