= 2022 South Carolina gubernatorial election =

- November 8, 2022
- Turnout: 50.86% ▼
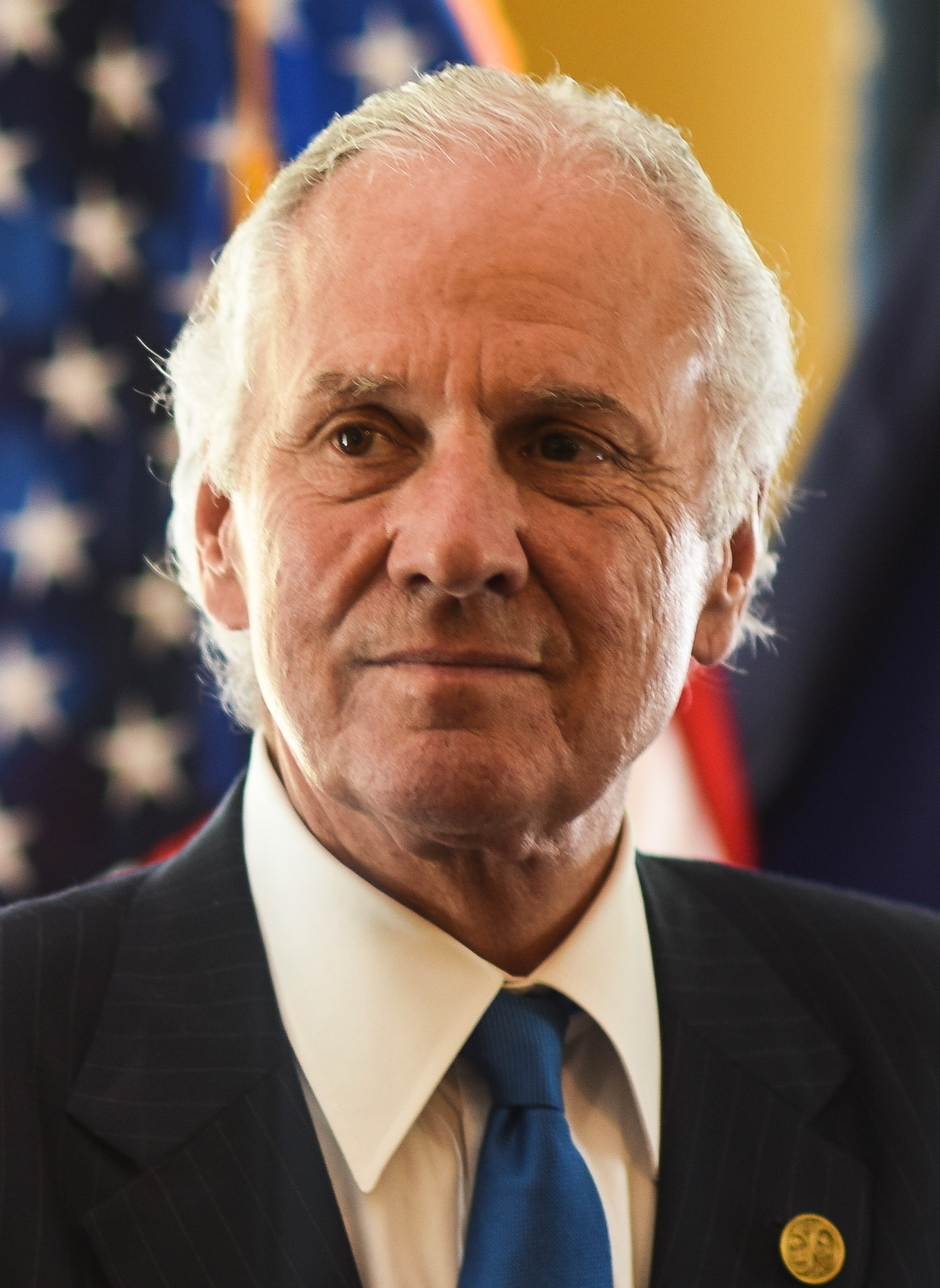

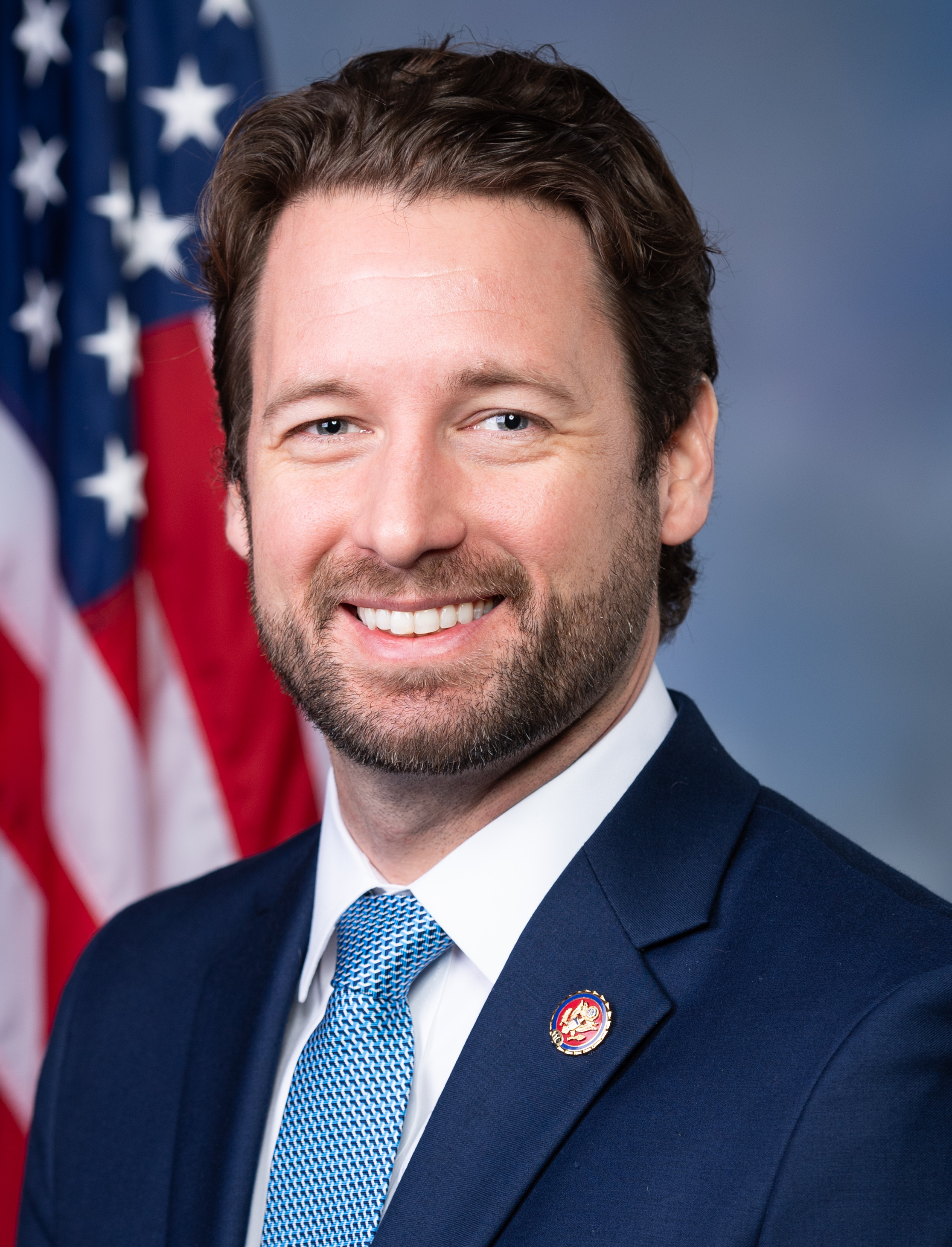
Nominee	Henry McMaster	Joe Cunningham
Party	Republican	Democratic
Running mate	Pamela Evette	Tally Parham Casey
Popular vote	988,501	692,691
Percentage	58.04%	40.67%
- McMaster: 40–50% 50–60% 60–70% 70–80% 80–90% >90% Cunningham: 40–50% 50–60% 60–70% 70–80% 80–90% >90% Tie: 50% No data
Governor before election
Henry McMaster
Republican
Elected Governor
Henry McMaster
Republican

The 2022 South Carolina gubernatorial election took place on November 8, 2022, to elect the governor of South Carolina. Incumbent Republican Governor Henry McMaster ran for re-election for a second full term in office and secured the Republican nomination in the June 14 primary. Joe Cunningham, former United States representative from South Carolina's 1st congressional district, was the Democratic nominee. McMaster won the general election with 58% of the vote — a 4.08% improvement over his 2018 margin.

McMaster became the first Republican gubernatorial candidate to win Calhoun County since 1994, and the first to win Clarendon County and Dillon County since 1990. This election marks the largest gubernatorial victory in the state since 1990, when incumbent Republican Carroll Campbell won his re-election bid by a margin of 41.7%.

== Republican primary ==
=== Candidates ===
==== Declared ====
- Henry McMaster, incumbent governor
  - Running mate: Pamela Evette, incumbent lieutenant governor

==== Eliminated in primary ====
- Harrison "Trucker Bob" Musselwhite, trucker and chairman of Legislate Liaison Committee for the Greenville County Republican Party
  - Running mate: Zoe Warren, filmmaker and editor-at-large for The Standard SC

==== Withdrew ====
- Al Bellavance, former Fort Lawn town councilor
- Mindy L. Steele, political consultant

==== Declined ====
- A. Shane Massey, majority leader of the South Carolina Senate
- Tim Scott, U.S. senator (ran for re-election)
- Katrina Shealy, state senator
- John Warren, Greenville businessman and candidate for governor in 2018

=== Endorsements ===
Henry McMaster

Executive branch officials

- Mike Pompeo, former U.S. Secretary of State (2018–2021), former Director of the CIA (2017–2018), and former U.S. representative from Kansas's 4th congressional district (2011–2017)
- Donald Trump, 45th president of the United States (2017–2021)

U.S. senators

- Tim Scott, U.S. senator from South Carolina (2013–present)

State officials

- Kristi Noem, governor of South Dakota (2019–present)
- Kim Reynolds, governor of Iowa (2017–present)

Party officials

- Drew McKissick, chair of the South Carolina Republican Party (2017–present)

Organizations

- Republican Governors Association (RGA)
- Susan B. Anthony List, national anti-abortion nonprofit and political action group

=== Results ===
Primary results by county: McMaster: 70–80%; 80–90%; 90–100%

South Carolina gubernatorial Republican primary election, 2022
Party	Candidate	Votes	%
Republican	Henry McMaster (incumbent)	306,555	83.0%
Republican	Harrison Musselwhite	61,545	16.7%
Total votes		367,689	100%

== Democratic primary ==
=== Candidates ===
==== Nominee ====
- Joe Cunningham, former U.S. representative for South Carolina's 1st congressional district

==== Eliminated in primary ====
- Carlton Boyd
- Mia McLeod, state senator
- Calvin "CJ Mack" McMillan, singer
- William H. Williams, former postmaster, veteran and candidate for South Carolina's 7th congressional district in 2020

==== Withdrew ====
- Gary Votour, healthcare advocate and retired GIS mapper (running under Labor nomination)

==== Declined ====
- Stephen K. Benjamin, former mayor of Columbia
- Mandy Powers Norrell, former state representative and nominee for lieutenant governor in 2018 (endorsed McLeod)
- Todd Rutherford, minority leader of the South Carolina House of Representatives

=== Endorsements ===
Joe Cunningham

U.S. senators

- Doug Jones, former U.S. senator from Alabama (2018–2021)

State representatives

- Todd Rutherford, minority leader of the South Carolina House of Representatives (2013–present)

Local officials

- Kylon Middleton, Charleston County councilor

Organizations

- 314 Action

Newspapers

- Charleston City Paper
Mia McLeod

State legislators

- Marlon Kimpson, state senator (2013–present)
- Mandy Powers Norrell, former state representative (2012–2020) and nominee for lieutenant governor in 2018

Individuals

- Amanda Bonfiglio Cunningham, ex-wife of Joe Cunningham

=== Results ===
Primary results by county: Cunningham: 30–40%; 40–50%; 50–60%; 60–70%; 70–80%; 80–90%; McLeod: 40–50%; 50–60%; 70–80%

South Carolina gubernatiorial Democratic primary election, 2022
Party	Candidate	Votes	%
Democratic	Joe Cunningham	102,315	56.5%
Democratic	Mia McLeod	56,084	31.0%
Democratic	Carlton Boyd	9,526	5.3%
Democratic	William Williams	6,746	3.7%
Democratic	Calvin McMillan	6,260	3.5%
Total votes		180,931	100%

=== Lieutenant governor selection ===
After winning the primary, on July 18, Cunningham released a shortlist of potential running mates. He announced Tally Parham Casey as his running mate on August 1.

==== Chosen as running mate ====
- Tally Parham Casey, law firm CEO and former South Carolina Air National Guard fighter pilot

==== Made shortlist ====
- Rosalyn Glenn, financial planner and nominee for South Carolina State Treasurer in 2018
- Jermaine Johnson, state representative
- Kimberly Johnson, state representative
- Meghan Smith, Spartanburg city councilor
- Ed Sutton, real estate agent and U.S. Air Force pilot
- Spencer Wetmore, state representative
- Kathryn Whitaker, law firm chief marketing officer

==== Declined ====
- Mia McLeod, state senator and runner-up in the gubernatorial primary
- Teresa Wilson, Columbia city manager

== Independents and third parties ==
=== Candidates ===
==== Declared ====
- Jokie Beckett Jr., veteran (Independence)
- Michael Copeland (Independence)
- Morgan Bruce Reeves (Libertarian), United Citizens and Green nominee for governor in 2010 and United Citizens nominee in 2014
- Gary Votour (Labor), healthcare advocate and retired GIS mapper. (Note: Labor Party candidates' names were kept off the ballot after court ruling.)
  - Running mate: Harold Geddings III, candidate for South Carolina's 2nd congressional district in 2014

== General election ==
=== Predictions ===
Source	Ranking	As of
The Cook Political Report	Solid R	July 26, 2022
Inside Elections	Solid R	July 22, 2022
Sabato's Crystal Ball	Safe R	June 29, 2022
Politico	Solid R	April 1, 2022
RCP	Safe R	June 8, 2022
Fox News	Solid R	May 12, 2022
538	Solid R	July 31, 2022
Elections Daily	Safe R	November 7, 2022

=== Post-primary endorsements ===
Henry McMaster (R)

Local officials

- Daniel Rickenmann, mayor of Columbia (2022–present)

Organizations

- National Federation of Independent Business
- NRA Political Victory Fund
Joe Cunningham (D)

State legislators

- Deon Tedder, state representative (2020–present)

Local officials

- Joseph P. Riley Jr., former mayor of Charleston (1975–2016)

Organizations

- Everytown for Gun Safety
- Planned Parenthood
- South Carolina Education Association

=== Polling ===
Graphical summary

Poll source	Date(s) administered	Sample size (Note: Key: A – all adults RV – registered voters LV – likely voters V – unclear)	Margin of error	Henry McMaster (R)	Joe Cunningham (D)	Other	Undecided
Echelon Insights (R)	August 24 – September 7, 2022	600 (LV)	± 3.7%	50%	44%	6%	0%
Impact Research (D) (Note: This poll was sponsored by Cunningham's campaign.)	August 24–30, 2022	700 (LV)	± 3.7%	49%	42%	4% (Note: Reeves with 4%)	5%
The Trafalgar Group (R)	August 25–28, 2022	1,071 (LV)	± 2.9%	51%	43%	2% (Note: Reeves with 2%)	4%
Blueprint Polling (D)	August 24–25, 2022	721 (LV)	± 3.7%	50%	39%	1%	9%

=== Debates and forums ===
2022 South Carolina gubernatorial debates
No.	Date	Host	Moderator	Link	Republican	Democratic	Libertarian	Labor
Key: P Participant N Non-invitee								
Key: P Participant N Non-invitee					Henry McMaster	Joe Cunningham	Morgan Reeves	Gary Votour
	Oct 26, 2022	South Carolina ETV	Gavin Jackson; Andy Shain		P	P	N	N

=== Results ===
State Senate district results

2022 South Carolina gubernatorial election
Party	Candidate	Votes	%	±%
Republican	Henry McMaster (incumbent); Pamela Evette (incumbent)	988,501	58.04%	+4.08%
Democratic	Joe Cunningham; Tally Parham Casey	692,691	40.67%	−5.25%
Libertarian	Morgan Bruce Reeves; Jessica Ethridge	20,826	1.22%	N/A
Write-in		1,174	0.07%	−0.05%
Total votes		1,703,192	100.00%	N/A
Republican hold				

==== By county ====
McMaster won 34 of 46 counties.

County	Henry McMaster Republican		Joe Cunningham Democratic		Various candidates Other parties		Margin		Total
County	#	%	#	%	#	%	#	%	Total
Abbeville	6,010	69.88%	2,498	29.04%	93	1.08%	3,512	40.83%	8,601
Aiken	35,948	65.53%	18,014	32.84%	898	1.64%	17,934	32.69%	54,860
Allendale	562	30.88%	1,234	67.80%	24	1.32%	-672	-36.92%	1,820
Anderson	46,144	72.76%	16,541	26.08%	734	1.16%	29,603	46.68%	63,419
Bamberg	1,736	43.59%	2,192	55.03%	55	1.38%	-456	-11.45%	3,983
Barnwell	3,643	58.22%	2,543	40.64%	71	1.13%	1,100	17.58%	6,257
Beaufort	41,839	58.35%	29,265	40.81%	602	0.84%	12,574	17.54%	71,706
Berkeley	39,829	55.78%	30,592	42.85%	979	1.37%	9,237	12.94%	71,400
Calhoun	3,238	57.60%	2,301	40.93%	83	1.48%	937	16.67%	5,622
Charleston	66,475	43.31%	85,433	55.66%	1,580	1.03%	-18,958	-12.35%	153,488
Cherokee	12,300	76.20%	3,685	22.83%	157	0.97%	8,615	53.37%	16,142
Chester	5,762	60.13%	3,695	38.56%	126	1.31%	2,067	21.57%	9,583
Chesterfield	7,983	63.57%	4,435	35.32%	139	1.11%	3,548	28.26%	12,557
Clarendon	6,374	55.63%	4,983	43.49%	100	0.87%	1,391	12.14%	11,457
Colleton	7,159	57.07%	5,239	41.76%	147	1.17%	1,920	15.30%	12,545
Darlington	11,535	57.57%	8,334	41.59%	169	0.84%	3,201	15.97%	20,038
Dillon	4,341	54.85%	3,508	44.32%	66	0.83%	833	10.52%	7,915
Dorchester	27,358	54.94%	21,741	43.66%	695	1.40%	5,617	11.28%	49,794
Edgefield	5,907	67.08%	2,790	31.68%	109	1.24%	3,117	35.40%	8,806
Fairfield	3,658	43.48%	4,619	54.90%	136	1.62%	-961	-11.42%	8,413
Florence	22,741	54.88%	18,189	43.89%	509	1.23%	4,552	10.98%	41,439
Georgetown	16,373	59.54%	10,889	39.59%	239	0.87%	5,484	19.94%	27,501
Greenville	108,222	60.75%	66,943	37.58%	2,969	1.67%	41,279	23.17%	178,134
Greenwood	14,196	65.12%	7,330	33.62%	275	1.26%	6,866	31.49%	21,801
Hampton	2,665	47.34%	2,907	51.63%	58	1.03%	-242	-4.30%	5,630
Horry	92,708	69.36%	39,813	29.79%	1,140	0.85%	52,895	39.57%	133,661
Jasper	6,259	56.25%	4,749	42.68%	120	1.08%	1,510	13.57%	11,128
Kershaw	14,024	62.60%	8,072	36.03%	306	1.37%	5,952	26.57%	22,402
Lancaster	22,399	64.83%	11,653	33.73%	499	1.44%	10,746	31.10%	34,551
Laurens	13,766	69.45%	5,771	29.12%	284	1.43%	7,995	40.34%	19,821
Lee	2,116	40.27%	3,082	58.65%	57	1.08%	-966	-18.38%	5,255
Lexington	64,328	64.55%	33,745	33.86%	1,583	1.59%	30,583	30.69%	99,656
Marion	3,846	45.70%	4,484	53.28%	86	1.02%	-638	-7.58%	8,416
Marlboro	3,209	49.09%	3,247	49.67%	81	1.24%	-38	-0.58%	6,537
McCormick	2,757	60.37%	1,759	38.52%	51	1.12%	998	21.85%	4,567
Newberry	8,413	65.55%	4,248	33.10%	174	1.36%	4,165	32.45%	12,835
Oconee	21,622	74.65%	6,988	24.13%	355	1.23%	14,634	50.52%	28,965
Orangeburg	9,501	36.28%	16,481	62.93%	209	0.80%	-6,980	-26.65%	26,191
Pickens	30,020	74.67%	9,546	23.74%	639	1.59%	20,474	50.92%	40,205
Richland	41,008	32.20%	84,541	66.38%	1,819	1.43%	-43,533	-34.18%	127,368
Saluda	4,695	71.57%	1,783	27.18%	82	1.25%	2,912	44.39%	6,560
Spartanburg	63,806	65.74%	31,939	32.91%	1,306	1.35%	31,867	32.84%	97,051
Sumter	14,292	46.59%	16,051	52.32%	334	1.09%	-1,759	-5.73%	30,677
Union	5,722	66.04%	2,859	32.99%	84	0.97%	2,863	33.04%	8,665
Williamsburg	3,858	39.40%	5,839	59.63%	95	0.97%	-1,981	-20.23%	9,792
York	58,154	60.59%	36,141	37.66%	1,683	1.75%	22,013	22.94%	95,978
Totals	988,501	58.04%	692,691	40.67%	22,000	1.29%	295,810	17.37%	1,703,192

Counties that flipped from Democratic to Republican

- Calhoun (largest city: St. Matthews)
- Clarendon (largest city: Manning)
- Dillon (largest city: Dillon)
- Jasper (largest city: Hardeeville)

==== By congressional district ====
McMaster won six of seven congressional districts.

District	McMaster	Cunningham	Representative
1st	55%	44%	Nancy Mace
2nd	56%	42%	Joe Wilson
3rd	71%	28%	Jeff Duncan
4th	61%	37%	William Timmons
5th	62%	37%	Ralph Norman
6th	36%	63%	Jim Clyburn
7th	63%	36%	Tom Rice (117th Congress)
7th	63%	36%	Russell Fry (118th Congress)

== See also ==
- 2022 South Carolina elections

== Notes ==
Partisan clients
