= Overture Walker =

American politician

Member of the South Carolina Senate from the 22nd district
- Incumbent
- Assumed office January 10, 2025
- Preceded by: Mia McLeod

Personal details
- Party: Democratic
- Profession: Attorney

Overture Walker is an American politician serving as a member representing the South Carolina Senate from the 22nd district (Kershaw and Richland Counties).

== Career ==
Walker is an attorney, and has served as a municipal judge and a prosecutor.

== Political career ==
Walker was elected to Richland County Council in 2020, and was elected its chairman in January 2022.

=== 2024 State Senate race ===
In January 2024, South Carolina House member Ivory Torrey Thigpen announced his candidacy for State Senate District 22. Educator Dr. Monica Elkins also announced her intention to run in the Democratic Primary. On April 1, 2024, Independent incumbent Senator Mia McLeod announced that she would not seek re-election, and on April 2, Walker joined Thigpen and Elkins as candidates for the Democratic primary nomination.

Walker defeated Thigpen in the primary runoff to become the Democratic nominee.

According to June 11 press reports, Republican Lee Blatt had withdrawn from the Senate race. On June 20, 2024, South Carolina Workers Party candidate Gary Votour withdrew from the Senate race. Walker entered and won the general election with no opposition.

Walker serves on the Senate Corrections and Penology, Transportation, Judiciary, and Rules Committees.
