= Beth Bernstein =

American politician

Member of the South Carolina House of Representatives from the 78th district
- Incumbent
- Assumed office November 2012
- Preceded by: Joan B. Brady

Personal details
- Born: November 13 Columbia, South Carolina
- Party: Democratic
- Spouse: Knowlton "Rip" Sanders
- Children: Caroline Sanders and Isabel Sanders
- Education: University of Georgia; University of South Carolina School of Law
- Profession: Attorney
- Website: Campaign website

Beth Bernstein is a Democratic member of the South Carolina House of Representatives, representing House District 78. She was first elected in November 2012.

== Early life and education ==
Bernstein was born on November 13, 1969, in Columbia, South Carolina, the daughter of Carol and Isadore Bernstein, both of whom are deceased. Bernstein attended the University of Georgia graduating with a Bachelor of Arts degree in 1991. She later earned a law degree from the University of South Carolina School of Law in 1994. Bernstein is licensed to practice in South Carolina state courts, United States District Court for South Carolina, United States Court of Appeals for the Fourth Circuit, and the United States Supreme Court. She practices law at the law firm her father founded in 1943, Bernstein and Bernstein, Attorneys at Law, with her brother, Lowell Bernstein, and husband, Knowlton "Rip" Sanders.

== South Carolina House of Representatives ==
In 2012, Bernstein successfully ran for the South Carolina House of Representatives House District 78. Currently, she serves on the House Judiciary Committee, and was elected by the legislative body to serve as one of ten members on the House Ethics Committee and currently serves as its Secretary. She also was appointed by the Speaker of the House to serve on the Joint Legislative and Citizens Committee on Children where she has previously served as its Chair. She also serves as Chairwoman of the SC General Assembly Women's Caucus. Bernstein serves as Vice Chair of Richland County Legislative Delegation.

She has received the following awards during her legislative service: Conservation Voters of South Carolina Green Tie Award, Girl Scouts of South Carolina – Mountains to Midlands’ Women of Distinction; Child Advocate Award from the SC Chapter of the American Academy of Pediatrics; SmokeFreeSC Legislator of the Year; Barbara Moxon Advocacy Award for championing women’s issues; Legacy of Caring award from USC College of Nursing; Sierra Club of South Carolina Legislator of the Year; John W. Williams, Jr. Distinguished Service Award from the Richland County Bar Association; SC Coalition for Healthy Families Legislative Champion.

Bernstein is a graduate of Aspen Institute - Rodel Fellowships in Public Leadership Class of 2019; The Riley Institute at Furman DLI Lowcountry Class XIV; 2017 Center for the Advancement of Leadership Skills (CALS) program sponsored by the Southern Legislative Conference and Council of State Governments; and Aspen Institute - Liberty Fellowship Class of 2015.

Bernstein received Southeast Small Business Magazine’s 2014 Top Women of Influence; Business Monthly’s Top 50 Most Influential People in 2012; and The State’s Top “20 under 40” in 2006.

Bernstein currently serves on Board of Trustees of Hammond School and is a sustaining member of the Junior League of Columbia. She is Past President of the Richland County Bar Association.

== Personal life ==
Bernstein is the fifth of a family of six children. She has an identical twin sister, Anne Bernstein, who is a physician in Florida. Bernstein is married to Knowlton "Rip" Sanders. They have two daughters, Caroline, 20, and Isabel, 15. She attends Beth Shalom Synagogue in Columbia, SC.
