= Darrell Jackson (politician) =

American politician (born 1957)

Member of the South Carolina Senate from the 21st district
- Incumbent
- Assumed office 1992
- Preceded by: Isadore Lourie

Personal details
- Born: February 1, 1957 (age 69) Columbia, South Carolina
- Party: Democratic
- Spouse: Willie Mae
- Children: 2
- Education: Benedict College (BA); Columbia International University (MA)
- Profession: Businessman, minister, pastor, politician

Darrell Jackson (born February 1, 1957) is a Democratic member of the South Carolina Senate, representing the 21st District since 1993.

== Education ==
Jackson graduated from Benedict College in 1979. While there, he was the President of the Student Government Association. He also attended USC School of Law and the Columbia Bible College and Seminary, receiving an M.A. from Columbia International University.

== Political career ==
=== S.C. Senate ===
==== Elections ====
Jackson was first elected to represent the 21st District in the South Carolina Senate in 1992.

===== 2016 Election =====
In 2016, Jackson was reelected as District 21 Senator for the State of South Carolina after fending-off Democratic primary challenger, Wendy Brawley.

===== 2020 Election =====
In 2020, Jackson won an uncontested race for his seat.

===== 2024 Election =====
In 2024, Jackson again ran in an uncontested election.

==== Tenure ====
In 2020, Jackson introduced legislation to make Juneteenth a statewide holiday.

== Personal life ==
Jackson is married to Willie Mae Rooks, and they have two children and three grandchildren. In 1996, Jackson became Senior Pastor of the Bible Way Church, a church started by his father, Bishop Andrew Jackson.

South Carolina Senate
Preceded by Isadore Lourie	Member of the South Carolina Senate from the 21st district 1993–present	Incumbent
