= Joan B. Brady =

American politician

Member of the South Carolina House of Representatives from the 78th district
- In office November 2004 – November 2012
- Preceded by: Joel Lourie
- Succeeded by: Beth Bernstein

Personal details
- Born: May 13 Columbia, South Carolina
- Party: Democratic
- Education: University of South Carolina

Joan B. Brady is an American politician. She was a Republican member of the South Carolina House of Representatives, who is representing House District 78, Richland County, Columbia, SC.

== Early life and education ==
Brady has a degree in journalism from the University of South Carolina. She worked at WCOS-FM radio while earning her degree.

== Political career ==
Brady served as Mayor of Arcadia Lakes in Richland County from 1997 to 2000. She served on Richland County Council from 2000 to 2004.

=== South Carolina House of Representatives ===
Brady won the District 78 seat to the South Carolina House in 2004. Her service in that role included:

- Council of State Government Toll Fellowship, 2005
- South Carolina House Arts Caucus
- Greater Columbia Chamber of Commerce Northeast Council, past Board
- South Carolina New Statesman Society, 2005
- Women In Government, State Director, 2006–10, Executive Board, 2010
- South Carolina Republican Women's Legislative Caucus, 2005, chair, 2007–08
- National Foundation of Women Legislators, State Director, 2008, Recording Secretary, 2009
- Southeastern Institute for Women in Politics, Advisory Board
- House Rules Committee, 2007
- Committee to Screen Candidates for Boards of Trustees of State Colleges and Universities, 2007, Vice Chairman, 2009
- Education and Economics Development Coordinating Council
- South Carolina General Assembly Women's Caucus, chairman, 2008–10
- House Agriculture, Natural Resources and Environmental Affairs, 2005–07
- Labor, Commerce and Industry Committee
- Insurance Subcommittee Chairman
- Joint Legislative and Citizens Commission on Children, Vice Chairman, 2008
- ALEC Telecommunications Task Force, 2009
- House Ethics Committee
- Majority Whip

=== 2012 South Carolina Election ===
In 2012, Brady lost the general election race to Democratic challenger Beth Bernstein.
