= Joel Lourie =

American politician

Member of the South Carolina Senate from the 22nd district
- In office 2004–2017
- Preceded by: Warren Giese
- Succeeded by: Mia S. McLeod

Member of the South Carolina House of Representatives from the 78th district
- In office 1998–2004
- Preceded by: Joe McMaster
- Succeeded by: Joan B. Brady

Personal details
- Born: September 24, 1962 (age 63) Columbia, South Carolina, U.S.
- Party: Democratic
- Spouse: Rebecca Baum
- Profession: President & CEO, Lourie Life & Health

Joel Lourie (born September 24, 1962) is a former Democratic member of the South Carolina Senate, representing the 22nd District from 2004 until 2017. He was previously a member of the South Carolina House of Representatives from 1998 through 2004.

== Biography ==
Joel Lourie was born and raised in Columbia, South Carolina. He is a 1980 graduate of Richland Northeast High School and a 1984 graduate of the University of South Carolina. His parents are the late Senator Isadore Lourie and Susan (Reiner) Lourie. He is married to Rebecca Baum, and has 2 children, Rachel and Sam. Lourie is Jewish.

In 2021, Lourie and former Democratic Senator Vincent Sheheen started a new podcast on South Carolina politics, Bourbon in the Backroom.

== Awards ==
- 2009 Champion of Health Care Award
- 2007 Star of Justice Award - Protection and Advocacy for People with Disabilities, Inc.
- 2006 Humane Society State Legislator Award
- 2006 Seat Belt Champion Award from the Meharry-State Farm Alliance
- 2006 State Safety Leadership Award from the National Transportation Safety Board
- 2004 Legislative Award from the South Carolina Counseling Association
- 2004 Advocate Award from the South Carolina School Improvement Council
- 2002 Advocate Award from the National Alliance for the Mentally Ill
- 2004 and 2006 Legislative Appreciation Awards from South Carolina Victims Assistance Network
- 2003 Legislator of the Year Award for the National Association of Social Workers
- 2000 Alliance for South Carolina's Child Advocacy Leadership Award
- 2000 Senior Advocacy Award from Senior Resources
- 2000 South Carolina Department of Health and Environmental Control Legislator of the Year Award
- 2000 Distinguished Service Award from the South Carolina Association of Non-Profit Organizations
- 2010 Commitment Award from the National Safety Council Alive At 25 Program
- 2011 Legislator of the Year from the South Carolina Recreation and Parks Association
- 2011 Recognition Award from the March of Dimes
