= Joe Cunningham (American politician) =

American politician (born 1982)

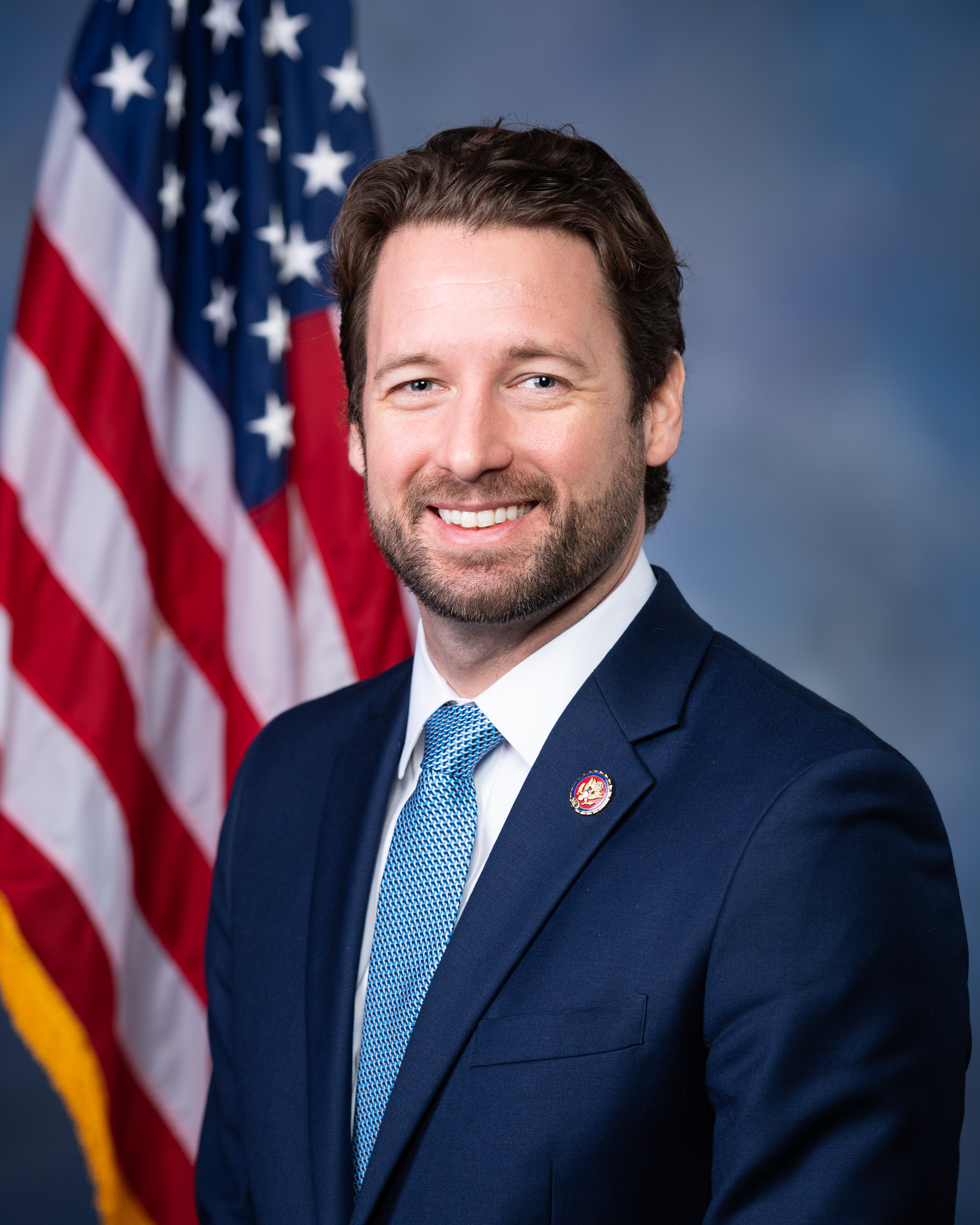
- Official portrait, 2019

Member of the U.S. House of Representatives from South Carolina's 1st district
- In office January 3, 2019 – January 3, 2021
- Preceded by: Mark Sanford
- Succeeded by: Nancy Mace

Personal details
- Born: Joseph Kendrick Cunningham; May 26, 1982 (age 44) Caldwell County, Kentucky, U.S.
- Party: Democratic
- Spouse(s): Amanda Bonfiglio (m. 2014; div. 2022) Ashley Bailey (m. 2023)
- Children: 2
- Relatives: Bill Cunningham (father)
- Education: College of Charleston; Florida Atlantic University (BS); Northern Kentucky University (JD)
- Cunningham's voice Cunningham supporting the Great American Outdoors Act. Recorded July 22, 2020

Joseph Kendrick Cunningham (born May 26, 1982) is an American lawyer and politician who was the U.S. representative for South Carolina's 1st congressional district from 2019 to 2021.

A member of the Democratic Party, Cunningham narrowly defeated Republican state representative Katie Arrington in the 2018 general election for South Carolina's 1st congressional district. After one term in Congress, he lost his 2020 re-election bid in another narrow race to Republican state representative Nancy Mace. He was then the Democratic nominee in the 2022 South Carolina gubernatorial election, losing to incumbent Republican governor Henry McMaster.

== Early life, education and career ==
Cunningham was born in Caldwell County, Kentucky, and grew up in Kuttawa, Kentucky. He graduated from Lyon County High School in 2000. Cunningham attended the College of Charleston for two years before transferring to Florida Atlantic University in 2002, where he obtained his Bachelor of Science in ocean engineering in 2005.

After five years as an ocean engineer with a consulting company in Naples, Florida, Cunningham spent some time learning Spanish in South America, then enrolled in law school at Northern Kentucky University's Salmon P. Chase College of Law in 2011 and graduated in 2014. He then worked as a construction attorney for Charleston firm Lyles & Lyles and co-owned a yoga studio with his wife before campaigning for political office.

== U.S. House of Representatives ==
=== Elections ===
==== 2018 ====
In July 2017, Cunningham announced his candidacy for the United States House of Representatives in South Carolina's 1st congressional district. Cunningham won the nomination with 71.5% of the vote.

Cunningham expected to face Republican incumbent Mark Sanford. However, Sanford was defeated in the Republican primary by state Representative Katie Arrington. Cunningham defeated Arrington with 50.7% of the vote, marking the first time since 1986 that South Carolina Democrats had flipped a U.S. House seat. His victory was widely considered a major upset.

While Arrington carried four of the district's five counties, Cunningham prevailed by winning Charleston County by almost 17,000 votes–more than four times the overall margin of 4,000 votes. Cunningham became the first Democrat to represent the Charleston-based district since 1981. He was also the first white Democrat to win a House seat in the Deep South since John Barrow won reelection in 2012.

==== 2020 ====
In 2020, Cunningham narrowly lost his seat to Republican state Representative Nancy Mace. Once a solidly Republican district, the 1st district had become competitive in recent elections due to the realignment of Charleston's suburban population to the Democratic Party. However, increased turnout in the heavily conservative Beaufort area undermined this trend, allowing Mace to overcome Cunningham's margin in Charleston County.

=== Tenure ===
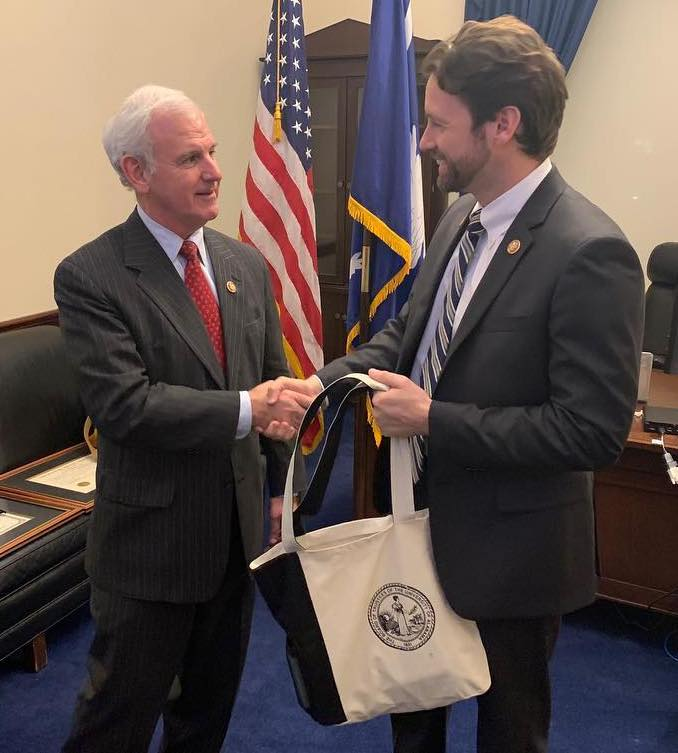
Joe Cunningham (right) with Alabama Representative Bradley Byrne.

In his first vote as a U.S. Representative, Cunningham declined to back Nancy Pelosi for Speaker of the House. Cunningham instead voted for Rep. Cheri Bustos of Illinois.

Cunningham was a member of the Blue Dog Coalition, a group of Democrats who present themselves as moderate to conservative.

On March 8, 2019, while National Oceanic and Atmospheric Administration assistant administrator for fisheries Chris Oliver was testifying at a Natural Resources Water, Oceans and Wildlife Subcommittee hearing on the effects of seismic testing on right whales, Cunningham blasted an air horn to demonstrate how disruptive commercial air guns were to whales. Cunningham said that the sound of commercial air guns was up to 16,000 times louder than an air horn.

Cunningham stopped short of endorsing an impeachment inquiry against President Trump after the Ukraine allegations emerged, claiming that a partisan rush to impeach the President would be bad for the country, but that if the allegations against Trump were true, they "represent a clear threat to the Constitution, our national security and the democratic process". On October 31, 2019, however, Cunningham voted in favor of a resolution to lay out rules to proceed with an impeachment inquiry of President Trump. On December 16, Cunningham announced that he would support both articles of impeachment pending in the House of Representatives, saying "At the end of day, this is simply about the rule of law, whether we're a country with laws or not and what type of precedent we want to set for future presidents." On December 18, 2019, Cunningham voted for both articles of impeachment against Trump.

Two bills introduced by Cunningham were ultimately signed into law: The Great American Outdoors Act (August 2020), a bipartisan conservation bill that permanently and fully funds the Land and Water Conservation Fund and addresses deferred maintenance needs in national parks and other public lands, and the VA Telehearing Modernization Act (April 2020), which enables veterans to participate remotely in appeals hearings before the Board of Veterans' Appeals.

=== Farewell speech ===
In his farewell speech to the House of Representatives in December 2020, Cunningham toasted a can of beer to "the spirit of bipartisanship and cooperation", saying that "for the betterment of this country, we have to come together, we have to sit down and listen to each other, and maybe even have a beer." GovTrack reports that during his two years in the U.S. House, Cunningham joined bipartisan bills the second most often and had the fifth least left-leaning voting record compared to other house Democrats.

=== Committee assignments ===
- Committee on Natural Resources
  - Subcommittee on Energy and Mineral Resources
  - Subcommittee on Water, Oceans and Wildlife
- Committee on Veterans' Affairs
  - Subcommittee on Economic Opportunity
  - Subcommittee on Technology Modernization

=== Caucus memberships ===
- Blue Dog Coalition
- Future Forum Caucus
- New Democrat Coalition
- Problem Solvers Caucus

== Post-congressional career ==
=== 2022 gubernatorial campaign ===
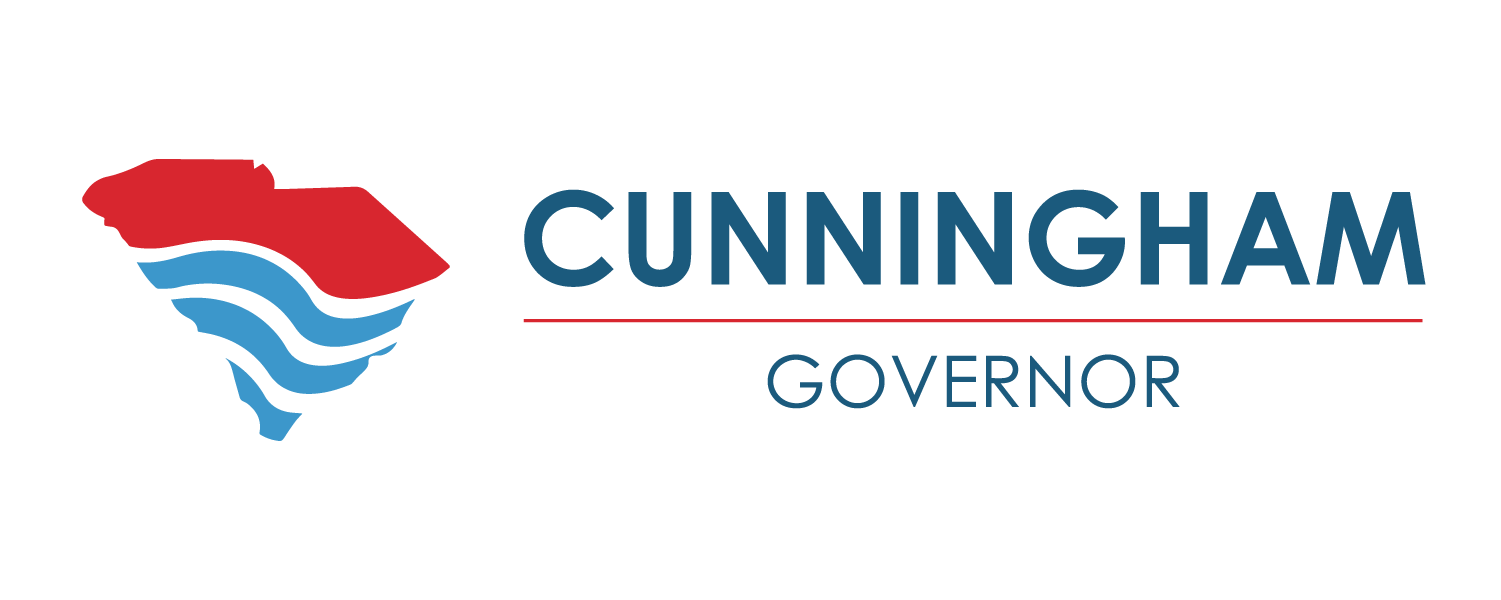
Cunningham's gubernatorial campaign logo

Cunningham was the Democratic nominee for South Carolina governor, winning the June 14 primary with 57% of the vote. Cunningham was defeated by incumbent Republican governor Henry McMaster in the November election, 58% to 41%.

=== Political consulting and No Labels ===
On March 16, 2023, Cunningham announced the launch of Cunningham Consulting, a consulting firm specializing in public affairs, government relations and advocacy. In May 2023, Cunningham penned an op-ed for The Post and Courier in which he expressed support for the centrist political organization No Labels and their efforts to run a "unity ticket" in the 2024 U.S. presidential election; at the end of the piece, it's noted that Cunningham has joined No Labels and serves as the group's national director. No Labels ended their campaign in April 2024 due to a lack of suitable candidates. He opted to endorse Democratic President Joe Biden.

== Publications ==
In 2026, Cunningham released Life of the Party: How the Democratic Party lost the Public's Trust, and How they can win it Back. The book debuted in the #1 position on Amazon.

== Political positions ==
Cunningham supports the Affordable Care Act (Obamacare). He accepts the scientific consensus on climate change. Cunningham also opposes offshore drilling, which garnered him the endorsement of coastal mayors and is attributed for his upset victory, and sponsored bills to ban offshore drilling while serving in Congress. He does not support defunding the police.

Cunningham would have supported legalizing marijuana and sports betting if he had been elected governor of South Carolina. His gubernatorial campaign also promised to eliminate South Carolina's state income tax.

== Personal life ==
Cunningham lives in Charleston, South Carolina, with his two sons. His father, Bill Cunningham, is a former Kentucky Supreme Court Justice and author of historical fiction.

In 2021, Cunningham announced his separation from his wife Amanda, and has since divorced and remarried.

== Electoral history ==
2018 South Carolina's 1st congressional district Democratic primary election
| Party | Candidate | Votes | % |
|---|---|---|---|
| Democratic | Joe Cunningham | 23,443 | 71.5 |
| Democratic | Toby Smith | 9,342 | 28.5 |
| Total votes | | 32,785 | 100.0 |

2018 South Carolina's 1st congressional district general election
| Party | Candidate | Votes | % |
|---|---|---|---|
| Democratic | Joe Cunningham | 145,455 | 50.6 |
| Republican | Katie Arrington | 141,473 | 49.2 |
| Write-in | | 505 | 0.2 |
| Total votes | | 287,433 | 100.0 |
| Democratic gain from Republican | | | |

2020 South Carolina's 1st congressional district general election
| Party | Candidate | Votes | % |
|---|---|---|---|
| Republican | Nancy Mace | 216,042 | 50.6 |
| Democratic | Joe Cunningham (incumbent) | 210,627 | 49.3 |
| Write-in | | 442 | 0.1 |
| Total votes | | 427,111 | 100.0 |
| Republican gain from Democratic | | | |

2022 South Carolina gubernatorial Democratic primary election
| Party | Candidate | Votes | % |
|---|---|---|---|
| Democratic | Joe Cunningham | 102,315 | 56.5 |
| Democratic | Mia McLeod | 56,084 | 31.0 |
| Democratic | Carlton Boyd | 9,526 | 5.3 |
| Democratic | William Williams | 6,746 | 3.7 |
| Democratic | Calvin McMillan | 6,260 | 3.5 |
| Total votes | | 180,931 | 100.0 |

South Carolina Gubernatorial Election, 2022
| Party | Candidate | Votes | % |
|---|---|---|---|
| Republican | Henry McMaster (incumbent) | 988,501 | 58.04 |
| Democratic | Joe Cunningham | 692,691 | 40.67 |
| Libertarian | Bruce Reeves | 20,826 | 1.22 |
| Total votes | | 1,703,192 | 100.0 |

== In Transatlantic Dialogue ==
Democrat Congressman Joe Cunningham, (D-SC, 2019-2021) via zoom link (not being able to arrive in person die to the flights cancellations in Florida), together with the Republican Congressman John Thomas "Tom" Graves Jr., (R-GA, 2010-2020) took part in the discussion forum "A New Chapter for EU-US Relations? Perspectives after the Midterm Elections" in Düsseldorf City Hall on 16. November 2026. Welcoming speech to the USA politicians was extended by Dr. Stephan Keller, Lord Mayor of the City of Düsseldorf. The discussion was moderated by Dr. Cornelius Adelbahr, Speakers-Pool Team EUROPE DIRECT of the European Commission. On the photo: Democrat Congressman Joe Cunningham (via zoom link above) and Republican Congressman John Thomas "Tom" Graves Jr. participating in the Q&A session of the discussion. Monday, November 16, 2026. Düsseldorf City Hall, Plenarsaal. Düsseldorf City, Nordrhein Westfalen, FRG.

U.S. House of Representatives
| Preceded by Mark Sanford | Member of the U.S. House of Representatives from South Carolina's 1st congressional district 2019–2021 | Succeeded by Nancy Mace |
Party political offices
| Preceded by James E. Smith Jr. | Democratic nominee for Governor of South Carolina; 2022 | Succeeded by Jermaine Johnson |
U.S. order of precedence (ceremonial)
| Preceded by John Light Napier as Former U.S. Representative | Order of precedence of the United States as Former U.S. Representative | Succeeded by Charles Douglas III as Former U.S. Representative |
