= Ivory Torrey Thigpen =

American politician (born 1978)

Ivory Thigpen

Member of the South Carolina House of Representatives from the 79th district
- In office November 14, 2016 – December 4, 2024
- Preceded by: Mia McLeod
- Succeeded by: Hamilton R. Grant

Personal details
- Born: Ivory Torrey Thigpen; May 11, 1978 (age 48) Jackson, Mississippi, U.S.
- Party: Democratic
- Education: Jackson State University (BS); Palmer College of Chiropractic (DC); Morehouse School of Religion (MDiv)

Ivory Torrey Thigpen Jr. is an American former politician. He is a member of the Democratic party.

== Early life and career ==
Thigpen was born and educated in Mississippi, a graduate of Jackson State University. He is Pastor of Rehoboth Baptist Church in Columbia. Thigpen and his wife are co-owners of a chiropractic office.

== Political career ==
=== South Carolina House of Representatives ===
Thigpen was a member of the South Carolina House of Representatives from the 79th District, serving from 2016 to 2024. He served on the House Judiciary and Rules committee.

In 2023, Thigpen chaired the South Carolina Legislative Black Caucus.

Thigpen attended the 2024 Democratic National Convention as a Party and Elected Leader delegate.

=== 2024 State Senate race ===
In January 2024, Thigpen announced his candidacy for State Senate District 22, the seat currently held by incumbent Mia McLeod. Educator Dr. Monica Elkins also announced a run in the Democratic Primary.

In February 2024, businessman Hamilton R. Grant announced plans to run for House District 79, the seat currently held by Thigpen. Grant and community advocate Jonneika Farr faced each other in the Democratic Primary. Grant defeated Farr to become the Democratic nominee, and defeated Republican Rebecca Madsen in the General Election.

On April 1, 2024, McLeod announced that she would not seek re-election. Richland County Council member Overture Walker joined Thigpen and Elkins as candidates for the Democratic Primary nomination. Lee Blatt filed to run as a Republican candidate for the seat.

On June 11, Thigpen and Walker were the top vote getters in the Democratic Primary, and faced each other in a runoff. Lee Blatt withdrew, and Gary Votour with the South Carolina Workers Party faced the winner of the Democratic Primary in the general election.

On June 25, Thigpen was defeated by Walker in the Primary runoff. Walker went on to win the seat in November 2024.

=== Electoral history ===
District 79
Year	Candidate	Votes	Pct	Candidate	Votes	Pct	Candidate	Votes	Pct
2016 Democratic Primary	Ivory Torrey Thigpen	2,105	46.74%	Monica Elkins	2,074	46.05%	Vannie Williams, Jr.	325	7.22%
2016 Democratic Primary Runoff	Ivory Torrey Thigpen	1,275	63.88%	Monica Elkins	721	36.12%			
2016 General Election	Ivory Torrey Thigpen	13,366	73.03%	Donald Miles	4,581	25.03%	Victor Kocher	354	1.93%
2018 Democratic Primary	Ivory Torrey Thigpen (i)	Winner							
2018 General Election	Ivory Torrey Thigpen (i)	13,307	87.8%	Victor Kocher	1,782	11.8%	Others/Write-in	63	0.4%
