= Mia McLeod =

Former American politician

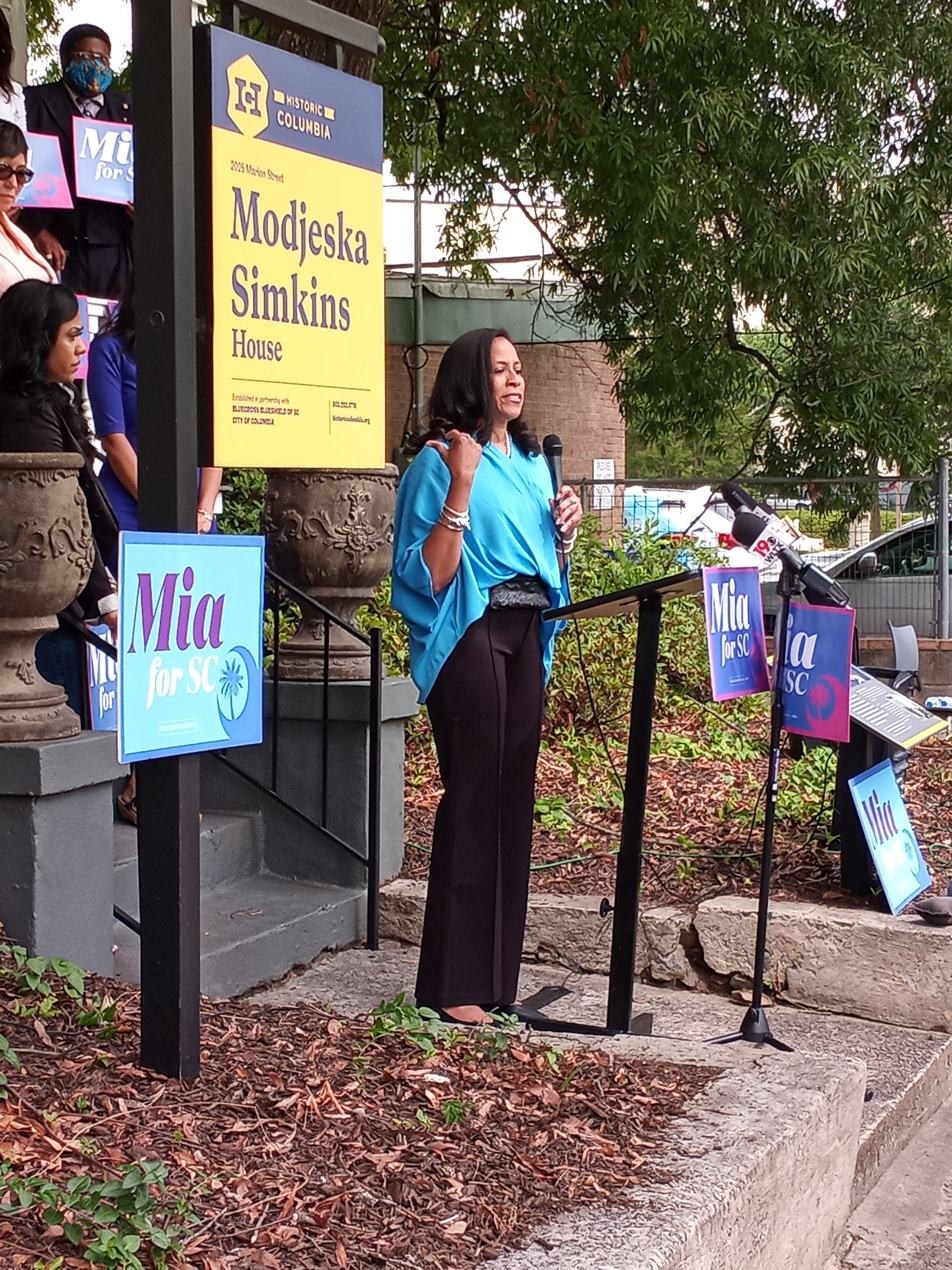
- McLeod's gubernatorial campaign kickoff, 2021

Member of the South Carolina Senate from the 22nd district
- In office January 10, 2017 – December 4, 2024
- Preceded by: Joel Lourie
- Succeeded by: Overture Walker

Member of the South Carolina House of Representatives from the 79th district
- In office January 11, 2011 – January 10, 2017
- Preceded by: Anton Gunn
- Succeeded by: Ivory Torrey Thigpen

Personal details
- Born: August 19, 1968 (age 58) Bennettsville, South Carolina, U.S.
- Party: Democratic (before 2023); Independent (2023–present)
- Education: University of South Carolina (BA, JD)

Mia S. McLeod (born August 19, 1968) is an American former politician who served as a member of the South Carolina Senate from the 22nd district (Kershaw and Richland Counties) from 2017 until 2024. She was a Democrat before later becoming an independent. On June 3, 2021, McLeod announced her candidacy for the 2022 South Carolina gubernatorial election, becoming the first Black woman to run for Governor of South Carolina.

== Early life and education ==
McLeod is the daughter of the late James S. and Shirley J. McLeod. McLeod earned a Bachelor of Arts degree from the University of South Carolina and a Juris Doctor from the University of South Carolina School of Law.

== Career ==
McLeod is the President of McLeod Butler Communications, LLC. Prior to her election to the South Carolina State Legislature, McLeod worked in various state agencies including the Office of the South Carolina Attorney General.

== Political career ==
=== Tenure ===
S.C. Senate

McLeod is a member of the South Carolina Senate, representing the 22nd district since 2017. McLeod serves on the Senate Corrections and Penology; Judiciary; Medical Affairs, Rules and Transportation Committees. In April 2024, she announced she would not be seeking another term. During her political career, McLeod has criticized what she describes as the "old guard" of South Carolina politics.

==== S.C. House of Representatives ====
McLeod served in the South Carolina House of Representatives from 2011 to 2016.

=== Policy positions ===
==== Legislative action on abortion rights ====
In response to restrictions on abortion rights in South Carolina, McLeod sponsored a bill (H. 4544) in December 2015 that would impose similar restrictions for access to Viagra and similar drugs that treat erectile dysfunction.

In 2023, McLeod joined with a Democrat and three Republican women state senators, calling themselves, "The Sister Senators": Sen. McLeod, Sen. Katrina Shealy (R-Lexington), Sen. Penry Gustafson (R-Kershaw), Sen. Margie Bright-Matthews (D-Colleton), and Sen. Sandy Senn (R-Charleston). They blocked the senate from passing a bill that would ban all abortions in South Carolina. McLeod favored a codification of Roe v. Wade, which had been overturned by the U.S. Supreme Court in the 2022 Dobbs decision.

In 2024, McLeod introduced the South Carolina Pro-Birth Accountability Act, which would provide additional support from the State for prenatal, intrapartal, and postpartal care.

=== Endorsements ===
McLeod endorsed Hillary Rodham Clinton for president in 2016.

== Elections ==
=== 2022 Governor's race ===
See 2022 South Carolina gubernatorial election; 2022 United States gubernatorial elections

In 2021, McLeod announced her candidacy for Governor of South Carolina. She was defeated in the Democratic primary by former United States Representative Joe Cunningham.

South Carolina gubernatiorial Democratic primary election, 2022
Party	Candidate	Votes	%
Democratic	Joe Cunningham	102,315	57
Democratic	Mia McLeod	56,084	31
Democratic	Carlton Boyd	9,526	5
Democratic	William Williams	6,746	4
Democratic	Calvin McMillan	6,260	3
Total votes		180,931	100

==== Becoming an independent ====
On January 10, 2023, McLeod announced her decision to leave the Democratic Party and become an independent.

==== 2024 election ====
In January 2024, South Carolina House member Ivory Torrey Thigpen announced his candidacy for State Senate District 22. Educator Dr. Monica Elkins also announced her intention to run in the Democratic Primary.

On April 1, 2024, McLeod announced that she would not seek re-election. Richland County Council member Overture Walker joined Thigpen and Elkins as candidates for the Democratic Primary nomination. Lee Blatt filed to run as a Republican candidate for the seat.

== Personal life ==
During her run for the South Carolina House of Representatives, McLeod was known as Mia Butler, and later as Mia Butler Garrick or Mia Garrick. In 2012 she resumed use of her maiden name, Mia McLeod. McLeod has two sons, Brian and Cameron.

== Honors and recognition ==
In 2021, McLeod gave the Democratic response to the State of the State address.

In September 2023 it was announced that "The Sister Senators" had been selected to receive the John F. Kennedy Profiles in Courage Award. The award was presented in an October 2023 ceremony at the John F. Kennedy Presidential Library. McLeod was recognized with a State Senate resolution after receiving the award.

== Media portrayals ==
A documentary entitled “Sister Senators,” a Lynnwood Pictures and Global Neighborhood project, is now in production. Producers are Emily Harrold and Robin Hessman, co-producer is Rachel Denny. The film is executive produced by Ruth Ann Harnisch and co-executive produced by Ann Lovell. It has been presented at Ji.hlava International Documentary Film Festival.

South Carolina House of Representatives
Preceded by Anton Gunn	Member of the South Carolina House of Representatives from the 79th district 2011–2017	Succeeded by Ivory Torrey Thigpen
South Carolina Senate
Preceded by Joel Lourie	Member of the South Carolina Senate from the 22nd district 2017–present	Incumbent
