= Economic policy of the first Trump administration =

The economic policy of the first Trump administration was characterized by the individual and corporate tax cuts, attempts to repeal the Affordable Care Act ("Obamacare"), trade protectionism, deregulation focused on the energy and financial sectors, and responses to the COVID-19 pandemic.

Over his first term, Trump reduced federal taxes and increased federal spending, both of which significantly increased federal budget deficits and the national debt. The positive economic situation he inherited from the Obama administration continued, with a labor market approaching full employment and measures of household income and wealth continuing to improve further into record territory. Trump also implemented trade protectionism via tariffs, primarily on imports from China. During Trump's first three years in office, the number of Americans without health insurance increased by 4.6 million (16%), while his tax cuts favored the top earners, and failed to deliver on its promises, worsened income inequality, and eroded the country’s revenue needed to continue investment to critical programs like social security and medicine.

Trump took office for the first time at the height of the longest economic expansion in American history. The 128-month (10.7-year) economic expansion that began in June 2009 abruptly ended at a peak in February 2020, with the U.S. entering a recession due to the COVID-19 pandemic. The U.S. unemployment rate, which had hit a 50-year low (3.5%) in February 2020, hit a 90-year high (14.7%) just two months later, matching Great Depression levels. In response, Trump signed the $2 trillion Coronavirus Aid, Relief, and Economic Security Act (CARES) on March 27, 2020 which helped maintain family incomes and savings during the crisis, but contributed to a $3.1 trillion budget deficit (14.9% GDP) for fiscal year 2020, the largest since 1945 relative to the size of the economy. Trump left office with 3 million fewer jobs in the U.S. than when he took office, making Trump the only modern U.S. president to leave office with a smaller workforce though this was, in part, due to the COVID-19 pandemic. Throughout his presidency, Trump mischaracterized the economy as the best in American history.

Despite saying during the 2016 campaign he would eliminate the national debt in eight years, Trump as president approved large increases in government spending, as well as the 2017 tax cut. As a result, the federal budget deficit increased by almost 50%, to nearly $1 trillion (~$1.24 trillion in 2025) in 2019. Under Trump, the U.S. national debt increased by 39%, reaching $27.75 trillion by the end of his term; the U.S. debt-to-GDP ratio also hit a post-World War II high.

Analysts argued that there is little evidence that either the economy or employment was impacted in the first 2.5 years of his term despite the Tax Cuts and Jobs Act (TCJA) and other policies. Additionally, a review by the Tax Policy Center indicated that the TCJA had little impact on business investment.

== Personnel ==
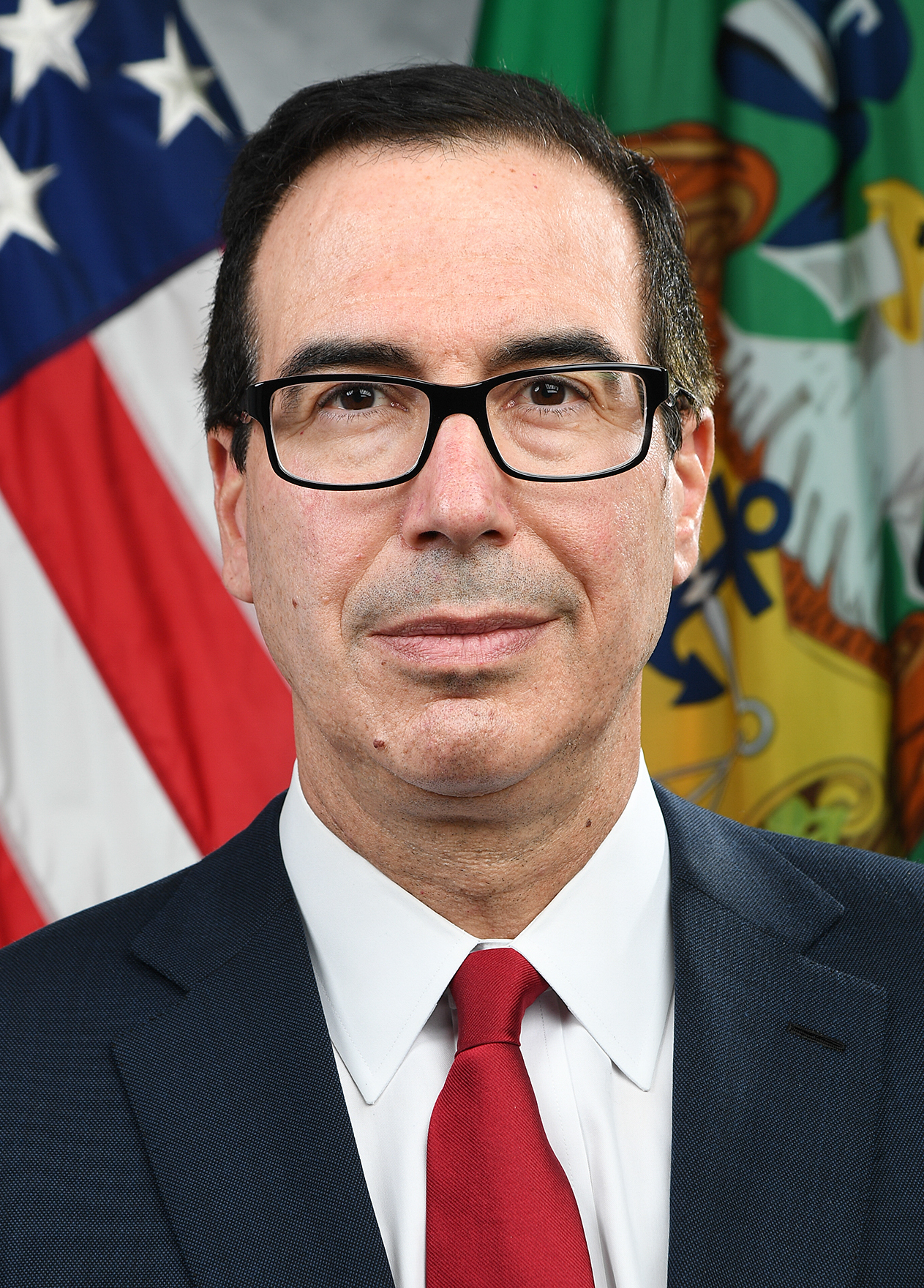
Steve Mnuchin, the U.S. secretary of the treasury

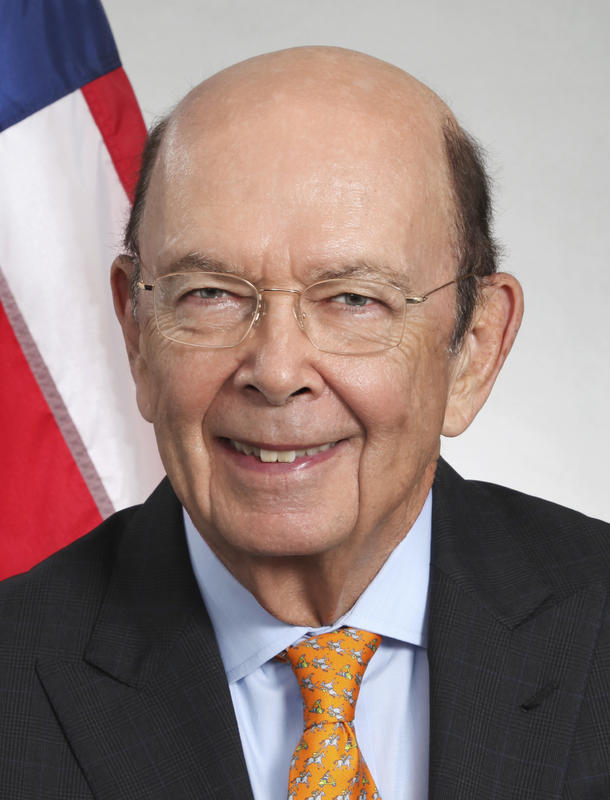
Wilbur Ross, the U.S. secretary of commerce

In November 2016, as president-elect, Trump nominated several officials to serve in his cabinet during his first presidency. He nominated Wilbur Ross as the United States Secretary of Commerce, Steve Mnuchin as the United States Secretary of the Treasury, and Mick Mulvaney as the director of the Office of Management and Budget (OMB).

== Economic strategy ==
The economic policy positions of United States President Donald Trump prior to his election had elements from across the political spectrum. However, once in office his actions indicated a politically rightward shift towards more conservative economic policies. Trump's economic and trade policy has been described as neomercantilist.

Prior to election, then-candidate Trump proposed sizable income tax cuts and deregulation consistent with conservative (Republican Party) policies, along with significant infrastructure investment and status-quo protection for entitlements for the elderly, typically considered liberal (Democratic Party) policies. His anti-globalization policies of trade protectionism and immigration reduction cross party lines. This combination of policy positions from both parties could be considered "populist" and likely succeeded in converting some of the 2012 Obama voters who became Trump voters in 2016.

Trump's federal budget proposal for the 2018 fiscal year (submitted to Congress in January 2017) proposed a $1.9 trillion reduction in healthcare spending for health care, primarily in cuts to Medicaid; a $1.9 trillion decrease in nondefense discretionary spending and "overseas contingency operations" defense spending (Afghanistan and other items), various tax-cut proposals that would reduce revenues by $894 billion (or 2%) from 2018 to 2027 period; a decrease in outlays for income security programs by $238 billion over the next ten years; and spending $200 billion over the next ten years for unspecified infrastructure programs.

Journalist Matthew Yglesias wrote in December 2017 that while Trump campaigned as a populist, much of his post-election economic agenda has been consistent with far-right economic policy: "His decision to refashion himself in office as a down-the-line exponent of hard-right policies has been the key strategic decision of the Trump presidency." Yglesias hypothesized this was a bargain to reduce Congressional oversight of the executive branch. Economist Paul Krugman expressed a similar view in February 2020, writing that Trump's initial promises of a more bi-partisan agenda (e.g., raising taxes on the rich, infrastructure investment and preserving safety net programs) ultimately gave way to pursuing more typical Republican policy priorities of tax cuts and reduced safety net spending, although without the previous concerns about the budget deficit that Republicans expressed during the Obama Administration.

Trump also sought to enlist the aid of the U.S. Federal Reserve in supporting his attempts to stimulate the economy. Initially, Fed officials hinted in December 2016 that fiscal policy stimulus (i.e., tax cuts and increased government spending) in an economy already near full employment and growing near its maximum sustainable pace of around 2%, might be counteracted by tightening monetary policy (e.g., raising interest rates) to offset the risk of inflation. To paraphrase a former Fed chairman, "The Fed's job is to take away the punch bowl just when the party gets going." However, after raising rates through 2018, in 2019 the Fed reduced interest rates several times, citing the related issues of a global economic slowdown and Trump's trade policies. President Trump often criticized the Fed for raising interest rates during his tenure, although he also criticized the Fed for keeping rates low during President Obama's administration.

== Overall evaluations ==
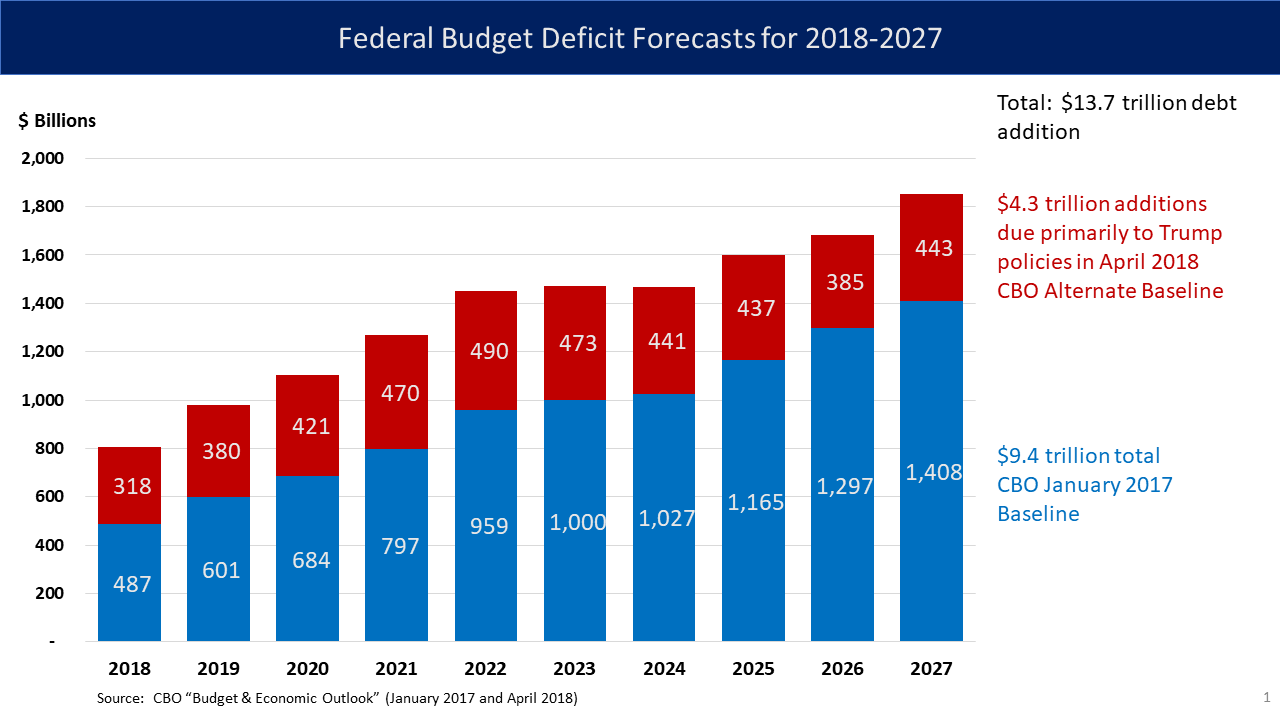
The CBO forecast in April 2018 that under current policy, the sum of annual federal budget deficits (debt increases) would be $13.7 trillion over the 2018–2027 time period. This is $4.3 trillion higher (46%) than the CBO January 2017 baseline of $9.4 trillion. The change is mainly due to the Tax Cuts and Jobs Act of 2017. This was later revised upward due to the coronavirus pandemic.

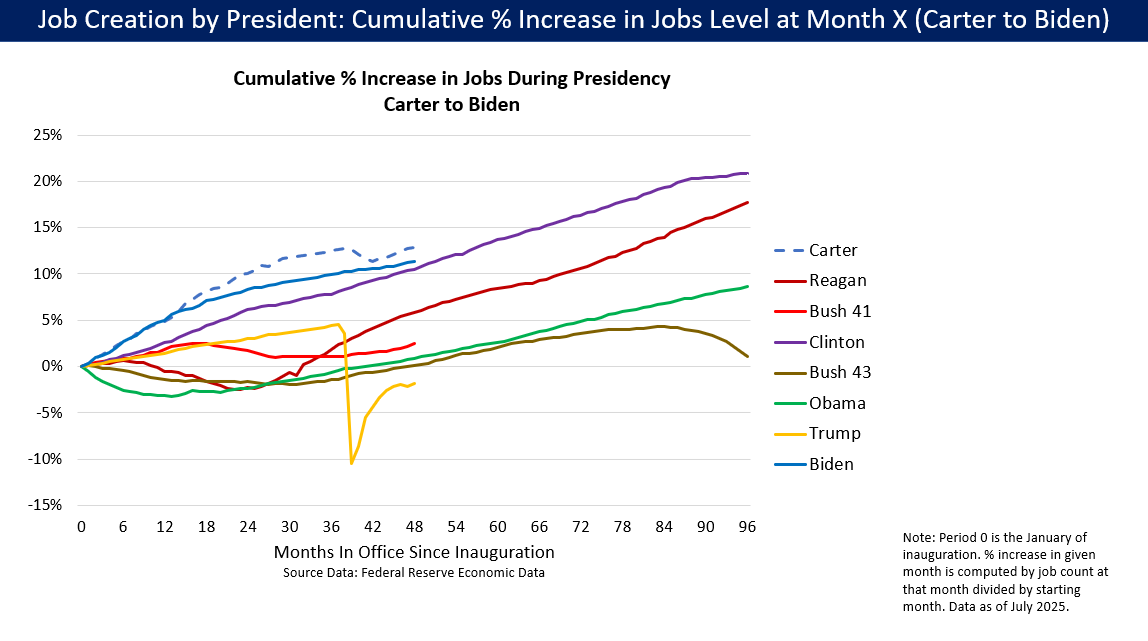
Job Growth by U.S. president, measured as cumulative percentage change from month after inauguration to end of term. As of September 2020, the number of jobs was 2.7% below the January 2017 level when President Trump was inaugurated, and 7.0% below the February 2020 peak. About half of the peak-to-trough jobs lost had been regained.

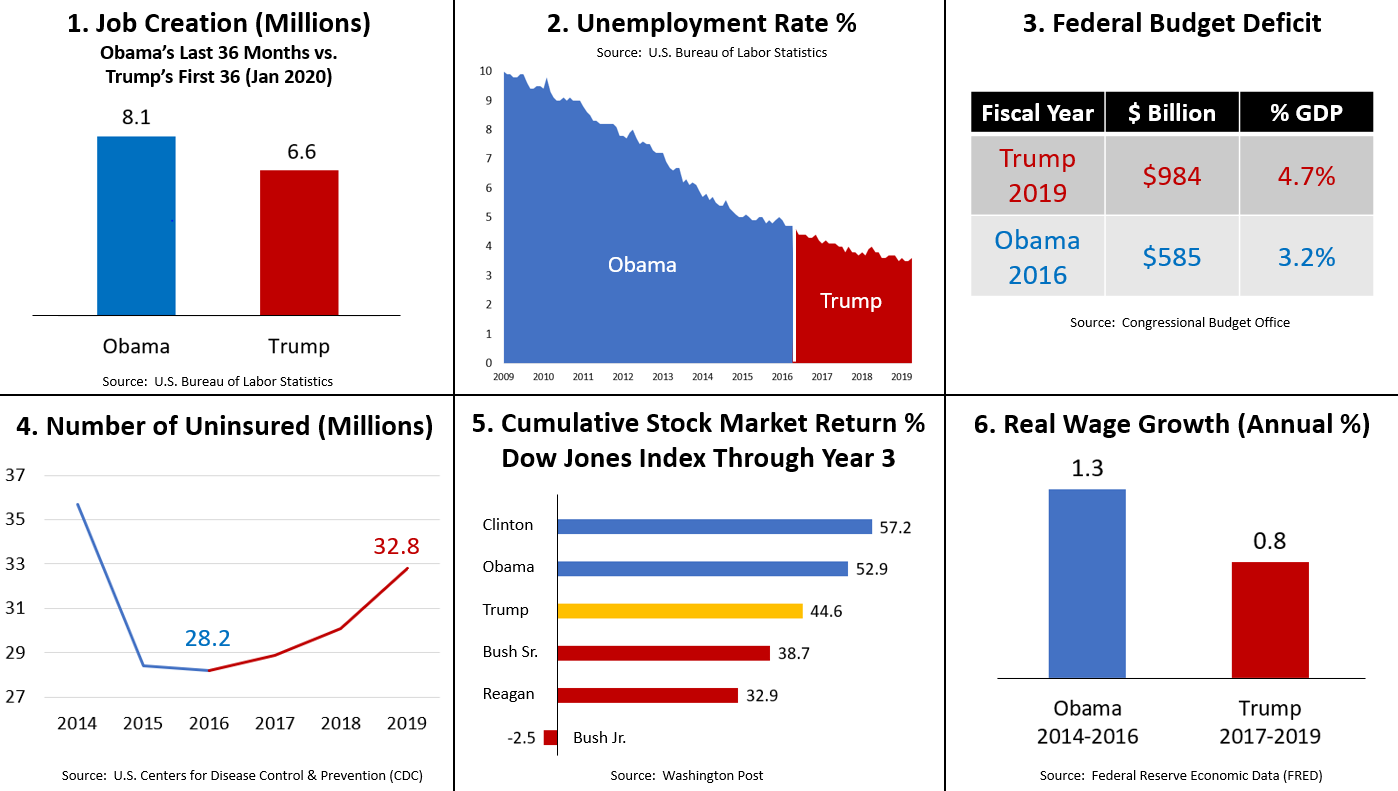
Economic scorecard comparing Trump and Obama presidencies. Refer to sources on the detail page.

Economist Justin Wolfers wrote in February 2019: "I've reviewed surveys of about 50 leading economists – liberals and conservatives – run by the University of Chicago. What is startling is that the economists are nearly unanimous in concluding that Mr. Trump's policies are destructive." He assigned a letter grade of A− to the economy's performance overall, despite "failing grades" for Trump's policies, including an "F" grade for trade policy, "D−" for fiscal policy, and a "C" for monetary policy. One July 2018 study indicated Trump's policies have had little impact on the U.S. economy in terms of GDP or employment.

Writing in The New York Times, Steven Rattner explained in August 2018:

Yes, the economy is continuing to expand nicely, which all Americans should celebrate. But no, there's nothing remarkable in the overall results since Mr. Trump took office. Most importantly, there is little evidence that the president's policies have meaningfully improved the fortunes of those 'forgotten' Americans who elected him.

Rattner explained that job creation and real wage growth had slowed comparing the end of the Obama administration with an equal period elapsed during the Trump administration; that the 4.1% real GDP growth in Q2 2018 was increased by non-recurring trade contributions and was exceeded during four quarters of the Obama Administration; that 84% of the benefits of the Trump tax cuts would go to businesses and individuals with incomes greater than $75,000 (thus increasing inequality); that the tax cuts and spending increases were forecast to increase the budget deficit in 2019 to nearly $1 trillion, double the previous forecast; and that half the benefit of the tax cuts for the typical middle-class worker in 2018 would be offset by higher gas prices. Rattner expanded his analysis in December 2018, explaining further that the debt to GDP ratio was on a much higher trajectory compared to the forecast when Trump took office, with as much as $16 trillion more federal debt added over a decade.

Writing in The Washington Post, Heather Long explained in August 2019 that: "[A] closer look at the data shows a mixed picture in terms of whether the economy is any better than it was in Obama's final years. The economy is growing at about the same pace as it did in Obama's last years, and unemployment, while lower under Trump, has continued a trend that began in 2011." Nominal wages, consumer and business confidence, and manufacturing job creation (initially) compared favorably, while government debt, trade deficits, and persons without health insurance did not.

Writing in The Washington Post, Phillip Bump explained that for Trump's first term as of September 2019, performance on several key variables was comparable or below Obama's second term (January 2013 – September 2016), as follows: 1) Real GDP was up 7.5% cumulatively under Obama, versus 7.2% under Trump; 2) The total number of jobs was up 5.3% for Obama, versus 4.3% under Trump; 3) The S&P 500 was up moderately more under Obama at +39.9% versus Trump at +34.2%; 4) The unemployment rate fell 2.9 percentage points under Obama versus 1.2 points under Trump; and 5) the national debt was up 10.5% under Obama, versus 15.1% under Trump.

Factcheck.org reported in November 2019 that: "There's no question the economy has been strong since Trump took office, but it was also strong before he took office, a fact he continues to distort as he falsely puffs up his own record." For example, Trump promised real GDP growth of 4–6% per year, but only achieved 2.9% growth in 2018, the same rate as 2015. Further, job creation was slower under President Trump than comparable periods at the end of the Obama Administration. Many of Trump's claims about unemployment, labor force participation, and median household income were also false or exaggerated.

Writing in The New Yorker, John Cassidy described the opportunity costs of Trump's tax cuts:

Some of the debt that is being issued to pay for the tax cut could have been used to finance investments in infrastructure, renewable energy sources, universal day care, adult retraining, reducing the cost of higher education, or any other number of programs that yield long-term benefits to ordinary Americans. Instead, the biggest handouts went to corporations, who saw their tax rate [statutory] reduced from 35% to 21%.

President Trump claimed in his third State of the Union Address in February 2020 that: "If we hadn't reversed the failed economic policies of the previous administration, the world would not now be witnessing this great economic success." The Trump administration provided statistics in support of this claim. However, Politifact rated this claim false, explaining: "The bottom line: For virtually each of these measurements, we found that the trend lines continued almost seamlessly from the second half of Obama's presidency into the first three years of Trump's tenure. Trump's claim that he turned around a failing economy is wrong."

NBC explained in August 2020 that Trump inherited a solid economy: "If you compare key economic indicators from Barack Obama's second term in office to the first three years of Trump's time (that is, before the pandemic hit), the data show a continuation of trends, not a dramatic shift. It suggests Trump didn't build something new; rather he inherited a pretty good situation."

== Statistical summaries ==
=== Annual comparisons 2014–2019 ===
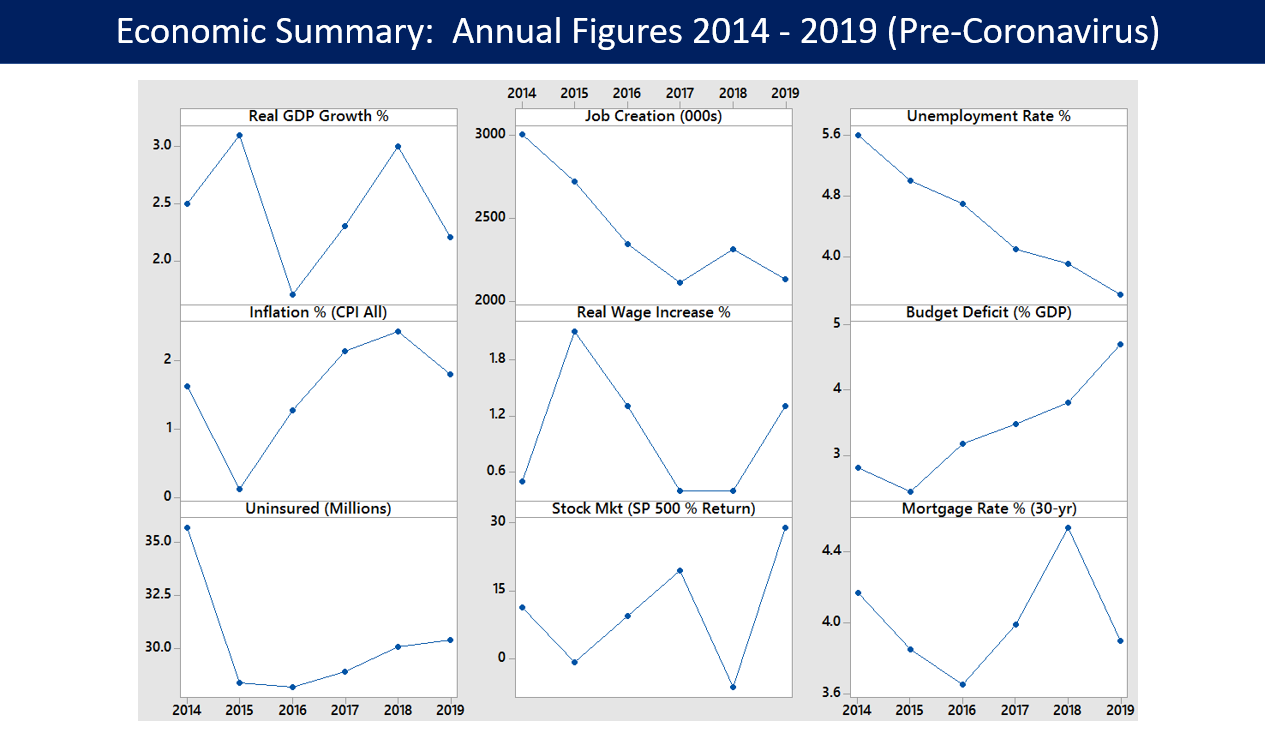
Panel chart illustrates nine key economic variables measured annually from 2014 to 2019. The years 2014–2016 were during President Obama's second term, while 2017–2019 were during President Trump's first term. Refer to citations on detail page.

The following table illustrates some of the key economic variables in the last three years of the Obama Administration (2014–2016) and the first three years of the Trump Administration (2017–2019). The arrows indicate whether the variable improved (green) or worsened (red) versus the prior year.

Variable	2014	2015	2016	2017	2018	2019
Real GDP growth	2.5%	▲3.1%	▼1.7%	▲2.3%	▲3.0%	▼2.2%
Job creation per month (000s)	250	▼227	▼195	▼176	▲193	▼178
Mfg. job creation per month (000s)	17	▼6	▼−1	▲15	▲22	▼5
Unemployment rate (December)	5.6%	▼5.0%	▼4.7%	▼4.1%	▼3.9%	▼3.5%
Labor force participation Age 25–54 (Dec)	80.9%	▲81.0%	▲81.4%	▲81.9%	▲82.3%	▲82.9%
Inflation rate (CPI-All, Avg.)	1.6%	▼0.1%	▲1.3%	▲2.1%	▲2.4%	▼1.8%
Poverty rate %	14.8%	▼13.5%	▼12.7%	▼12.3%	▼11.8%	▼10.5%
Real median household income $	$56,969	▲$60,987	▲$62,898	▲$63,761	▲$64,324	▲$68,703
Real wage growth %	0.4%	▲2.2%	▼1.3%	▼0.4%	▲0.6%	▲1.3%
Productivity growth %	0.9%	▲1.3%	▼0.3%	▲1.3%	▲1.3%	▲1.6%
Mortgage rate 30-yr fixed (avg.)	4.2%	▼3.9%	▼3.7%	▲4.0%	▲4.5%	▼3.9%
Gas prices (avg.)	$3.36	▼$2.43	▼$2.14	▲$2.42	▲$2.72	▼$2.60
Stock market annual % increase (SP 500)	+11.4%	▼−0.7%	▲+9.5%	▲+19.4%	▼−6.2%	▲+28.9%
Number uninsured under 65 yrs. (millions)	35.7	▼28.4	▼28.2	▲28.9	▲30.1	▲32.8
Health insurance premium (family/employer mkt % chg)	3.0%	▲4.2%	▼3.4%	3.4%	▲4.5%	▲4.9%
Trade deficit % GDP	2.8%	▼2.7%	2.7%	▲2.8%	▲3.0%	▼2.9%
Budget deficit ($ Billions)	$485	▼$442	▲$585	▲$665	▲$779	▲$984
Budget deficit % GDP	2.8%	▼2.4%	▲3.2%	▲3.5%	▲3.9%	▲4.6%
Debt held by public % GDP	73.7%	▼72.5%	▲76.4%	▼76.1%	▲77.8%	▲78.9%
Growth in Real Federal Debt Held By Public	4.8%	▼4.6%	▼3.3%	▼0.5%	▲6.8%	▼5.9%
Inequality: Third Quintile Income Share	14.3%	14.3%	▼14.2%	▼14.0%	▲14.1%	14.1%
Border apprehensions-FY total (000s)	487	▼337	▲416	▼310	▲404	▲860
Carbon dioxide emissions (Metric tons in millions)	5,413	▼5,263	▼5,170	▼5,131	▲5,280	Not avail.

=== Coronavirus impact 2020 ===
The following table illustrates the impact of the pandemic on key economic measures. February 2020 represented the pre-crisis level for most monthly variables, with the S&P 500 stock market index (a leading daily indicator) falling from its February 19 peak.

Variable	Feb	Mar	Apr	May	June	July	August	September
Jobs, level (000s)	152,523	150,840	130,161	132,994	137,840	139,566	141,149	141,865
Jobs, monthly change (000s)	251	−1,683	−20,679	2,833	4,846	1,726	1,583	716
Unemployment rate %	3.5%	4.4%	14.8%	13.3%	11.1%	10.2%	8.4%	7.8%
Number unemployed (millions)	5.8	7.1	23.1	21.0	17.8	16.3	13.6	12.6
Employment to population ratio %, age 25–54	80.5%	79.6%	69.7%	71.4%	73.5%	73.8%	75.3%	75.0%
Inflation rate % (CPI-All)	2.3%	1.5%	0.4%	0.2%	0.7%	1.0%	1.3%	1.4%
Stock market S&P 500 (avg. level)	3,277	2,652	2,762	2,920	3,105	3,208	3,392	3,432
Debt held by public ($ trillion)	17.4	17.7	19.1	19.9	20.5	20.6	20.8	21.0

=== End of Term vs. Inauguration ===
The following table compares the data at the end of Trumps term, with levels at the time of Trump's inauguration in January 2017. For quarterly or annual variables, the figure closest to the date indicated is used. For the deficit, the CBO forecast for FY2020 is used.

Variable	January 2017	January 2021	Change	% Change
Jobs, level (millions)	145.6	142.6	−3.0	−2.0%
Unemployment rate %	4.7%	6.3%	1.6 pp	n/a
Number unemployed (millions)	7.5	10.1	2.7	36%
Real GDP level ($ trillions)	17.9	18.8	+0.9	+5.1%
Budget deficit ($ billions)	665	3,131	2,466	371%
Stock market S&P 500	2,263	3,798	1,535	68%
Debt held by public ($ trillions)	14.4	21.6	7.2	50%

== Health care ==
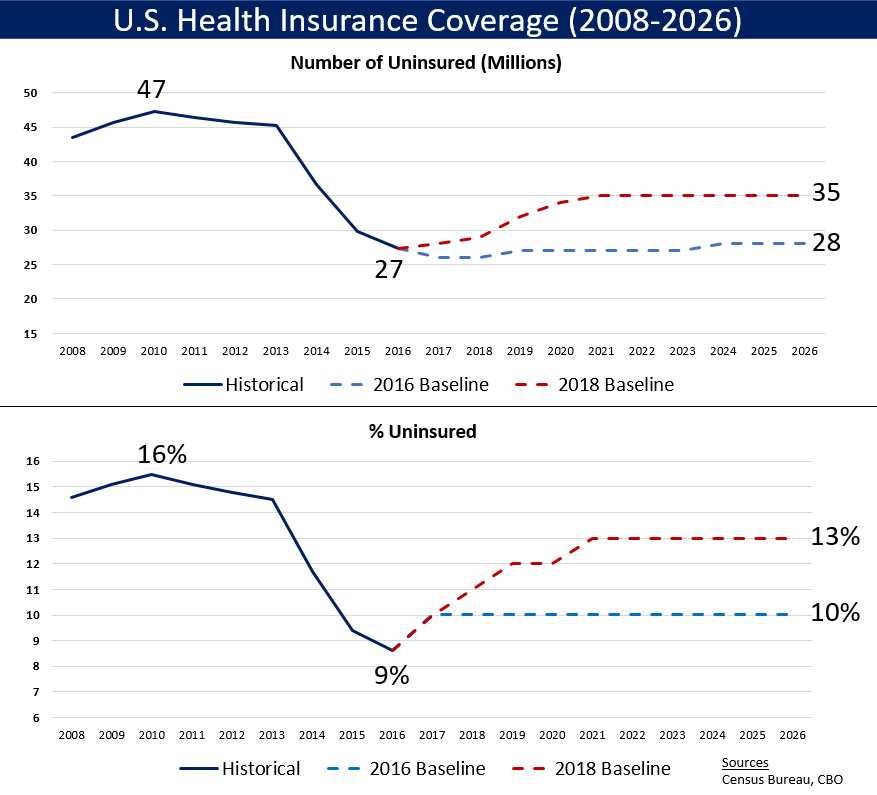
U.S. uninsured number (millions) and rate (%), including historical data through 2016 and two CBO forecasts (2016/Obama policy and 2018/Trump policy) through 2026. Two key reasons for more uninsured under President Trump include: 1) Eliminating the individual mandate to have health insurance; and 2) Stopping cost-sharing reduction payments.

=== Health insurance coverage ===
Before his term and throughout his term, Trump said he was nearing completion of a new health insurance program to replace the Affordable Care Act (the ACA or "Obamacare"); at various times, Trump said that, "We're going to have insurance for everybody" and that he would repeal the ACA and replace it with something "terrific," "phenomenal" and "fantastic" that would be more generous than the ACA. Despite these pledges, Trump never proposed such a plan.

Gains in healthcare coverage under Obama reversed under Trump:

- The Centers for Disease Control reported that the number of uninsured persons under age 65 rose from 28.2 million in 2016 to 32.8 million in 2019, an increase of 4.6 million or 16%; 2017 was the first year since 2010 with an increase. The rate of uninsured rose from 10.4% in 2016 to 12.1% in 2019.
- The Census Bureau reported in September 2020 that the number of uninsured increased from 27.3 million in 2016 to 29.6 million in 2019, an increase of 2.3 million or 8%. The rate of uninsured rose from 8.6% in 2016 to 9.2% in 2019. Further, the number of children under age 19 without health insurance increased from 3.9 million in 2017 to 4.3 million in 2018 (mainly due to declines in public coverage), then fell to 4.0 million in 2019.
- CBO forecast in May 2019 that 6 million more would be without health insurance in 2021 under Trump's policies (33 million), relative to continuation of Obama policies (27 million).

The Commonwealth Fund reported that the number of uninsured was increasing due to two factors: 1) Not addressing specific weaknesses in the ACA; and 2) Actions by the Trump administration that exacerbated those weaknesses. The impact was greater among lower-income adults, who had a higher uninsured rate than higher-income adults. Regionally, the South and West had higher uninsured rates than the North and East. Further, those 18 states that have not expanded Medicaid had a higher uninsured rate than those that did. Gallup cited a "number of factors" for the increase, including: an increase in 2018 premiums; reduction in marketing and enrollment periods; reduced funding for enrollment support; elimination of the individual mandate; and elimination of cost-sharing reduction subsidies. The Washington Post cited research indicating that mortality increases about one person per 800 without health insurance, so 2 million more uninsured represents 2,500 avoidable deaths per year.

The 2020 Coronavirus pandemic was also expected to increase the number of uninsured significantly, as millions lost jobs and their employer-provided healthcare. One study placed the number over 5 million, versus nearly 4 million due to the Great Recession of 2007–2009.

=== Legislation ===
President Trump advocated repealing and replacing the Affordable Care Act (ACA or "Obamacare"). The Republican-controlled House passed the American Health Care Act (AHCA) in May 2017, handing it to the Senate, which decided to write its own version of the bill rather than voting on the AHCA. The Senate bill, called the "Better Care Reconciliation Act of 2017" (BCRA), failed on a vote of 45–55 in the Senate during July 2017. Other variations also failed to gather the required support, facing unanimous Democratic Party opposition and some Republican opposition. The Congressional Budget Office estimated that the bills would increase the number of uninsured by over 20 million persons while reducing the budget deficit marginally.

=== Actions to hinder implementation of ACA ===
President Trump continued Republican attacks on the ACA while in office, according to The New York Times, including steps such as:

- Weakening the individual mandate through his first executive order, which resulted in limiting enforcement of mandate penalties by the IRS. For example, tax returns without indications of health insurance ("silent returns") will still be processed, overriding instructions from the Obama administration to the IRS to reject them.
- Reducing funding for advertising for the 2017 and 2018 exchange enrollment periods by up to 90%, with other reductions to support resources used to answer questions and help people sign-up for coverage. This action could reduce ACA enrollment.
- Cutting the enrollment period for 2018 by half, to 45 days. The NYT editorial board referred to this as part of a concerted "sabotage" effort.
- Issuing public statements that the exchanges are unstable or in a death spiral. CBO reported in May 2017 that the exchanges would remain stable under current law (ACA), but would be less stable if the AHCA were passed.

Several insurers and actuary groups cited uncertainty created by President Trump, specifically non-enforcement of the individual mandate and not funding cost sharing reduction subsidies, as contributing 20–30 percentage points to premium increases for the 2018 plan year on the ACA exchanges. In other words, absent Trump's actions against the ACA, premium increases would have averaged 10% or less, rather than the estimated 28–40% under the uncertainty his actions created. The Center on Budget and Policy Priorities (CBPP) maintains a timeline of many "sabotage" efforts by the Trump Administration.

The New York Times reported in December 2017 that about 8.8 million persons signed up for ACA coverage via the marketplace exchanges for the 2018 policy period, roughly 96% of the 9.2 million who signed-up for the 2017 policy period. An estimated 2.4 million were new customers and 6.4 million returned. These figures represent the national Healthcare.gov exchanges in 39 states and not 11 states that operate their own exchanges and also reported strong enrollment. The enrollment numbers "essentially defied President Trump's assertion that 'Obamacare is imploding'".

About 80% of persons who buy insurance through the marketplaces qualify for subsidies to help pay premiums. The Trump Administration reported in October 2017 that the average subsidy would rise to $555 per month in 2018, up 45% from 2017. This increase was due significantly to the actions it took to hinder ACA implementation. Prior to Trump taking office, several insurance companies estimated there would be a 10% increase in premiums and related subsidies for 2017.

=== Ending cost-sharing reduction (CSR) payments ===
President Trump announced in October 2017 he would end the smaller of the two types of subsidies under the ACA, the cost-sharing reduction (CSR) subsidies. This controversial decision significantly raised premiums on the ACA exchanges (as much as 20 percentage points) along with the premium tax credit subsidies that rise with them, with the CBO estimating a $200 billion increase in the budget deficit over a decade. CBO also estimated that initially up to one million fewer would have health insurance coverage, although more might have it in the long run as the subsidies expand. CBO expected the exchanges to remain stable (e.g., no "death spiral") as the premiums would increase and prices would stabilize at the higher (non-CSR) level.

President Trump's argument that the CSR payments were a "bailout" for insurance companies and therefore should be stopped, actually results in the government paying more to insurance companies ($200B over a decade) due to increases in the premium tax credit subsidies. Journalist Sarah Kliff therefore described Trump's argument as "completely incoherent."

=== Repeal of the ACA individual mandate ===
President Trump signed the Tax Cuts and Jobs Act into law in December 2017, which included the repeal of the individual mandate of the Affordable Care Act (ACA). This removed the requirement that all persons purchase health insurance or pay a penalty. The Congressional Budget Office estimated that up to 13 million fewer persons would be covered by health insurance by 2027 relative to prior law and insurance premiums on the exchanges would increase by about 10 percentage points. This is because removing the mandate encourages younger and typically healthier persons to opt out of health insurance on the ACA exchanges, increasing premiums for the remainder. The non-group insurance market (which includes the ACA exchanges) would continue to be stable (i.e., no "death spiral"). CBO estimated this would reduce government spending for healthcare subsidies to lower income persons by up to $338 billion (~$426 billion in 2025) in total during the 2018–2027 period compared to the prior law baseline. Trump stated in an interview with The New York Times in December 2017: "I believe we can do health care in a bipartisan way, because we've essentially gutted and ended Obamacare."

The CBO released an analysis on May 23, 2018, indicating that repeal of the individual mandate will increase the number of uninsured by 3 million and increase individual healthcare insurance premiums by 10% through 2019. The CBO projected that another 3 million would become uninsured over the following two years due to repeal of the mandate. CBO released an analysis in May 2019 that stated: "By 2021, in the current baseline, 7 million more people are uninsured than would have been if the individual mandate penalty had not been repealed; subsequently, that number remains roughly constant to the end of the projection period in 2029."

=== Pre-existing conditions ===
The New York Times explained that the Affordable Care Act (ACA) was passed in 2010 and extended protections to those with pre-existing health conditions, requiring insurers to "offer coverage to anyone who wishes to buy it, with prices varying only by region and age of the customer." Prior to the ACA, insurers in most states (where not prohibited by state law) were able to discriminate against persons on the basis of their health history. President Trump advocated for the repeal of the ACA in 2017, which would have eliminated these protections.

Further, on June 7, 2018, the Trump Justice Department notified a federal court that the ACA provisions that prohibit insurers from denying coverage or charging higher rates to people with pre-existing conditions were inextricably linked to the individual mandate and so must be struck down, hence the Department would no longer defend those provisions in court. Polls have consistently shown that the pre-existing conditions provisions have been the most popular aspect of ACA. Trump has falsely claimed he saved the coverage of pre-existing conditions provided in ACA.

The Centers for Medicare and Medicaid Services website states that 50–129 million non-elderly Americans (19–50 percent) have pre-existing conditions that could place them at risk of losing insurance coverage without ACA protections.

=== Healthcare costs ===
President Trump campaigned that he would support allowing the government to negotiate drug prices with drug companies, to push costs down. However, when House Democrats passed a bill (H.R.3) to do just that, Trump vowed to veto the bill. CBO estimated that the price negotiation provisions of H.R.3 would reduce costs by $456 billion over a decade, while provisions to expand dental, vision, and hearing coverage under Medicare would raise spending by $358 billion.

In his February 2020 State of the Union speech, President Trump stated that "...for the first time in 51 years, the cost of prescription drugs actually went down." However, Politifact rated this claim as "Mostly False", explaining that: "In 2019, 4,311 prescription drugs experienced a price hike, with the average increase hovering around 21%, according to data compiled by Rx Savings Solutions, a consulting group. Meanwhile, 619 drugs had price dips. And already in 2020, 2,519 drugs have increased prices. The average hike so far this year is 6.9%. Meanwhile, the prices of 70 drugs have dropped."

The Kaiser Family Foundation surveyed the employer-sponsored health insurance market, reporting in September 2019 that:

- Annual family premiums for employer-sponsored health insurance increased from $19,616 in 2018 to $20,576 in 2019, up $960 or 4.9%.
- Increases from 2014 to 2016 averaged 3.5%, while increases from 2017 to 2019 averaged 4.3%.
- Deductibles for single coverage averaged $1,655 in 2019, similar to 2018. However, this was 41% above the $989 for 2014.
- The percentage of workers with an annual deductible over $2,000 increased from 16% in 2016 to 22% in 2019.
- Premium growth exceeds inflation and wage growth, and the prices employer plans pay for care are rising faster than either Medicare or Medicaid.

=== Consequences if ACA repealed ===
President Trump and Republicans in Congress tried repeatedly to repeal or replace the ACA, without success. In February 2018, 20 states, led by Texas Attorney General Ken Paxton and Wisconsin Attorney General Brad Schimel, filed a lawsuit against the federal government alleging the ACA is now unconstitutional because the individual mandate tax which NFIB v. Sebelius rested on was repealed by the Tax Cuts and Jobs Act of 2017.

Writing in The Washington Post in September 2020, Catherine Rampell predicted some of the most adverse consequences if the ACA is overturned by the U.S. Supreme Court as:

- 50+ million non-elderly adults with pre-existing conditions could be declined health insurance, or be charged more by insurance companies
- 12+ million low-income persons would become ineligible for Medicaid, thereby losing insurance
- 9+ million persons receiving tax credits to reduce insurance premiums on the exchanges would either pay more or lose coverage
- Minimum essential coverage for prescription benefits and substance abuse treatment would no longer be required in insurance policies
- Children would no longer be able to stay on their parents' plans until age 26
- Preventive care would again involve cost-sharing (co-pays)
- More Americans would have healthcare plans without comprehensive protection
- Insurance companies would again be able to impose lifetime limits

== Taxation ==
=== 2017 proposal ===
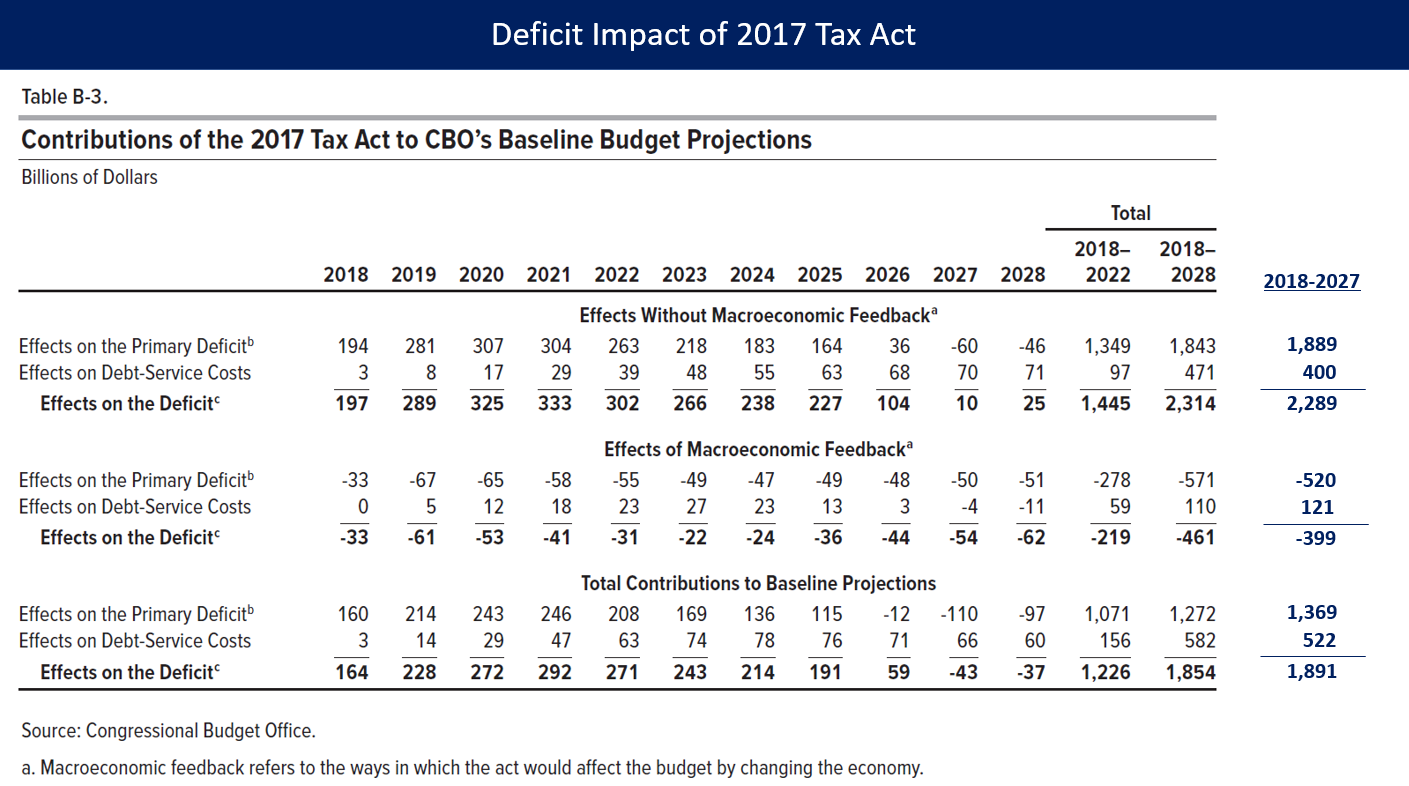
CBO forecasts that the 2017 Tax Act will increase the sum of budget deficits (debt) by $2.289 trillion over the 2018–2027 decade, or $1.891 trillion after macro-economic feedback.

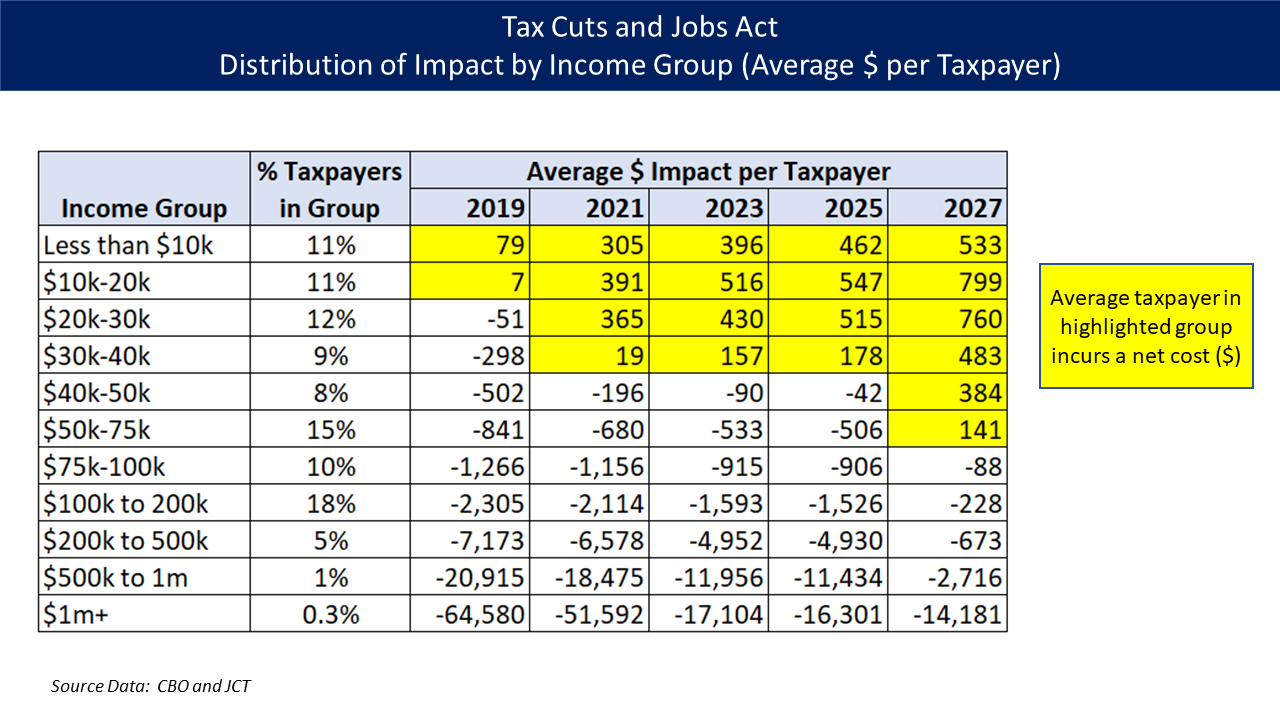
CBO and JCT estimate of the distribution of impact by income group (average dollars per taxpayer) under the Tax Cuts and Jobs Act. On average, taxpayers in the income groups highlighted in yellow will incur a net cost (shown as a positive figure as this reduces the budget deficit), mainly due to reduced healthcare subsidies. Higher income taxpayers receive a benefit via tax cuts (shown as a negative number as this increases the budget deficit). The percent of taxpayers in each income group is also shown for the 2023 period.

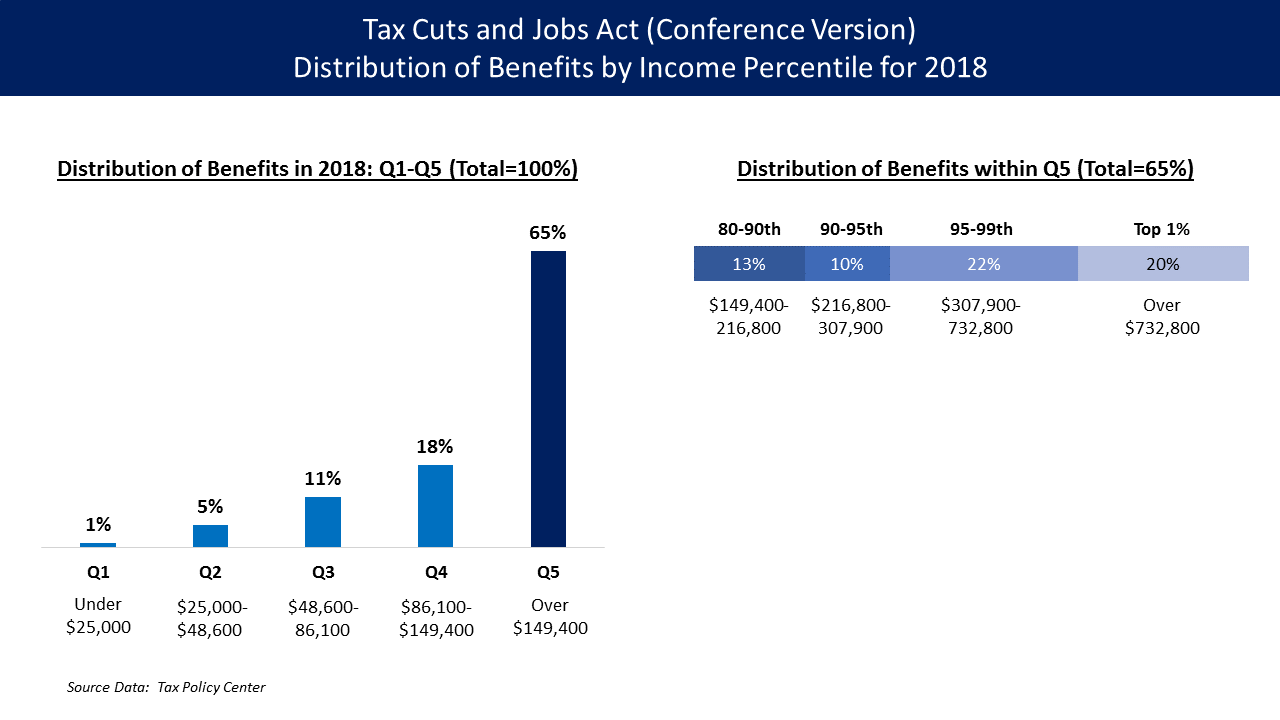
Distribution of benefits during 2018 by income percentile under the Tax Cuts and Jobs Act (Conf. Cmte. version) based on data from the Tax Policy Center. The top 10% of taxpayers (incomes over $216,800) receive 52% of the benefit, while the bottom 60% (incomes under $86,100) receive 17% of the benefit. This excludes the impact of reduced ACA subsidies.

In late September 2017, the Trump administration proposed a tax overhaul. The proposal would reduce the corporate tax rate to 20% (from 35%) and eliminate the estate tax. On individual tax returns it would change the number of tax brackets from seven to three, with tax rates of 12%, 25%, and 35%; apply a 25% tax rate to business income reported on a personal tax return; eliminate the alternative minimum tax; eliminate personal exemptions; double the standard deduction; and eliminate many itemized deductions (specifically retaining the deductions for mortgage interest and charitable contributions). It is unclear from the details offered whether a middle-class couple with children would see tax increase or tax decrease.

In October 2017 the Republican-controlled Senate and House passed a resolution to provide for $1.5 trillion (~$1.93 trillion in 2025) in deficits over ten years to enable enactment of the Trump tax cut. As Reuters reported:

Republicans are traditionally opposed to letting the deficit grow. But in a stark reversal of that stance, the party's budget resolution, previously passed by the Senate, called for adding up to $1.5 trillion to federal deficits over the next decade to pay for the tax cuts.

In December 2017, the Trump Treasury Department released a one-page summary of the nearly 500-page Senate tax bill that suggested the tax cut would more than pay for itself, based on an assumption of higher economic growth than any independent analysis had forecast. Every detailed, independent analysis found that the enacted tax cut would increase budget deficits.

The House passed its version of the Trump tax plan on November 16, 2017, and the Senate passed its version on December 2, 2017. Important differences between the bills were reconciled by a conference committee on December 15, 2017. The President signed the bill into law on December 22, 2017.

Major elements of the new tax law include reducing tax rates for businesses and individuals; a personal tax simplification by increasing the standard deduction and family tax credits, but eliminating personal exemptions and making it less beneficial to itemize deductions; limiting deductions for state and local income taxes (SALT) and property taxes; further limiting the mortgage interest deduction; reducing the alternative minimum tax for individuals and eliminating it for corporations; reducing the number of estates impacted by the estate tax; and repealing the individual mandate of the Affordable Care Act (ACA).

Just prior to signing the bill, Trump asserted the new tax law might generate GDP growth as high as 6%.

On numerous occasions, Trump has falsely asserted the tax cut was the largest in history.

=== Impact on the economy, deficit and debt ===
The non-partisan Joint Committee on Taxation of the U.S. Congress published its macroeconomic analysis of the Senate version of the Act, on November 30, 2017:

- Gross domestic product would be 0.7% higher on average each year during the 2018–2027 period relative to the CBO baseline forecast, a cumulative total of $1,895 billion, due to an increase in labor supply and business investment. This is the level of GDP, not annual growth rate, so the economic impact is relatively minor.
- Employment would be about 0.6% higher each year during the 2018–2027 period than otherwise. The lower marginal tax rate on labor would provide "strong incentives for an increase in labor supply."
- Personal consumption, the largest component of GDP, would increase by 0.6%.

The CBO estimated in April 2018 that implementing the Act would add an estimated $2.289 trillion to the national debt over ten years, or about $1.891 trillion ($15,000 per household) after taking into account macroeconomic feedback effects, in addition to the $9.8 trillion increase forecast under the current policy baseline and existing $20 trillion national debt.

As Trump celebrated the six-month anniversary of the tax cut on June 29, 2018, National Economic Council director Larry Kudlow asserted that the tax cut was generating such growth that "it's throwing off enormous amount[s] of new tax revenues" and "the deficit, which was one of the other criticisms, is coming down—and it's coming down rapidly." Both assertions were incorrect. Since the tax cut was enacted, federal tax receipts increased 1.9% on a year-on-year basis, while they increased 4.0% during the comparable period in 2017. By the same method, the federal budget deficit increased 37.8% while it increased 16.4% during the comparable period in 2017. Kevin Hassett, chairman of Trump's Council of Economic Advisers, noted days earlier that the deficit was "skyrocketing," which is consistent with the analysis of every reputable budget analyst. Kudlow later asserted he was referring to future deficits, although every credible budget forecast indicates increasing deficits in coming years, made worse by the Trump tax cut if not offset by major spending cuts. Barring such spending cuts, the CBO projected the tax cut would add $1.27 trillion in deficits over the next decade, even after considering any economic growth the tax cut might generate.

Providing a twelve-month summary of the impact on the economy of the tax cut, Minton Beddoes as editor of The Economist compared the short-term impact on the US economy to long-term expectations stating: "Mr. Trump's economic stewardship is less stellar than his supporters claim. Yes, the economy is booming. But that is largely because it is in the midst of a sugar high thanks to a fiscally irresponsible tax cut."

The Trump administration predicted the tax cut would spur corporate capital investment and hiring. One year after enactment of the tax cut, a National Association for Business Economics survey of corporate economists found that 84% reported their firms had not changed their investment or hiring plans due to the tax cut. The International Monetary Fund also found the tax cut had little impact on business investment decisions, while the Penn Wharton Budget Model found that the increasing price of oil "explains the entire increase in the growth rate of investment in 2018." Trump has on several occasions taken credit for business investments that began before he became president.

Analysis released by the Congressional Research Service in May 2019 found that "On the whole, the growth effects tend to show a relatively small (if any) first-year effect on the economy." Analysis conducted by The New York Times in November 2019 found that average business investment was lower after the tax cut than before, and that firms receiving larger tax relief increased investment less than firms receiving smaller tax relief. The analysis also found that since the tax cut firms increased dividends and stock buybacks by nearly three times as much as they increased capital investments.

In a December 2019 opinion piece, former Trump economic advisors Kevin Hassett and Gary Cohn argued that the Trump tax cut had caused wages to rise faster for lower-wage workers than for higher-wage workers, thus delivering on a Trump campaign promise. Other analysts noted wages at the lower end of the income scale had increased at least in part due to numerous states raising their minimum wage in recent years.

=== Distribution of benefits and costs ===
The distribution of impact from the final version of the Act by individual income group varies significantly based on the assumptions involved and point in time measured. In general, businesses and upper income groups will mostly benefit regardless, while lower income groups will see the initial benefits fade over time or be adversely impacted. CBO reported on December 21, 2017, that: "Overall, the combined effect of the change in net federal revenue and spending is to decrease deficits (primarily stemming from reductions in spending) allocated to lower-income tax filing units and to increase deficits (primarily stemming from reductions in taxes) allocated to higher-income tax filing units."

For example:

- During 2019, income groups earning under $20,000 (about 23% of taxpayers) would contribute to deficit reduction (i.e., incur a cost), mainly by receiving fewer subsidies due to the repeal of the individual mandate of the Affordable Care Act. Other groups would contribute to deficit increases (i.e., receive a benefit), mainly due to tax cuts.
- During 2021, 2023, and 2025, income groups earning under $40,000 (about 43% of taxpayers) would contribute to deficit reduction, while income groups above $40,000 would contribute to deficit increases.
- During 2027, income groups earning under $75,000 (about 76% of taxpayers) would contribute to deficit reduction, while income groups above $75,000 would contribute to deficit increases.

The Joint Committee on Taxation reported in March 2019 that: "[G]enerally as income increases the average tax rate reduction increases." For example, in 2019 the average tax rate reduction for the group earning $50,000–$75,000 would be 1.3%, while the reduction for the group earning $1,000,000+ would be 2.3%.

The Tax Policy Center (TPC) reported its distributional estimates for the Act on December 18, 2017. This analysis excludes the impact from repealing the ACA individual mandate, which would apply significant costs primarily to income groups below $40,000. It also assumes the Act is deficit financed and thus excludes the impact of any spending cuts used to finance the Act, which also would fall disproportionally on lower income families as a percentage of their income.

- Compared to current law, 5% of taxpayers would pay more in 2018, 9% in 2025, and 53% in 2027.
- The top 1% of taxpayers (income over $732,800) would receive 8% of the benefit in 2018, 25% in 2025, and 83% in 2027.
- The top 5% (income over $307,900) would receive 43% of the benefit in 2018, 47% in 2025, and 99% in 2027.
- The top 20% (income over $149,400) would receive 65% of the benefit in 2018, 66% in 2025 and all of the benefit in 2027.
- The bottom 80% (income under $149,400) would receive 35% of the benefit in 2018, 34% in 2025 and none of the benefit in 2027, with some groups incurring costs.
- The third quintile (taxpayers in the 40th to 60th percentile with income between $48,600 and $86,100, a proxy for the "middle class") would receive 11% of the benefit in 2018 and 2025, but would incur a net cost in 2027.

The TPC also estimated the amount of the tax cut each group would receive, measured in 2017 dollars:

- Taxpayers in the second quintile (incomes between $25,000 and $48,600, the 20th to 40th percentile) would receive a tax cut averaging $380 in 2018 and $390 in 2025, but a tax increase averaging $40 in 2027.
- Taxpayers in the third quintile (incomes between $48,600 and $86,100, the 40th to 60th percentile) would receive a tax cut averaging $930 in 2018, $910 in 2025, but a tax increase of $20 in 2027.
- Taxpayers in the fourth quintile (incomes between $86,100 and $149,400, the 60th to 80th percentile) would receive a tax cut averaging $1,810 in 2018, $1,680 in 2025, and $30 in 2027.
- Taxpayers in the top 1% (income over $732,800) would receive a tax cut of $51,140 in 2018, $61,090 in 2025, and $20,660 in 2027.

Bloomberg News reported in January 2020 that the top six American banks saved more than $32 billion in taxes during the two years after enactment of the tax cut, while they reduced lending, cut jobs and increased distributions to shareholders.

Following the tax reforms, the average rate of tax for America's richest 400 billionaires dropped to 20%, a lower tax rate than Americans at the median income level.

=== Effects on corporate taxation and behavior ===
The Institute on Taxation and Economic Policy (ITEP) reported in December 2019 that:

- The Tax Act lowered the statutory corporate tax rate from 35% to 21% in 2018, although corporations continued to reduce their taxes below the statutory rate via loopholes. The Tax Act closed some old loopholes, but created new ones.
- The effective corporate tax rate (i.e., taxes paid as a percentage of taxable income) in 2018 was the lowest rate in 40 years, at 11.3%, versus 21.2% on average for the 2008–2015 period.
- Of 379 profitable Fortune 500 corporations in the ITEP study, 91 paid no corporate income taxes and another 56 paid an average effective tax rate of 2.2%.
- If the 379 businesses had instead paid the 21% tax rate, it would have generated an additional $74 billion in tax revenue.

The Economic Policy Institute reported in December 2019 that:

- Working people saw no discernible wage increase due to the Tax Act. The tight labor market and higher state-level minimum wages can explain the wage growth in 2018.
- The Tax Act has not increased business investment, with the small increase in 2018 a "natural bounceback" from a weak 2015–2016, and a sizable decline in 2019.
- Companies used much of the tax benefit for stock buybacks, to the tune of $580 billion in 2018, an increase of 50% from 2017.

=== Taxation through tariffs ===
President Trump increased tariffs significantly as part of his trade policies. CBO reported that "Customs Duties" (which includes tariff revenues) increased from $34.6 billion in 2017, to $41.3 billion in 2018 and $70.8 billion in 2019, reducing deficits accordingly. Reuters reported that: "Tariffs are a tax on imports. They are paid by U.S.-registered firms to U.S. customs for the goods they import into the United States. Importers often pass the costs of tariffs on to customers – manufacturers and consumers in the United States – by raising their prices." President Trump falsely claimed in August 2018 that "because of tariffs we will be able to start paying down large amounts of the $21 trillion in debt that has been accumulated...while at the same time reducing taxes for our people." The tariff revenue is very small relative to the debt, and tariffs are taxes on Americans.

=== Criticism ===
A FiveThirtyEight average of November 2017 surveys showed that 32% of voters approved of the legislation while 46% opposed it. This made the 2017 tax plan less popular than any tax proposal since 1981, including the tax increases of 1990 and 1993. Trump has claimed the tax cuts on the wealthy and corporations would be "paid for by growth", although 37 economists polled by the University of Chicago unanimously rejected the claim. The Washington Posts fact-checker has found that Trump's claims that his economic proposal and tax plan would not benefit wealthy persons like himself are provably false. The elimination of the estate tax (which only applies to inherited wealth greater than $11 million for a married couple) benefits only the heirs of the very rich (such as Trump's children), and there is a reduced tax rate for people who report business income on their individual returns (as Trump does). If Trump's tax plan had been in place in 2005 (the one recent year in which his tax returns were leaked), he would have saved $31 million in taxes from the alternative minimum tax cut alone. If the most recent estimate of the value of Trump's assets is correct, the repeal of the estate tax could save his family about $1.1 billion.

Treasury Secretary Steven Mnuchin argued that the corporate income tax cut will benefit workers the most; however, the nonpartisan Joint Committee on Taxation and Congressional Budget Office estimate that owners of capital benefit vastly more than workers.

Economist Paul Krugman summarized what he called ten lies modern Republicans and conservatives tell about their tax plans, many of which have been deployed in this case: "But the selling of tax cuts under Trump has taken things to a whole new level, both in terms of the brazenness of the lies and their sheer number." These range from "America is the most highly taxed country in the world" (the OECD reported the U.S. is in fact one of the lowest-taxed in the OECD) to "Cutting [corporate] profits taxes really benefits workers" (corporate tax cuts mainly benefit wealthy stockholders) to "Tax cuts won't increase the deficit" (they significantly increase the deficit). Krugman referred to a Tax Policy Center estimate that by 2027, the majority of the tax cut would go to the top 1%; but only 12% to the middle class.

Economist and former Treasury Secretary Larry Summers referred to the analysis provided by the Trump administration of its tax proposal as "... some combination of dishonest, incompetent, and absurd." Summers continued that "... there is no peer-reviewed support for [the Administration's] central claim that cutting the corporate tax rate from 35 percent to 20 percent would raise wages by $4,000 per worker. The claim is absurd on its face."

On the day Trump signed the tax bill, polls showed that 30% of Americans approved of the new law. While its popularity has increased somewhat since, through August 2018 a plurality of Americans still dislike the law.

Despite every independent economic analysis concluding that the tax cut would increase deficits, a June 2018 survey found that 22% of Republicans agreed with that conclusion, while nearly 70% of Democrats agreed.

== Federal budget deficit and debt 2017–2019 ==
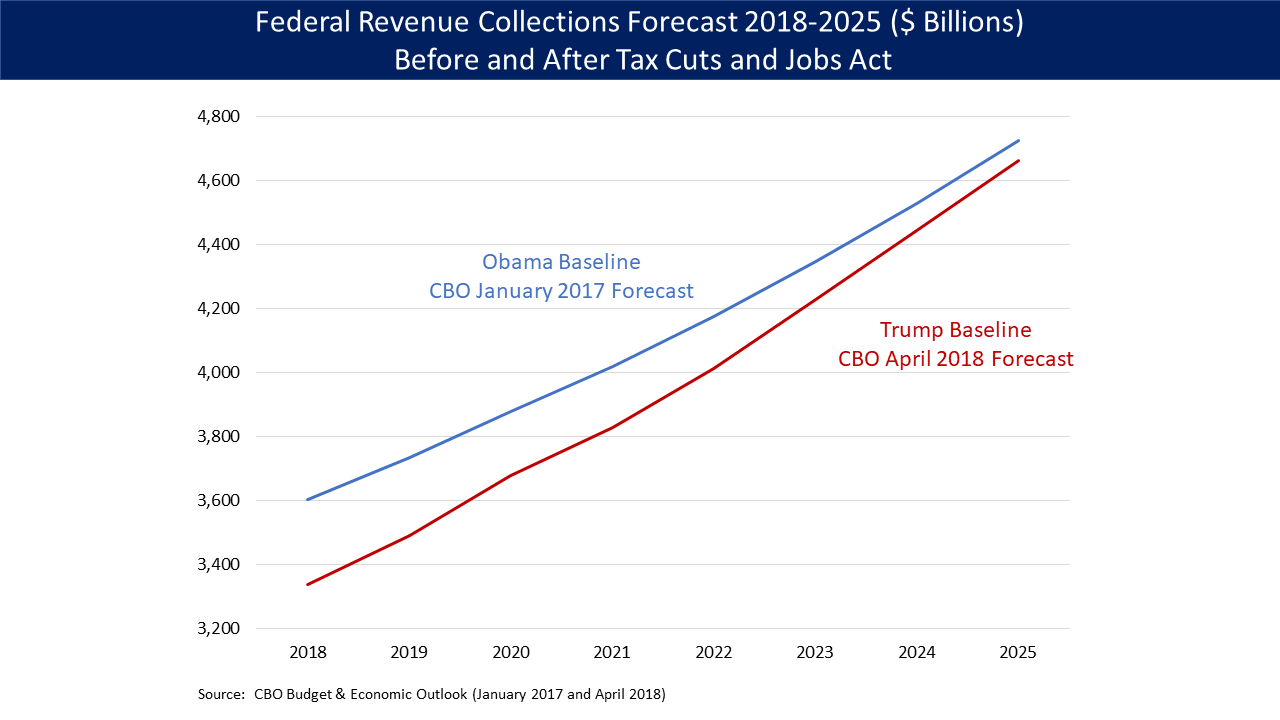
Comparison of U.S. federal revenues for two CBO forecasts, one from January 2017 (based on laws at the end of the Obama Administration) and the other from April 2018, which reflects Trump's policy changes. Key insights include: 1) Tax cuts reduce revenue collections relative to a baseline without them; 2) Tax revenues rise each year under both forecasts as the economy grows; and 3) The gap is larger initially, indicating larger stimulus effects in the earlier years.

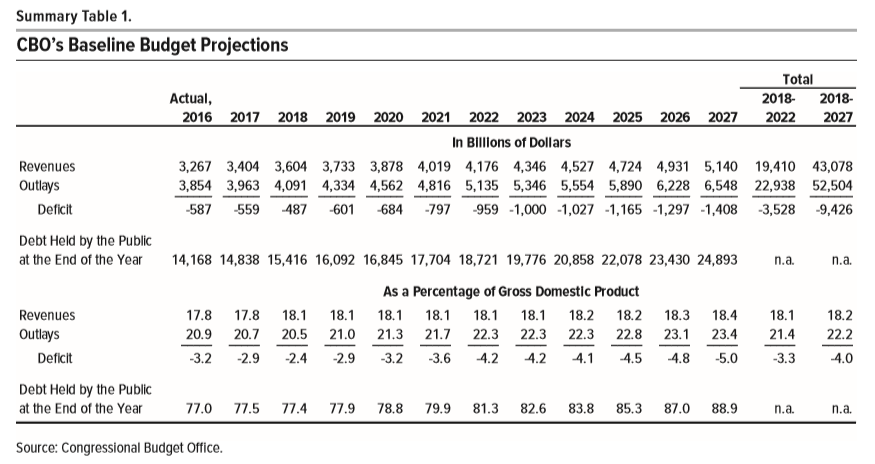
CBO current law baseline as of January 2017, showing forecast of deficit and debt by year. The sum of deficits forecast from 2018 to 2027 was $9.4 trillion. This is the baseline prior to any changes by President Trump. It is the financial position he "inherited" from President Obama.

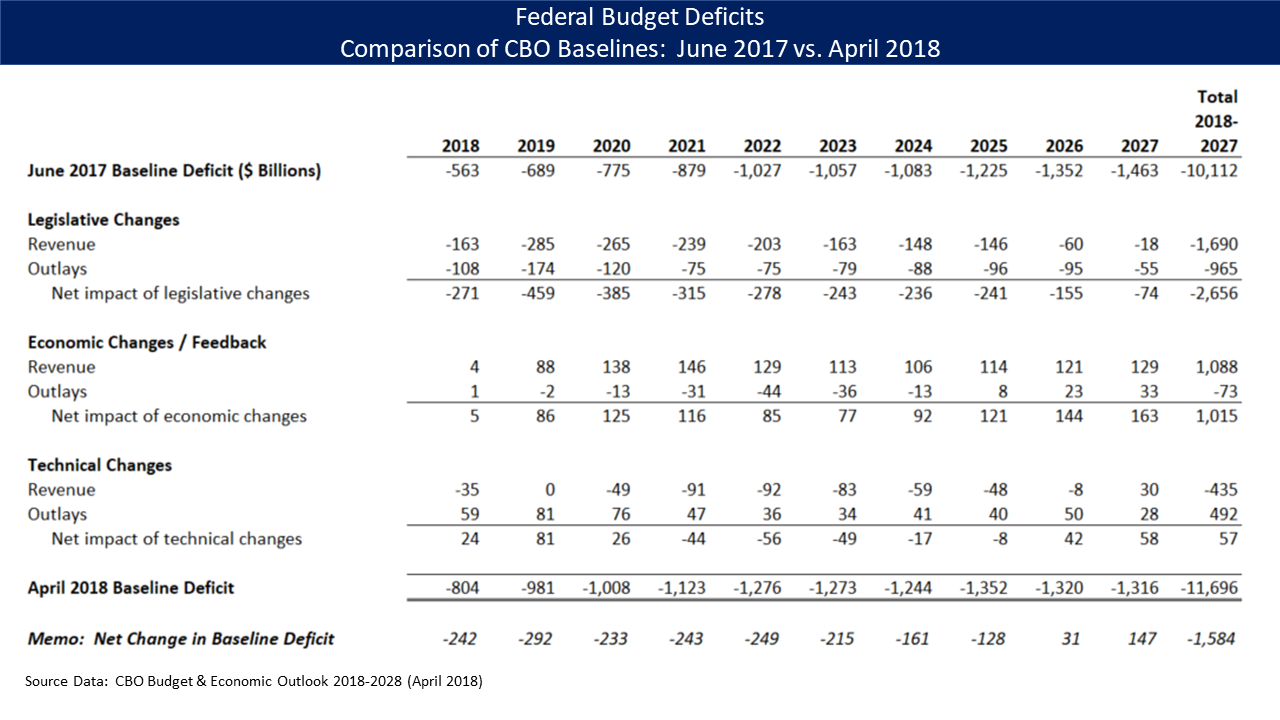
The CBO April 2018 baseline for the 2018–2027 period includes a $1.6 trillion higher debt (sum of deficits) projection than the June 2017 baseline and $2.3 trillion higher than the January 2017 baseline. This is due to the 2017 Tax Act and other spending legislation. The effect from the legislation is partially offset by economic feedback and technical changes.

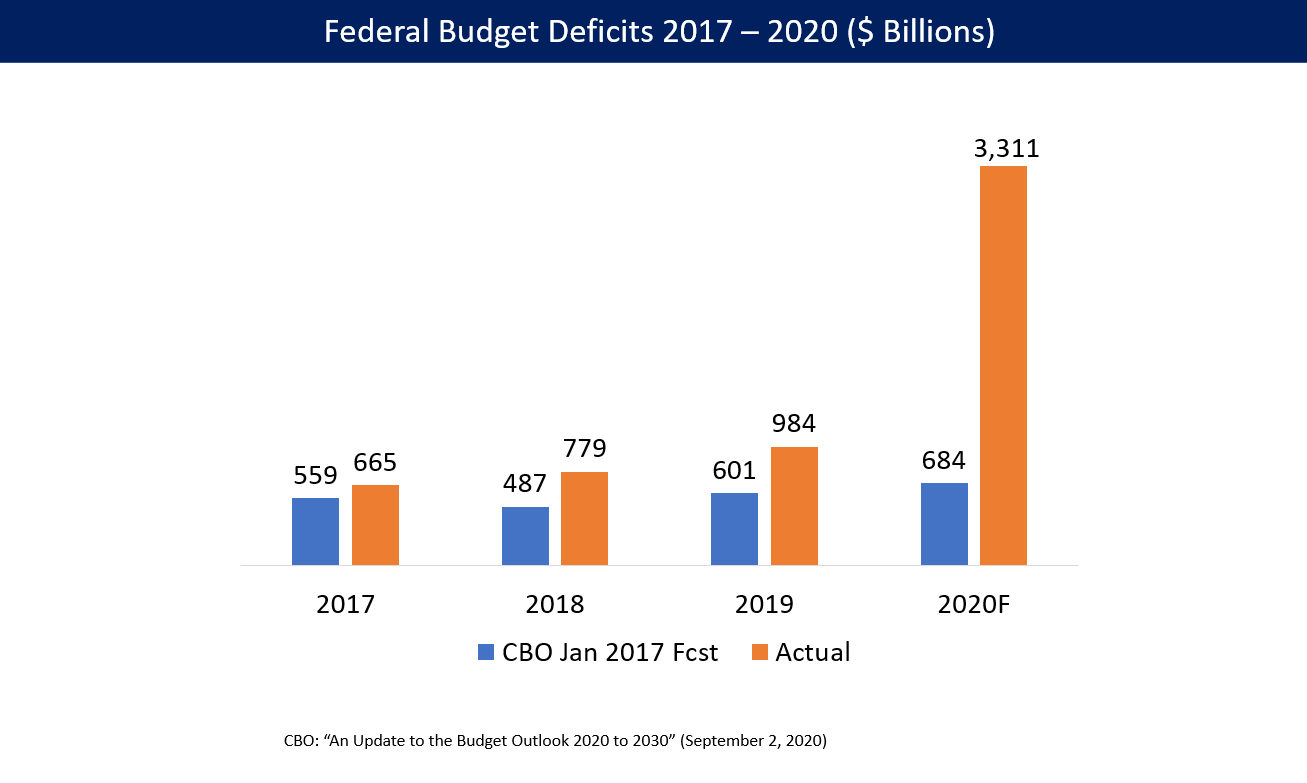
Federal budget deficit CBO baseline forecast from January 2017 assuming continuation of Obama policy, versus actual for fiscal years 2017–2020. The significant deficit increases for 2018 and 2019 were due to the Tax Cuts and Jobs Act and other spending legislation, while 2020 also included relief/stimulus legislation due to coronavirus.

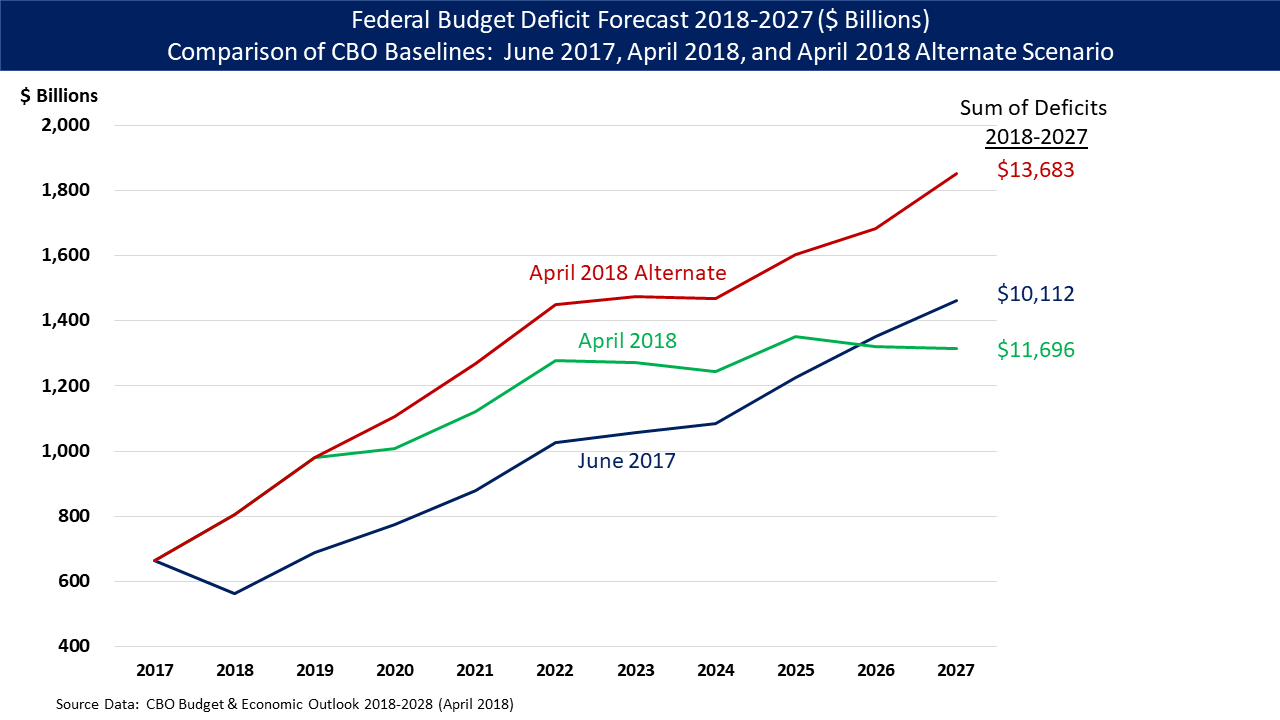
Congressional Budget Office (CBO) baseline scenario comparisons: June 2017 ($10.1 trillion debt increase over a decade), April 2018 ($11.7 trillion, which reflects Trump's tax cuts and spending bills), and April 2018 alternate scenario ($13.7 trillion, which assumes extension of the Trump tax cuts, among other current policy extensions).

=== Summary ===
President Trump's policies have significantly increased the budget deficits and U.S. debt trajectory over the 2017–2027 time periods.

- Fiscal year 2018 (FY 2018) ran from October 1, 2017, through September 30, 2018. It was the first fiscal year budgeted by President Trump. The Treasury department reported on October 15, 2018, that the budget deficit rose from $666 billion in FY2017 to $779 billion in FY2018, an increase of $113 billion or 17.0%. Corporate tax receipts fell by 31%, accounting for most of the deficit increase. Compared with 2017, tax receipts fell by 0.8% GDP, while outlays fell by 0.4% GDP. The 2018 deficit was an estimated 3.9% of GDP, up from 3.5% GDP in 2017.
- The FY2018 deficit increased about 60% from the $487 billion level forecast by CBO in January 2017, just prior to Trump's inauguration. The deficit increase relative to this forecast was due to Trump's tax cuts and additional spending. CBO forecast in January 2017 that tax revenues in fiscal year 2018 would be $3.60 trillion if laws in place as of January 2017 continued. However, actual 2018 revenues were $3.33 trillion, a shortfall of $270 billion (7.5%) relative to the forecast. This difference is primarily due to the Tax Act. In other words, revenues would have been considerably higher in the absence of the tax cuts.
- The debt additions projected by CBO for the 2017–2027 period have increased from the $10.0 trillion that Trump inherited from Obama (January 2017 CBO baseline) to $13.7 trillion (CBO January 2019 current policy baseline), a $3.7 trillion or 37% increase.

As a presidential candidate, Trump pledged to eliminate $19 trillion in federal debt in eight years. Trump and his economic advisers initially pledged to radically decrease federal spending in order to reduce the country's budget deficit. A first estimate of $10.5 trillion in spending cuts over 10 years was reported on January 19, 2017, although cuts of this size did not appear in Trump's 2018 budget. However, the CBO forecast in the April 2018 baseline for the 2018–2027 period includes much larger annual deficits than the January 2017 baseline he inherited from President Obama, due to the Tax Cuts and Jobs Act and other spending bills.

Wells Fargo Economics reported in May 2018 that: "Despite stronger predicted economic growth in the short term, a combination of tax cuts and surging spending have led the budget deficit to widen as a share of GDP, with more deterioration expected over the next year or two. This pattern is historically unusual, as budget deficits typically expand during recession, gradually close during the recoveries and then begin widening again at the next onset of economic weakness."

The New York Times reported in August 2019 that: "The increasing levels of red ink stem from a steep falloff in federal revenue after Mr. Trump's 2017 tax cuts, which lowered individual and corporate tax rates, resulting in far fewer tax dollars flowing to the Treasury Department. Tax revenues for 2018 and 2019 have fallen more than $430 billion short of what the budget office predicted they would be in June 2017, before the tax law was approved that December."

The Committee for a Responsible Federal Budget estimated in January 2020 that President Trump had signed $4.2 trillion of additional debt into law for the 2017–2026 decade, and $4.7 trillion for 2017–2029. This is on top of the $17.2 trillion debt held by the public and the $9.2 trillion already expected to be added to the debt excluding these proposals. About half was the Tax Act, and the other half was spending increases. This analysis assumed the individual tax cuts expire as scheduled after 2025; if extended, up to another $1 trillion could be added through 2029. The Bipartisan Budget Act of 2018 and Bipartisan Budget Act of 2019 added $2.2 trillion to the projected debt, mainly by increasing defense and non-defense discretionary spending caps through 2017–2021. There are no such caps after 2021. A December 2019 spending deal added another $500 billion (~$620 billion in 2025) of debt through additional tax cuts, repealing 3 taxes meant to fund the Affordable Care Act, including the so-called "Cadillac tax" on unusually generous health plans.

=== CBO baseline projections ===
The CBO publishes a 10-year economic and budgetary forecast ("baseline") annually as part of their "Budget and Economic Outlook" report. Comparing baselines provides insight into the impact of policies on the deficit. The January 2017 "current law" baseline assumed the implementation of laws already on the books from the Obama Administration (i.e., laws in place just prior to Trump's inauguration would continue or expire as scheduled). All of the figures in the January 2017 baseline shown in the table below were forecasts at the time. The January 2019 "current policy" or "alternative" baseline reflected Trump's policies along with various assumptions, including the extension of individual tax cuts scheduled to expire after 2025. The 2018 and 2019 actual budget deficits were about 60% above the January 2017 baseline, while the sum of the 2017–2027 deficits in the January 2019 alternative baseline are 37% higher.

Budget Deficit ($ Billions)	2017	2018	2019	2020F	2021–2027F	Total 2017–2027F
January 2017 Baseline	559	487	601	684	7,654	9,984
January 2019 Alt Baseline	665	779	984	1,021	10,263	13,712
Increase	106	292	383	337	2,610	3,728
% Increase	19%	60%	64%	49%	34%	37%

The January 2017 baseline projected that "debt held by the public" would increase from $14.2 trillion in 2016 to $24.9 trillion by 2027, an increase of $10.7 trillion. Debt held by the public would reach 88.9% GDP in 2027. Three years later, the 2027 estimate was 92.6% of GDP.

CBO also estimated that if policies in place as of the end of the Obama administration continued over the following decade (i.e., the January 2017 10-year forecast or baseline), real GDP would grow at approximately 2% per year, the unemployment rate would remain around 5%, inflation would remain around 2%, and interest rates would rise moderately. This forecast assumed the U.S. was very close to full employment by the time President Trump took office and that deficits would fall through 2018. With the notable exception of deficits, actual results for 2017–2019 for these key variables compare favorably against the baseline, as the Tax Cuts and Jobs Act provided a stimulus and the economy was further from full employment than CBO anticipated:

- Real GDP growth averaged 2.5%, versus the 1.9% forecast.
- Job creation averaged 193,000 per month, versus the 92,000 forecast, a three-year total of 7.0 million versus 3.3 million forecast.
- The unemployment rate averaged 4.0%, versus the 4.5% forecast.
- Inflation averaged 2.1%, versus the 2.3% forecast.
- Budget deficits totaled $780 billion more than forecast, with the 2018 and 2019 deficits up 60% versus forecast.

=== CBO scoring of the 2018 budget ===
A budget document is a statement of goals and priorities, but requires separate legislation to achieve them. As of January 2018, the Tax Cuts and Jobs Act was the primary legislation passed that moved the budget closer to the priorities set by Trump.

Trump released his first budget, for FY2018, on May 23, 2017. It proposed unprecedented spending reductions across most of the federal government, totaling $4.5 trillion over ten years, including a 33% cut for the State Department, 31% for the EPA, 21% each for the Agriculture Department and Labor Department, and 18% for the Department of Health and Human Services, with single-digit increases for the Department of Veterans Affairs, Department of Homeland Security and the Defense Department. The Republican-controlled Congress promptly rejected the proposal. Instead, Congress pursued an alternative FY2018 budget linked to their tax reform agenda; this budget was adopted in late 2017, after the 2018 fiscal year had begun. The budget agreement included a resolution specifically providing for $1.5 trillion in new budget deficits over ten years to accommodate the Tax Cuts and Jobs Act that would be enacted weeks later.

The Congressional Budget Office reported its evaluation of President Trump's FY2018 budget on July 13, 2017, including its effects over the 2018–2027 period.

- Mandatory spending: The budget cuts mandatory spending by a net $2,033 billion (B) over the 2018–2027 period. This includes reduced spending of $1,891B for healthcare, mainly due to the proposed repeal and replacement of the Affordable Care Act (ACA/Obamacare); $238B in income security ("welfare"); and $100B in reduced subsidies for student loans. This savings would be partially offset by $200B in additional infrastructure investment.
- Discretionary spending: The budget cuts discretionary spending by a net $1,851 billion over the 2018–2027 period. This includes reduced spending of $752 billion for overseas contingency operations (defense spending in Afghanistan and other foreign countries), which is partially offset by other increases in defense spending of $448B, for a net defense cut of $304B. Other discretionary spending (cabinet departments) would be reduced by $1,548B.
- Revenues would be reduced by $1,000B, mainly by repealing the ACA, which had applied higher tax rates to the top 5% of income earners. Trump's budget proposal was not sufficiently specific to score other tax proposals; these were simply described as "deficit neutral" by the Administration.
- Deficits: CBO estimated that based on the policies in place as of the start of the Trump administration, the debt increase over the 2018–2027 period would be $10,112B. If all of President Trump's proposals were implemented, CBO estimated that the sum of the deficits (debt increases) for the 2018–2027 period would be reduced by $3,276B, resulting in $6,836B in total debt added over the period.
- CBO estimated that the debt held by the public, the major subset of the national debt, would rise from $14,168B (77.0% GDP) in 2016 to $22,337B (79.8% GDP) in 2027 under the President's budget, versus 91.2% GDP under the pre-Trump policy baseline.

=== Actual results FY2017 ===
Fiscal year 2017 (FY2017) ran from October 1, 2016, to September 30, 2017; President Trump was inaugurated in January 2017, so he began office in the fourth month of the fiscal year, which was budgeted by President Obama. In FY2017, the actual budget deficit was $666 billion, $80 billion more than FY2016. FY2017 revenues were up $48 billion (1%) vs. FY2016, while spending was up $128 billion (3%). The deficit was $107 billion more than the CBO January 2017 baseline forecast of $559 billion. The deficit increased to 3.5% GDP, up from 3.2% GDP in 2016 and 2.4% GDP in 2015.

=== FY2018 results ===
Fiscal year 2018 (FY 2018) ran from October 1, 2017, through September 30, 2018. It was the first fiscal year budgeted by President Trump. The Treasury department reported on October 15, 2018, that the budget deficit rose from $666 billion in FY2017 to $779 billion in FY2018, an increase of $113 billion or 17.0%. In dollar terms, tax receipts increased 0.4%, while outlays increased 3.2%. Revenue fell from 17.2% GDP in 2017 to 16.4% GDP in 2018, below the 50-year average of 17.4%. Outlays fell from 20.7% GDP in 2017 to 20.3% GDP in 2018, equal to the 50-year average. The 2018 deficit was an estimated 3.9% of GDP, up from 3.5% GDP in 2017.

CBO reported that corporate income tax receipts fell by $92 billion or 31% in 2018, falling from 1.5% GDP to 1.0% GDP, approximately half the 50-year average. This was due to the Tax Cuts and Jobs Act. This accounted for much of the $113 billion (~$142 billion in 2025) deficit increase in 2018.

During January 2017, just prior to President Trump's inauguration, CBO forecast that the FY 2018 budget deficit would be $487 billion if laws in place at that time remained in place. The $779 billion actual result represents a $292 billion or 60% increase versus that forecast. This difference was mainly due to the Tax Cuts and Jobs Act, which took effect in 2018, and other spending legislation.

=== FY2019 budget ===
Trump released his second budget, for FY2019, on February 23, 2018; it also proposed major spending reductions, totaling $3 trillion (~$3.78 trillion in 2025) over ten years, across most of the federal government. This budget was also largely ignored by the Republican-controlled Congress. One month later, Trump signed a $1.3 trillion bipartisan, omnibus spending bill to fund the government through the end of FY2018, hours after he had threatened to veto it. The bill increased both defense and domestic expenditures, and Trump was sharply criticized by his conservative supporters for signing it. Trump then vowed, "I will never sign another bill like this again."

=== FY 2019 results ===
Fiscal year 2019 (FY 2019) ran from October 1, 2018, through September 30, 2019. It was the first fiscal year where Trump's tax cuts were in effect for the entire period. The Treasury Department reported on October 17, 2019, that the budget deficit rose from $778 billion in FY2018 to $984 billion in FY2018, an increase of $205 billion or 26%. In dollar terms, tax receipts increased 4%, while outlays increased 8%. The 2019 deficit was an estimated 4.7% of GDP, up from 3.9% GDP in 2018. This was the highest as a % GDP since 2012 and the fourth consecutive year with an increase.

During January 2017, just prior to President Trump's inauguration, CBO forecast that the FY 2019 budget deficit would be $601 billion if laws in place at that time remained in place. The $984 billion actual result represents a $383 billion or 64% increase versus that forecast. This difference was mainly due to the Tax Cuts and Jobs Act, which took effect in 2018, and other spending legislation.

The New York Times reported in October 2019 that: "In fact, tax revenue for the last two years has fallen more than $400 billion short of what the Congressional Budget Office projected in June 2017, six months before the tax law was passed." The Treasury Department expects the deficit to exceed $1 trillion in FY2020. The budget deficit has increased nearly 50% since Trump took office and has increased for the past four years. This is contrary to Trump's promises to eliminate deficits within 8 years. The 2019 calendar year deficit exceeded $1 trillion.

=== Ten year forecasts 2018–2028 ===
The CBO estimated the impact of Trump's tax cuts and separate spending legislation over the 2018–2028 period in their annual "Budget & Economic Outlook", released in April 2018:

- CBO forecasts a stronger economy over the 2018–2019 periods than do many outside economists, blunting some of the deficit impact of the tax cuts and spending increases.
- Real (inflation-adjusted) GDP, a key measure of economic growth, is expected to increase 3.3% in 2018 and 2.4% in 2019, versus 2.6% in 2017. It is projected to average 1.7% from 2020 to 2026 and 1.8% in 2027–2028. Over 2017–2027, real GDP is expected to grow 2.0% on average under the April 2018 baseline, versus 1.9% under the June 2017 baseline.
- The non-farm employment level would be about 1.1 million higher on average over the 2018–2028 period, about 0.7% level higher than the June 2017 baseline.
- The budget deficit in fiscal 2018 (which runs from October 1, 2017, to September 30, 2018, the first year budgeted by President Trump) is forecast to be $804 billion, an increase of $139 billion (21%) from the $665 billion in 2017 and up $242 billion (39%) over the previous baseline forecast (June 2017) of $580 billion for 2018. The June 2017 forecast was essentially the budget trajectory inherited from President Obama; it was prepared prior to the Tax Act and other spending increases under President Trump.
- For the 2018–2027 period, CBO projects the sum of the annual deficits (i.e., debt increase) to be $11.7 trillion, an increase of $1.6 trillion (16%) over the previous baseline (June 2017) forecast of $10.1 trillion.
- The $1.6 trillion debt increase includes three main elements: 1) $1.7 trillion less in revenues due to the tax cuts; 2) $1.0 trillion more in spending; and 3) Partially offsetting incremental revenue of $1.1 trillion due to higher economic growth than previously forecast. The $1.6 trillion figure is approximately $12,700 per family or $4,900 per person total.
- Debt held by the public is expected to rise from 78% of GDP ($16 trillion) at the end of 2018 to 96% GDP ($29 trillion) by 2028. That would be the highest level since the end of World War Two.
- CBO estimated under an alternative scenario (in which policies in place as of April 2018 are maintained beyond scheduled initiation or expiration) that deficits would be considerably higher, rising by $13.7 trillion over the 2018–2027 period, an increase of $3.6 trillion (36%) over the June 2017 baseline forecast. Maintaining current policies for example would include extending the individual Trump tax cuts past their scheduled expiration in 2025, among other changes. The $3.6 trillion figure is approximately $28,500 per household or $11,000 per person total.

=== Federal corporate income tax receipts ===
During the six months following enactment of the Trump tax cut, year-on-year corporate profits increased 6.4%, while corporate income tax receipts declined 45.2%. This was the sharpest semiannual decline since records began in 1948, with the sole exception of a 57.0% decline during the Great Recession when corporate profits fell 47.3%.

Federal corporate income tax receipts fell from about $297 billion in fiscal year 2017 (prior to the Trump tax cuts) to $205 billion in fiscal year 2018, nearly one-third. This revenue decline occurred despite a growing economy and corporate profits, which ordinarily would cause tax receipts to increase. Corporate tax receipts fell from 1.5% GDP in 2017 to 1.0% GDP in 2018. The pre-Great Recession historical average (1980–2007) was 1.8% GDP.

=== Federal budget shutdown of 2018–2019 ===
On December 22, 2018, the federal government went into a partial shutdown caused by the expiration of funding for nine executive departments. The lapse in funding occurred after Trump demanded that the appropriations bill include funding for a U.S.-Mexico border wall. The shutdown ended on January 25, 2019, with the total shutdown period extending over a month, the longest in American history. By mid-January 2019, the White House Council of Economic Advisors estimated that each week of the shutdown reduced GDP growth by 0.1 percentage points, the equivalent of 1.2 points per quarter. About 380,000 federal employees were furloughed, some public services were shut down, and an additional 420,000 employees for the affected agencies were expected to work with their pay delayed until the end of the shutdown, totaling 800,000 workers affected out of 2.1 million civilian non-postal federal employees.

A January 2019 Congressional Budget Office report estimated that the 35-day partial government shutdown cost the American economy at least $11 billion, including $3 billion in permanent losses; the CBO estimate excluded indirect costs that were difficult to quantify. The shutdown had an adverse effect on the budgets of state and local governments, as states covered some federal services (particularly the most vulnerable) during the shutdown.

== Federal budget deficit 2020– ==
=== Coronavirus and CARES ACT impact on deficit ===
The CBO forecast in April 2020 that the budget deficit in fiscal year 2020 would be $3.7 trillion (17.9% GDP), versus the January estimate of $1 trillion (4.6% GDP). The COVID-19 pandemic in the United States impacted the economy significantly beginning in March 2020, as businesses were shut-down and furloughed or fired personnel. About 20 million persons filed for unemployment insurance in the four weeks ending April 11. It caused the number of unemployed persons to increase significantly, which is expected to reduce tax revenues while increasing automatic stabilizer spending for unemployment insurance and nutritional support. As a result of the adverse economic impact, both state and federal budget deficits will dramatically increase, even before considering any new legislation.

To help address lost income for millions of workers and assist businesses, Congress and President Trump enacted the Coronavirus Aid, Relief, and Economic Security Act (CARES) on March 27, 2020. It included loans and grants for businesses, along with direct payments to individuals and additional funding for unemployment insurance. While the Act carried an estimated $2.3 trillion price tag, some or all of the loans may ultimately be paid back including interest, while the spending measures should dampen the negative budgetary impact of the economic disruption. While the law will almost certainly increase budget deficits relative to the January 2020 10-year CBO baseline (completed prior to the Coronavirus), in the absence of the legislation, a complete economic collapse could have occurred.

CBO provided a preliminary score for the CARES Act on April 16, 2020, estimating that it would increase federal deficits by about $1.8 trillion over the 2020–2030 period. The estimate includes:

- A $988 billion increase in mandatory outlays;
- A $446 billion decrease in revenues; and
- A $326 billion increase in discretionary outlays, stemming from emergency supplemental appropriations.

CBO reported that not all parts of the bill will increase deficits: "Although the act provides financial assistance totaling more than $2 trillion, the projected cost is less than that because some of that assistance is in the form of loan guarantees, which are not estimated to have a net effect on the budget. In particular, the act authorizes the Secretary of the Treasury to provide up to $454 billion to fund emergency lending facilities established by the Board of Governors of the Federal Reserve System. Because the income and costs stemming from that lending are expected to roughly offset each other, CBO estimates no deficit effect from that provision".

The Committee for a Responsible Federal Budget estimated that the budget deficit for fiscal year 2020 would increase to a record $3.8 trillion, or 18.7% GDP. For scale, in 2009 the budget deficit reached 9.8% GDP ($1.4 trillion nominal dollars) in the depths of the Great Recession. CBO forecast in January 2020 that the budget deficit in FY2020 would be $1.0 trillion (~$1.22 billion in 2025), prior to considering the impact of the coronavirus pandemic or CARES.

== Labor market ==
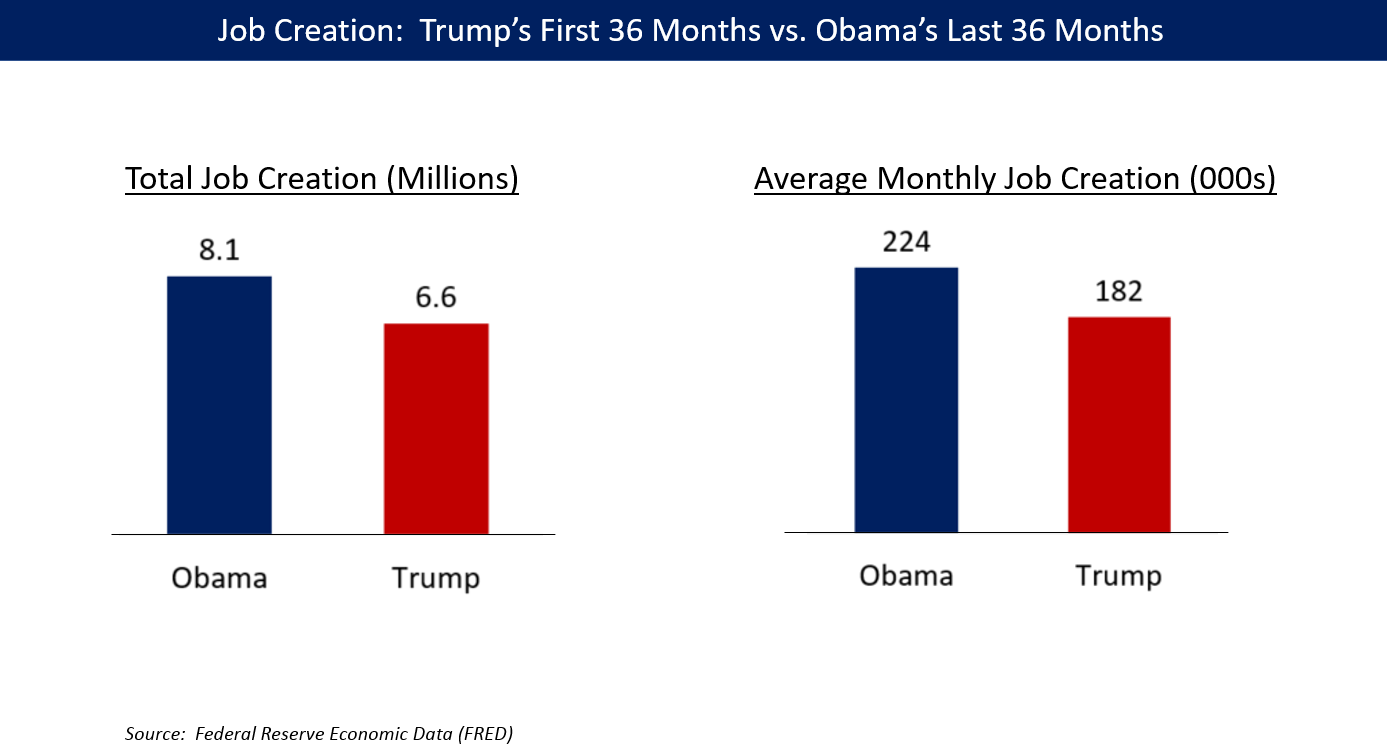
Job creation for Trump's first 36 months (through January 2020) vs. Obama's last 36 months ($1.0 [!]).

=== Jobs and unemployment ===
As a candidate in 2016, Trump promised to create 25 million new jobs over the next decade. However, Trump left office with 3 million fewer jobs in the U.S. than when he took office, making Trump the only U.S. president to leave office with a smaller workforce (since employment statistics began to be kept in 1939). The unemployment rate when Trump took office was 4.7%; when Trump left office, the unemployment rate was 6.3%, which is above the median historical norm (5.6% is the median U.S. unemployment rate for all months since 1948). The unemployment rate at the end of Trump's term would have been higher but for the 3.9 million people who dropped out of the labor force (i.e., stopped looking for a job) between February 2020 and January 2021 (and are thus not counted in the unemployment rate).

Trump inherited a booming labor market, and for the first three years in Trump's term, the number of U.S. jobs continued to grow, although far below Trump's pledges and with an average monthly gain lower than under Obama. Job growth was concentrated in Democratic-leaning counties rather than Republican ones: in the year ending in May 2018, 58.5% of job creation was in counties that Trump did not carry in the 2016 election, similar to the results during the months prior to Trump's presidency. Over 35% of counties Trump carried showed job losses, compared to 19.2% of counties carried by Clinton. The U.S. unemployment rate hit a 50-year low (3.5%) in February 2020, but just two months later hit a 90-year high (14.8%), matching Great Depression levels, due to the severe impact of the COVID-19 pandemic. Unemployment thereafter declined from the peak, and was 6.3% at the end of Trump's term.

The "Misery Index" (the sum of inflation and unemployment rates) reached a record high in summer 2020, following the COVID-19 crisis and ensuing economic recession.

=== Labor force participation ===
The U.S. labor force participation rate in December 2020 (Trump's last full month in office) was 61.5%, which was 1.3 percentage points lower than the labor force participation rate in January 2017, when Trump took office.

=== Wages ===
Trump ran on a campaign to improve wages for the working class, and as president he falsely asserted on several occasions that wages were rising for the first time in as many as 22 years. However, the average real (inflation-adjusted) hourly wage for private sector production and nonsupervisory workers (loosely, "working-class" workers) began steadily rising in November 2012, and that wage growth slowed under Trump compared to prior years, mainly due to increases in energy prices. Trump and Republicans have asserted that the corporate tax cut in the Tax Cuts and Jobs Act would cause employers to pass their tax savings on to workers in the form of wage increases, while critics predicted companies would spend most of the savings on stock repurchases and dividends to shareholders. Early evidence appeared to confirm the latter.

For example, average hourly earnings (for all employees on private nonfarm payrolls) rose from $26.26 in June 2017 to $26.98 in June 2018, an increase of $0.72 or 2.74%. However, inflation (CPI-U, for all items) rose 2.8% for the 12 months ending May 2018, indicating that workers' real (inflation-adjusted) hourly earnings were essentially unchanged over that mid-2017 to mid-2018 period. Real wage growth turned negative in June 2018, as the inflation rate was higher than nominal wage growth, continuing into July.

On September 5, 2018, Trump's top economist Kevin Hassett released new analysis indicating that real wage growth under Trump was higher than previously reported. However, the new analysis also showed that real wage growth under Trump was lower than in 2015 and 2016.

A September 2018 analysis by Reuters found that wage growth over the year ended March 2018 substantially lagged the national average in the 220 counties that flipped from voting for Obama in 2012 to voting for Trump in 2016.

Eighteen states increased their minimum wage effective January 1, 2018 – including California, Florida, New York, New Jersey and Ohio – which the Economic Policy Institute estimated would provide $5 billion (~$6.41 billion in 2025) in additional wages to 4.5 million workers. The average increase over the 18 states was 4.4%.

During his February 2019 State of the Union Address, Trump asserted, "Wages are rising at the fastest pace in decades, and growing for blue collar workers, who I promised to fight for, faster than anyone else." Nominal wage growth for production and nonsupervisory workers averaged 3.0% during 2018, the highest rate since 2009. Adjusted for inflation, the 2018 average growth rate for such workers was 0.5%, the highest rate since 2016, when real wages rose 1.2%. However, real wage growth was lower during both of Trump's first two years in office than during the preceding four years.

Average hourly earnings increased from 2015–2016 to 2017–2018 in nominal terms, but since inflation was higher in the latter period, real earnings growth was lower. For example, average hourly earnings growth rates for production and non-supervisory workers (a proxy for middle-class workers) increased in nominal terms from 2.3% for the 2015–2016 period, to 2.6% for the 2017–2018 period. However, in real (inflation-adjusted) terms, the growth rate was faster at 1.6% in 2015–2016 versus the 0.3% in 2017–2018, as inflation was higher in the latter period. For all employees, which includes higher wage managers, the pattern is similar, with faster nominal growth in 2017–2018 at 2.7% versus 2015–2016 at 2.4%, but slower real growth in 2017–2018 at 0.4% vs. 1.7% in 2015–2016.

The following table summarizes real (inflation-adjusted) wage growth for "All Employees" and "Production and Non-supervisory Employees." The latter group excludes higher-paid managerial employees and is referred to as "blue collar" workers by President Trump. The data is listed by year and grouped for the last three years of the Obama Administration (2014–2016) and the first three years of the Trump Administration (2017–2019). In 2014 and 2019, blue collar employees had faster real wage gains than "All employees." For both groups of employees, real wage growth averaged 1.3% under Obama for 2014–2016 and 0.8% under Trump during 2017–2019.

Real Wage Growth (YOY Avg. % Chg)	2014	2015	2016	2017	2018	2019	Avg 2014–2016 Obama	Avg 2017–2019 Trump
All Employees	0.4	2.1	1.3	0.4	0.6	1.5	1.3	0.8
Prod & Non-Supervisory	0.7	2.0	1.2	0.2	0.5	1.7	1.3	0.8

== Economic growth ==
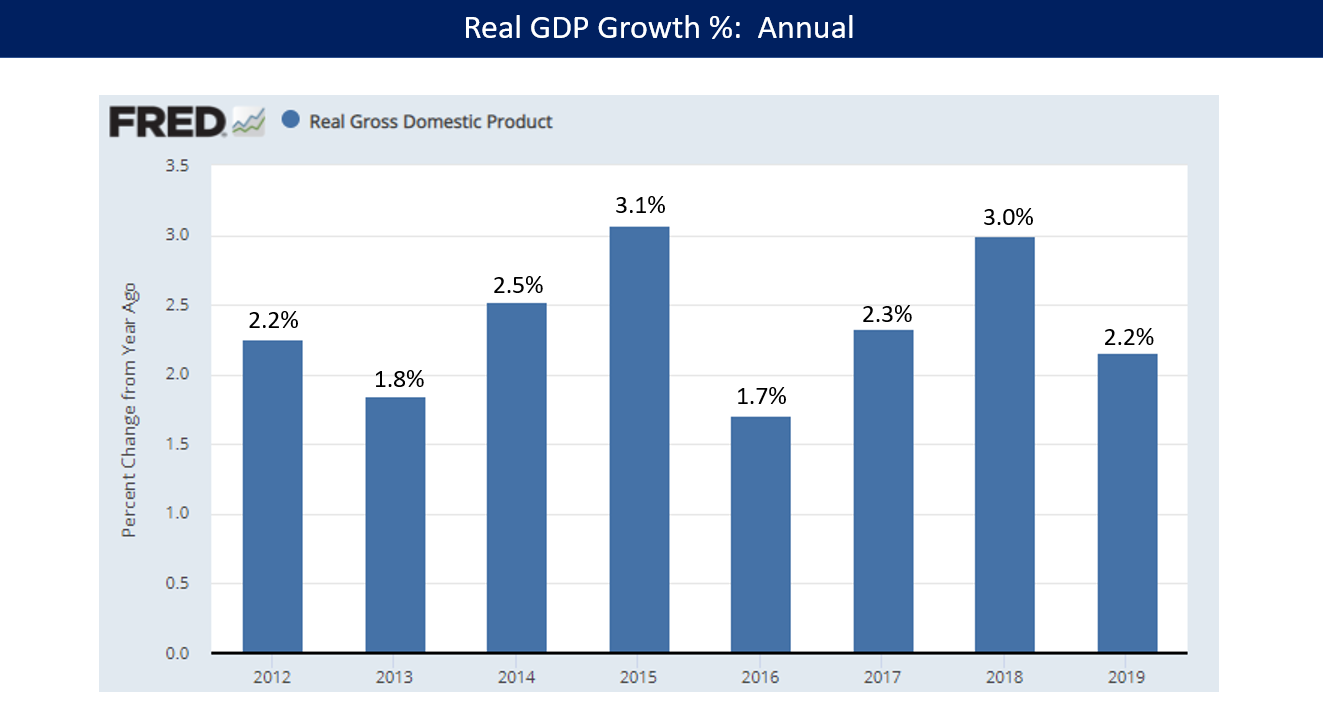
U.S. real GDP growth for full year 2012–2019. Growth averaged 2.4% in Obama's last 3 years versus 2.7% in Trump's first 3 years.

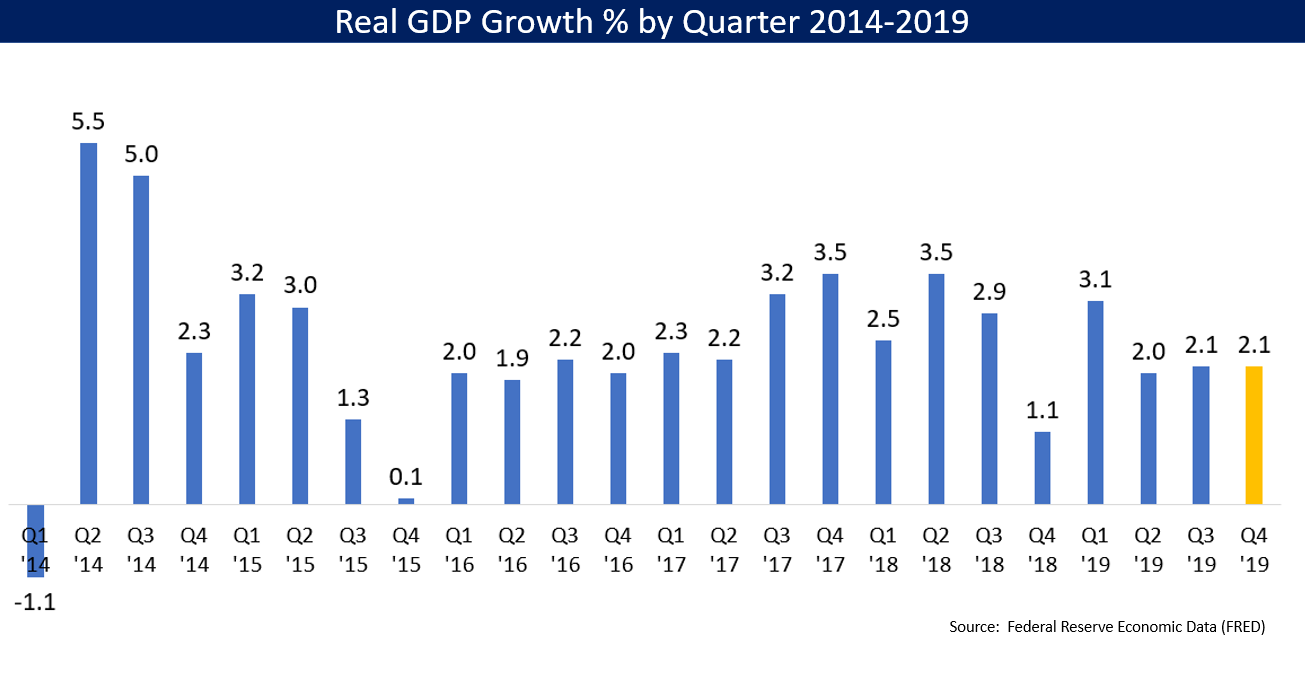
U.S. real GDP quarterly growth from 2014 to 2019.

U.S. real GDP growth under Trump was substantially below that achieved by other presidents. Trump presided over the slowest economic growth of any U.S. president since the Second World War, partly due to the COVID-19 pandemic that triggered a brief recession and a 2.2% decline in real GDP growth in his last year. Prior to the pandemic, real GDP growth averaged 2.7% during the first three years of the Trump presidency.

In the first three years of the Trump administration, U.S. GDP growth was 2.3% (2017), 3.0% (2018) and 2.2% (2019), a middling record among recent U.S. presidents. Growth in Trump's peak year, 3.0%, was surpassed in 17 of the preceding 39 years under presidents from Reagan to Obama. In 2020, U.S. GDP shrunk by 3.5%, an economic contraction caused by the devastation of the COVID-19 pandemic, making 2020 the worst year for economic growth since 1946 (when the U.S. was demobilizing from World War II) and the first year that the U.S. had an annual decrease in GDP since 2009 (when the U.S. suffered from the Great Recession). The U.S. GDP decline in the second quarter of 2020 was the sharpest ever quarterly decline experienced by the U.S.; the third quarter of 2020 had a resurgence in growth due to economic reopenings; and the fourth quarter of 2020 had 1% GDP growth, a sluggish rate indicative of a faltering recovery.

Real GDP per capita increased from $55,790 in 2017 to $57,158 in 2018 to $58,113 in 2019, continuing to set a new record each year (as the U.S. had done since 2010); however real GDP per capita declined to $55,790 in 2020.

In 2019, amid concerns about a possible future U.S. recession, caused in part by global uncertainty due to Trump's trade policies, Trump demanded that the Federal Reserve lower interest rates and publicly considering payroll and capital gains tax cuts, as additional stimulus measures, although these were not enacted. Trump claimed in 2017 that GDP growth could reach 6% annually if his tax cuts were passed, a claim that economics identified as highly unrealistic.

Throughout his tenure, Trump falsely claimed that the economy under his administration was "the greatest economy in the history of our country" and made various inflated and inaccurate claims about the state of the U.S. economy and its rate of growth, including the false claim that GDP had "doubled and tripled" under his tenure. Trump repeated some version of the false claim "The U.S. economy has never been stronger" some 493 times during his presidency, making it his most-often repeated false claim.

== Infrastructure, inflation, and energy ==
=== Infrastructure ===
Within days of taking office, Trump signed presidential memoranda to revive both the Keystone XL and Dakota Access oil pipelines; although Trump touted the projects as job-creating measures, the proposed projects were projected to have only a tiny impact on the U.S. economy.

Trump pledged as a candidate to invest $550 billion in infrastructure and create an infrastructure fund, and in 2018 released a federal infrastructure plan that called for the federal government to contribute $200 billion over ten years, with state and local governments and private industry to contribute the rest. However, Trump failed to advance an infrastructure bill through Congress and did not create a U.S. infrastructure fund. Trump and congressional Republicans did not make passage of a major infrastructure bill a key legislative priority, instead focusing on efforts to pass a tax-cut bill and repeal the Affordable Care Act. Later in his presidency, Trump tentatively agreed with Democratic congressional leadership for a $2 trillion infrastructure package, but in May 2019 the agreement collapsed after Trump accused Democrats of launching "phony investigations" against him. In 2020, Trump made an unsuccessful election-year push for an infrastructure bill; this encountered opposition from Senate Republicans. Federal investments on water infrastructure declined to a 30-year low during Trump's tenure, while federal investments in road and bridge transportation stagnated.

=== Inflation ===
Trends in inflation rates over the 2016–2018 period vary depending on whether volatile food and energy prices are included in the measure:

- Inflation measured by the consumer price index for all items rose from 1.3% in 2016 to 2.1% in 2017 and 2.5% year-to-date (YTD) June 2018. This was mainly driven by higher energy prices.
- Core inflation, which excludes volatile food and energy prices, was relatively flat, at 2.2% in 2016, 1.8% in 2017, and 2.1% YTD June 2018.

=== Energy ===
In May 2018 Trump ordered the Department of Energy to conduct unprecedented intervention in energy markets to protect the coal and nuclear industries from competitive market pressures. Robert Powelson, whom Trump appointed to the Federal Energy Regulatory Commission, testified to the Senate Energy and Natural Resources Committee on June 12, 2018, that "unprecedented steps by the federal government – through the President's recent directive to the Department of Energy to subsidize certain resources – threaten to collapse the wholesale competitive markets that have long been a cornerstone of FERC policy. This intervention could potentially "blow up" the markets and result in significant rate increases without any corresponding reliability, resilience, or cybersecurity benefits."

The Trump administration initiated regulatory relief for the coal mining industry, particularly by moving to repeal the Clean Power Plan (CPP). A 2019 projection by the Energy Information Administration estimated that coal production without CPP would decline over coming decades at a faster rate than indicated in the agency's 2017 projection, which had assumed the CPP was in effect.

Through October 2020, coal-fueled electricity generating capacity declined faster during Trump's presidency than during any previous presidential term, falling 15% with the idling of 145 coal-burning units at 75 power plants. An estimated 20% of electricity was expected to be generated by coal in 2020, compared to 31% in 2017.

== Trade and tariffs ==
=== USMCA ===
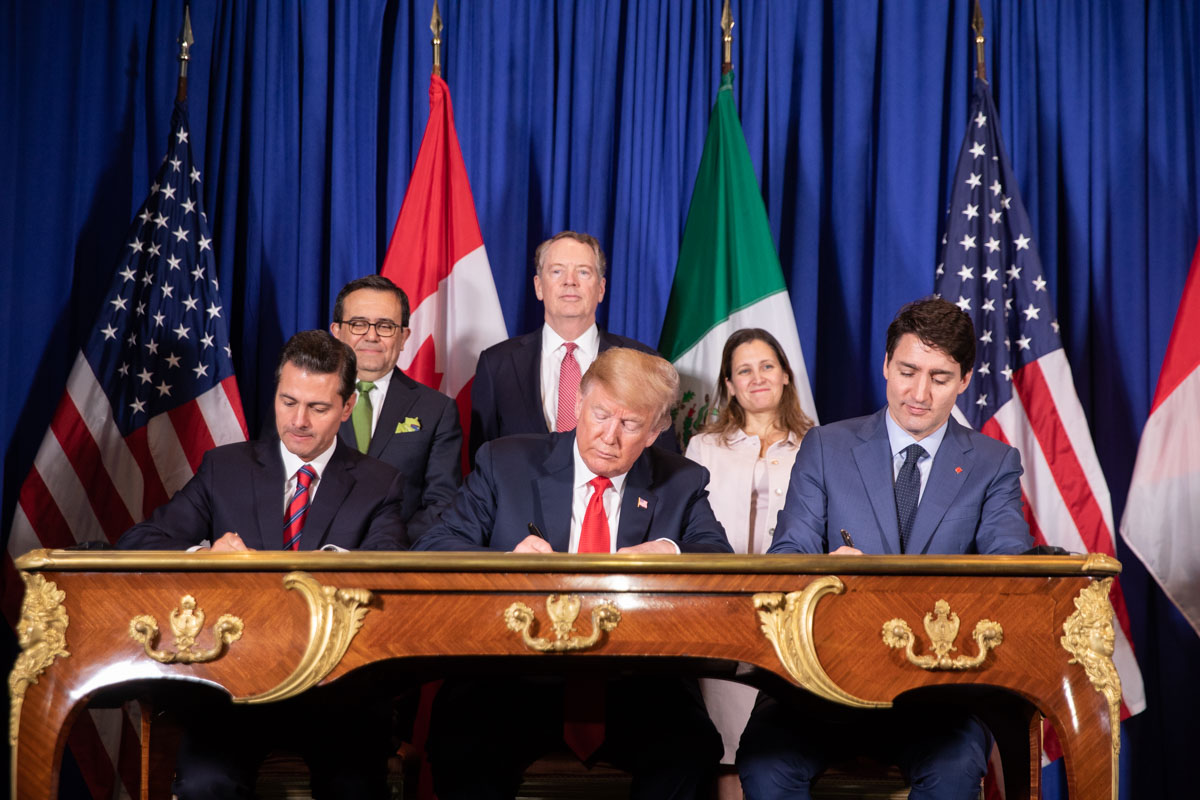
Trump signs the USMCA, alongside Mexican President Enrique Peña Nieto and Canadian Prime Minister Justin Trudeau during the G20 summit in Buenos Aires, November 2018.

Under Trump, the North American Free Trade Agreement (NAFTA), a trilateral agreement between the North American nations, was replaced by the United States–Mexico–Canada Agreement (USMCA). The new agreement entered into effect on July 1, 2020, after two years of negotiations and a ratification process.

USMCA is very similar to NAFTA, carrying over many of the same provisions and making only modest, mostly cosmetic changes. The expected economic impact is very small. An International Monetary Fund (IMF) working paper issued in late March 2019 found that the agreement would have "negligible" effects on the broad economy. An April 2019 International Trade Commission analysis on the likely impact of the USMCA estimated that the agreement, when fully implemented (six years following ratification) would increase U.S. real GDP by 0.35% and would increase U.S. total employment by 0.12% (176,000 jobs). The analysis cited by another study from the Congressional Research Service found the agreement would not have a measurable effect on jobs, wages, or overall economic growth.

=== Trans-Pacific partnership ===
The Trans-Pacific Partnership (TPP) was a proposed trade agreement between 12 Pacific Rim countries: Australia, Brunei, Canada, Chile, Japan, Malaysia, Mexico, New Zealand, Peru, Singapore, Vietnam, and the United States. The agreement aimed to lower both non-tariff and tariff barriers to trade, establish an investor-state dispute settlement mechanism, and promote economic growth, job creation, innovation, and higher living standards. The TPP was meant to create economic competition to a rising China however it was also criticized as an opportunity for China to expand its influence in Asia.

At the November 10, 2015, Republican debate, Trump stated that the TPP was "a deal that was designed for China to come in, as they always do, through the back door and totally take advantage of everyone." Politifact rated this assertion "Pants On Fire," while the conservative Wall Street Journal editorial board wrote, "It wasn't obvious that [Trump] has any idea what's in [TPP]". Trump stated similar rhetoric about TPP on June 26, 2016, which the Washington Post factchecker found to be incorrect.

The TPP was signed on February 4, 2016, but it never came into force because Trump withdrew from the agreement in January 2017 during his first week in office through an executive order. This decision was a component of his "America First" strategy and signaled a change from long-term Republican orthodoxy, that expanding global trade was good for America and the world. However, on April 13, 2018, Trump said the United States could rejoin the TPP.

TPP, renegotiated and renamed as the Comprehensive and Progressive Agreement for Trans-Pacific Partnership (CPTPP) after the U.S. withdrawal, became effective on December 30, 2018. Investment bank HSBC noted that 90% of tariffs on goods were immediately eliminated by the six countries that had already ratified the agreement. The other five countries were expected to ratify the agreement within months. U.S. Wheat Associates President Vince Peterson had said earlier in December that American wheat exporters could face an "imminent collapse" in their 53% market share in Japan. Peterson added, "Our competitors in Australia and Canada will now benefit from those [CPTPP] provisions, as US farmers watch helplessly." The National Cattlemen's Beef Association stated that exports of beef to Japan, America's largest export market, would be at a serious disadvantage to Australian exporters as their tariffs on exports to Japan would be cut by 27.5% during the first year of CPTPP. The Trump administration later sought a unilateral trade agreement with Japan that would increase American agricultural exports, but in April 2019 Japan rejected greater access to its markets.

=== Trade war with China ===
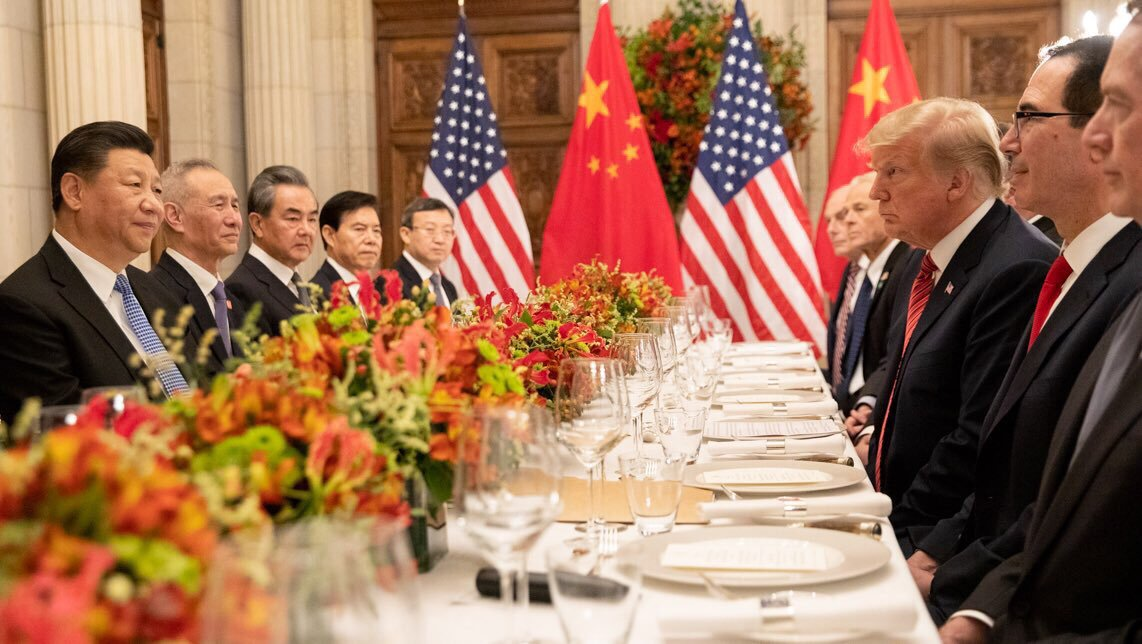
Talks between U.S. delegation headed by Trump and Chinese delegation headed by Xi at the G20 summit in Buenos Aires, December 2018

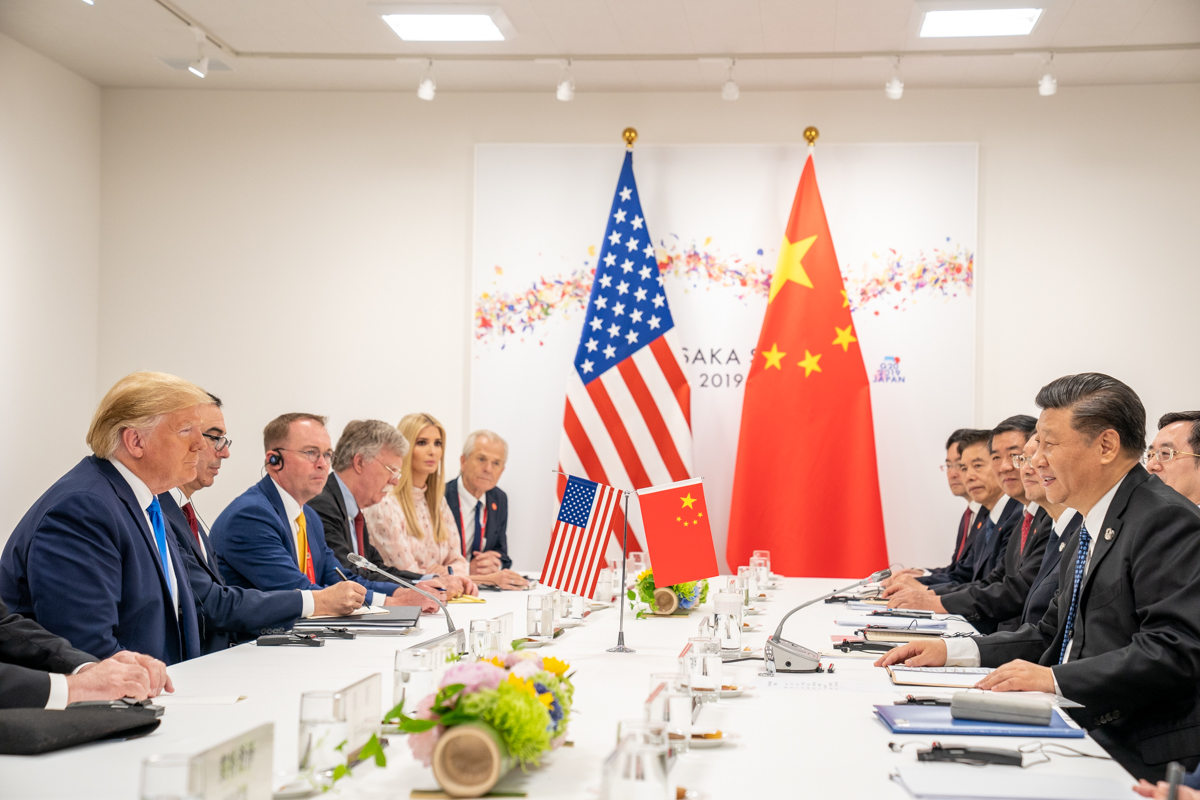
Talks between U.S. delegation headed by Trump and Chinese delegation headed by Xi at the G20 summit in Osaka, June 2019

In January 2020, CBO summarized the trade war with China from 2018 to just prior to the China "Phase One" Trade Deal: "In January 2018, the United States started imposing new trade barriers. As of January 7, 2020, the United States had imposed tariffs on 16.8 percent of goods imported into the country, measured as a share of the value of all U.S. imports in 2017. Some of those tariffs apply to imports from nearly all U.S. trading partners, including tariffs on washing machines, solar panels, and steel and aluminum products. A few countries are exempted from certain tariffs. For example, Canadian and Mexican imports were granted exemptions from the tariffs on steel and aluminum products. Other tariffs affected only imports from China, covering about half of U.S. imports from China and targeting intermediate goods (items used for the production of other goods and services), capital goods (such as computers and other equipment), and some consumer goods (such as apparel and footwear). In response to the tariffs, U.S. trading partners have retaliated by imposing their own trade barriers. As of January 7, 2020, retaliatory tariffs had been imposed on 9.3 percent of all goods exported by the United States— primarily industrial supplies and materials as well as agricultural products." As of January 7, 2020, tariffs were in-effect for $395 billion of U.S. imports and $143 billion of U.S exports (in retaliation); nearly all of this balance relates to China.

Further, China devalued its currency (Yuan) by about 12% from the beginning of 2018 to the end of 2019, making its exports more competitive, to help offset the impact on its economy from the tariffs. By August 2019, the exchange rate was the lowest in 11 years. The U.S. responded by declaring China a "currency manipulator" on August 5, 2019 although this designation was later rescinded in January 2020 as part of the Phase 1 trade deal.

The following table summarizes trends in imports, exports, and trade balance (a negative indicating a trade deficit) in goods only with China. After increasing in 2017 and 2018, the goods trade deficit shrank in 2019 due to Trump's trade policies, with a decline in imports larger than the decline in exports. Since the overall trade deficit across all countries was little changed, this indicates importers found other foreign sources besides China.

Trade balance with China ($ Billions)	2016	2017	2018	2019
Exports (X)	116	130	120	106
Imports (M)	462	505	540	452
Balance (X-M)	−347	−375	−420	−346

=== Phase-one trade deal with China ===
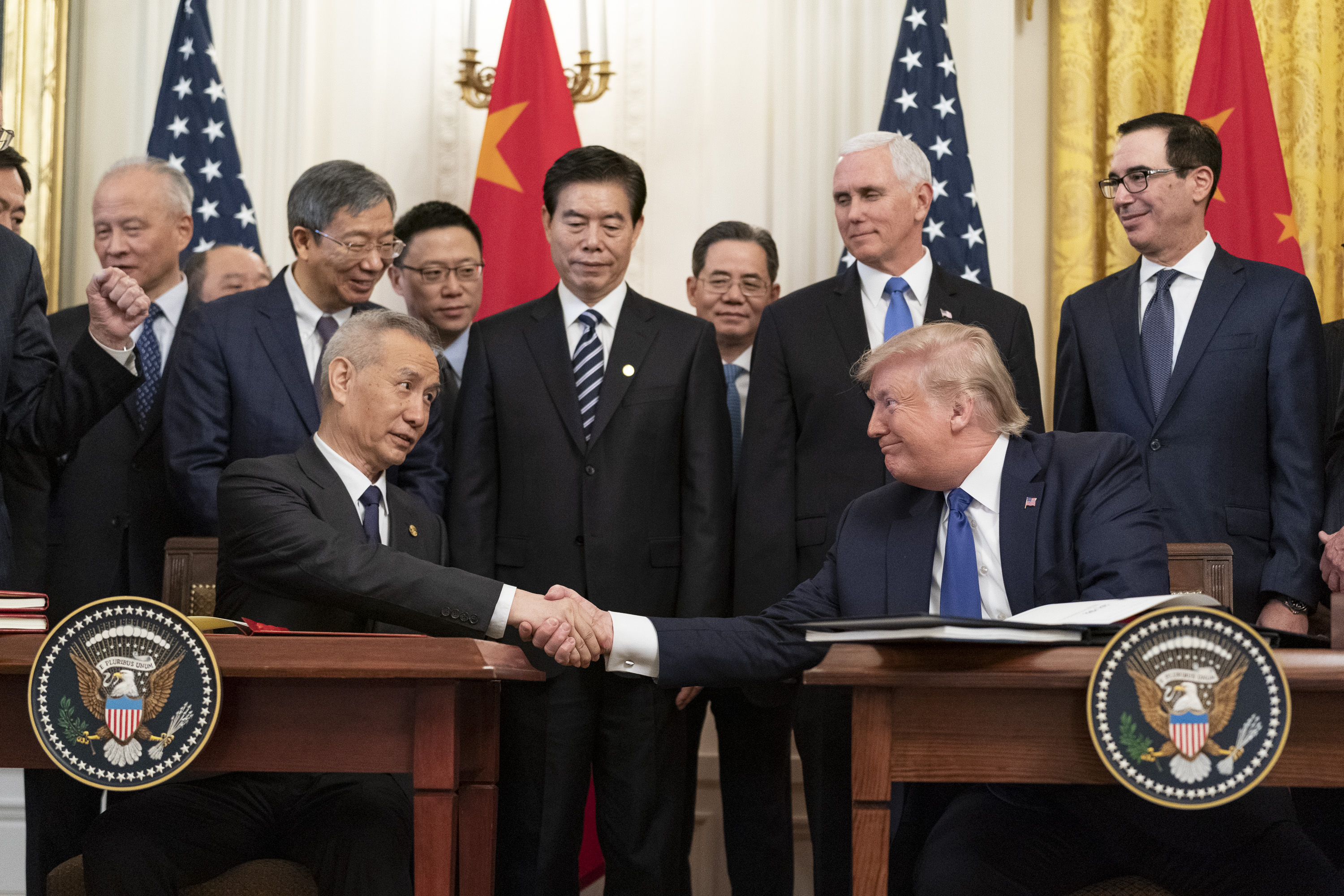
Trump and Chinese Vice Premier Liu He sign the Phase One Trade Deal, January 2020

On January 15, 2020 the U.S. and China entered into an agreement referred to as the "Phase One" trade deal. Reuters summarized the deal as follows:

- China will increase purchases of products & services by $200B over two years vs. 2017 levels of $130B in goods and $56 billion in services. This would approximately double U.S. exports to China.
- U.S. import tariffs would be cut from 15% to 7.5% on $120B of Chinese goods (the 9/1 tranche) effective 2/14. The 25% rate on $250 billion of Chinese goods would remain, so about $370B of Chinese imports would still have tariffs. The U.S. agreed to suspend an additional $160 billion in tariffs (12/15 tranche).
- China's planned retaliatory tariffs (12/15 tranche) were also suspended. China reduced tariffs on $75 billion worth of goods (9/1 tranche) on 2/5.
- China also pledged to strengthen intellectual property protection (patent/trademark/copyright); reduce pressure on foreign companies to transfer technology in exchange for market access; not competitively devalue its currency; and improve access to its financial market for U.S. financial institutions.

The deal was seen as a "cease-fire" in the trade war, although tariffs remained at elevated levels. The intent to enter into a "Phase Two" deal (scheduled to take place after the 2020 Presidential election) was also communicated. Critics questioned whether any of the terms were enforceable. U.S. allies expressed concerns that if China increases purchases from the U.S. by $200 billion, it will decrease purchases from them.

=== Economic impact of trade policies ===
In January 2020, the Congressional Budget Office (CBO) explained how tariffs reduce U.S. economic activity in three ways: 1) Consumer and capital goods become more expensive; 2) Business uncertainty increases, thereby reducing or slowing investment; and 3) Other countries impose retaliatory tariffs, making U.S. exports more expensive and thus reducing them. CBO summarized the economic impact of Trump's tariffs as follows:

- "In CBO's estimation, the trade barriers put in place by the United States and its trading partners between January 2018 and January 2020 would reduce real GDP over the projection period [2020–2030].
- The effects of those barriers on trade flows, prices, and output are projected to peak during the first half of 2020 and then begin to subside.
- Tariffs are expected to reduce the level of real GDP by roughly 0.5 percent and raise consumer prices by 0.5 percent in 2020.
- As a result, tariffs are also projected to reduce average real household income by $1,277 (in 2019 dollars) in 2020.
- CBO expects the effect of trade barriers on output and prices to diminish over time as businesses continue to adjust their supply chains in response to the changes in the international trading environment. By 2030, in CBO's projections, the tariffs lower the level of real GDP by 0.1 percent."

The New York Times reported in June 2019 that If Trump's tariffs are fully implemented as proposed, they would raise prices sufficiently to offset most or all of his tax cuts for lower- and middle-class households, potentially slowing the economy. Analysis by the Tax Foundation found that the benefits of the Trump tax cut would be completely eliminated for all taxpayers through the 90th percentile in earnings. Economists at the Federal Reserve Bank of NY estimated that tariffs implemented as of May 2019 cost the average family about $415 per year, while implementing the remaining threatened tariffs would bring the total to $830 per year. PBS reported on a Fed study indicating that steel and aluminum tariffs were associated with 0.6% fewer jobs in the U.S. manufacturing sector in mid-2019 relative to a scenario without the tariffs, roughly 75,000 jobs. This was because the cost of tariffs on steel and aluminum inputs makes the U.S. finished products more expensive, reducing the quantitity demanded domestically or exported.

The U.S. farm industry was adversely impacted by China canceling or delaying imports of soybeans and other products in retaliation for U.S. tariffs. In response, President Trump increased farm subsidies by an estimated $28 billion in a bailout attempt, over twice the $12 billion net cost of the 2009 automotive bailout. Much of these funds go to large corporations. Farmers are one of Trump's strongest constituencies, with 67% support.

Trump's repeated claims that tariffs would be paid by China were labeled "false" by fact-checkers. Approximately 40 economists surveyed by the University of Chicago either strongly agreed or agreed that U.S. households bear the cost of tariffs; none disagreed. Hundreds of companies have explained that the tariffs will make their costs rise, which will be passed to consumers.

President Trump increased tariffs significantly as part of his trade policies, which are effectively taxes paid by American import businesses, some of which are passed to American consumers in the form of higher prices. CBO reported that tariffs increased from $34.6 billion in 2017 (consistent with pre-trade war amounts from 2014 to 2016), to $41.3 billion in 2018 and $70.8 billion in 2019. Budget deficits would have been even higher in the absence of these tariff revenues.

=== Trade deficit ===
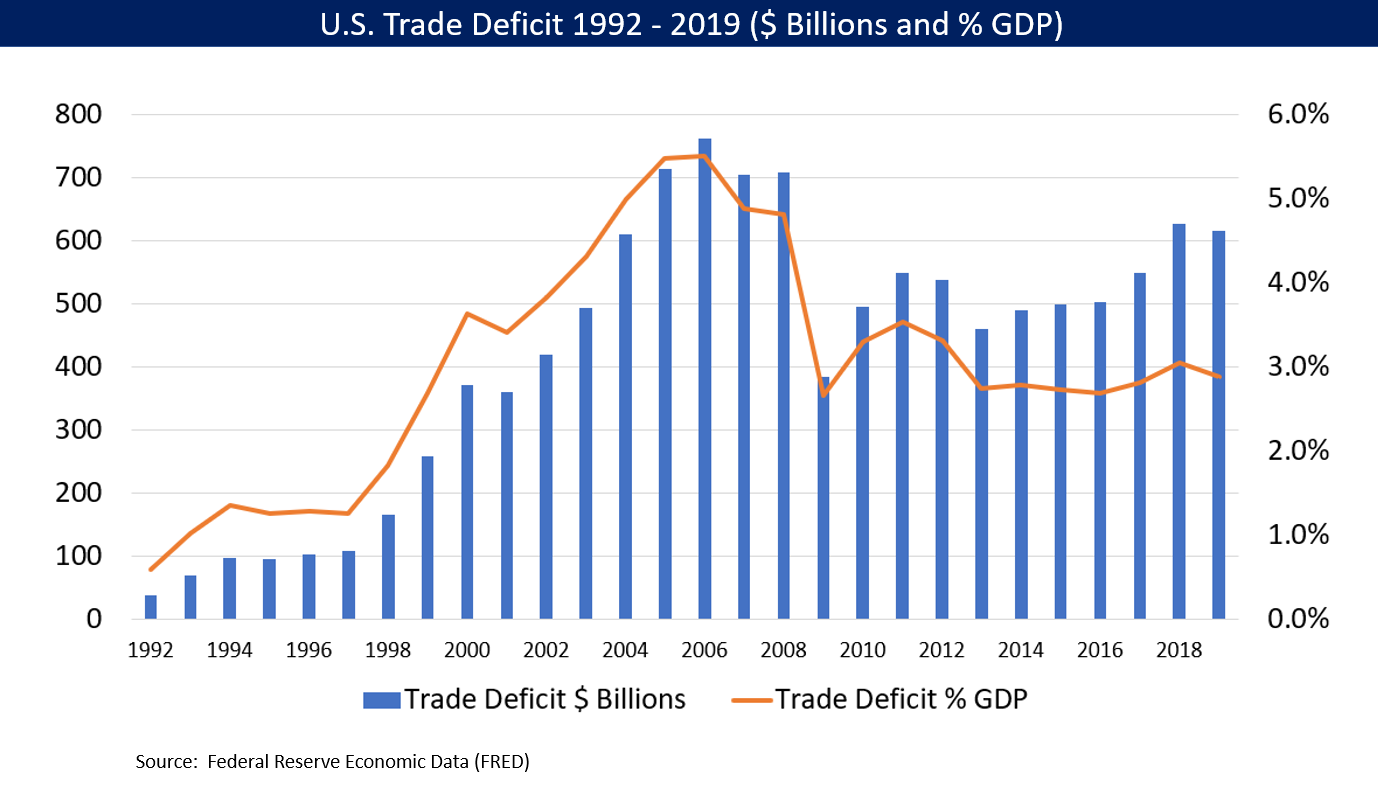
The U.S. Trade Deficit represents imports greater than exports; it was $628 billion (3.0% GDP) in 2018 and $617 billion (2.9% GDP) in 2019. The U.S. has a trade deficit in goods partially offset by a trade surplus in services. The goods-only trade deficit with China was $375 billion in 2017, $420 billion in 2018, and $346 billion in 2019.

Although Trump pledged to reduce the U.S. trade deficit, it increased over his term and hit a record high, exploding from $481 billion in 2016 to $679 billion in 2020. The trade deficit in goods alone hit a record high of $916 billion (a 21% increase from 2016). Trump's 2017 tax legislation exacerbated the increase in the trade deficit. The trade deficit increased in 2017 and 2018, slightly fell in 2019, then increased again in 2020.

== Manufacturing ==
Trump has emphasized increasing manufacturing jobs and the number of factories as key measures of success for his "America First" strategy. In his inaugural address, he referred to the long-term demise of manufacturing jobs as a contributor to "American carnage", with abandoned factories "scattered like tombstones" across the country. He has attempted to protect American manufacturing by the imposition of tariffs, primarily on China. However, economists debate the extent to which trade policy and China are primary causes of the decline in manufacturing employment, as automation has played a significant role as well. Further, the strategy of protectionism (i.e., to impose trade barriers such as tariffs, to retain or bring jobs back that were off-shored) as opposed to retraining and relocating workers adversely impacted by globalization, is debatable.

Manufacturing employment peaked in June 1979 at 19.6 million and remained in a range of about 16–18 million until early 2001, when it began a steep decline that roughly coincided with China's entry into the World Trade Organization in December 2001. This downward trend hit bottom in March 2010 at 11.5 million following the Great Recession. An estimated 1–2 million of the job losses in manufacturing 1999–2011 were due to competition with China (the China shock). The Economic Policy Institute estimated that the trade deficit with China cost about 2.7 million jobs between 2001 and 2011, including manufacturing and other industries. Economist Paul Krugman argued in December 2016 that "America's shift away from manufacturing doesn't have much to do with trade, and even less to do with trade policy," meaning a shift towards service employment and automation. He also cited the work of other economists indicating that the declines in manufacturing employment from 1999 to 2011 due to trade policy generally and trade with China specifically were "less than a fifth of the absolute loss of manufacturing jobs over the period" but that the effects were significant for regions directly impacted by those losses. In contrast to the China situation, manufacturing employment increased for several years following the adoption of NAFTA in early 1994, indicating it had little or no manufacturing jobs impact in total.

Manufacturing employment has steadily recovered since 2010, reaching 12.4 million by December 2016 at the end of the Obama Administration (+900,000 from bottom) and reaching 12.9 million in January 2020 (+500,000 from start of Trump Administration). Manufacturing job creation was robust in 2017 and 2018, but slowed significantly in 2019. The uncertainty for businesses created by the trade war with China following the imposition of tariffs in 2018 likely contributed to a significant decline in manufacturing activity and job creation in 2019, the opposite effect Trump intended. Fed minutes from the December 2019 meeting indicated "Manufacturing production appeared likely to remain soft in coming months, reflecting generally weak readings on new orders from national and regional manufacturing surveys, declining domestic business investment, slow economic growth abroad and a persistent drag from trade developments."

Economist Paul Krugman argued in October 2019 that manufacturing had entered a "mini-recession", with production down and employment in Wisconsin, Michigan and Pennsylvania falling significantly from summer 2018 to December 2019, due in part to Trump's trade policies and other behavior that adversely impacted business investment. The U.S. had experienced another mini-recession in manufacturing in 2015–2016, as oil prices tumbled causing business investment to fall along with manufacturing employment.

Analysis published by The Wall Street Journal in October 2020 found the trade war Trump initiated in early 2018 did not achieve the primary objective of reviving American manufacturing, nor did it result in the reshoring of factory production.

== Immigration ==
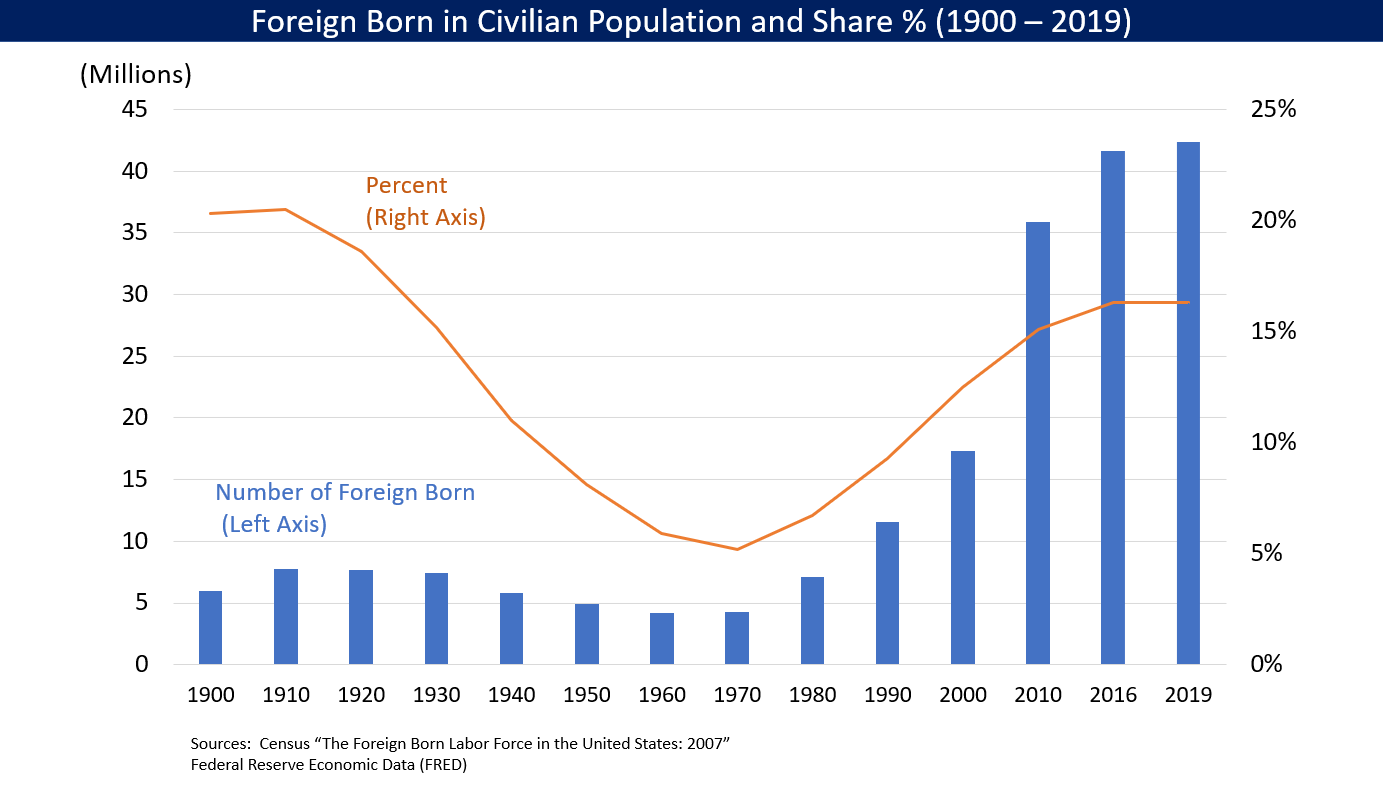
Number and share of foreign born residents in the U.S. from 1900 to 2019. In 2019, there were 42.4 million foreign-born U.S. residents, or 16.3% of the civilian noninstitutional population of 259.5 million.

A key element of Trump's "America First" strategy involves reducing the number of both legal and undocumented immigrants. An important symbol of his policy is the building of a wall at the border with Mexico. Trump's legal immigration reduction policies include: travel bans for 13 countries; visa restrictions (e.g., additional vetting and interviews for travelers); refugee caps; asylum policy changes; higher citizenship application fees; and wealth tests for green card applicants (e.g., a "public charge" rule, which would have blocked up to two-thirds of applicants admitted from 2012 to 2016), among other approaches.

Speaking at a private gathering in February 2020, acting White House chief of staff Mick Mulvaney stated, "We are desperate – desperate – for more people. We are running out of people to fuel the economic growth that we've had in our nation over the last four years. We need more immigrants," noting he was referring to legal immigration. During 2018 and 2019, the number of open jobs (total non-farm) averaged 7.2 million.

Economist Austan Goolsbee explained in October 2019 that GDP growth is a function of the number of people and income per person (productivity), and restricting immigration hurts both measures. Immigrants start companies at twice the rate of Native Americans, and half the companies in the Fortune 500 were started by immigrants or their children; such innovation helps drive productivity. He opined: "The long-run health of the U.S. economy is in serious danger from a self-inflicted wound: The Trump Administration's big cuts in immigration." He cited statistics indicating immigration to the U.S. fell 70% in 2018 to only 200,000 people, the lowest level in more than a decade. If immigration stayed at that level rather than the typical 1 million per year, research from Moody's Analytics indicates GDP would be $1 trillion lower than it would otherwise be in a decade. Further, retirement programs such as Social Security and Medicare are funded by payroll taxes paid by workers; fewer workers means significant funding shortfalls for these programs.

The Economist reported in February 2020 that strong nominal wage gains experienced by lower-paid workers in 2019 may be due in part to restrictions on immigration, along with the low unemployment rate giving workers more bargaining power, and significant increases in state-level minimum wages over several years. However, nominal wages are increasing in many rich countries, even those with growing foreign-born populations. Further, the article cautioned: "As America ages, it will need a lot more people willing to work in health care. Study after study finds a positive association between immigration and long-run economic growth – and therefore, ultimately, the living standards of all Americans. The Trump Administration's immigration [restrictions] may achieve a temporary boost in wages of the low-paid now, but at a cost to the country's future prosperity."

Among the employed, the share of foreign-born workers increased from 17.0% in December 2016 to a peak of 17.8% in February 2019, before falling to 17.2% in January 2020. Among the civilian noninstitutional population the share of foreign-born persons rose from 16.3% in December 2016 to peaks of 16.9% in March 2018 and 2019, before falling to 16.3% in January 2020. The Economist also reported that: "For the first time in half a century America's immigrant population appears to be in sustained decline, both in absolute terms and as a share of the total."

== Deregulation ==
Deregulation refers to either removing or limiting government regulations of a market. President Trump and other Republicans believe that some U.S. markets are over-regulated. However, the U.S. ranks high on the world scale of regulatory freedom, ranking 17th (mostly free) out of 169 countries on The Heritage Foundation's 2017 edition of the Index of Economic Freedom and sixth out of 143 countries on the 2016 Cato Institute freedom index, meaning the U.S. markets are relatively unregulated compared to other countries. It is arguable whether additional deregulation would be beneficial. For example, regulations or anti-trust action that address monopoly or oligopoly conditions can improve competition in a market, lowering prices and expanding output and employment.

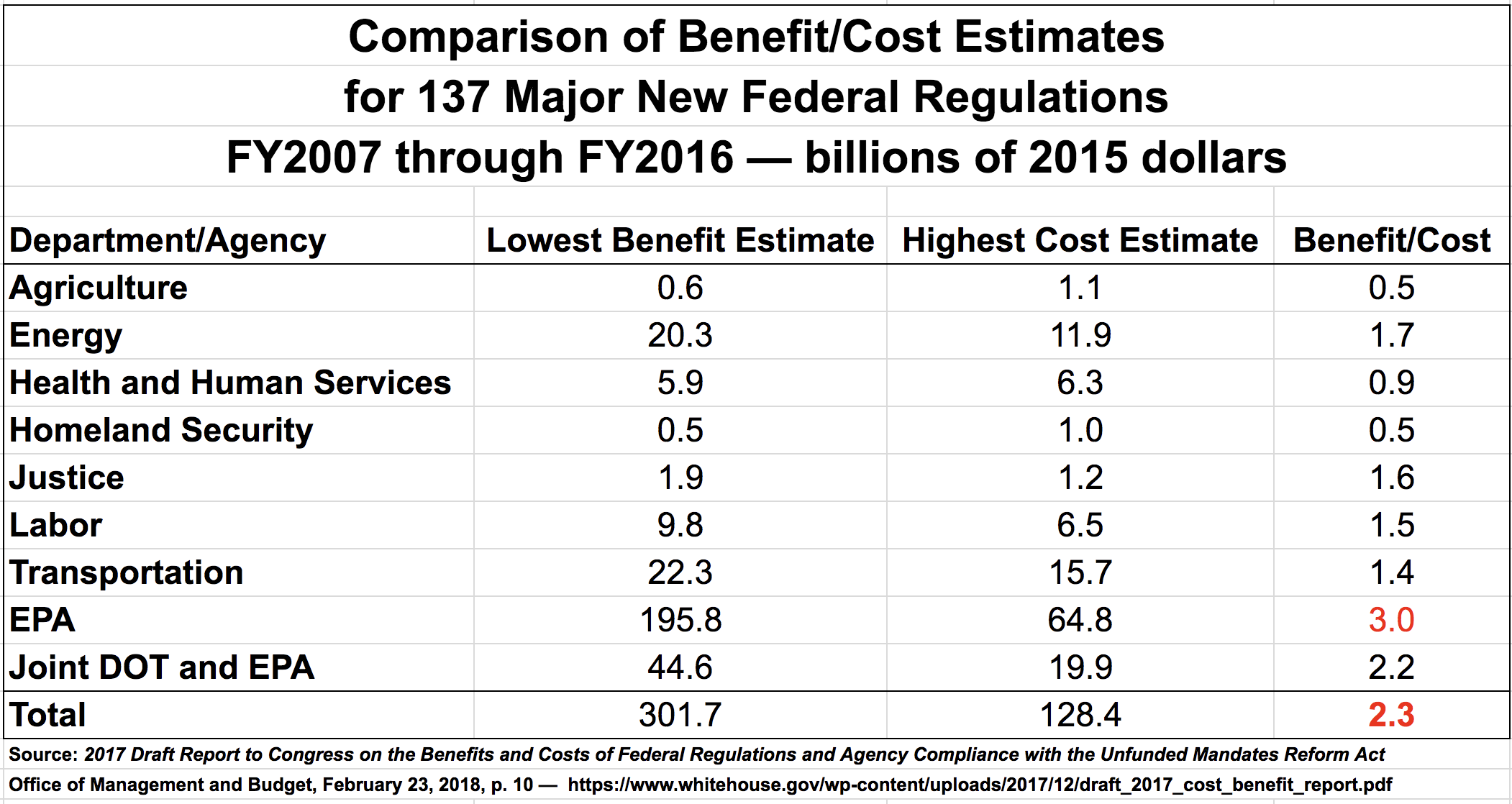

A report released in February 2018 by the Trump administration Office of Management and Budget (OMB) analyzed 137 "major" federal regulations (those with $100 million or more in economic impact) from FY2007 through FY2016, a period that encompasses all but the last four months of the Obama administration. According to OMB calculations, in constant 2015 dollars the overall economic benefits far outweighed the economic costs, with aggregate benefits ranging from $302 to $930 billion, while aggregate costs ranged from $88 to $128 billion. Overall, the lowest estimate of regulatory benefits exceeded the highest estimate of regulatory costs by a ratio of 2.3X. Among the department/agency regulations that were evaluated, the largest ratio of lowest estimated benefits to highest estimated costs was 3.0X for the EPA, which the Trump administration has targeted for particularly aggressive regulatory rollback under administrator Scott Pruitt. Journalist David Roberts wrote in Vox in March 2018 that: "According to OMB – and to the federal agencies upon whose data OMB mostly relied – the core of the Trumpian case against Obama regulations, arguably the organizing principle of Trump's administration, is false." Rolling back Obama-era regulations can cost money, rather than save it, and there was no discernible job impact.

The QuantGov project at the Mercatus Center tracks the count of federal regulations containing restrictive terms such as "shall," "prohibited" or "may not." Their data indicate that such regulations increased 0.7% in calendar 2017, compared to 1.1% in 2016 and 0.1% in 2015, and compared to an average of 1.4% over the preceding 20 years.

Through September 2018, the Trump administration published 69 new "major" regulatory rules in the Federal Register.

According to the nonpartisan Institute for Policy Integrity, through the middle of the Trump administration's fourth year about 10% of its deregulatory efforts had been upheld by courts, compared to an average of 70% during previous Republican and Democratic administrations.

=== Environmental ===
President Trump began a "high-profile" regulatory roll-back during 2017. The Administration adopted a more lenient approach to pollution relative to both the Bush and Obama Administrations, with less stringent enforcement by the Environmental Protection Agency.

=== Climate change ===
Trump announced the U.S. would leave the Paris Agreement on June 1, 2017. Under the Agreement, each country determines, plans and regularly reports its own contribution and targets for mitigating global warming. There is no mechanism to force a country to set a specific target by a specific date, but each target should go beyond previously set targets. As of November 2017, 195 UNFCCC members have signed the agreement, and 170 have become party to it.

The New York Times Editorial Board wrote on June 1, 2017: "Mr. Trump's policies – the latest of which was his decision to withdraw from the 2015 Paris agreement on climate change – have dismayed America's allies, defied the wishes of much of the American business community he pretends to help, threatened America's competitiveness as well as job growth in crucial industries and squandered what was left of America's claim to leadership on an issue of global importance." The Editorial Board referred to Trump's argument that an agreement to fight climate change would hurt the U.S. economy as "bogus."

=== Banking and consumer protection ===
President Trump began efforts to loosen regulations imposed on financial institutions under the Dodd–Frank Act, which was implemented following the 2007–2008 subprime mortgage crisis. The president also installed budget director Mick Mulvaney to lead the Consumer Financial Protection Bureau established by Dodd–Frank. Mr. Mulvaney had been a "staunch opponent" of the Agency's past history of broad regulations. President Trump tweeted on November 25, 2017, that "Financial institutions have been devastated and unable to properly serve the public" even though commercial banks generated a record level of profit of $157 billion in 2016, lending activity was robust, and bank stocks were in record territory. The Trump administration and others have asserted that excessive financial regulation since 2008 has caused banks, particularly smaller banks, to decline in numbers. However, the FDIC has noted that "Consolidation in the U.S. banking industry is a multidecade trend that reduced the number of federally insured banks from 17,901 in 1984 to 7,357 in 2011" and this trend has continued through 2017.

The Republican-controlled House passed the Financial CHOICE Act, an expansive rollback of the Dodd–Frank Act, on June 8, 2017. A less aggressive bill was approved by the Republican-controlled Senate on March 14, 2018. The House approved the Senate measure on May 22, 2018. The previous day, Trump signed a bill that repealed the enforcement of automobile lending rules.

=== Net neutrality ===
The Federal Communications Commission (FCC) voted to repeal net neutrality regulations (the Open Internet Order) on December 14, 2017. This is expected to reduce the regulation of broadband (telecom) companies (such as AT&T and Comcast) that connect consumers' homes to the internet, essentially no longer regulating them as utilities. These providers tend to have little competition in a geographic area. Advocates and critics argued whether the move would help or hurt consumers and how it would shift market power between broadband providers and content providers (e.g., Netflix). This reversed a 2015 decision by the FCC.

== Household financial position ==
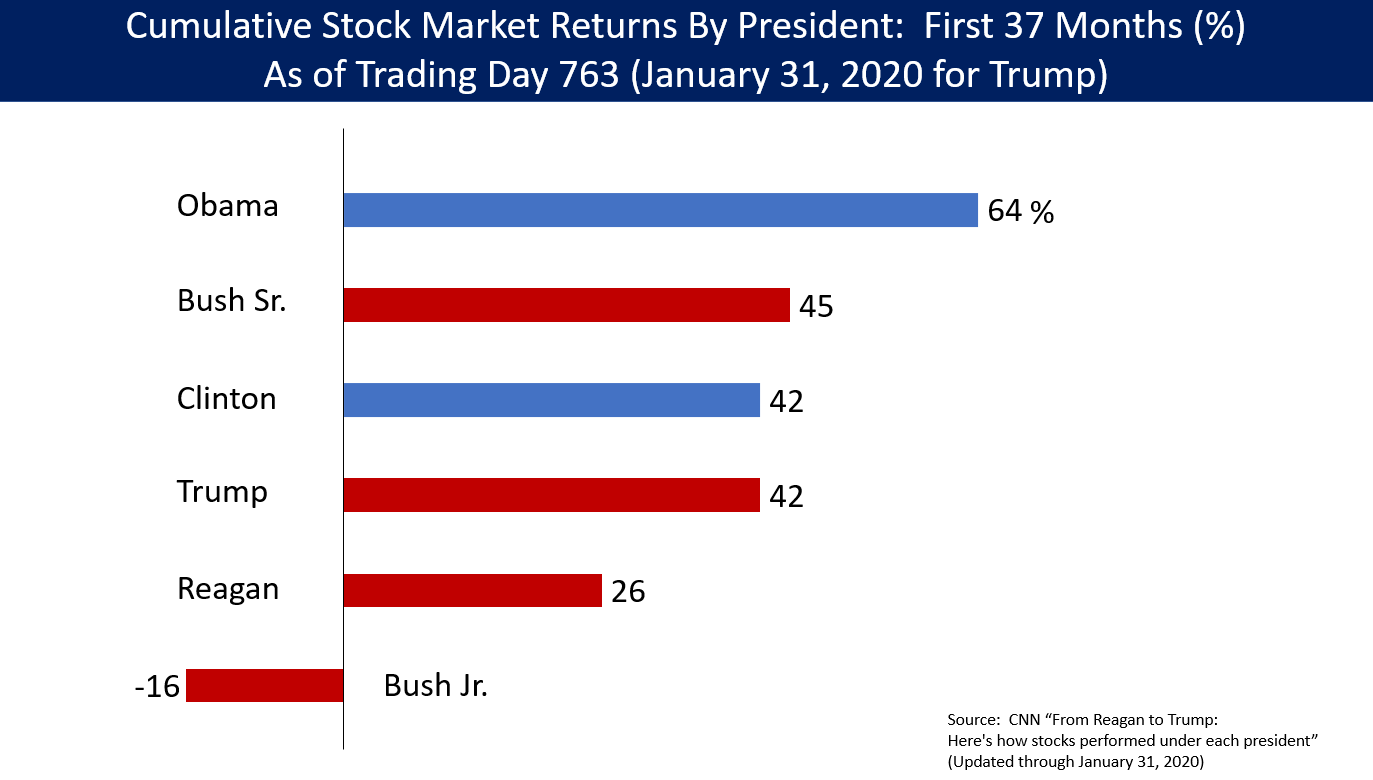
Cumulative stock market returns (S&P 500) by President as of trading day 763 of their presidency. Trump was tied for 3rd of the past six Presidents.

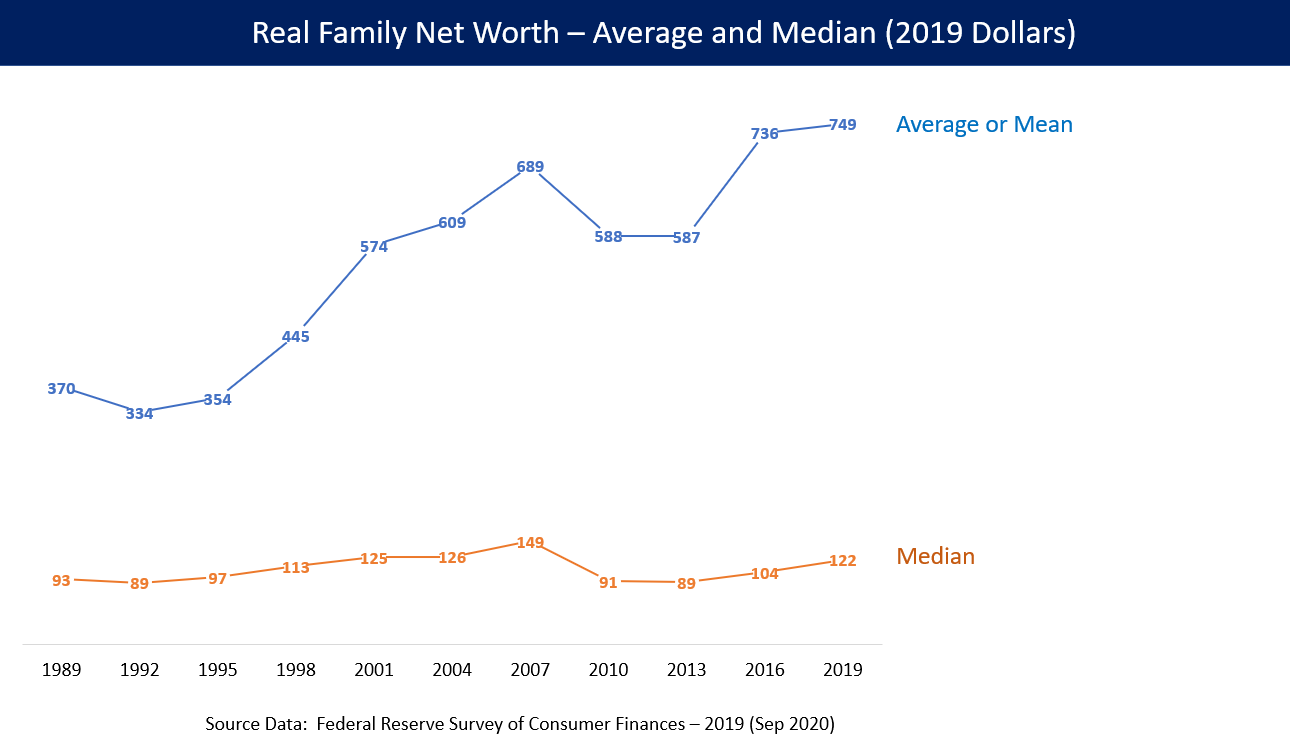
U.S. median family net worth peaked in 2007, declined due to the Great Recession until 2013, and only partially recovered by 2019. The much larger average shows wealth inequality. Discontent with this result may have been a contributing factor to President Trump's 2016 election.

=== Stock market ===
Trump frequently used the stock market as a measure of success. The Dow Jones would increase to nearly 31,000 by the end of Trump's term compared to the 20,000 it was when Trump took office. Average annual return for the S&P 500 was 13.73% under Trump, third behind Clinton (15.18%) and Obama (13.84%) among presidents dating back to the late 1800s. Trump cut statutory corporate tax rates from 35% to 21% effective January 1, 2018 as part of the Tax Cuts and Jobs Act. Anticipation of these cuts and a deregulatory regime significantly boosted the stock market in 2017. Federal corporate income tax revenues fell from $300 billion in fiscal year 2017 to $200 billion in fiscal year 2018, a roughly 30% decline, with significant increases in after-tax corporate profits and stock buybacks. However, 2018 stock market performance was adversely impacted by several increases in interest rates by the Federal Reserve, which did so to limit or avoid inflation caused by the stimulus effects of the Trump tax cuts, with the stock market falling nearly 20% from its peak in December 2018. The U.S. Federal Reserve then reversed course in 2019 and both cut rates and resumed expanding its balance sheet, boosting the stock market despite uncertainty created by Trump's trade policies.

During March 2020, the Dow Jones Industrial Average entered a bear market, closing down over 20% from its most recent peak on February 12, 2020. Analysts primarily blamed the COVID-19 pandemic. The U.S. stock market had grown consistently since its low point in March 2009, arguably the longest "bull market" in U.S. history.

However, about half of Americans did not participate in this 2009–2020 bull market. In March 2017, NPR summarized the distribution of U.S. stock market ownership (direct and indirect through mutual funds) in the U.S., which is highly concentrated among the wealthiest families, with the bottom 80% owning only 8% of stocks. Further, more than one-third of Americans who work full-time have no access to pensions or retirement accounts such as 401(k)s that derive their value from financial assets like stocks and bonds. The NYT reported that the percentage of workers covered by generous defined-benefit pension plans has declined from 62% in 1983 to 17% by 2016. While some economists consider an increase in the stock market to have a "wealth effect" that increases economic growth, economists like Former Dallas Federal Reserve Bank President Richard Fisher believe those effects are limited.

=== Household net worth ===
Household net worth is the sum of financial, real estate, and business assets (non-corporate), less liabilities. In nominal terms (not adjusted for inflation) it declined in 2008 due to the Great Recession but resumed steadily rising in 2009 and reached its sixth consecutive annual record high in 2017. This was primarily driven by stock market increases, although housing price increases also contributed. The $100 trillion level was reached in Q1 2018, which is approximately $800,000 per household on average. However, the median (50th percentile) family had $100,000 net worth in 2016, an indicator of the dramatic wealth inequality in the U.S.

The Federal Reserve publishes information on the distribution of household wealth by quarter going back to 1989. From Q4 2016 (the end of the Obama Administration) to Q2 2020, real household net worth in total increased by $16.28 trillion or about 17%, driven primarily by stock market gains. Since the bottom 50% of U.S. households measured by net worth have little if any stock market exposure (neither directly nor indirectly through 401k plans), that group received $0.88 trillion of that gain, about 5% (i.e., 0.88/16.28). The 90–99th percentile received 40% of the gain, the top 1% received 27% and the 50th–90th percentile received 27%. The following table summarizes the Fed data:

The table below shows changes from Q4 2016 (the end of the Obama Administration) to Q2 2020.

Household Net Worth	Top 1%	90th to 99th	50th to 90th	Bottom 50%	Total
Q4 2016 ($ trillions)	30.26	37.10	28.67	1.23	97.26
Q2 2020 ($ trillions)	34.68	43.67	33.08	2.11	113.54
Increase ($ trillions)	4.42	6.57	4.41	0.88	16.28
% Increase	14.6%	17.7%	15.4%	71.5%	16.7%
Share of Increase (Increase/Total Increase)	27.1%	40.4%	27.1%	5.4%	100%
(Intentionally left blank)
Share of Net Worth Q4 2016	31.1%	38.1%	29.5%	1.3%	100%
Share of Net Worth Q2 2020	30.5%	38.5%	29.1%	1.9%	100%
Change in Share	−0.6%	+0.3%	−0.3%	+0.6%	0.0%

=== Household income ===
Real median household income continued in record territory under President Trump, as indicated in the table below. The White House Council of Economic Advisers estimated in October 2017 that the corporate tax cut of the TCJA would increase real median household income by $3,000 to $7,000 annually. This did not occur in 2018, with the Census Bureau characterizing the increase as statistically insignificant. Critics explained that much of the corporate tax cuts went to stock buybacks and other corporate purposes, not wages. The 2019 increase of $4,379 or 6.8% was the largest in records going back to 1985, although the Census Bureau did not attribute a cause.

Variable	2015	2016 Previous Record	2017 Previous Record	2018 Previous Record	2019 Record
Real median household income	$60,987	$62,898	$63,761	$64,324	$68,703
Change vs. Prior Year	$2,986	$1,911	$863	$563	$4,379
% Change vs. Prior Year	5.1%	3.1%	1.4%	0.9%	6.8%

The U.S. poverty rate has fallen each year since the 2014 level of 14.8%. It fell from 12.7% in 2016, to 12.3% in 2017, 11.8% in 2018, and 10.5% in 2019, with an estimated 34 million people in poverty.

=== Household Economic Well-Being ===
In its annual Report on the Economic Well-Being of U.S. Households released on May 22, 2018, the Federal Reserve found that 74% of surveyed adults were either "doing okay" or "living comfortably" in 2017, up from 70% in 2016, the fourth consecutive increase since the Fed first asked that survey question in 2013.

=== Effect of gas prices ===
The average U.S. gasoline price during Trump's term through October 2020 was $2.49; the economic slowdown caused by the COVID-19 pandemic led to a global decline in demand for oil, which kept prices low. During Trump's term, the highest average U.S. gasoline price was $2.90 (in May 2019) and the lowest average price was $1.88 (in May 2020). Trump's withdrawal from the Iran nuclear deal in 2018, as well as OPEC quotas established while the global economy was growing (pre-recession), put upward pressure on gasoline prices.

=== SNAP participation ===
On July 27, 2018 remarks about the economy, Trump stated, "More than 10 million additional Americans had been added to food stamps, past years. But we've turned it all around." SNAP participation had been steadily declining since December 2012.

=== Homelessness ===
HUD reported in December 2017 that homelessness increased 0.7% in 2017, the first annual increase since 2010.

== Corporate profits ==
Nominal corporate profits after tax declined from $1,787 billion in 2016 to $1,680 billion in 2017, a decrease of 6.0%. However, the Tax Cuts and Jobs Act is expected to increase corporate after-tax profits significantly beginning in 2018, when the corporate tax rate falls from 35% to 21%. For example, corporate profits after tax (annualized) rose from $1,845 billion for Q2 2017 to $1,969 billion in Q2 2018, up $124 billion or 6.7%, an all-time dollar record. At 9.64% GDP, they were below the Q1 2010 to Q4 2016 average of 10.22% GDP.

Bank profits reached a record high of $56 billion in the first quarter following enactment of the Tax Cuts and Jobs Act, although the figure would have been a record high $49.4 billion without the tax cut.

== Income and wealth inequality ==
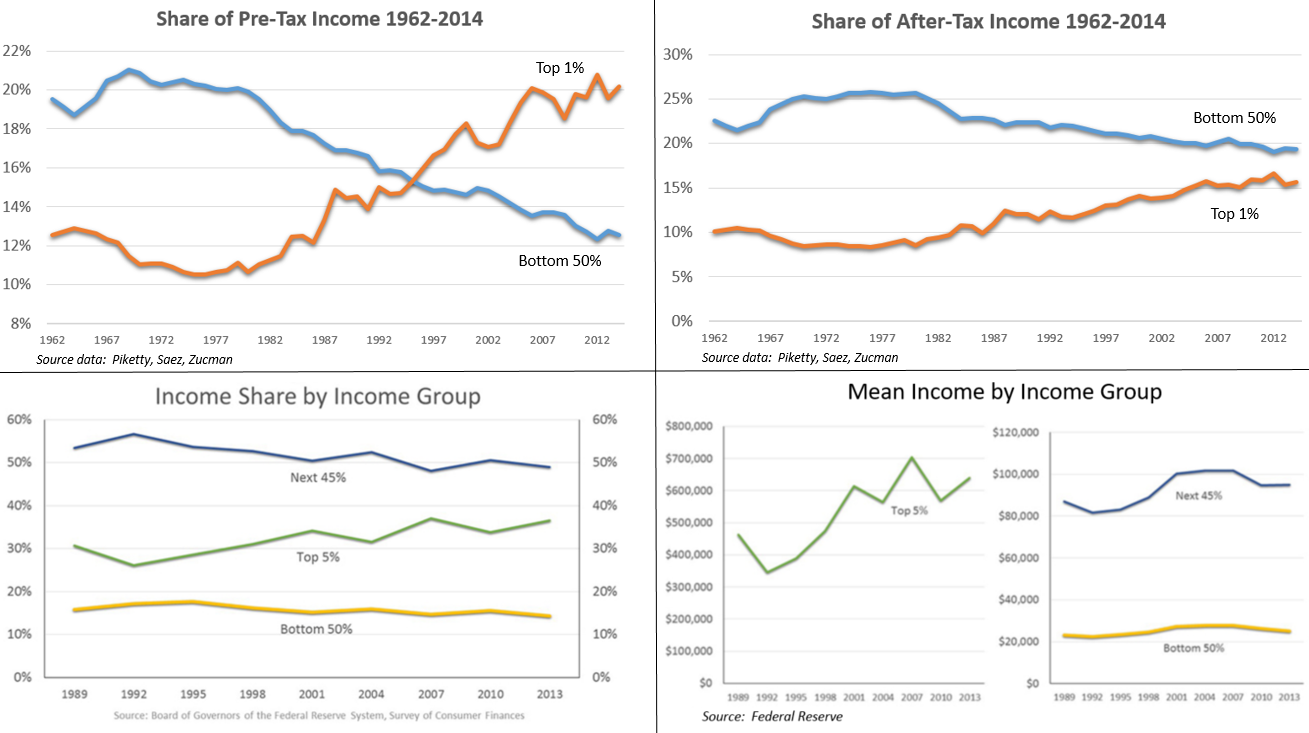
Four charts that describe trends in income inequality in the United States.

The New York Times editorial board characterized the tax bill as both a consequence and a cause of income and wealth inequality: "Most Americans know that the Republican tax bill will widen economic inequality by lavishing breaks on corporations and the wealthy while taking benefits away from the poor and the middle class. What many may not realize is that growing inequality helped create the bill in the first place. As a smaller and smaller group of people cornered an ever-larger share of the nation's wealth, so too did they gain an ever-larger share of political power. They became, in effect, kingmakers; the tax bill is a natural consequence of their long effort to bend American politics to serve their interests." The corporate tax rate was 48% in the 1970s and is 21% under the Act. The top individual rate was 70% in the 1970s and is 37% under the Act. Despite these large cuts, incomes for the working class have stagnated and workers now pay a larger share of the pre-tax income in payroll taxes.

The share of income going to the top 1% has doubled, from 10% to 20%, since the pre-1980 period, while the share of wealth owned by the top 1% has risen from around 25% to 42%. Despite President Trump promising to address those left behind, the Tax Cuts and Jobs Act would make inequality far worse:

- The Tax Policy Center estimated that the bottom 80% of taxpayers (income under $149,400) would receive 35% of the benefit in 2018, 34% in 2025 and none of the benefit in 2027, with some groups incurring costs.
- Sizable corporate tax cuts would flow mostly to wealthy executives and shareholders;
- In 2019, a person in the bottom 10% would average a $50 tax cut, while a person in the top 1% gets a $34,000 tax cut;
- Up to 13 million persons losing health insurance or subsidies are overwhelmingly in the bottom 30% of the income distribution;
- The top 1% receives approximately 70% of the pass-through income, which will be subject to much lower taxes;
- Rolling back the estate tax, which only impacted the top 0.2% of estates in 2016, is a $150 billion benefit [Note: The final version of the tax law reduced this to $83 billion] to the ultra-rich over 10 years.
- The top 1% of households own 40% of stocks; the bottom 80% just 7%, even when including indirect ownership through mutual funds.

In 2027, if the tax cuts are matched by spending cuts borne evenly by all families, after-tax income would be 3.0% higher for the top 0.1%, 1.5% higher for the top 10%, −0.6% for the middle 40% (30th to 70th percentile) and −2.0% for the bottom 50%.

The NYT reported in July 2018 that: "The top-earning 1 percent of households—those earning more than $607,000 a year—will pay a combined $111 billion less this year in federal taxes than they would have if the laws had remained unchanged since 2000. That's an enormous windfall. It's more, in total dollars, than the tax cut received over the same period by the entire bottom 60 percent of earners." This represents the tax cuts for the top 1% from the Bush tax cuts and Trump tax cuts, partially offset by the tax increases on the top 1% by Obama.

In December 2019, CBO forecast that inequality would worsen between 2016 and 2021, due in part to the Trump tax cuts and policies regarding means-tested transfers. Their report had several conclusions:

- After taxes and transfers, the income of the top 1% would grow more than other income groups, continuing previous trends.
- Income of households in the bottom 99% percent would be higher than at any time in the past, adjusted for inflation, also continuing previous trends.
- For the top 1%, average federal tax rates would fall from 33% in 2016 to 30% (3 percentage points) in 2021. For the 81st to 99th percentiles, the rate would fall from 24% to 22%, and for the middle three quintiles, the rate would fall from 15% to 14%. These trends indicate worsening inequality, with larger tax reductions for higher incomes.
- The gini index would rise, indicating increasing inequality, reversing a trend from the latter part of the Obama administration.
- Means-tested transfer programs would contribute less to reducing inequality in 2021 than they did in 2016.

== See also ==
- 2010s in United States political history
- 2019 in politics and government
