= Holbrookia subcaudalis =

Scientific classification
- Domain: Eukaryota
- Kingdom: Animalia
- Phylum: Chordata
- Class: Reptilia
- Order: Squamata
- Suborder: Iguania
- Family: Phrynosomatidae
- Genus: Holbrookia
- Species: H. subcaudalis

Binomial name
- Holbrookia subcaudalis Axtell, 1956

Synonyms
- Holbrookia subcaudalis — Ernest A. Liner, 1994

Species of lizard

Holbrookia subcaudalis, commonly known as the southern spot-tailed earless lizard, is a species of lizard in the genus Holbrookia. It was previously considered a subspecies of Holbrookia lacerata.

== Geographic range ==
It is found in northern Mexico and the United States in southern Texas.

== Description ==
The southern spot-tailed earless lizard is overall light grayish tan in color, with two paravertebral rows of transverse light-edged dark blotches, one row down either side of the back and a second lateral row of dark, pale-edged blotches that are usually not connected to the paravertebral blotches. Adults are 11.5–15.4 cm (4.5–6.1 in) in total length. They have round, dark spots on the ventral surface of the tail, a characteristic which gives them both their common and scientific names. As with all species and subspecies of earless lizard, they have no external ear openings. When gravid, females will often turn greenish yellow on neck and trunk.

== Behavior ==
As with all earless lizards, the southern spot-tailed earless lizard is diurnal and insectivorous.

== Habitat ==
Their preferred habitat is subhumid agricultural and nonagricultural flatlands and very low rolling hills with sparse vegetation such as small patches of grass on dark clay loam soils, with a few mesquite trees mesquite, but not prickly pear cactus.

== Reproduction ==
They are oviparous.
