= Holbrookia maculata perspicua =

Scientific classification
- Kingdom: Animalia
- Phylum: Chordata
- Class: Reptilia
- Order: Squamata
- Suborder: Iguania
- Family: Phrynosomatidae
- Genus: Holbrookia
- Species: H. maculata
- Subspecies: H. m. perspicua

Trinomial name
- Holbrookia maculata perspicua Axtell, 1956

Subspecies of lizard

Holbrookia maculata perspicua, commonly known as the eastern earless lizard and the prairie earless lizard, is a subspecies of lizard in the family Phrynosomatidae. H. m. perspicua is a subspecies of the lesser earless lizard (Holbrookia maculata). The subspecies is native to the prairies of the central United States.

== Geographic range ==
H. m. perspicua is found in Oklahoma, and northern Texas.

== Description ==
The prairie earless lizard is an overall gray-brown in color, a row of dark blotches on either side of the back, and a light-colored stripe down the middle of the back. The male has black and white diagonal markings just before its hind legs. Typically, females lack these markings. H. m. perspicua may grow to a total length (including tail) of 4.5 to 6 in (11 to 15 cm), and like all earless lizards, it has no external ear openings. As its geographic range overlaps with other subspecies of H. maculata, distinguishing it can be difficult.

== Behavior ==
Like all earless lizards, the prairie earless lizard is diurnal and insectivorous. It often seen basking on rocks, but will flee quickly if approached.

== Reproduction ==
H. m. perspicua is oviparous.
