= Parks of Corpus Christi, Texas =

The following is the list of parks of Corpus Christi, Texas.

Name	Location	Established	Size
Heritage Park	1581 N Chaparral St		
Mustang Island State Park	State Highway 361	1979	
Cole Park	2600 Ocean Dr		
Corpus Christi Skate Park	1526 Ocean Drive		
West Guth Park	9725 Up River Rd		
South Guth Park	956 Nile Dr		
Oso Creek Park	6805 Safety Steel Dr		
Bill Witt Park & Ball Park	Yorktown Blvd		
Garden Park & Senior Center	5325 Greely		
North Beach Eco Park		2019	
