= John Edwards Holbrook =

American zoologist

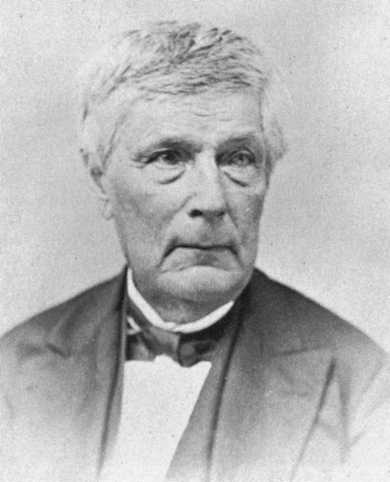
- Holbrook in 1865
- Born: December 31, 1796; Beaufort, South Carolina, US
- Died: September 8, 1871 (aged 74)
- Education: Brown University (A.B.); University of Pennsylvania (M.D.)
- Spouse: Harriott Pinckney Rutledge
- Scientific career
- Fields: Zoology
- Author abbrev. (zoology): Holbrook

John Edwards Holbrook (December 31, 1796 – September 8, 1871) was an American zoologist, herpetologist, medical doctor, and naturalist, born in Beaufort, South Carolina, the son of Silas Holbrook, a teacher, and Mary Edwards. Although Holbrook's memoir, written by his medical partner, and his tombstone both give the date 1794 for his birth, this is incorrect. Holbrook received his A.B. degree from Brown University in 1815, and his M.D. from the University of Pennsylvania in 1818. In 1827, he married Harriott Pinckney Rutledge, granddaughter of John Rutledge and a member of the Middleton-Rutledge-Pinckney family.

He provided the first comprehensive illustrated account of North American amphibians and reptiles in the two editions of his North American Herpetology; or, A Description of the Reptiles Inhabiting the United States. The first edition in four volumes (1836–1840) is very rare because Holbrook attempted to destroy all copies in a bonfire in his backyard over unfavorable criticism of the colored plates. Because of its rarity, the first edition has been digitized and made freely available by the Biodiversity Heritage Library. The second edition in five volumes (1842) was better received and is still an important benchmark reference work. Among the new species which he described in these works are the brown water snake (Nerodia taxispilota), the brown snake (Storeria dekayi) and the ornate chorus frog (Pseudacris ornata).

The eastern spadefoot toad (Scaphiopus holbrookii), the earless lizard genus Holbrookia, the speckled kingsnake (Lampropeltis getula holbrooki) and the spottail pinfish (Diplodus holbrookii) are named in his honor.

"Also in the 1840s, in Charleston, South Carolina, a physician, John Edwards Holbrook, who had nearly completed his magnum opus, North American Herpetology, continued an interest in fishes which finally led to production of a beautifully illustrated Fishes of South Carolina."

Holbrook was elected an Associate Fellow of the American Academy of Arts and Sciences in 1845. In 1855, he commenced the publication of the '"Ichthyology of South Carolina" in parts, and ten of these were issued when the further publication was interrupted by a fire which destroyed the "Artists' Buildings" in Philadelphia, where the pictorial portion of the work was being prosecuted. The original drawings, as well as plates and stones, were all destroyed. Holbrook took advantage of this loss to better his work in various ways. He explained the circumstances which led to the new edition in his "preface," here reproduced in part: "The great delay in the publication of the Ichthyology of South Carolina has been caused by the destruction of all the plates, stones, and original drawings in the burning of the 'Artists' Buildings,' in Philadelphia, several years since.' This made it necessary to have new drawings made of all the different fishes, which has been done at great expense, so great, indeed, that the work could not have been carried on without the aid of the State, which has been freely given. The new drawings are from nature, and have been made by the best artists, as A. J. Ibbotson and A. Sonrel. The color of the fish has been, in almost every instance, taken from living specimens by J. Burkhardt, an artist of great merit. The delay in the publication of the work has, however, enabled me to give more accurate and highly finished plates, and to correct some errors in the letter press. As but few numbers of the work were distributed previous to the destruction of the original plates, &c, and the present edition is so much improved, I have decided to recall the former numbers and to replace them by those of the new edition." Thus an entirely new work was published. The artistic efforts of Richard were superseded by the superior results of Ibbotson and Sonrel, both excellent artists trained under Agassiz, and T. Sinclair's lithographic establishment of Philadelphia was selected for reproducing the illustrations instead of Tappan & Bradford's of Boston the printing was done by Welch, Bigelow and Company, of Cambridge, in place of Metcalf and Company, and the publishers were "Russell & Jones," in succession to "John Russell," of Charleston, S. C."

He was eccentric in several ways. "One of his eccentricities was followed by a remarkable result. A young waitingman about the house was very liable to fainting fits. In brushing flies at the table he would often exclaim, ' I am going to faint,' and would, if not assisted, fall down in a swoon. The Doctor one day, whilst dissecting the digestive apparatus of a young alligator, called this boy to hold the parts for him, so as to keep the fibers stretched. Just as the Doctor was most interested in tracing some minute muscular fibers, the boy cried out, ' I am going to faint,' and altered the position of his hand, and thus interrupted the dissection at a most important point. The Doctor immediately gave him a sharp slap on the side of his head, saying, ' Well, go faint then, and come back quickly.' The boy did as he was bid, and never fainted after this. He said he ' was cured by holding the alligator.' "

In 1863 his wife died, and he was left childless and alone. When the forces of the Union took possession of Charleston, the medical college in which his collections were preserved was taken for hospital purposes, and his specimens were wantonly thrown away or seized upon for what they were supposed to be worth; his books were stolen, and finally his drawings and manuscripts were lost or destroyed. An old man now, bereft of most of his fortune, discouraged by adversities, and recognizing that a new order of scientific procedure had begun, he reluctantly ceased to even plan for his work. He continued, however, to go in summer to New England, where he had spent his happy youth. Holbrook was elected a member of the American Philosophical Society in 1839 and the National Academy of Sciences in 1868.

On September 8, 1871, stricken by apoplexy, Holbrook died at his sister's residence in Norfolk, Massachusetts, "breathing his last amidst kind and devoted relatives." He is buried in Magnolia Cemetery in Charleston, South Carolina.

== Publications ==
- Holbrook, John Edwards (1842). North American Herpetology; or A Description of the Reptiles Inhabiting the United States. Philadelphia: J. Dobson. http://gallica.bnf.fr/ark:/12148/bpt6k970920.
- Holbrook, John Edwards (1847). Southern Ichthyology; or, a Description of the Fishes inhabiting the Waters of South Carolina, Georgia, and Florida. New York: Wiley & Putnam. 1847. [4to, pp. 1–32, colored plates i-iv. ]
- Holbrook, John Edwards (1860). Ichthyology of South Carolina [Reproduction]. Charleston, South Carolina: Russell. http://gallica.bnf.fr/ark:/12148/bpt6k989901.
- Holbrook, John Edwards (1855). "Fish observed in Florida, Georgia, &c." J. Acad. Nat. Sci. Philadelphia 3 (5): 47–58 + plates v, vi.
- Holbrook, John Edwards, and Reese E. Griffin (1818). John Edwards Holbrook papers, 1819-1860. Travel memoir in two volumes re Holbrook's two years touring Great Britain, 1819-1820, during his four-year visit to Europe; and transcribed letters, 1832-1860. Memoir, 1819-1820, written as a series of lengthy letters in a literary style, addressed to his brother, reporting details of stops at various scientific, educational, and charitable institutions in England, Scotland, Ireland, and Wales, as well as meetings with physicians, educators, politicians, clergymen, and other learned individuals; other portions of the account describe landscapes and natural phenomena, with references to mineral specimens collected en route, and observations re the native population of each locale. Also includes volume, "A Selection of Letters of or Pertaining to John Edwards Holbrook, 1832-1860," transcribed by Reese E. Griffin, Jr., Department of History and Sociology of Science, University of Pennsylvania, typed transcripts from original manuscript collections held by the American Philosophical Society, and the Academy of Natural Sciences, containing correspondence with Achille Valenciennes, Samuel George Morton, Samuel S. Haldeman, George Ord, John E. Gray, Joseph Leidy, John LeConte, Louis Agassiz, and John Vaughan.
- Holbrook, John Edwards, and Reese Edwards Griffin (1900). A selection of letters of or pertaining to John Edwards Holbrook, 1832-1860. S.l: s.n. "The manuscripts on which these transcripts are based are from the collections of the American Philosophical Society (APS), and the Academy of Natural Sciences of Philadelphia (ANSP)".
- Holbrook, John Edwards (1965). Fishes of Florida, Georgia, etc. Charleston: Russell & Jones. Detached from the Journal of the Academy of Natural Sciences of Philadelphia.
