= WildEarth Guardians =

US non-profit organization

- Formation: 1989
- Type: Nonprofit
- Headquarters: Santa Fe, New Mexico, US
- Members: 67,000
- Executive Director: Sean Stevens
- Website: wildearthguardians.org

WildEarth Guardians is a non-profit grassroots environmental organization best known for its decade-long legal action against the US Fish and Wildlife Service, which culminated in 2011 with the Fish and Wildlife Service agreeing to move forward with protection for more than 800 species under the Endangered Species Act.

WildEarth Guardians operates primarily in the Rocky Mountain, Southwest, and Pacific Northwest regions of the United States. As of January 2015, WildEarth Guardians has over 67,000 members. The headquarters are in Santa Fe, New Mexico, with field offices in Denver, Colorado; Portland, Oregon; Missoula, Montana; Boise, Idaho; and Tucson, Arizona. Their legal teams and conservation work are supported by membership donations, private foundations, and government grants and contracts. The 2014 annual budget was about $4.1 million, of which 31% came from 57 private foundations and 30% from individual donations.

The libertarian/conservative political advocacy group Americans for Prosperity estimates that WildEarth Guardians have been winning about 77% of their lawsuits.

== History ==
WildEarth Guardians started as an environmental group calling itself Forest Guardians in 1989 to fight logging on New Mexico's Elk Mountain. Soon Forest Guardians took on other projects such as the public lands livestock grazing industry. They were able to buy leases for public land by outbidding local ranchers. Then they restored the landscape by keeping cattle out, restoring native plants, and removing non-native plants. In 1996 they expanded to take on river issues, particularly the Rio Grande silvery minnow, which was brought to the brink of extinction when drought caused the Rio Grande to dry up for 60 miles. An official endangered species program was launched in 2001, and in 2007 a climate and energy program was started.

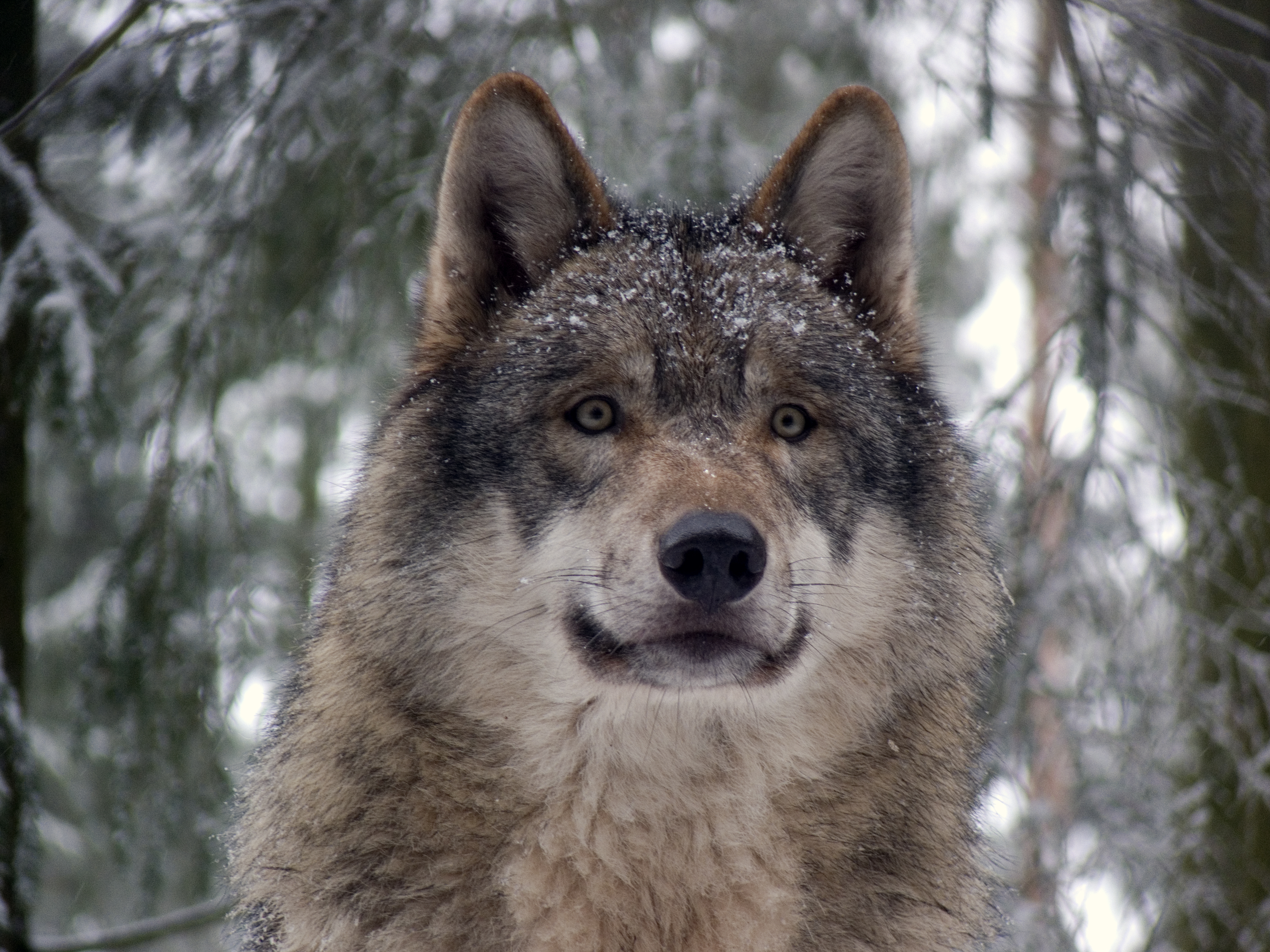
Grey wolf

Forest Guardians became WildEarth Guardians when they merged with Sinapu, a Boulder, Colorado environmental group in 2008.

WildEarth Guardians merged with two environmental groups during 2013, forming a greatly expanded organization that continues under the "WildEarth Guardians" name. Wildlands CPR was based in Montana, US, and had a 20-year history of protecting and resting healthy watersheds from the threats of roads and motorized recreation. The Utah Environmental Congress was Utah's statewide National Forest watchdog, with a 15-year history of activism with respect to logging and road building in National Forests. With these two mergers, the membership of WildEarth Guardians jumped from 20,000 to an estimated 60,000.

== Programs ==
According to its 2014 annual report, the overall mission of WildEarth Guardians is to protect and restore the wildlife, wild places, wild rivers, and health of the American West.

=== Climate and Energy ===
The goal of the Climate and Energy Program is reform that prioritizes energy efficiency and conservation, phases out fossil fuels, and embraces environmentally appropriate clean power sources. WildEarth Guardians activities are focused toward meeting the goal of returning to 350 ppm of carbon dioxide in Earth's atmosphere. WildEarth Guardians has been actively challenging coal mining in the western United States, especially in the Powder River Basin of northeastern Wyoming and southeastern Montana. The Powder River Basin is the largest coal-producing region in the United States. The efforts of the Climate & Energy Program to limit or prevent fracking has thwarted development of 20,000 acres in the Greater Chaco Region of New Mexico. The program is gearing up to defend further hundreds of thousands of acres throughout the American West.

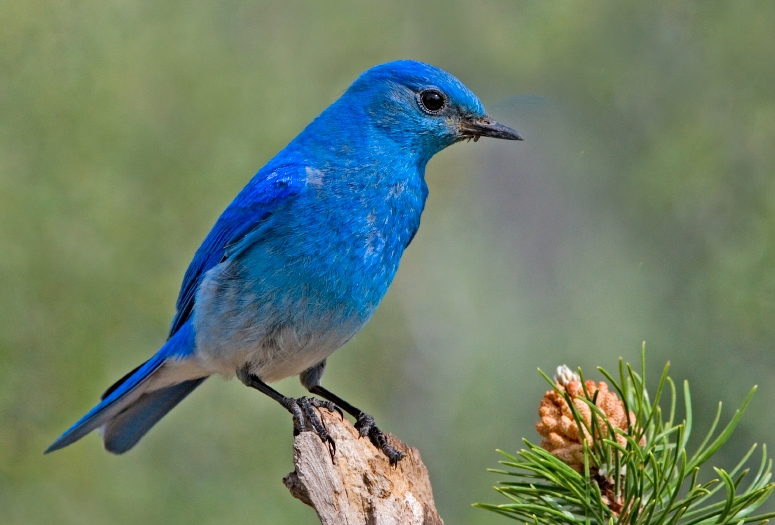
Mountain bluebird

=== Wildlife ===
The Wildlife Program uses legal means to obtain formal listing under the Endangered Species Act (ESA) for species nearing extinction, seeks to protect native carnivores in and restore native carnivores to their natural habitat, and seeks to end the systematic killing of wild animals by state and the federal governments. At the local level within all of North America, this program promotes living with wildlife.

In 2013 this program opened up a new campaign ("Wild Oceans") to persuade the U.S. National Marine Fisheries Service to grant protection to 81 imperiled marine species under the Endangered Species Act.

In 2014 WildEarth Guardians succeeded in obtaining ESA protection for the Canada lynx in all of the lower-48 states of the US.

=== Wild Places ===
WildEarth Guardians Wild Places Program works to ensure that public lands are not destroyed by overdevelopment, overgrazing, or natural resource extraction. They also seek to ensure that these lands remain healthy for the many plants and animals that live on them. In 2012, this program mobilized volunteers to plant 170,000 native trees along seven different rivers. In 2014 volunteers from the Wild Places Program planted more than 100,000 trees on public lands to improve watershed health and wildlife habitat. WAG also completed the first voluntary grazing waiver for the Gila National Forest, giving wolves over 28,000 cow-free acres.

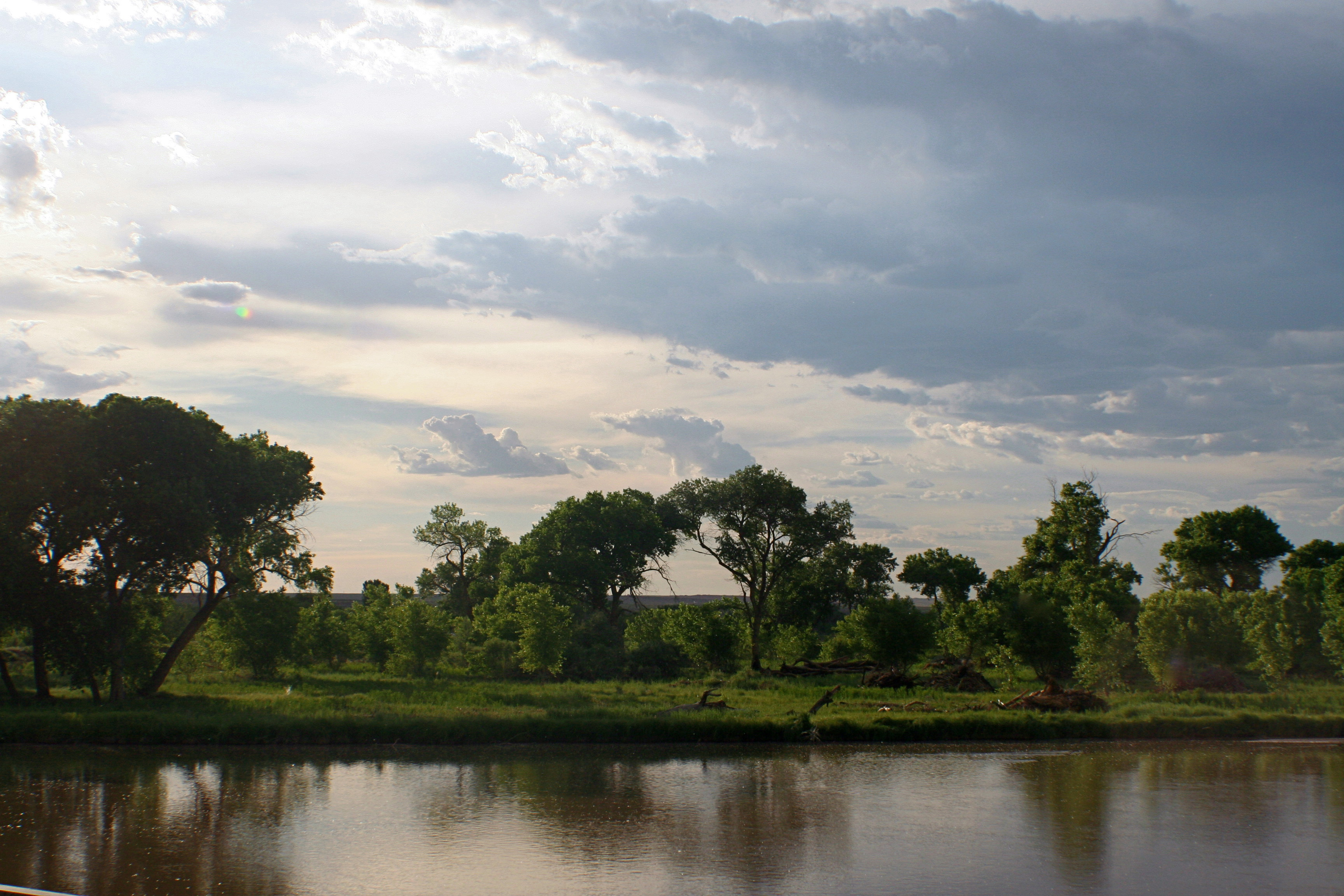
Bosque of the Rio Grande

=== Wild Rivers ===
The main focus of WildEarth Guardians Wild River Program are the endangered rivers of New Mexico. This program seeks to ensure that the rivers contain enough water to ensure a healthy ecosystem in and along the rivers. It works to restore river banks with healthy vegetation in cities, counties, and on private lands. The Wild River Program, working in concert with other organizations, reached an agreement in 2014 with the US Forest Service to safeguard 1.7 million acres of public lands in Utah from oil and gas drilling.

== Controversy ==
In 2009, Fox News commentator and tobacco lobbyist Steven Milloy took notice of the activities of WildEarth Guardians:

WildEarth Guardians and others recently filed suit to block energy exploration on all leases in recent sales in Kansas, New Mexico, Oklahoma, and Texas. Last year, almost 50% of gas leases in the Rocky Mountain states were protested in court.

In 2012, the GOP political advocacy group Americans for Prosperity issued a critical report on the WildEarth Guardians, entitled Monkeywrenching the Courts: How One Green Group Games the System for Headlines and Profit.

[WildEarth Guardians] is relatively new to the green lobbying game, as compared to longer-established players like The Sierra Club or Audubon Society, but it stands out in its eagerness to use litigation as a tool of intimidation, influence and policy-making. In one recent year, as an example, the group cranked out lawsuits at a rate of roughly one per week. ... Equally disturbing is the fact that many of the group’s activities seem aimed at tying federal agencies in knots and generating even more paperwork, diverting funds that could go for conservation and preservation to defending lawsuits and complying with court orders. The direct government support the group receives thus represents only the tip of an extremely large iceberg, which remains largely submerged from public view.

The Americans for Prosperity report concluded that WildEarth Guardians "will continue to present a clear and present danger not just to the court system, and to the Western economy and way of life, but to the taxpayers who unwittingly bankroll its monkey-wrenching of the West."

An economic-impact study by Americans for Prosperity in 2012 said that a total of some $4 billion in economic impacts would result if the WildEarth Guardians were to achieve all of their stated goals with respect to the protection of wildlife through the complete elimination of grazing, coal mining, and drilling on public lands. The study found that these impacts would include:

- 26,200 Western jobs in targeted counties and $1.57 billion in related economic activity due to the anti-drilling campaign;
- an additional 26,104 jobs and $1.75 billion in economic activity due to the Powder River Basin campaign against coal mining;
- and 37,237 farming and ranching jobs and $662 million in local economic activity due to the campaign against grazing cattle on public lands.

According to the US Bureau of Economic Analysis, the 2012 combined Gross State Product of the Rocky Mountain and Southwestern states amounted to $2.4 trillion. In this context, the $4 billion estimated maximum economic impact would have constituted a reduction of just 0.17% ($4 billion / $2.4 trillion) of the total economic activity in the region.

The Wall Street Journal weighed in against the WildEarth Guardians in December 2012, with an opinion piece:

Texas Land Commissioner Jerry Patterson testified to Congress in June that taxpayer money is being spent in litigation over these listings. For instance, the petition to list the Dunes Sagebrush Lizard was originally filed by a radical environmental group, the WildEarth Guardians. Interestingly, this group collected $680,492 in tax money (as grants and the like) from Fish and Wildlife between 2007 and 2011. During that time the group sued the federal agency 76 times over alleged environmental violations. The WildEarth Guardians are also behind the petition to list the Spot-Tailed Earless Lizard under the Endangered Species Act. Not coincidentally, the range of this particular lizard includes portions of the Eagle Ford Shale in Texas, which is emerging as one of the top oil- and gas-producing regions in the country.
