= Holbrookia approximans =

Speckled earless lizard

Scientific classification
- Domain: Eukaryota
- Kingdom: Animalia
- Phylum: Chordata
- Class: Reptilia
- Order: Squamata
- Suborder: Iguania
- Family: Phrynosomatidae
- Genus: Holbrookia
- Species: H. approximans

Binomial name
- Holbrookia approximans Baird, 1858

Synonyms
- Holbrookia approximans Baird, 1858; Holbrookia maculata approximans — H.M. Smith, 1935; Holbrookia approximans — Webb, 1984

Species of lizard

Holbrookia approximans, the speckled earless lizard, is a species of earless lizard which is found in the Southwestern United States and northern Mexico. It is sometimes referred to as the western earless lizard.

== Taxonomy ==
The speckled earless lizard has been elevated to full species status as Holbrookia approximans.

== Description ==
The speckled earless lizard is an overall gray-brown in color, with black and white speckling all along its back, with a solid gray-brown underside. It has distinct black and white bars immediately preceding the hind legs. Males tend to have a blue coloration to the white bars, whereas females do not. Like all species of earless lizards, it has no external ear openings.

== Behavior ==
Like all species of earless lizards, the speckled earless lizard is diurnal and insectivorous. It prefers sandy, grassland habitats with sparse vegetation. It tends to be a nervous, wary species that flees quickly if approached.
