= Mustang Island State Park =

State park in Texas, United States

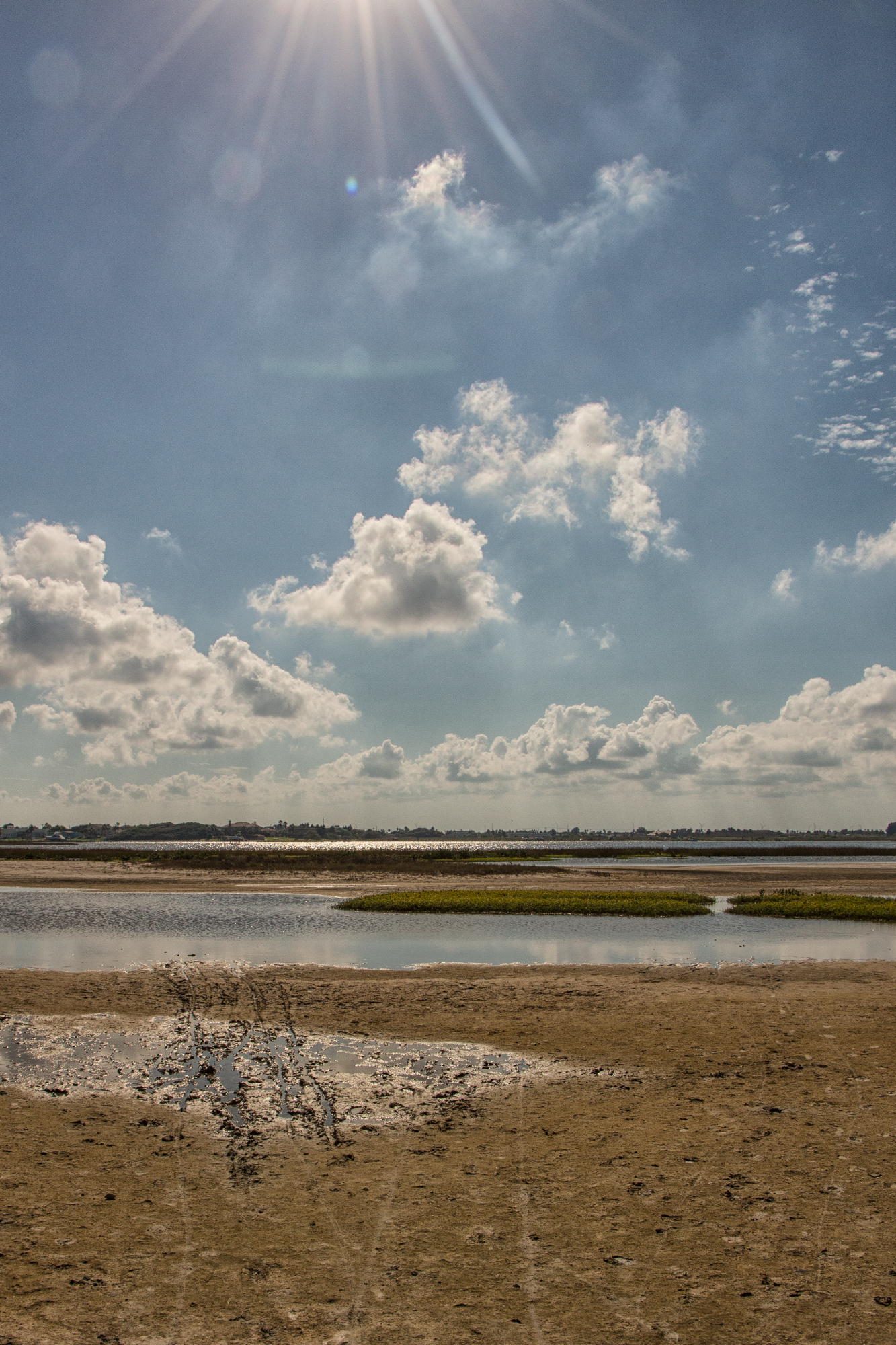
- Mustang Island State Park, October 2016

- Location within Texas Location within the United States
- Location: Nueces County, Texas
- Nearest city: Port Aransas
- Coordinates: 27.67531°N 97.17693°W
- Area: 3,954 acres (1,600 ha)
- Created: 1972-1979
- Visitors: 173,272 (in 2025)
- Governing body: Texas Parks and Wildlife Department
- Website: Official site

Mustang Island State Park is a 3,954 acres (1,600 ha) state park located on Mustang Island south of the city of Port Aransas in Nueces County, Texas, United States. The park is on the coast of the Gulf of Mexico and has a 5-mile (8.0 km) beachfront. The park opened to the public in 1979 and is managed by the Texas Parks and Wildlife Department.

== History ==
Mustang Island is believed to have formed around 2,500 years ago as sand and other sediments built up sandbars. The island takes its name from wild mustangs that roamed the island which eventually succumbed to ranching in the late 1800s.

The earliest known inhabitants of Mustang Island were Karankawa Indians. The Karankawas were a hunter-gatherer people and lived off the shellfish and mussels they caught in the Gulf.

The first known historical record of Mustang Island was made by Alonso Álvarez de Pineda, a Spanish explorer who charted the island in 1519. A fort was built on Mustang Island during the Mexican–American War, 1846–48, to guard the entrance to Aransas Bay. Records show that an Englishman named Robert A. Mercer and one H. L. Kinney both ran cattle on Mustang Island in the 1850s. During the Civil War, the coastal area was blockaded by the Union Navy, but the conflict ended with no major battles occurring in the area.

The area was later bought by Sam Wilson Jr., husband of the eccentric Ada Wilson. With the help of Sissy Farenthold, the state of Texas bought the land in 1972 and developed the park.

== Nature ==
=== Animals ===
The island's fauna is dominated by small species such as Texas pocket gopher, Hispid cotton rat, spotted ground squirrel, eastern cottontail, black-tailed jackrabbit, Virginia opossum, keeled earless lizard, squirrel tree frog, and Gulf Coast toad and their predators like coyote, bobcat, western diamondback rattlesnake, western coachwhip and glossy snake. Large numbers of waterfowl and shorebirds are common, as well as white-tailed hawk and a large variety of songbirds, most of which are migratory.

=== Plants ===
Mustang Island is a coastal barrier island dependent upon sand dunes for protection from storms and the sea. The vegetation holding the dunes in place are drought-resistant species such as sea oats, and beach morning glory.

== Activities ==
The park offers camping among 48 water and electric sites and 300 drive-up primitive sites, picnicking, kayaking with access to the Mustang Island Paddling Trail, fishing, swimming, hiking mountain biking, sunbathing, and birdwatching with over 400 bird species identified here.

== See also ==
- List of Texas state parks
