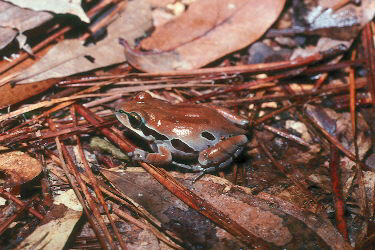

Conservation status
- Least Concern (IUCN 3.1)

Scientific classification
- Kingdom: Animalia
- Phylum: Chordata
- Class: Amphibia
- Order: Anura
- Family: Hylidae
- Genus: Pseudacris
- Species: P. ornata

Binomial name
- Pseudacris ornata (Holbrook, 1836)

Synonyms
- Rana ornata Holbrook, 1836; Cystignathus ornatus Holbrook, 1842; Chorophilus ornatus LeConte, 1855; Pseudacris ornata Stejneger & Barbour, 1917

= Ornate chorus frog =

Species of amphibian

The ornate chorus frog (Pseudacris ornata) is a species of chorus frog endemic to the Southeastern United States. Their distribution ranges from North Carolina, east to the very eastern part of Louisiana, and south to northern parts of Florida.

== Description ==
It is 25–38 mm (1–1.5 in) in head-body length, with the record size being 4 cm. Its color varies depending on locale: normally having a reddish-brown or gray color, but a rare dominant allele can turn their background color bright green. They can even be a pinkish color. It typically has a defined but broken stripe or spots leading from the nose down the side. The frog's upper lip is marked with a clear light colored line and many individuals have a faded triangle marking on the very top of the head. It has a pure white belly, and usually has yellow spots located in front of the hind legs.

== Habitat ==
Most commonly found in the Southern coastal plain. The ornate chorus frog is typically found in xeric habitats, including pine stands, sandhills, and pine savannahs. Woodland ponds, flooded fields, and roadside ditches can serve as breeding habitat, although ponds found within sandhills, and pine forests or plantations observe the most breeding. A site with an open canopy and herbaceous vegetation is also common for breeding. These frogs require seasonally flooded wetlands without fish for a three to four month period for tadpoles to develop completely.

== Behavior ==
These chorus frogs are nocturnal and are rarely seen, except during mating season. They become more active as the temperature begins to decrease and begin migrating toward water for the mating season. Most observations of this frog are on winter nights during or after rain. Because of this, little is known about the adult ornate chorus frog. They spend the remainder of the spring and summer waiting out the warm temperatures in burrows, under logs, or buried under sandy soil. They will sometimes even call for mates while fully buried underground.

They are a fossorial species that uses their forelimbs in order to burrow into the substrate. This is a unique behavior because most burrowing frogs will dig backwards with their hind limbs. One study suggests that this method of forward burrowing may have evolved to facilitate subterranean feeding. They prefer to burrow in easily penetrated sandy soils and will occasionally communicate underground through vocalizations.

== Predator and prey relationships ==
Ornate chorus frogs are insectivores, eating small insects and larvae, as well as worms and other small invertebrates. These frogs are prey mainly to snakes, but also birds and sometimes raccoons. Because the ornate chorus frog is most active during the winter months, they are able to avoid many snake predators due to them already beginning their hibernation. The eggs and tadpoles can be preyed upon by fish, which is why these frogs prefer ephemeral ponds and wetlands to breed and lay their eggs Their dark markings and tendency for body coloring to vary depending on their habitat allows them a layer of camouflage as a defense tactic. However, even with this defense mechanism it has been observed that these frogs rarely live for longer than one to two breeding cycles because of predation. Adult mortality may also be due to intraspecies fighting.

== Reproduction ==
Ornate chorus frogs reach sexual maturity around 1 year and reproduce through external fertilization. The female releases eggs at the same time that the male releases sperm and to ensure that the eggs are fertilized, they will sit in an axillary amplexus position. They mate from November to March. Males and females can mate with multiple individuals. Eggs are laid in clusters ranging from 10 to 100 eggs attached to submerged vegetation. The eggs are abandoned after and neither parent provides any type of parental care to the eggs or hatched tadpoles. The eggs hatch between 1 and 2 weeks but hatch time is temperature dependent; colder temperatures indicate a longer period before hatching. Colder temperatures can lead to larger size at metamorphosis though. After hatching, tadpoles have two yellow stripes on the sides of a dark back, as well as a high tail fin. Some may have a bicolored tail. It can take between two and four months for tadpoles to fully develop into frogs, with temperature playing a role in development time and frequency of color morphs. The ratio of gray to brown morphs in a family is influenced by density and temperature at which tadpoles are grown.

== Taxonomy ==
The ornate chorus frog (Pseudacris ornata) was named and classified by American herpetologist John Edwards Holbrook in 1836. They are officially in the Fat Frog clade.

== Etymology ==
The name of the genus, Pseudacris, comes from the Greek pseudes (false) and akris (locust), probably a reference to the repeated rasping trill of most chorus frogs, which is similar to that of the insect. The specific name, ornata, is the feminine form of the Latin adjective, ornatus (decorated).

== Conservation ==
While listed as "Least Concern" by the IUCN, research suggests that more than 36% of historic ornate chorus frog populations are possibly extirpated from their original range or experiencing population decline, with a low probability of persistence. Those populations that are extirpated occur in every state within the species' distribution and occur notably around the margins of their ranges. Populations that are currently extant and within protected areas or in areas with high habitat suitability have a higher probability of persistence.
