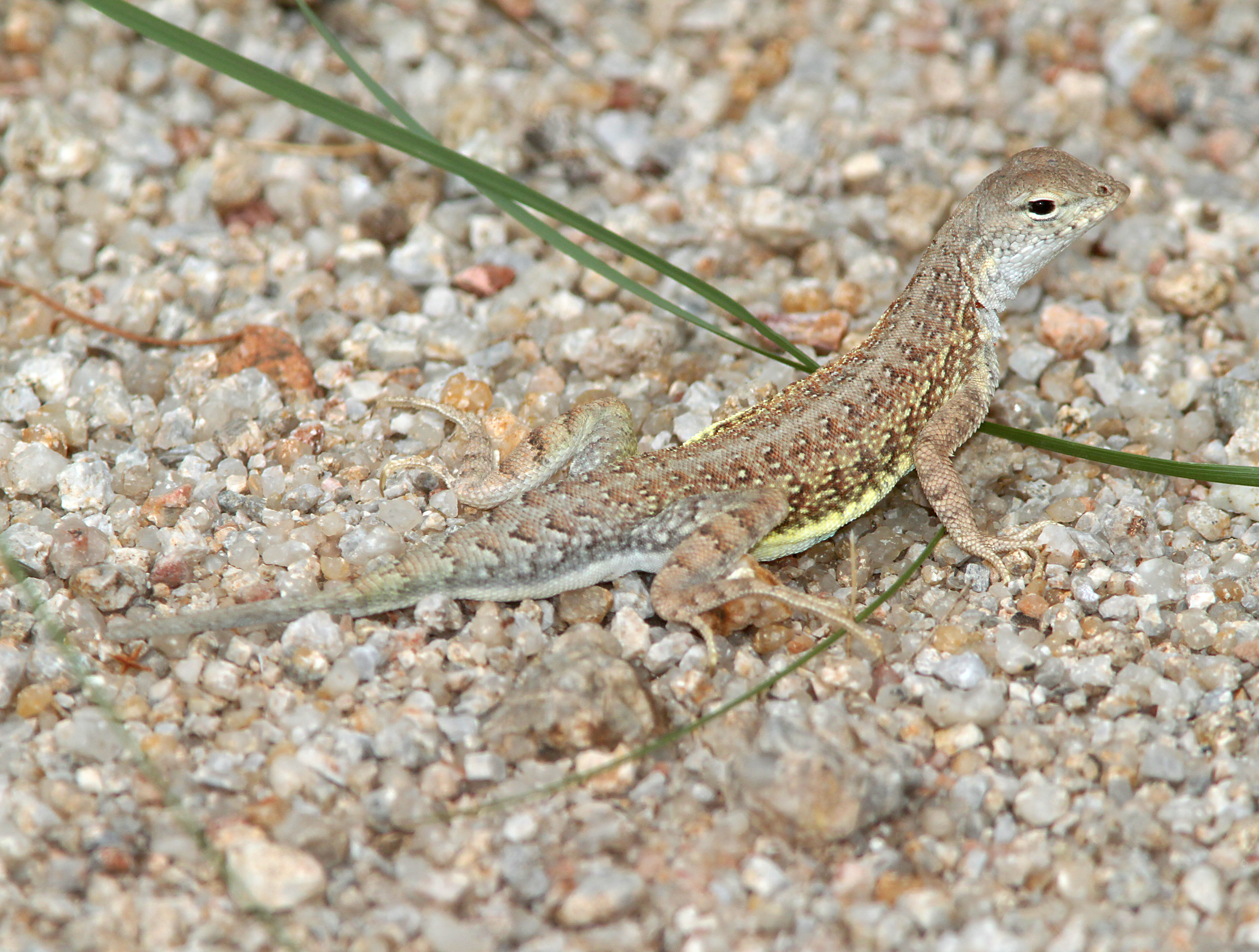

Conservation status
- Least Concern (IUCN 3.1)

Scientific classification
- Kingdom: Animalia
- Phylum: Chordata
- Class: Reptilia
- Order: Squamata
- Suborder: Iguania
- Family: Phrynosomatidae
- Genus: Holbrookia
- Species: H. elegans

Binomial name
- Holbrookia elegans Bocourt, 1874

= Holbrookia elegans =

Species of lizard in North America

Holbrookia elegans, the elegant earless lizard, is a species of lizard native to the United States and Mexico.

== Description ==
It is a small lizard, about 3 in (76 mm) long and is gray or tan. The tail length is longer than the body's.
