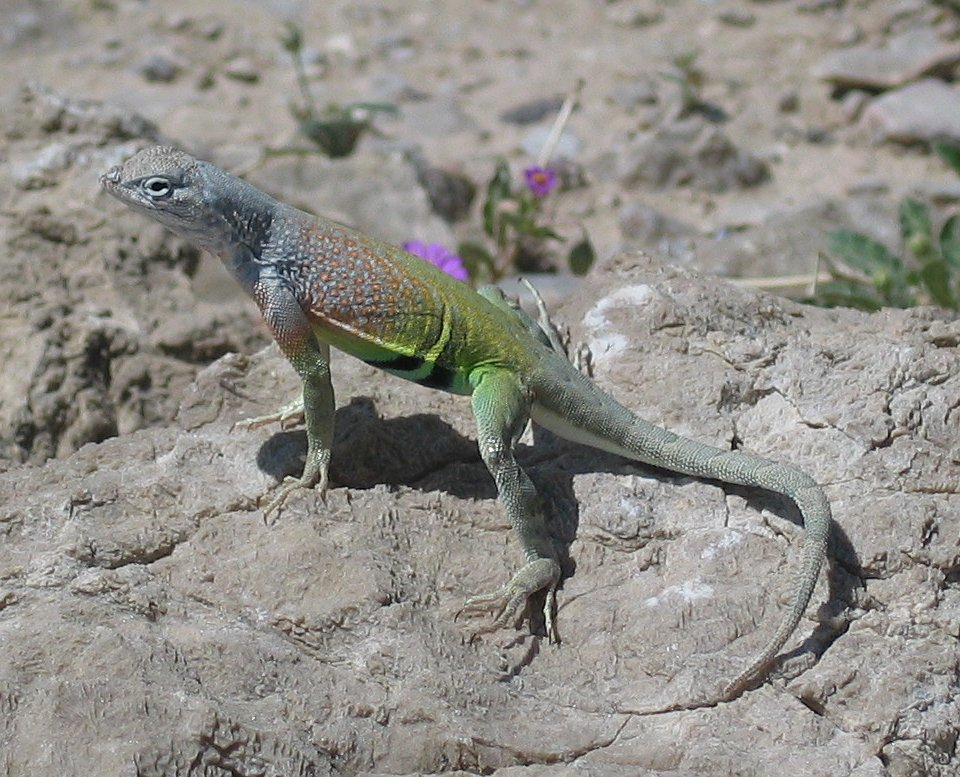
- Cophosaurus texanus (male)

Conservation status
- Least Concern (IUCN 3.1)

Scientific classification
- Kingdom: Animalia
- Phylum: Chordata
- Class: Reptilia
- Order: Squamata
- Suborder: Iguania
- Family: Phrynosomatidae
- Genus: Cophosaurus; Troschel, 1852
- Species: C. texanus

Binomial name
- Cophosaurus texanus Troschel, 1852

= Greater earless lizard =

Species of lizard

The greater earless lizard (Cophosaurus texanus) is the only species in the monotypic genus Cophosaurus. It is closely related to the smaller, lesser earless lizards and other species in the genus Holbrookia, and in fact was placed in that genus and referred to Holbrookia texana from 1852 into the 1970s. Earless lizards lack external ear openings, an adaptation to burrowing in the sand, as are the recessed lower jaw and flared upper labial scales. Greater earless lizards are sexually dimorphic, males grow larger and are more colorful than females, exhibiting pink and green colors that are particularly bright in the breeding season. Two bold black bars mark the lateral region of males but are greatly reduced and vague, or occasionally entirely absent in females.

The greater earless lizard is native to the Chihuahua Desert and other arid and semi-arid regions of Southwestern United States and northern Mexico, where they most often occupy moderately open areas of sparse vegetation with rocks, gravel, and sand. The overall color of individual lizards frequently match the colors of the rocks and soils of the local area they inhabit. They will often rely on camouflage and their speed to elude threats and predators before retreating into rock crevices. They are primarily insectivores, preying on wide variety of crickets, grasshoppers, caterpillars, ants, flies, beetles, and bugs. Spiders and small lizards are occasionally eaten as well. Cophosaurus are oviparous. Females lay 1 to 4 clutches of 2 – 9 eggs a year, with hatchlings emerging from June to October, and reaching adult size and sexual maturity in one year.

== Etymology ==
The generic name Cophosaurus is derived from the Greek words copho (κουφός), meaning "deaf", and saurus, meaning "lizard", in reference to the animal's absent external ear openings. The trivial name, or specific epithet texanus, is a toponym in reference to the state of Texas, the original location where the specimens used in the lizard's description were collected. The subspecific names are both Latin, reticulatus, meaning "reticulated" or a "net-like" pattern, and scitulus, meaning "handsome" or "pretty".

== Taxonomy ==
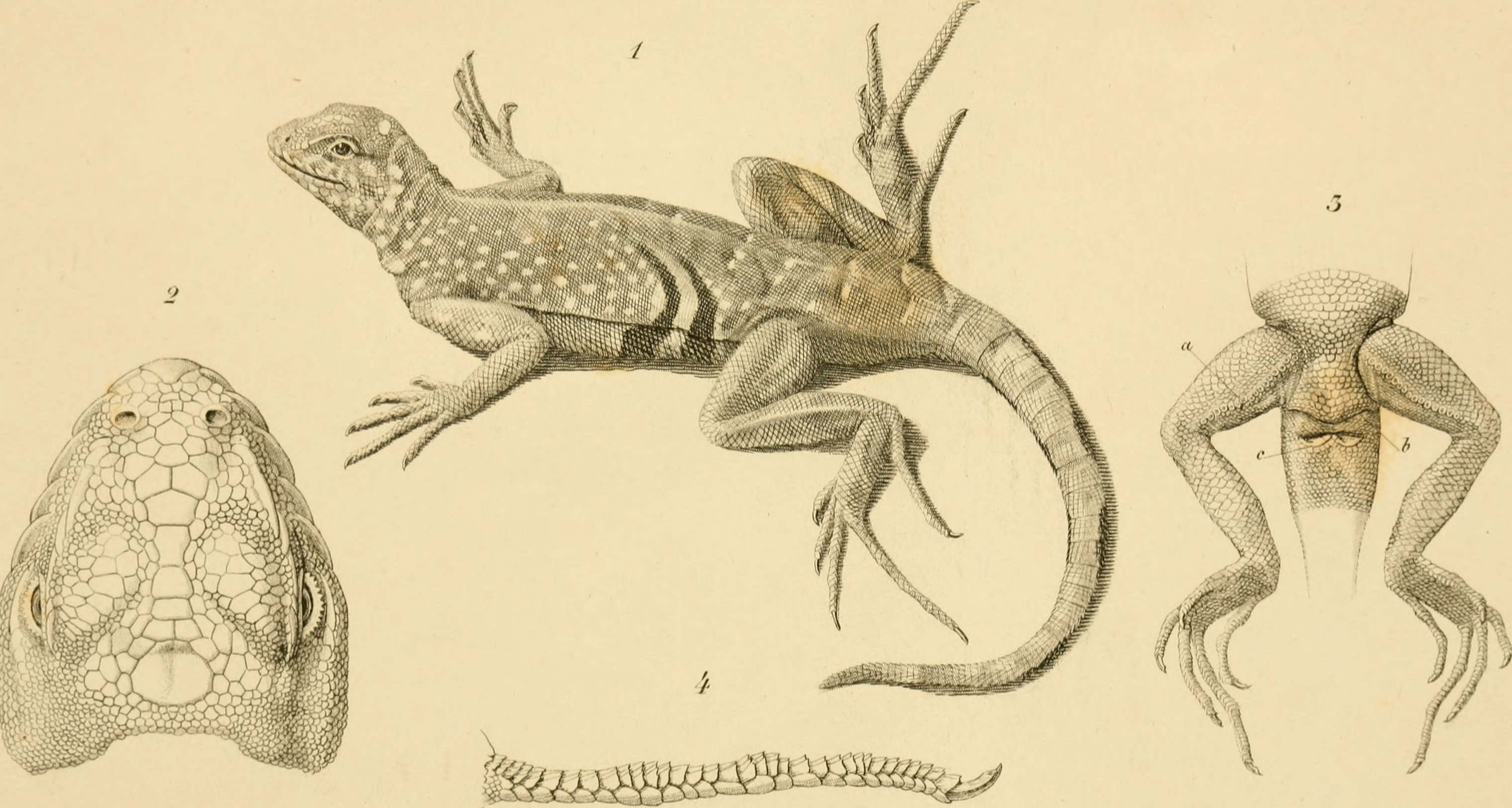
Illustration of Cophosaurus texanus that was published in Troschel's original description of the species dated 1850.

Within the family Phrynosomatidae, Cophosaurus is most closely related to the zebra-tailed (Callisaurus), lesser earless (Holbrookia) and fringe-toed lizards (Uma), collectively forming the tribe Callisaurini, commonly referred to as the sand lizards. The genus Cophosaurus is monotypic, as Cophosaurus texanus is the only species within the genus. Franz Hermann Troschel described Cophosaurus (as well as the species C. texanus) in a paper dated to 1850 (but not published until 1852). Later, that same year, the species was transferred to the genus Holbrookia in a review by Spencer Fullerton Baird and Charles Frédéric Girard, and subsequent literature used the name H. texana for well-over a century. Troschel's description was based on two specimens, cotypes or syntypes, both lost in the Second World War. In 1951, James A. Peters published a review of the species, recognizing three subspecies and designating a neotype for C. t. texanus, although still placing them in the genus Holbrookia. In a 1958 Ph.D. dissertation reviewing the genus Holbrookia, herpetologist Ralph W. Axtell omitted H. texana with little comment, something which was noted by Robert F. Clarke in his 1965 Ph.D. dissertation (subsequently placing the species back in the original genus, Cophosaurus). Both combinations, C. texanus and H. texana, were used by various authors during the 1970s, although, despite arguments for the placement of the species in Holbrookia, Cophosaurus was in predominant use by the 1980s; later allozymes analyses supported the recognition of the genus.

Three subspecies are currently recognized (2022), with standardized English names.

- Texas greater earless lizard, Cophosaurus texanus texanus, Troschel 1852 [1850]
- Sonoran greater earless lizard, Cophosaurus texanus reticulatus, (Peters 1951)
- Chihuahuan greater earless lizard, Cophosaurus texanus scitulus, (Peters 1951)

== Description ==
The greater earless lizard is a medium-sized lizard (relative to other species in its range) and the largest of the earless lizards. A range of sizes have been reported by various authors: Texas greater earless lizard (C. t. texanus), males 8.3–18.1 cm (3.3–7.1 in), females 7–14.3 cm (2.8–5.6 in); Chihuahuan greater earless lizard (C. t. scitulus), males 9–18.4 cm (3.5–7.2 in), females 6.7–13.5 cm (2.6–5.3 in) in total lengths are representative of the species.

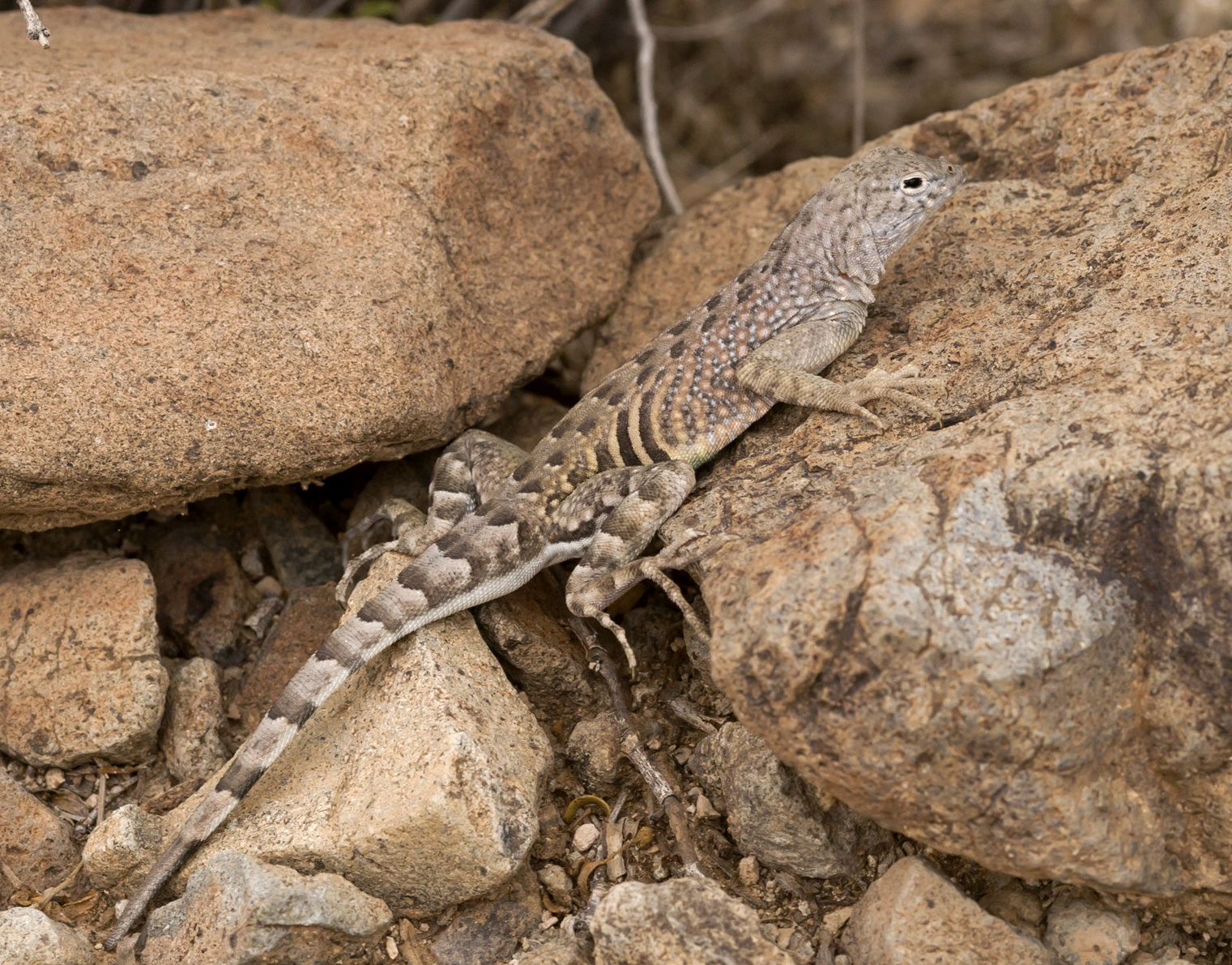
Chihuahuan greater earless lizard (C. t. scitulus), male, Doña Ana County, New Mexico (19 Sept 2015)

Greater earless lizards do not have external ear openings. The scales on the body are small and granular, with the dorsal scales slightly smaller than the ventral scales. Their legs, particularly the hind legs, are relatively long. The tail is slightly flattened and longer than head and body combined. The underside of the tail is white with 5 to 9 (usually 6 or 7) bold, contrasting black bands (excluding individuals with regenerated tails). The base color can be various shades of grays, browns, tans, or reddish brown and generally close to the prevailing colors of the local substrate. Cophosaurus texanus is a sexually dimorphic species, in addition to size differences, males and females differ in some aspects of colors and markings. Most noticeable in males are a pair of black bands located on the posterior third on the sides of the body, rising from two blue patches on the margins of the belly up sides and arching forward and ending before meeting on the back. The body anterior to the black bands is suffused with some shade of pink, orange, or red, and the body posterior to the black bands tented green, aqua-green, or lime-green. The colors are most prominent in the Chihuahuan greater earless lizard (C. t. scitulus) and are greatly enhanced and most noticeable in the breeding season in all subspecies. In parts of their range they are colloquially referred to as "the lizard with the pink shirt and green pants." In contrast, females either lack the black lateral bands entirely or they are very faint and indistinct. Females and young often exhibit a lateral white or near white stripe running between the forelimbs and hind limbs and on the back of the legs.

The subspecies were diagnosed in the original description with the following characters. Cophosaurus t. texana: typically, 80–86%, have 79 ventral scales or less from collar (last gular fold) to anus, 40 or more scales in head length, and 27 or less total femoral pores. Cophosaurus t. scitula: 80–84% have 80 or more ventral scales, 39 or less head scales, 28 or more femoral pores. Cophosaurus t. reticulata: 85–100% have 82 ventral scales, 36 or less head scales, less than 31 femoral pores, and the black lateral bars are faint and do not extend above the lateral fold in males.

== Distribution ==
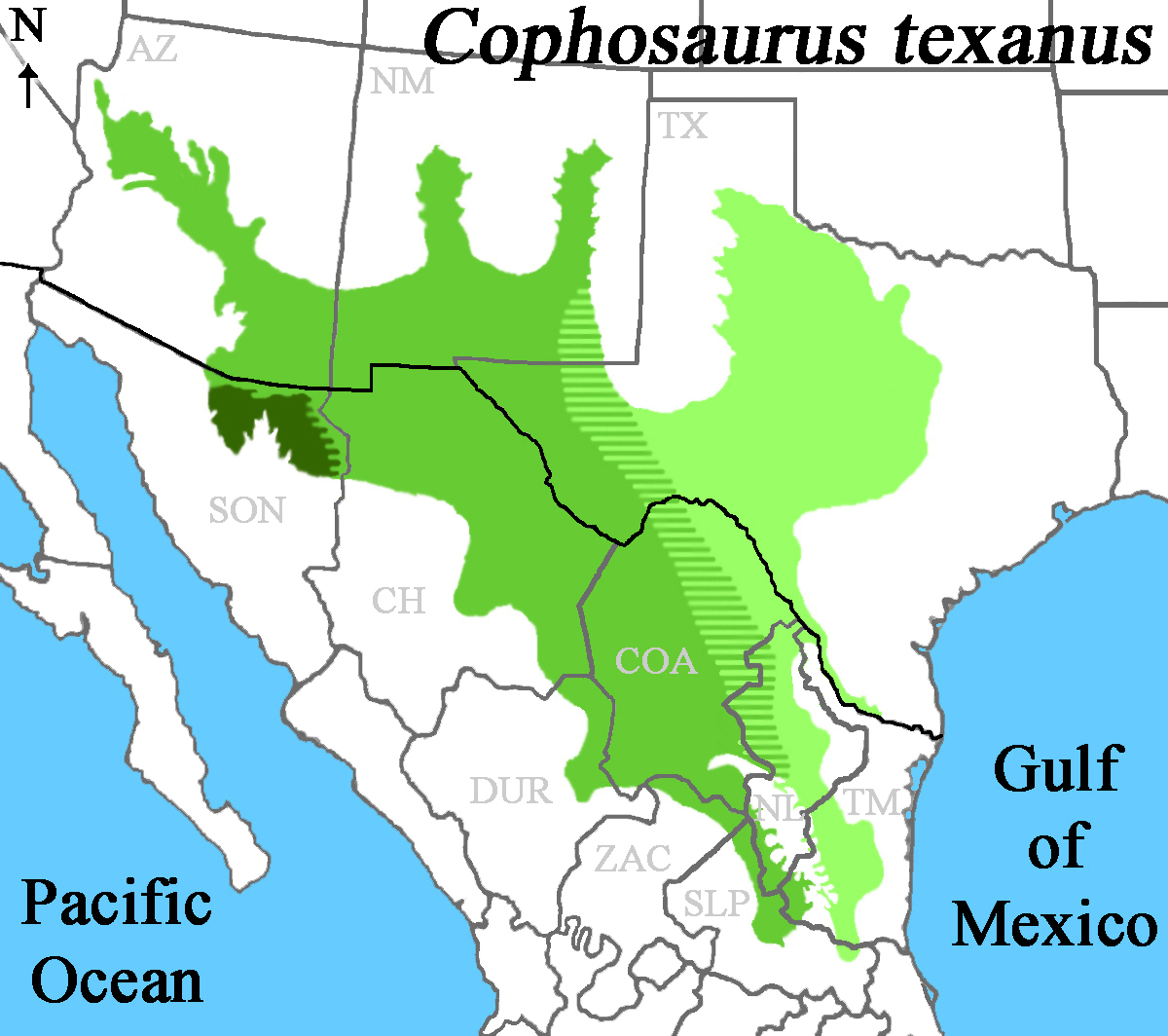
Distribution of the greater earless lizard: Cophosaurus texanus texanus = light green; C. t. scitulus = mid green; C. t. reticulatus = dark greem; hatching = integration zones

The greater earless lizard occurs in the southwestern United States (Arizona, New Mexico, and Texas) and northern Mexico (Chihuahua, Coahuila, Durango, Nuevo León, San Luis Potosí, Sonora, Tamaulipas, and Zacatecas). Elevations ranging from 127 to 2100 meters have been reported.

The Texas greater earless lizard (C. t. texanus) occurs on the Edwards Plateau of Central Texas and northward to the state border with Oklahoma and southeastern areas of the Texas panhandle. It ranges southward into the Tamaulipan mezquital ecoregion, and along the Rio Grande into northeast Coahuila and north-central Nuevo León, Mexico. In south-central Tamaulipas, its occurrence becomes increasingly spotty and localized, with records just across the southern state line in eastern San Luis Potosí. Several accounts have commented on the problematic and poorly defined zone of integration between the subspecies C. t. texanus and C. t. scitulu.

The Chihuahuan greater earless lizard (C. t. scitulus) occurs throughout much of the Chihuahuan Desert, including much of the Trans-Pecos region of West Texas, the southern third of New Mexico (following the Pecos and Rio Grande river basins northward), and southeastern Arizona (east of the Sonora Desert), following a zone of semi-arid habitats around the northeastern margins of the Sonoran Desert almost to the California border. In Mexico, it ranges into northeastern Chihuahua, much of Coahuila, northeastern Durango, extreme northeastern Zacatecas, extreme southern Nuevo León, northern San Luis Potosí, and extreme southwestern Tamaulipas. It is absent from higher elevations in the Sierra Madre Oriental, however it does range deeper into the canyons and valleys on both the eastern and western versants of the mountain range.

The Sonoran greater earless lizard (C. t. reticulatus) is endemic to northeastern Sonora, Mexico, between 470 – 1300 meters, where, as recently as 2016, it was reportedly known from only eight localities.

== Ecology and natural history ==
=== Reproduction ===
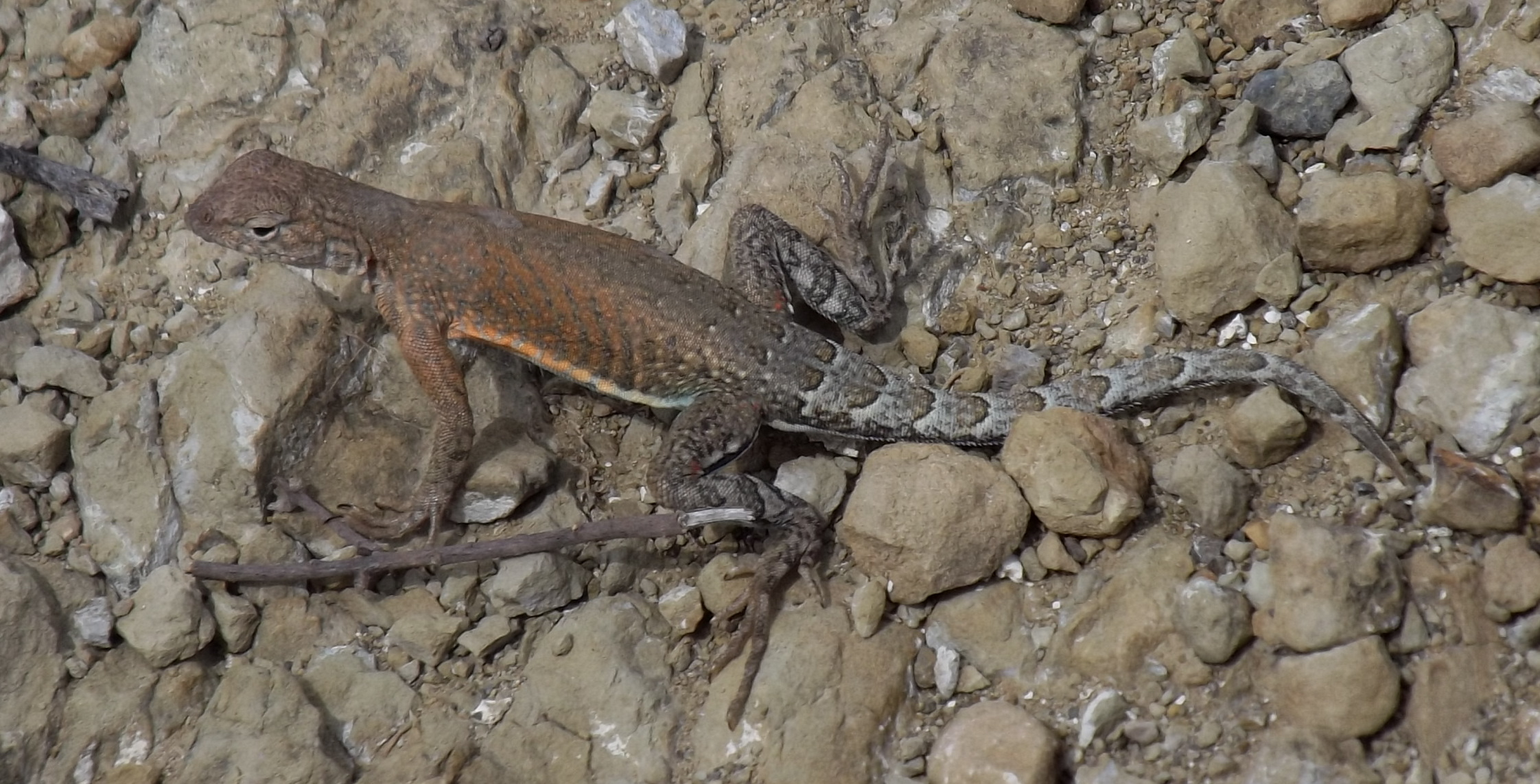
Chihuahuan greater earless lizard (Cophosaurus t. scitulus), female, municipality of General Cepeda, Coahuila, Mexico (27 March 2013)

The longevity of the greater earless lizard is typically 3 years, but records of individuals surviving five reproductive seasons in the wild have been documented. Both males and females reach adult size in a year, attaining maturity and mating before their second winter. Mating occurs from April to August, peaking between late April and early July. Gravid females often exhibit pink, orange or yellow colors on their throats and sides. In one study, gravid females were only found in May and June. Multiple clutches, up to four a year, are scattered over a wide area, with clutch size ranging from 2 to 9 eggs (average 3-5); more mature females produce larger clutches than younger females. One study reported finding single eggs buried in the sand on three occasions, but never locating a clutch. The incubation period is about 50 days. The hatchlings emerge from June to October, with reports of sizes varying from 20 to 25 mm. to 26–31 mm. snout–vent length.

=== Diet ===
The greater earless lizard is predominantly an insectivore and a generalist. A study in Mohave County, Arizona found insects comprised 85% of the diet, including 18.2% Orthoptera (crickets, grasshoppers, locusts), 15.8% Hymenoptera (ants, bees, sawflies, wasps), and 10.1% Lepidoptera (butterflies and moths), 9.2% Diptera (flies), 9.2% Coleoptera (beetles), and 8.4% Hemiptera (true bugs). Spiders made up 7.9% of the diet and Cophosaurus were found to occasionally feed on small lizards, particularly ornate tree lizards (Urosaurus ornatus), in the late summer and early spring when hatchling emerged and were abundant. Another study conducted in the Mapimí Biosphere Reserve in Durango, Mexico, found the most frequent prey items were spiders, Hymenoptera, Lepidopteran (caterpillars) adult and nymph Orthoptera, beetles, and true bugs. Less frequent prey identified in these studies included Neuroptera (lacewings, mantidflies, antlions), mites, pseudoscorpions, termites, Homoptera, adult Lepidoptera, and Odonata (dragonflies, damselflies) The Arizona study found that plants made up 5.5% of the diet, while the Durango study found only two cases of plant ingestion and interpret them as accidental intake. The most common, or highest percentage of prey items (e.g. Hymenoptera, caterpillars, etc.) in the diet were found to change annually in the Durango study.

Cophosaurus use a sit-and-wait foraging strategy, often situating themselves on a high vantage point such as a rock, bolder, or fallen limb, in a relatively open space and dashing out to take passing insects. They have been observed leaping into the air or at low-hanging vegetation to catch their prey. In one study, months with rain were significantly correlated with an increase of arthropods in the environment and in the dietary intake of the lizards. There was not a significant deference in the diet of males and females. Competition for food between adults and juveniles, as well as other species of sympatric lizards is at least partially alleviated by resource partitioning, determined by differences in body size and jaw length.

=== Habitat ===
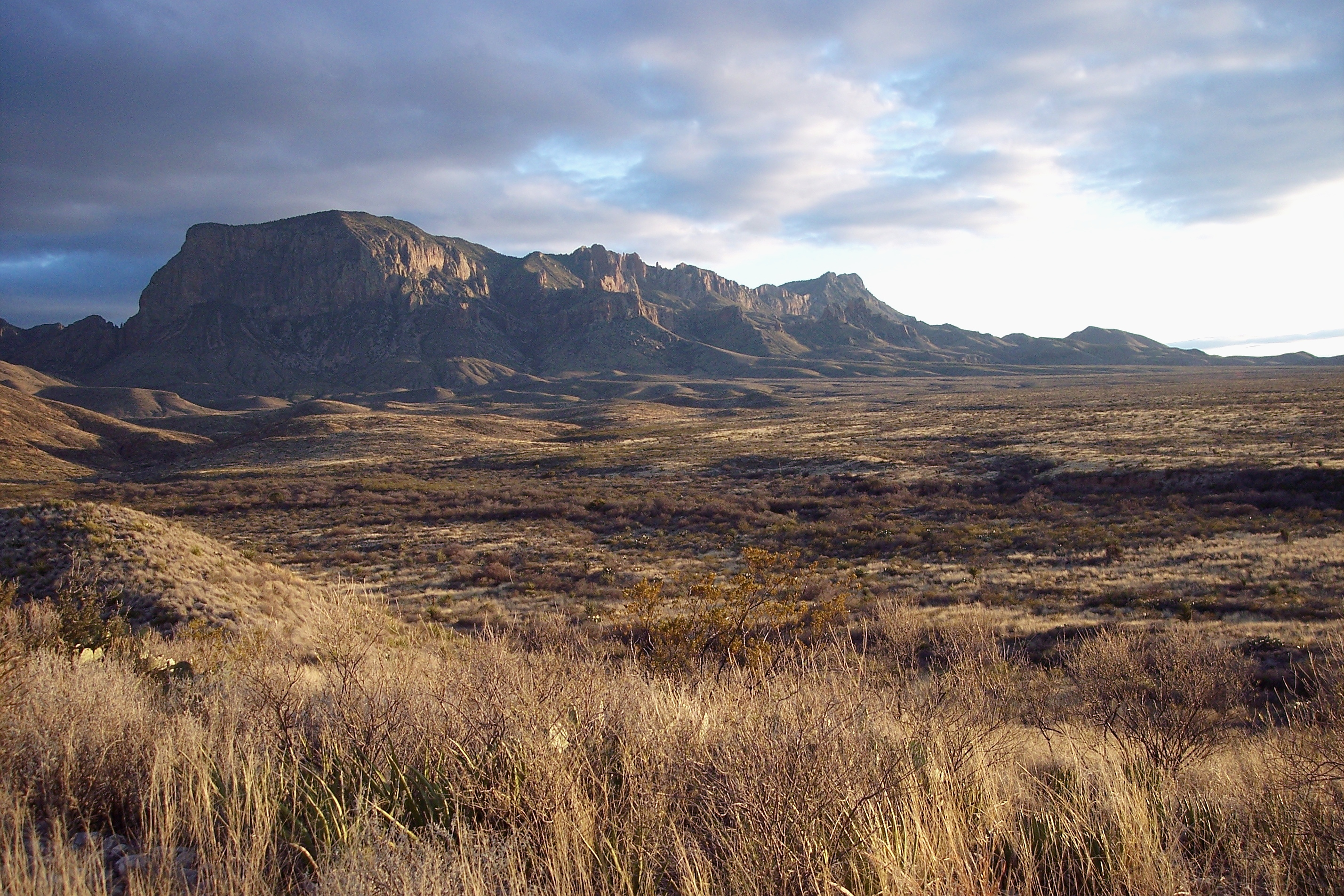
Big Bend National Park in the Chihuahuan Desert, where greater earless lizards tend to occupy gulches, arroyos, and rocky areas of sparse vegetation.

The greater earless lizard native to the arid environment of the Chihuahua Desert, extending into western areas of the Tamaulipan mezquital, and the northeastern margins of the Meseta Central matorral, as well as the semi-arid Edwards Plateau and Central Great Plains in Texas, and the Arizona transition zone (between the Sonoran Desert and Arizona Mountains forests) in the west.

Within these ecoregions it typically occupies open scrubland and areas of sparse vegetation, with rocks and boulder. Limestone ledges and outcrops near streams with boulders and crevices, and dry gulches, arroyos, and canyons with alluvium deposits of silt, sand, gravel, and rocks are often preferred, but it is not strictly limited to these areas. Gentle to moderate slopes of limestone and gravel and hills of granite and igneous rock are also habitat for the lizard. Plants identified in association with greater earless lizards include honey mesquite (Prosopis glandulosa), creosote bush (Larrea tridentata), ocotillo (Fouquieria splendens), sotol (Dasylirion), lechuguilla (Agave lecheguilla), prickly pear cactus (Opuntia), leatherstem (Jatropha dioica), and candelilla (Euphorbia antisyphilitica).

The color of an individual lizard often bears a striking correlation to the prevailing colors of the rocks and substrates where it lives: e.g. specimens from Llano County, Texas have been noted for their rusty brown color similar to the red granite characteristic of much of the Llano Uplift. Cophosaurus can be locally abundant and among the most common species of herpetofauna in some areas, and yet absent from seemingly appropriate habitat other areas.

=== Behavior ===
Greater earless lizards are diurnal, with most populations exhibiting a bimodal daily activity pattern, peeking late in the morning, followed by a period of reduced activity in the afternoon heat, and a second activity period in the late afternoon. They have a high optimum temperature range, typical active body is 37–41 °C (99–106 °F). At night, Cophosaurus will often burrow in loose sand as deep as 15.3 cm. (6 in.) or in areas without sand, they may partially bury in loose gravel or shale, or sleep on the surface. Females have been found communally buried under shale on cold winter days.

They are predominantly ground-dwelling lizards that often seek a high perch, such as a protruding rock, to survey their area for passing prey and approaching predators. They are reluctant to retreat into crevices or borrows to evade predators, but instead will run from one rock to another with great speed, or rapidly dash a few yards only to make an abrupt stop and then freeze, at which point their remarkable camouflage seems to make them disappear. Cophosaurus are known to engage in bipedal locomotion (running on two feet) during short burst of speed.

Males, females, and even hatchlings only five minutes old exhibit territorial displays including head bobbing, pushups, lateral body compression. Another conspicuous behavior is the habit of lifting its tail and curling it over its back while running and waving the striking black and white banded tail in the air, diverting attention away from the head and body to the relatively expendable tail. The practice of curling the tail over the body while of running also serves a functional purpose as a counter-balance, shifting the center of gravity closer to the force exerted by the lizard's rear legs. A 32% decrease in running speed was reported for lizards that had lost their tails.

== Gallery ==
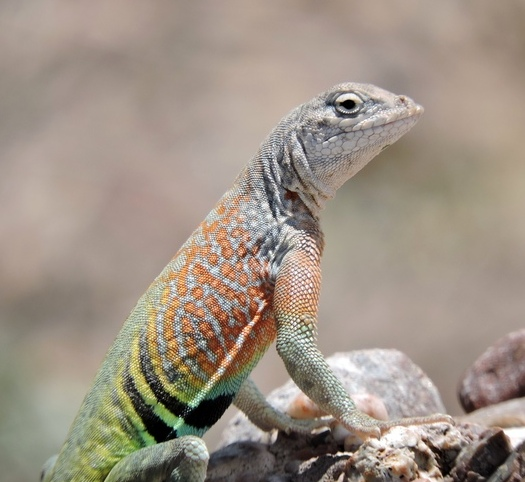
Chihuahuan greater earless lizard (Cophosaurus t. scitulus), male, (20 May 2015)

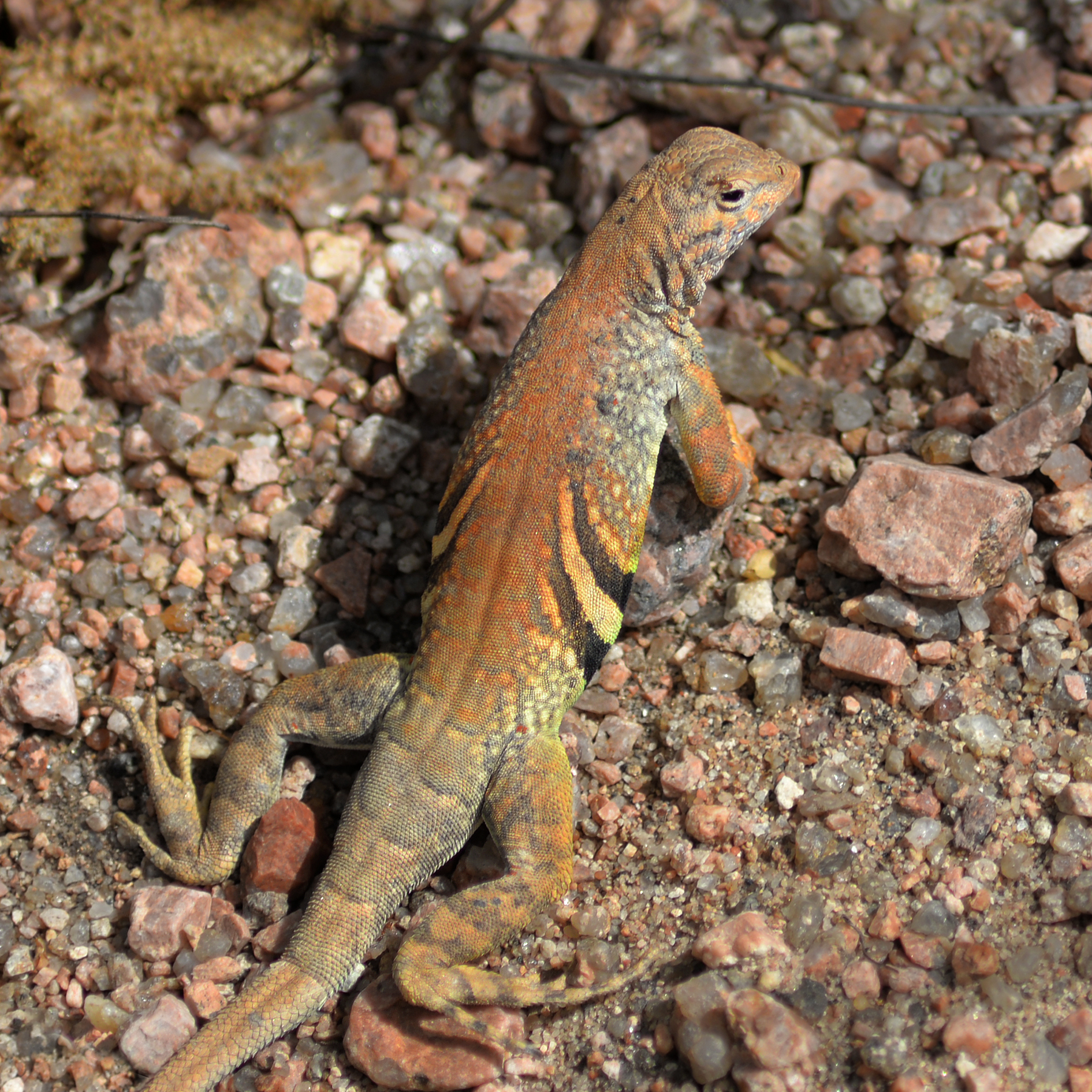
Texas greater earless lizard (Cophosaurus t. texanus), male, Llano County, Texas (26 April 2022)

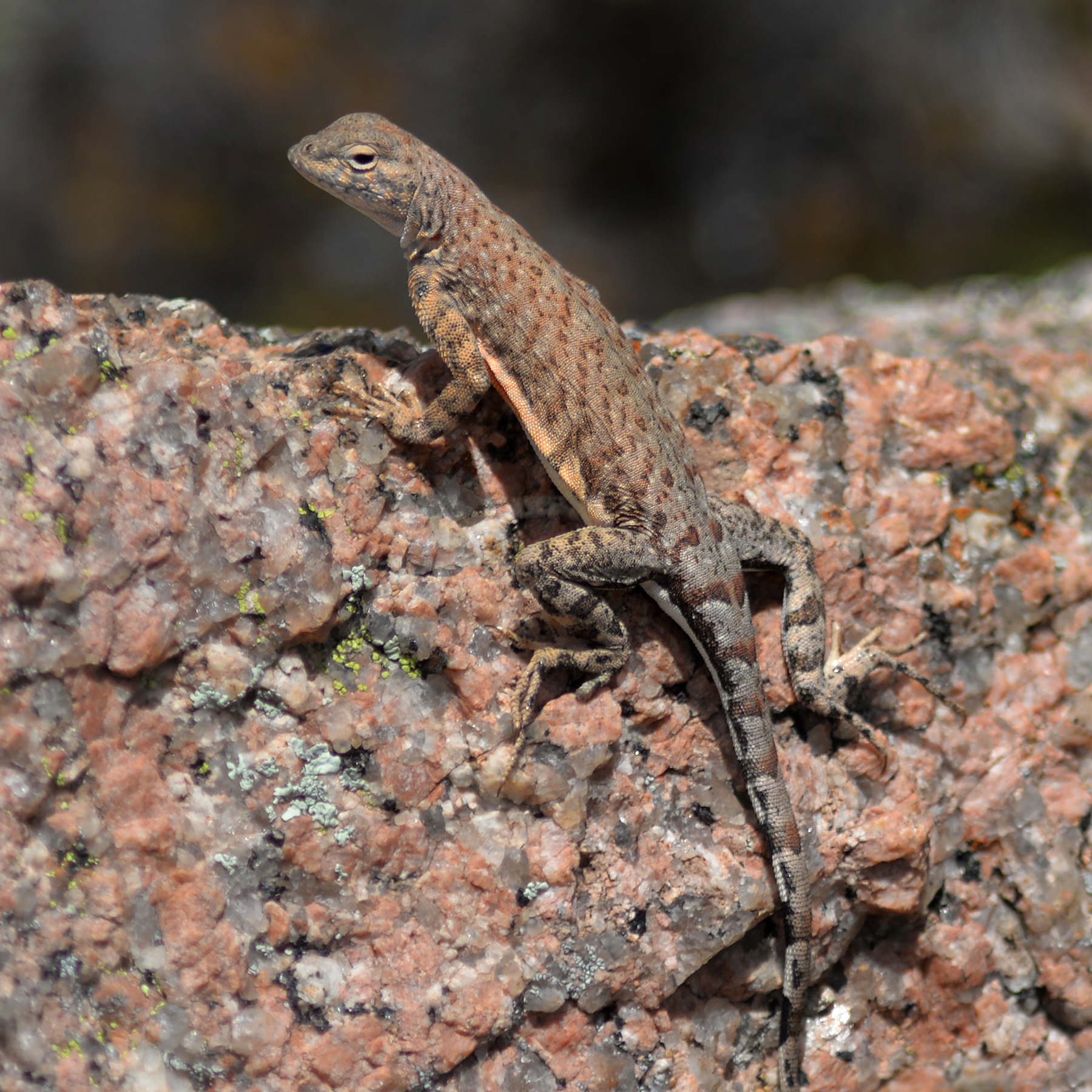
Texas greater earless lizard (Cophosaurus t. texanus), female, Llano County, Texas (26 April 2022)

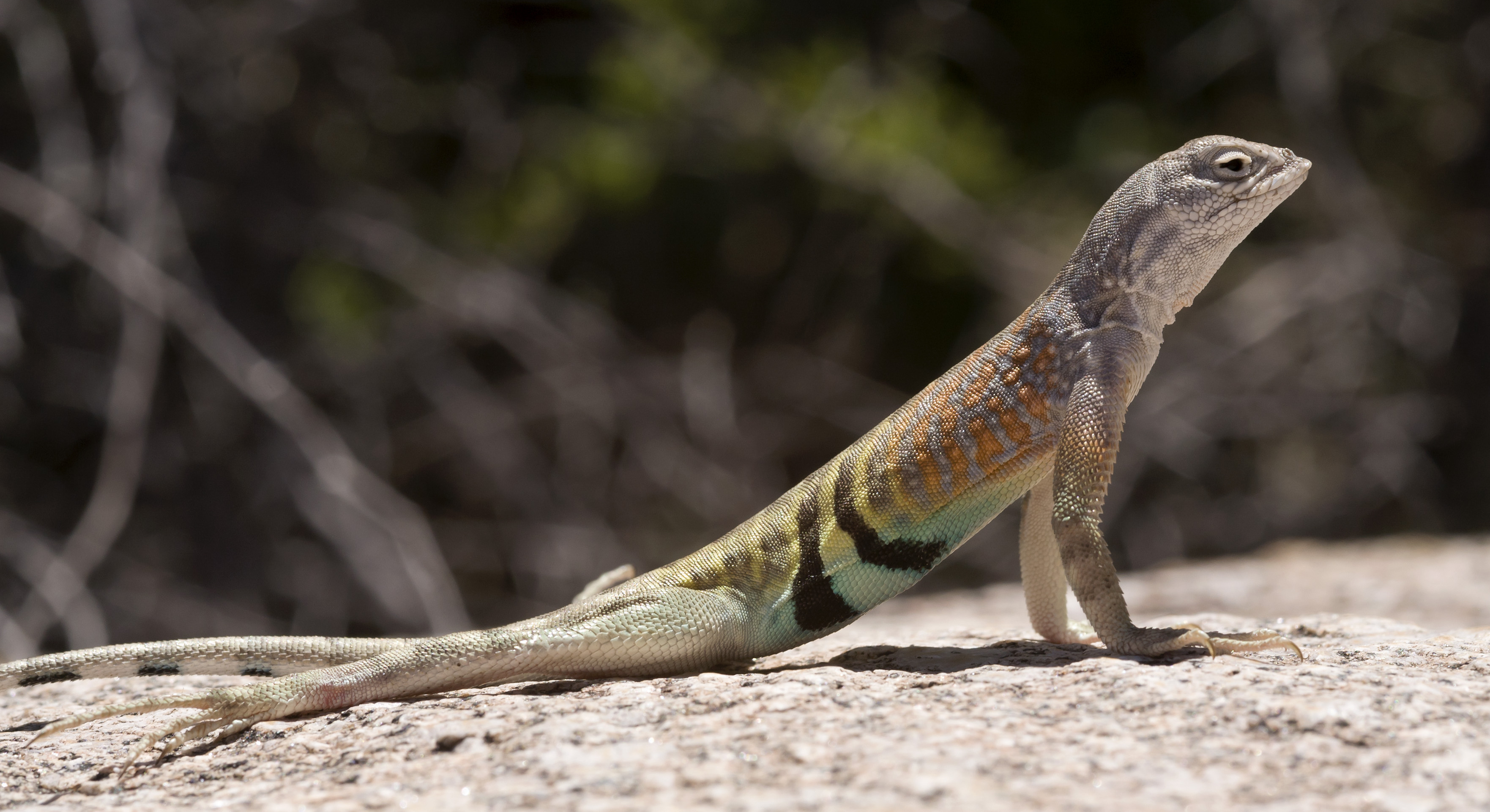
Chihuahuan greater earless lizard (Cophosaurus t. scitulus), male, Doña Ana County, New Mexico, (30 April 2015)

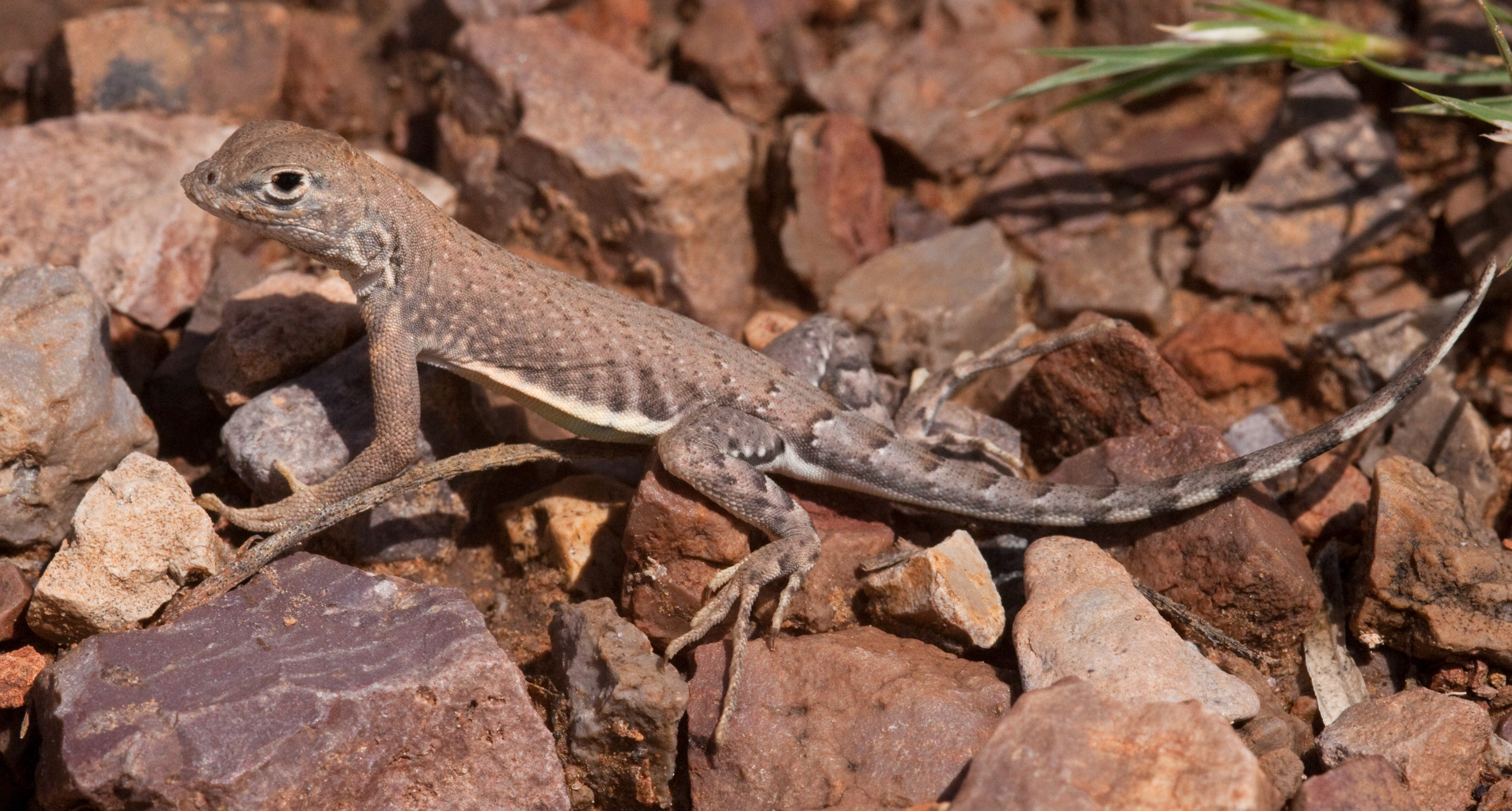
Chihuahuan greater earless lizard (Cophosaurus t. scitulus), female, Doña Ana County, New Mexico, (14 September 2013)
