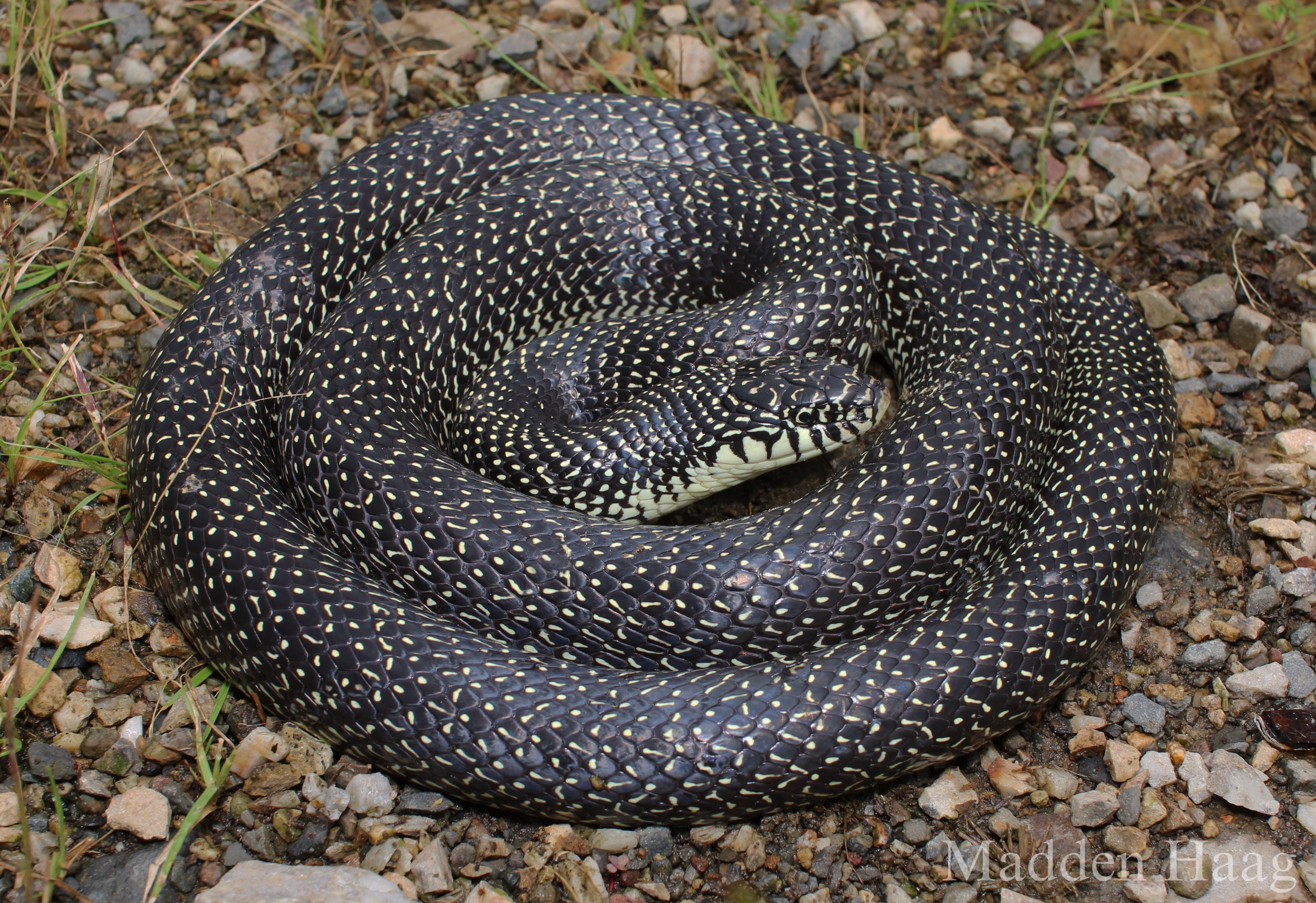

Conservation status
- Least Concern (IUCN 3.1)

Scientific classification
- Kingdom: Animalia
- Phylum: Chordata
- Class: Reptilia
- Order: Squamata
- Suborder: Serpentes
- Family: Colubridae
- Genus: Lampropeltis
- Species: L. holbrooki

Binomial name
- Lampropeltis holbrooki Stejneger, 1902
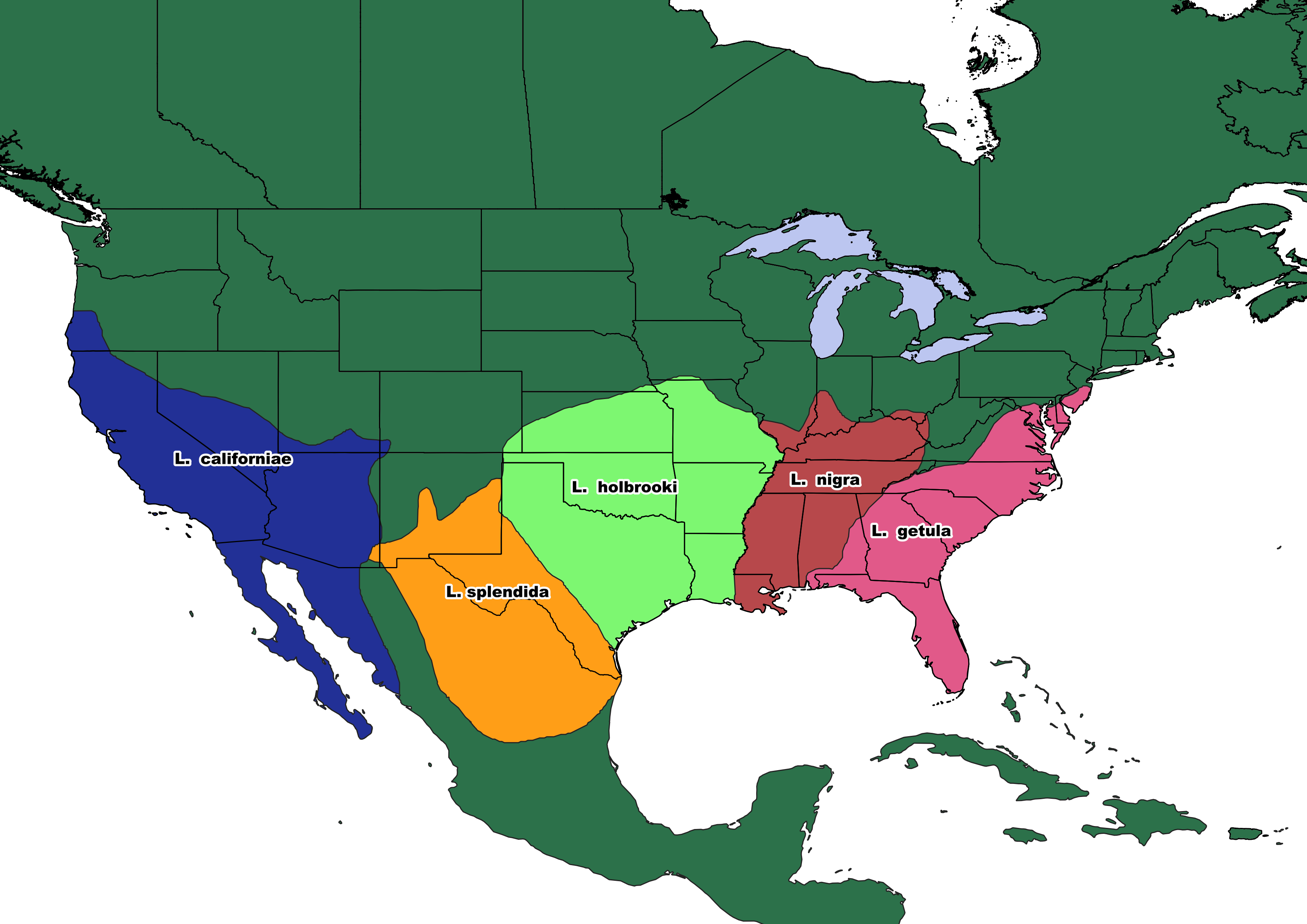

Synonyms
- Coronella sayi Holbrook, 1842; Lampropeltis holbrooki Stejneger, 1902; Lampropeltis getulus holbrooki — M. Allen, 1932; Lampropeltis getula holbrooki — Crother, 2000; Lampropeltis holbrooki — Pyron & Burbrink, 2009

= Speckled kingsnake =

Species of snake

The speckled kingsnake (Lampropeltis holbrooki) is a species of nonvenomous kingsnake in the family Colubridae. The species is endemic to the United States.

== Description ==
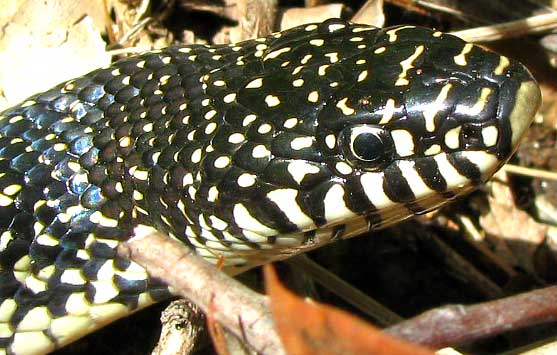
Adult in Mississippi

The speckled kingsnake usually grows up to 48 in (120 cm) in total length (including tail), but the record total length is 72 in (180 cm). The common name is derived from its pattern, which is black, with small yellow-white specks, one speck in the center of almost every dorsal scale. It is also known as the "salt-and-pepper snake".

== Geographic range ==
The speckled kingsnake is found in the central and southern United States from southern Iowa to the Gulf of Mexico. Its range overlaps that of the desert kingsnake, Lampropeltis splendida, and it is known to intergrade with that species.

== Habitat ==
The speckled kingsnake prefers wetter habitats than other kingsnakes, such as swamps and rivers, but it does commonly venture to dry areas such as woodlands and grassy fields.

== Diet ==
The diet of the speckled kingsnake consists of birds, rodents and other mammals, frogs, lizards, and other snakes. It kills by constriction.

== Behavior ==
When threatened, the speckled kingsnake shakes its tail like a rattlesnake to deter predators. It frequently expels musk and feces or bites when threatened. It is usually docile, often striking only one or two times after capture, and is frequently kept as a pet. It is commonly captive bred.

== Taxonomy and etymology ==
The speckled kingsnake was first described by American herpetologist John Edwards Holbrook in 1842. At that time, he called it Coronella sayi under the mistaken impression that it was the species previously described by Schlegel as Coluber sayi. In 1902, Stejneger pointed out that because Coluber sayi is a different snake, Pituophis catenifer sayi, the name sayi could not be applied to this snake. Therefore, he proposed the name Lampropeltis holbrooki, honoring Holbrook. It was for many years considered a subspecies of L. getula, but has been elevated to full species status as L. holbrooki.

== Combat ritual ==
A fight between two male speckled kingsnakes is very common to assert dominance. Once one of the males begins the fight, it is a race to who can hover or top the other, the one on top becoming the more dominant snake. This can include thrashing, biting, and intertwining. The more dominant snake is also usually more aggressive, which also leads to it besting the competition. The main reason for doing this is to assert one's territory, so the other male will not come close to their land.

== Diseases ==
Speckled kingsnakes have been known to contract worms or flagellates that have been deadly. When the nematode larvae were found in the snake feces, the snake proceeded to have symptoms such as diarrhea and muscle spasms. Snakes do not survive long after showing symptoms.

There have also been accounts of speckled kingsnakes having sporocysts in the feces. There is a small amount of research on this.

== Mating behaviors ==
There are a variety of motor patterns present during kingsnake intercourse. These include writhing, mounting, grasping (with mouth), and biting. There are also multiple phases of courtship, including tactile chase, tactile alignment, and intromission. Each phase is initiated by a share of motor patterns from both the male and female.
