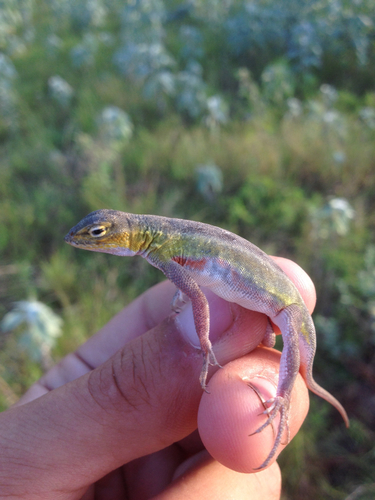

Scientific classification
- Kingdom: Animalia
- Phylum: Chordata
- Order: Squamata
- Suborder: Iguania
- Family: Phrynosomatidae
- Genus: Holbrookia
- Species: H. propinqua

Binomial name
- Holbrookia propinqua Baird & Girard, 1852

= Holbrookia propinqua =

Keeled earless lizard

Species of lizard

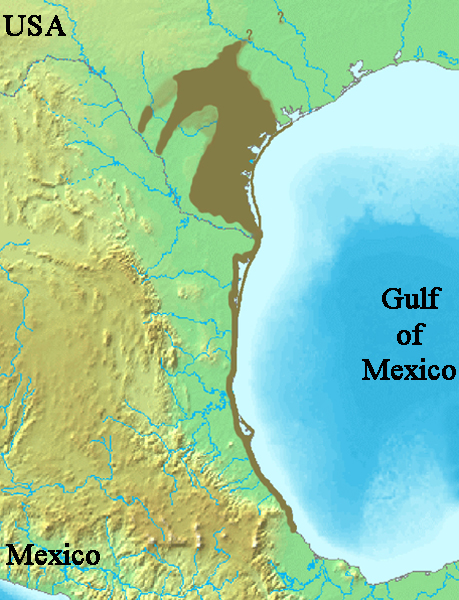
Geographic distribution of the keeled earless lizard (Holbrookia propinqua).

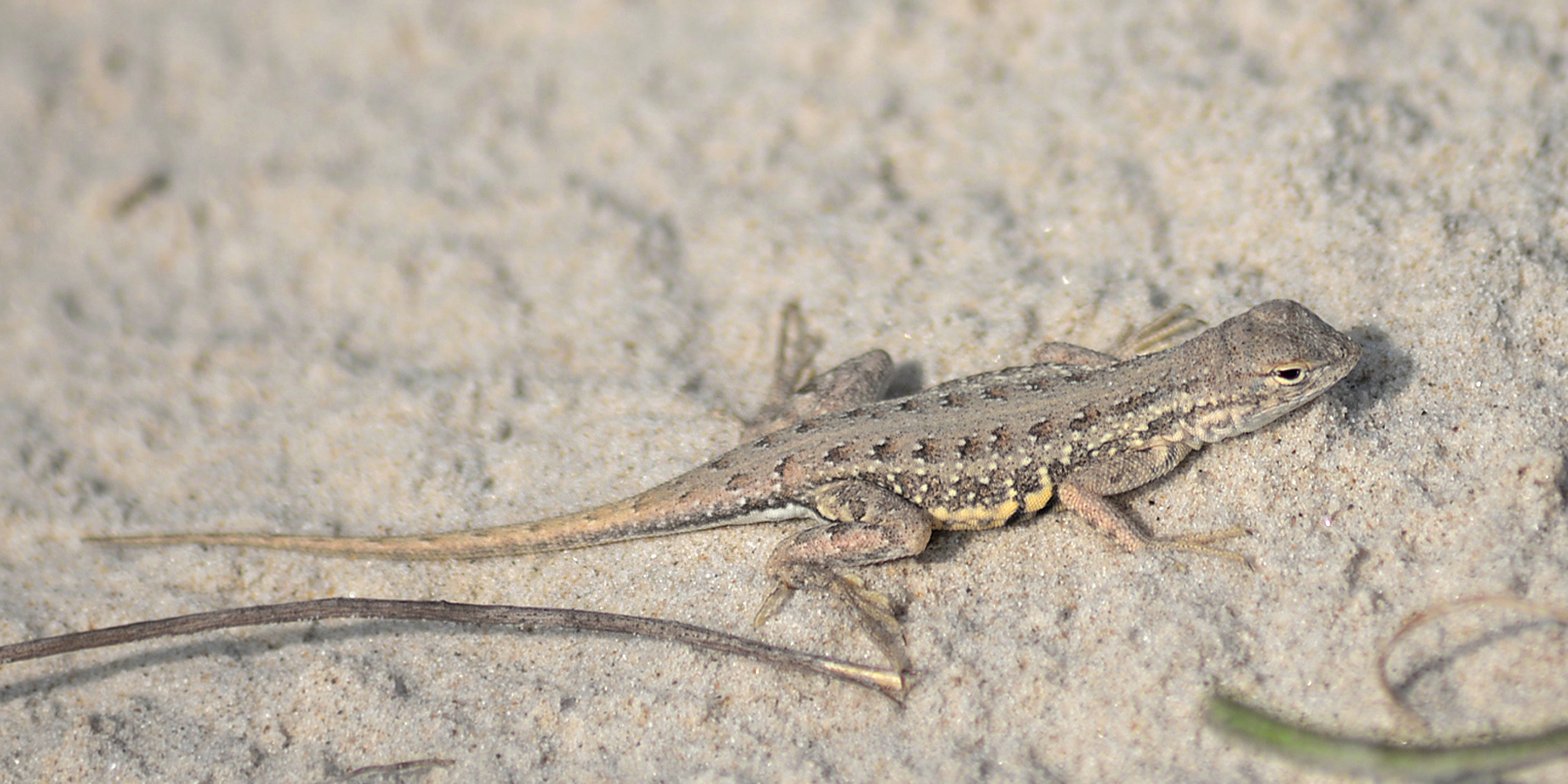
Keeled earless lizard (Holbrookia propinqua) male, Padre Island National Seashore, Kleberg Co. TX; 2 Nov 2022

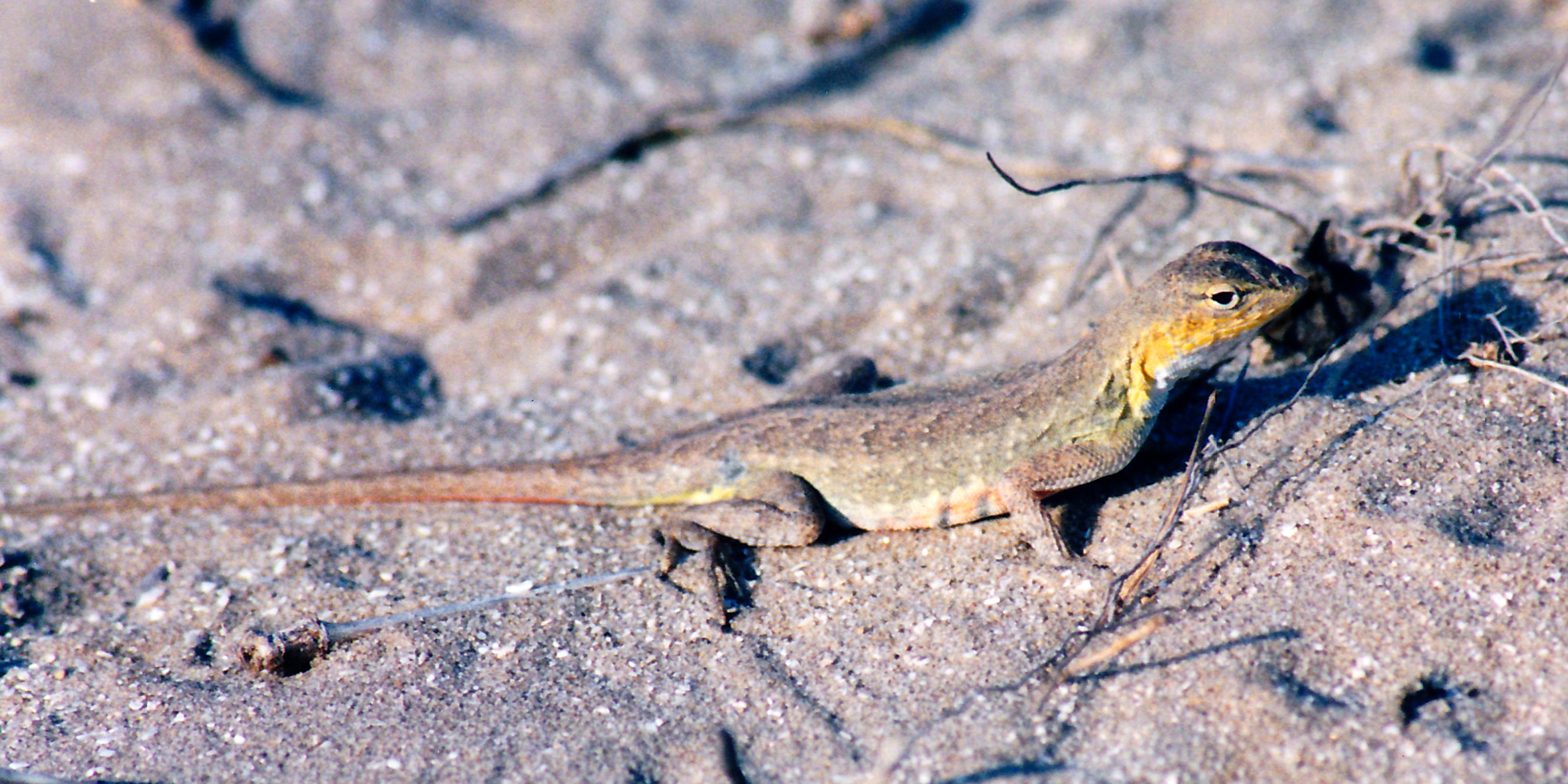
Keeled earless lizard (Holbrookia propinqua) female, municipality of Soto La Marina, Tamaulipas, Mexico (20 May 2002).

Holbrookia propinqua, commonly known as the keeled earless lizard, is a species of phrynosomatid lizard.

== Description ==
The dorsal scales are small, pointed, and keeled, as the common name implies. The lateral scales are similar but smaller. The ventral scales, which are flat and smooth, are 3-4 times larger than the dorsal scales. Adults may attain 62 mm (2 1/2 in) snout to vent length (SVL), 140 mm (5 1/2 in) total length.

== Geographic range and habitat ==
Holbrookia propinqua occurs in the Tamaulipan mezquital ecoregion where it is known from various vegetation zones in south Texas, including mixed oak forest, mesquite brush-lands, cleared fields, coastal prairie, and grasslands, although always where bands of Tertiary sand outcrops or sandy stream-side deposits are found. It is perhaps most common in the loose and shifting sands of beaches, barrier islands, and the Coastal Sand Plain of Southern Texas. It also ranges into northeast Mexico but it is highly restricted to the narrow zone of sand dunes of the coastal beaches, peninsulas, and barrier islands of Tamaulipas and southward to the vicinity of Veracruz, Veracruz.

== Subspecies ==
There are three recognized subspecies of Holbrookia propinqua:

- northern keeled earless lizard, Holbrookia propinqua propinqua Baird & Girard, 1852
- southern keeled earless lizard, Holbrookia propinqua piperata H.M. Smith & Burger, 1950
- Stone's keeled earless lizard, Holbrookia propinqua stonei Harper, 1932
