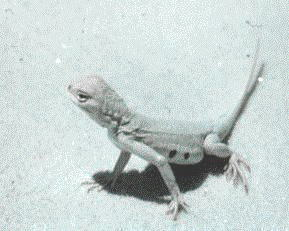

Scientific classification
- Kingdom: Animalia
- Phylum: Chordata
- Class: Reptilia
- Order: Squamata
- Suborder: Iguania
- Family: Phrynosomatidae
- Genus: Holbrookia; Girard, 1851

= Holbrookia =

Genus of lizards

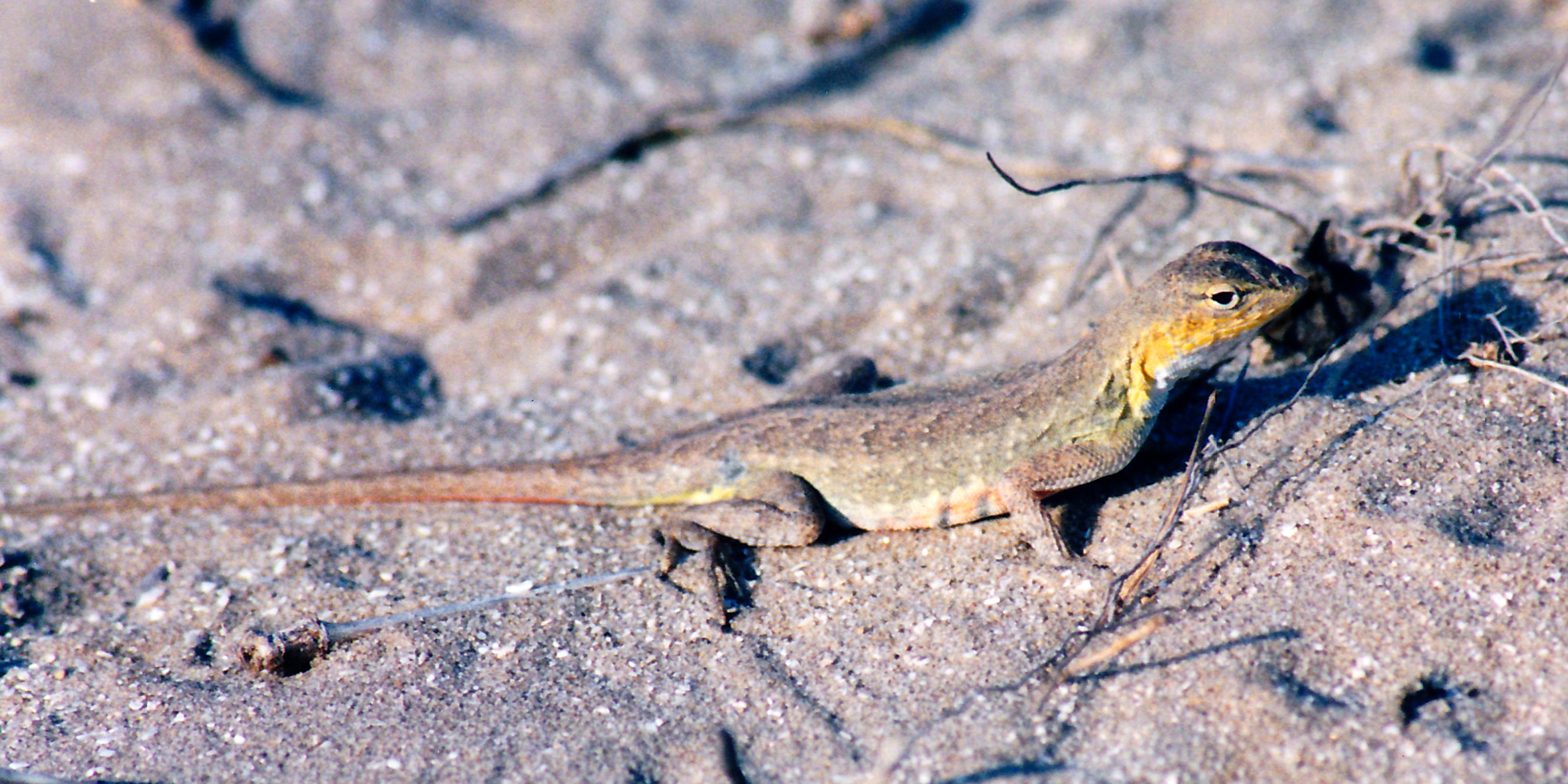
Keeled earless lizard (Holbrookia propinqua) female, municipality of Soto La Marina, Tamaulipas, Mexico (20 May 2002).

Holbrookia is a genus of earless lizards, known commonly as the lesser earless lizards, in the family Phrynosomatidae. The genus contains six recognized species, which are found throughout the Southwestern and Central United States and northern Mexico. They are characterized by having no external ear openings, presumably to prevent soil from entering their bodies when they are digging.

== Etymology ==
The generic name, Holbrookia, is in honor of American zoologist John Edwards Holbrook.

== Description ==
Lesser earless lizards grow to about 2.0–2.5 in (50–65 mm) snout-to-vent length (SVL), plus a tail of 3–4 in (75–100 mm). They are typically grey or tan in color, with black blotching. The males usually have blue patches on either side of their bellies, whereas the females do not. Females often change to have bright orange patches when gravid.

== Behavior ==
Holbrookia species are diurnal, basking lizards. They spend the vast majority of their time sunning on rocks, even in the heat of the day, until the surface temperature reaches around 104 °F (40 °C), when they will retreat to a rock crevice or burrow.

== Diet ==
Lesser earless lizards are insectivorous.

== Species ==
The genus Holbrookia contains six species which are recognized as being valid.

Image	Scientific name	Common Name	Distribution
	Holbrookia approximans Baird, 1859	speckled earless lizard	Southwestern United States and northern Mexico.
	Holbrookia elegans Bocourt, 1874	elegant earless lizard	United States and Mexico
	Holbrookia lacerata Cope, 1880	northern spot-tailed earless lizard	Mexico, in the states of Coahuila, Nuevo León, and Tamaulipas, and to the United States, in south-central Texas.
	Holbrookia maculata Girard, 1851	lesser earless lizard	United States and northern Mexico
	Holbrookia propinqua Baird & Girard, 1852	keeled earless lizard	Southern Texas and northeast Mexico
	Holbrookia subcaudalis Axtell, 1956	southern spot-tailed earless lizard	Mexico and the United States in southern Texas.

== Geographic range ==
Earless lizards (genera Cophosaurus and Holbrookia) are found in the Southwestern and Central United States, in Texas, Arizona, New Mexico, Utah, Colorado, Kansas, Oklahoma, and as far north as Nebraska, South Dakota, and Wyoming. They are also found in Mexico, in the states of Sonora, Chihuahua, Coahuila, Sinaloa, Durango, Zacatecas, San Luis Potosí, Nuevo León, Tamaulipas, and Veracruz.

== See also ==
- Genus Cophosaurus, the greater earless lizard
