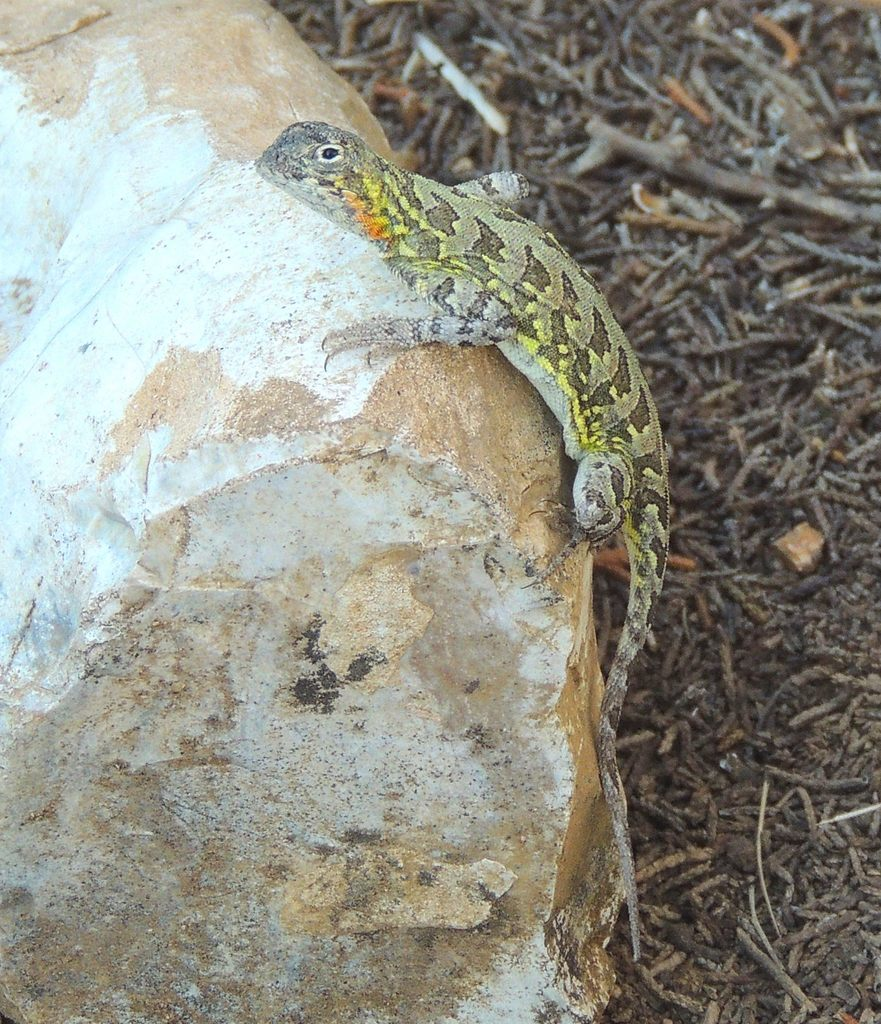

Conservation status
- Near Threatened (IUCN 3.1)

Scientific classification
- Domain: Eukaryota
- Kingdom: Animalia
- Phylum: Chordata
- Class: Reptilia
- Order: Squamata
- Suborder: Iguania
- Family: Phrynosomatidae
- Genus: Holbrookia
- Species: H. lacerata

Binomial name
- Holbrookia lacerata Cope, 1880

Synonyms
- Holbrookia maculata lacerata — H.M. Smith & Taylor, 1950.

= Holbrookia lacerata =

Species of lizard

Holbrookia lacerata, commonly known as the spot-tailed earless lizard, is a species of phrynosomatid lizard.

== Geographic range ==
It is native to Mexico, in the states of Coahuila, Nuevo León and Tamaulipas, and to the United States, in south-central Texas.

== Taxonomy ==
Originally described as a species, it was once reclassified as a subspecies of the lesser earless lizard, Holbrookia maculata, but has since been again elevated to full species status.
