= Holbrookia maculata =

Lesser earless lizard

Conservation status
- Least Concern (IUCN 3.1)

Scientific classification
- Kingdom: Animalia
- Phylum: Chordata
- Order: Squamata
- Suborder: Iguania
- Family: Phrynosomatidae
- Genus: Holbrookia
- Species: H. maculata

Binomial name
- Holbrookia maculata Girard, 1851

Species of lizard

Holbrookia maculata, commonly known as the lesser earless lizard, is a species of lizard in the family Phrynosomatidae. The species is native to the southwestern and central United States and northern Mexico. There are eight recognized subspecies.

== Taxonomy ==
=== Subspecies ===
The following eight subspecies of Holbrookia maculata are recognized as being valid, including the nominotypical subspecies.

- H. m. bunkeri H.M. Smith, 1935 – Bunker's earless lizard
- H. m. campi Schmidt, 1921
- H. m. dickersonae Schmidt, 1921 – Dickerson's earless lizard
- H. m. flavilenta Cope, 1883
- H. m. maculata Girard, 1851 – northern earless lizard
- H. m. perspicua Axtell, 1956 – eastern earless lizard, prairie eastern lizard
- H. m. pulchra K.P. Schmidt, 1921 – Huachuca earless lizard
- H. m. ruthveni H.M. Smith, 1943 – bleached earless lizard (an ecotonal subspecies from New Mexico's White Sands)

=== Subspecies etymology ===
The subspecific name, bunkeri, is in honor of American zoologist Charles Dean Bunker (1870–1948).

The subspecific name, campi, is in honor of American paleontologist Charles Lewis Camp.

The subspecific name, dickersonae, is in honor of American herpetologist Mary Cynthia Dickerson.

The subspecific name, ruthveni, is in honor of American herpetologist Alexander Grant Ruthven.

== Description ==
H. maculata is a small species of lizard. Adults have a total length (including tail) of 4–5 in (10–13 cm). The dorsal scales are granular and smooth. There are no external ear openings. There are two folds across the throat. The throat of the female is orange during the breeding season. The underside of the tail has no dark spots.

== Distribution and habitat ==
H. maculata is found in the U.S. states of Arizona, Colorado, Kansas, Oklahoma, Nebraska, New Mexico, South Dakota, Texas, Utah, and Wyoming, as well as in the Mexican states of Chihuahua, Coahuila, Durango, Guanajuato, Jalisco, Nuevo León, San Luis Potosí, Sinaloa, Sonora, and Zacatecas.

The preferred natural habitats of H. maculata are shrubland, grassland, and desert.

== Behaviour and ecology ==
H. maculata is oviparous. It preys upon insects and spiders.
