= Earless lizard =

Group of lizards

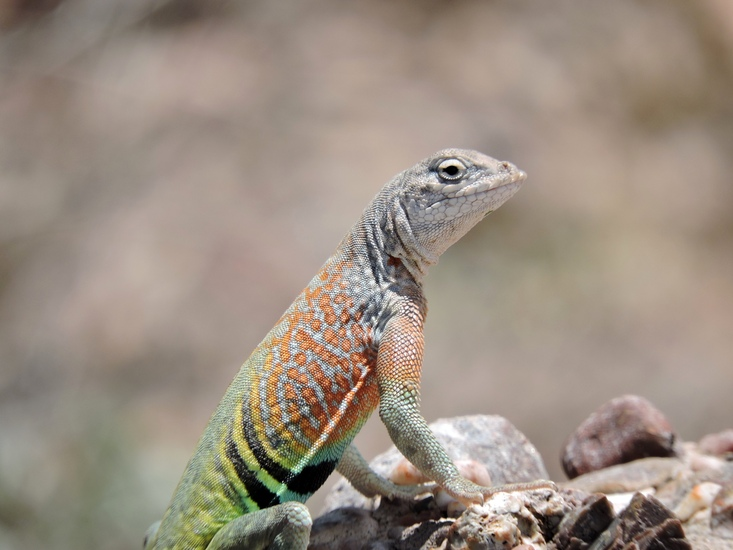
Earless lizard

Earless lizards are two genera of small lizards in the family Phrynosomatidae native to the semiarid and grassland habitats of the Southwestern United States and Mexico. The genus Cophosaurus and the genus Holbrookia are both characterized by having no external ear openings, presumably to prevent sand from entering their bodies as they dig.

== Distinctive features ==
Earless lizards typically vary from 3 to 7 inches (76 to 178 mm) long. Males tend to be larger than females. The male has two heavy black strips ahead of its hind legs (pictured). The female differs in that she has a black stripe behind each thigh. A pink throat and flanks indicate pregnancy. Earless lizards have two throat folds, large eyes, and 27 or fewer femoral pores. They are also described as having shorter fore legs compared to their hind legs and also rather long toes. Although they are called earless lizards, they are still completely capable of hearing, but their ears do not have an external opening. This feature is useful when they burrow underground without getting soil in their ears.

== Behavior ==
Earless lizards are most active during daylight; they hibernate during the winter and fall. When approached by a predator, their defense mechanism is raising and wagging their tails. To claim their territory, a combination of lateral body compression, head bobbing, and push-ups is done. Earless lizards are capable of homeostasis to a certain extent. As a feedback to temperature change, they acquire heat by conduction, convection, and radiation. In cooler temperatures, they raise their body temperature by turning their bodies broadside to the sun to absorb heat (infrared radiation). They can also align their bodies to the sun to reduced absorption to reduce body temperature. In warmer temperatures, they decreases their body temperature by conduction, such as climbing a tree to avoid elevated temperature from the ground.

== Diet ==
The diet of earless lizards consists of arthropods, such as butterflies, moths, beetles, grasshoppers, insects, and spiders.

== Defense mechanism ==
The earless lizard has a peculiar defense mechanism coupled to its cold-blooded metabolism. It has a small opening on the top of its head called a "blood sinus", which helps it gain heat quickly during the daytime. However, the blood can also be channeled to the eyes of the lizard when a predator approaches, efficiently spraying the blood onto the predator, giving it enough time to escape.

== Reproduction ==
Mating takes place in spring. Earless lizards lay their eggs between March and August, and about fifty days are needed for them to hatch. They tend to lay one to three clutches of eggs. Clutch sizes range from one to 10 eggs. When hatched, the hatchlings are about 2 in (5 cm) long.

== Threats ==
No major existential threat has been identified in the US or Mexico, but habitat loss and degradation would result in a decline of this species.

== Geographic range ==
Earless lizards are found from the Southwestern and Central United States, in Texas, Arizona, New Mexico, Utah, Colorado, Kansas, Oklahoma, and as far north as Nebraska, South Dakota, and Wyoming. They are also found in Mexico, in the states of Sonora, Chihuahua, Coahuila, Sinaloa, Durango, Zacatecas, San Luis Potosí, Nuevo León, Tamaulipas, and Veracruz.

== Gallery ==
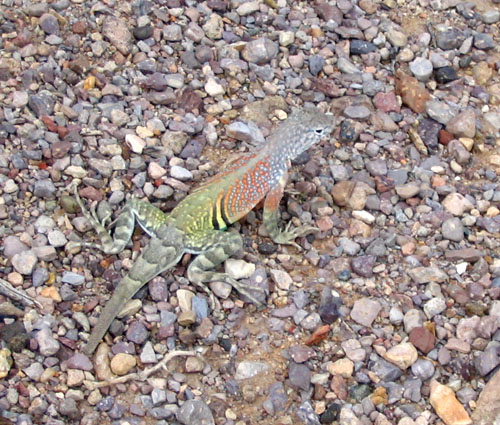
Greater earless lizard

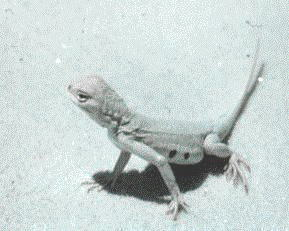
Earless lizard in the White Sands National Monument

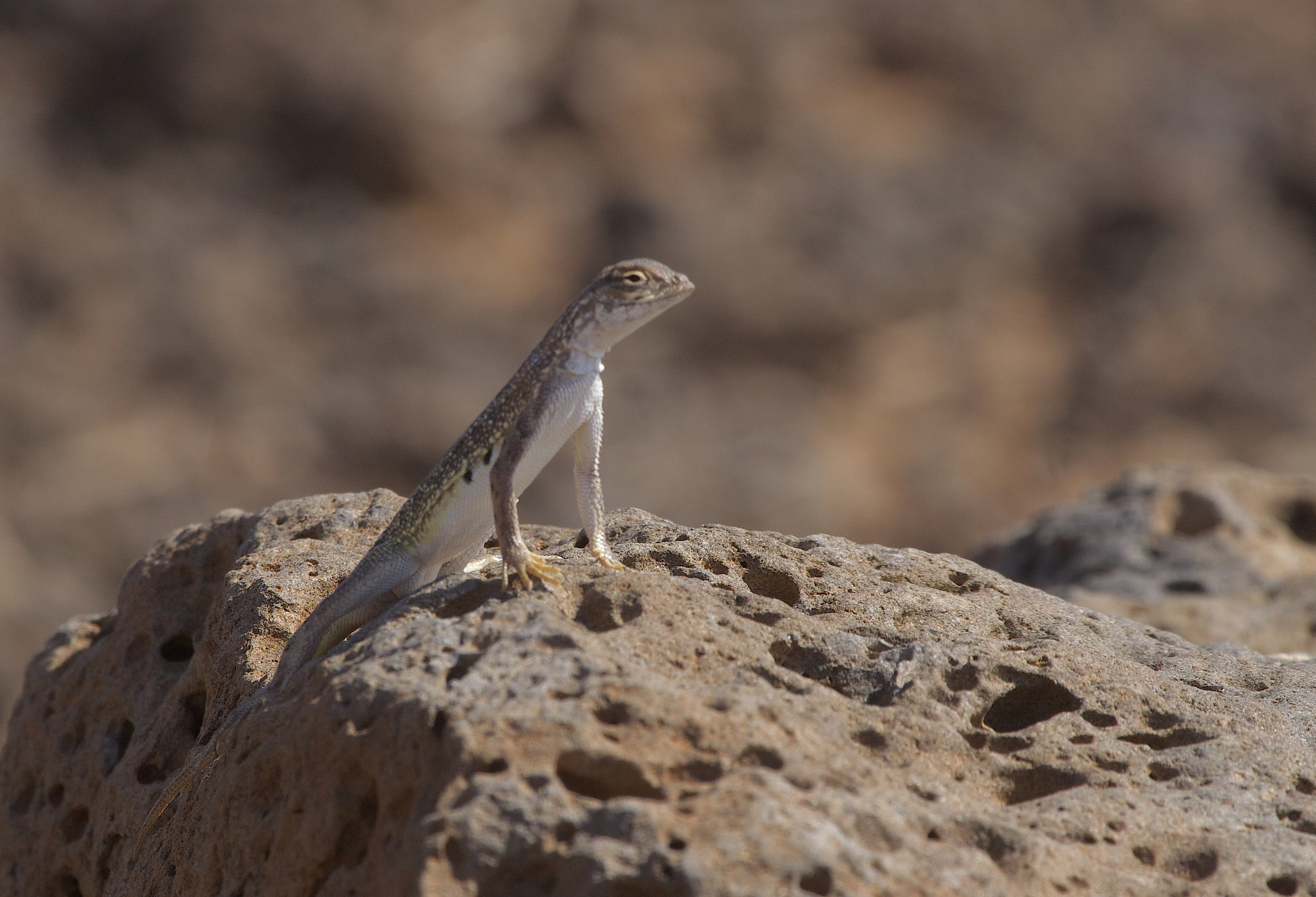
Lesser earless lizard

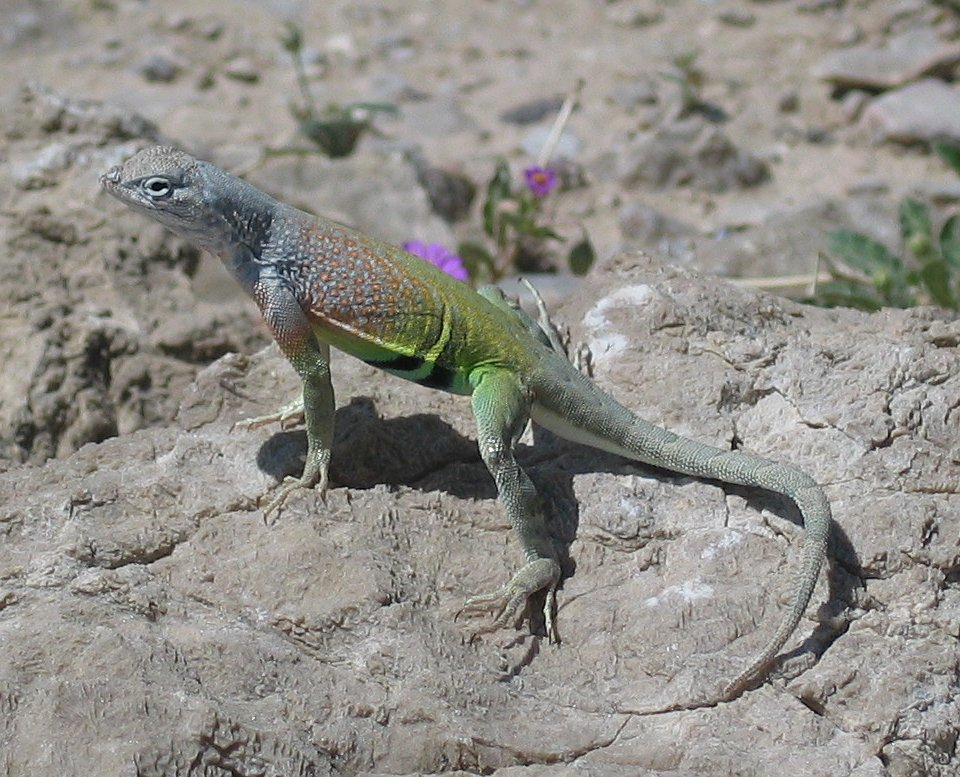
Greater earless lizard
