= Clementa C. Pinckney =

American politician and pastor (1973–2015)

The Reverend Clementa C. Pinckney

Member of the South Carolina Senate from the 45th district
- In office January 2001 – June 17, 2015
- Preceded by: McKinley Washington Jr.
- Succeeded by: Margie Bright Matthews

Member of the South Carolina House of Representatives from the 122nd district
- In office January 1997 – January 2001
- Preceded by: Juanita Mitchell White
- Succeeded by: Thayer Rivers

Personal details
- Born: Clementa Carlos Pinckney; July 30, 1973 Beaufort, South Carolina, U.S.
- Died: June 17, 2015 (aged 41) Charleston, South Carolina, U.S.
- Cause of death: Assassination (gunshot wounds)
- Resting place: Saint James Cemetery; Marion, South Carolina, U.S.
- Party: Democratic
- Spouse: Jennifer Benjamin (m. 1999)
- Children: 2
- Education: Allen University (BA); University of South Carolina (MPA); Lutheran Theological Southern Seminary (M.Div.); Wesley Theological Seminary

Religious life
- Religion: Christian
- Church: Emanuel African Methodist Episcopal Church

Senior posting
- Post: Senior pastor (2010–2015)

Clementa Carlos Pinckney (clemen-TAY; July 30, 1973 – June 17, 2015) was an American politician and pastor who served as a Democratic member of the South Carolina Senate, representing the 45th District from 2000 until his murder in 2015. He was previously a member of the South Carolina House of Representatives from 1997 through 2000.

Pinckney was born to a large family with six siblings in Beaufort, South Carolina. He began preaching at church at age thirteen and was appointed pastor at age eighteen. He graduated from several universities, including Allen University, and the University of South Carolina. He was also educated at the Lutheran Theological Southern Seminary, and the Wesley Theological Seminary.

In 1996, Pinckney became the youngest African-American man elected to the South Carolina General Assembly at the age of twenty-three. While serving in the Senate, Pinckney was an advocate for civil rights. He prominently supported body cameras after the death of Walter Scott, and gained controversy after holding a rally about his death. He also unsuccessfully proposed a bill that would display the Pan-African flag at the South Carolina State House.

Pinckney was also a senior pastor at Mother Emanuel A.M.E. in Charleston. In 2015, Pinckney was murdered by white supremacist Dylann Roof in a racially motivated terrorist mass shooting along with numerous other innocent victims at an evening Bible study at his church. President Barack Obama delivered the eulogy and sang "Amazing Grace" at Pinckney's funeral nine days later.

== Early life and education ==
Clementa Carlos Pinckney was born on July 30, 1973, in Beaufort, South Carolina. He was nicknamed "Clem". His mother, Theopia Stevenson Aikens (née Brooms; 1945–2005), was an early childhood development educator, and his father, John Pinckney, was an auto mechanic. Pinckney had at least six brothers and sisters. He began preaching at his church at age 13 and, by age 18, he was appointed pastor.

Pinckney's maternal family, the Stevensons, has many generations of pastors in the African Methodist Episcopal Church (AMEC). His maternal great-grandfather, Reverend Lorenzo Stevenson, brought a lawsuit against the state's Democratic Party to end unintegrated primaries. During the Civil Rights Movement, Pinckney's maternal uncle, Reverend Levern Stevenson, worked with the National Association for the Advancement of Colored People (NAACP) to desegregate school buses, and sued South Carolina Governor John C. West to create single-member districts to help elect more blacks into the South Carolina General Assembly.

Pinckney's paternal family are based in the Beaufort, South Carolina, area and may be descendants of slaves owned by Charles Cotesworth Pinckney, who was instrumental in framing the United States Constitution and was part of the Middleton-Rutledge-Pinckney family, a family that included many politicians. The Pinckney Island National Wildlife Refuge is where the plantation was located.

Pinckney went to Jasper County High School, where he was elected class president for two years. He graduated with a Bachelor of Arts degree from Allen University in 1995 and went on to obtain a Master of Public Administration degree from the University of South Carolina in 1999. He then received a Master of Divinity degree from Lutheran Theological Southern Seminary. Pinckney was a student at Wesley Theological Seminary pursuing a Doctor of Ministry (D.Min.) degree at the time of his death.

== Career ==
=== Religious career ===
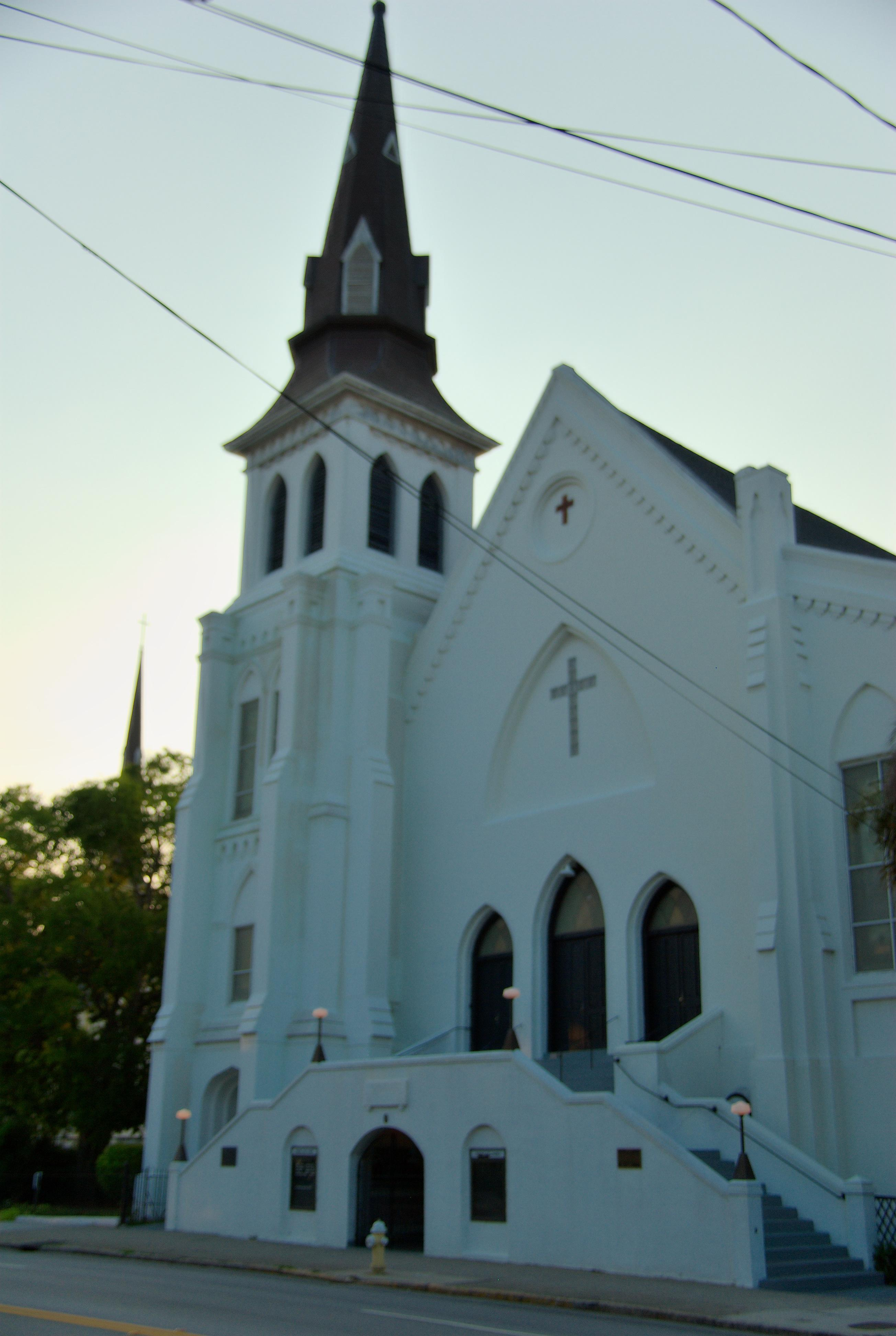
Mother Emanuel AME in Charleston, South Carolina

Pinckney preached in Beaufort, Charleston, and Columbia. He became pastor of Emanuel A.M.E. Church in Charleston, South Carolina, in 2010. As part of his work, Pinckney oversaw 17 churches in the area.

In his leadership position at Mother Emanuel, Pinckney followed in the footsteps of Reverend Richard H. Cain and other AME church leaders, continuing a tradition of religious leaders serving in political positions with a focus on political activism in service to his community. Pinckney said he felt a deep connection between serving his community in politics in complement to his ministry work. Historian Henry Louis Gates Jr. featured Pinckney in interviews for his award-winning PBS series The African Americans: Many Rivers to Cross.

Pinckney was among several South Carolina pastors to hold rallies after the shooting of Walter Scott in 2015, attracting some local controversy.

=== Legislative career ===
Pinckney was first elected to the South Carolina General Assembly in 1996 at the age of 23, becoming the youngest African American elected as a South Carolina state legislator. He served in the South Carolina House of Representatives until being elected to the South Carolina Senate in 2000. Pinckney was a Democrat and was a member of the South Carolina Legislative Black Caucus. Pinckney represented Allendale, Beaufort, Charleston, Colleton, Hampton, and Jasper Counties in South Carolina. At the time of his death, he was on the following Committees: Banking and Insurance, Corrections and Penology, Education, Finance, and Medical Affairs.

==== Body cameras ====
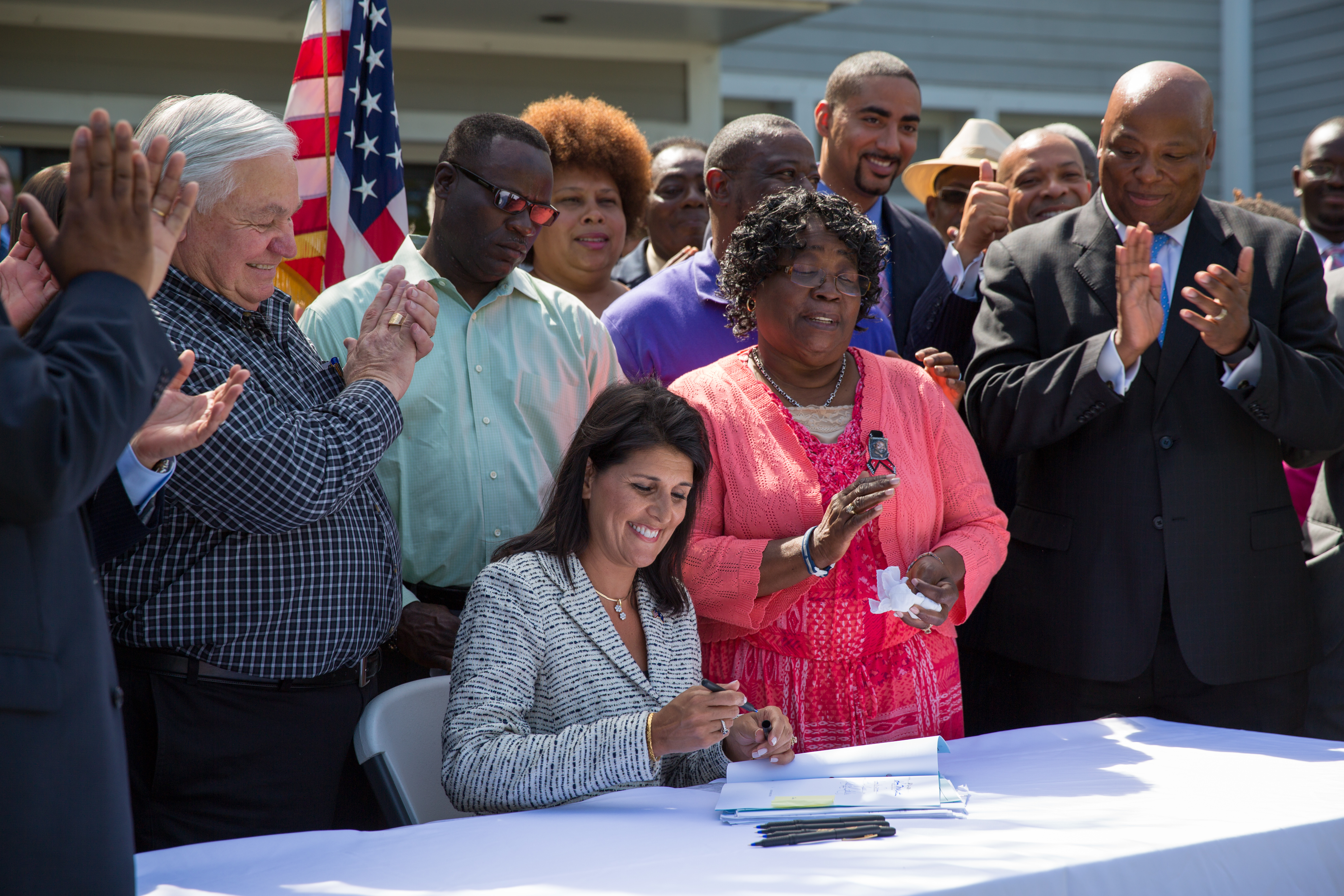
Governor Nikki Haley signs legislation requiring South Carolina police officers to wear body cameras.

As a state senator, Pinckney pushed for laws to require police and other law enforcement officials to wear body cameras after Walter Scott, an unarmed black man, was shot eight times in the back by a police officer in North Charleston. In April 2015, Pinckney gave an impassioned speech on the topic at the South Carolina Senate, citing the fact that national news had come to North Charleston because of the video tape of the incident.

==== Pan-African flag ====
In 2001, Pinckney, along with senator Maggie Glover, proposed a bill for the black nationalist Pan-African flag to be displayed at the South Carolina State House. The bill planned for the South Carolina Senate Judiciary Committee to hang up the flag, however, faced sharp criticism for its association with black supremacist groups as well as the willingness of the flag's creator to work with the KKK.

== Death and funeral ==
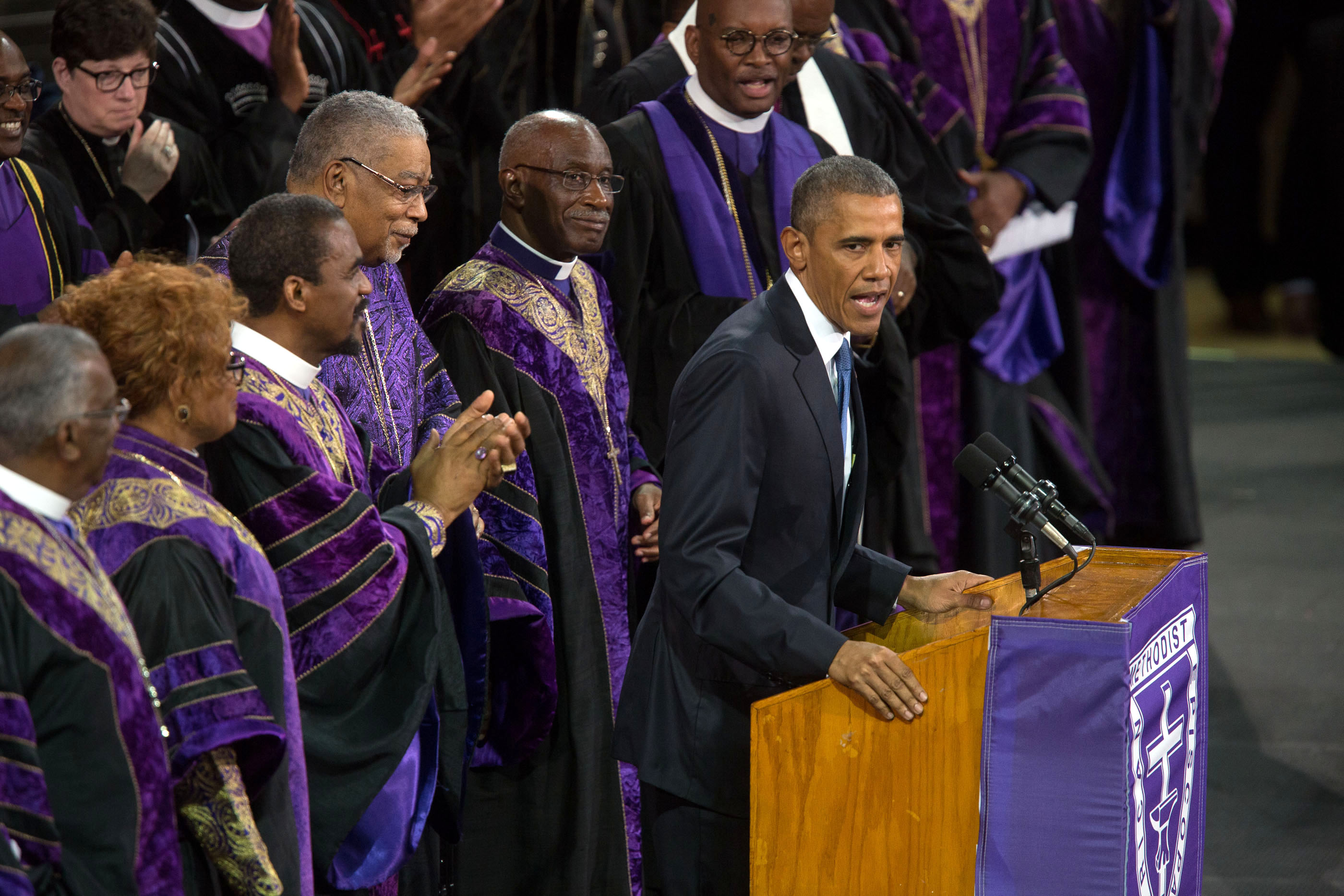
Barack Obama delivers the eulogy at the funeral of Reverend Clementa Pinckney 2015-06-26

On the night of June 17, 2015, Pinckney was killed in the Charleston church shooting. He spent the earlier part of that day campaigning with Democratic presidential candidate Hillary Clinton in Charleston. That evening, he led a Bible study and prayer session at Emanuel African Methodist Episcopal Church, where he was senior pastor. The shooter, Dylann Roof, specifically asked for Pinckney and later opened fire on the congregation, killing Pinckney and eight others. The FBI investigated the mass shooting as a hate crime, while NBC 5's Eric King considered the attack a racially motivated act of terrorism, criticizing law enforcement and the media for not labeling it as such.

On June 24, 2015, there was a public viewing of Pinckney's casket in the rotunda lobby of the State Capitol Senate Chamber where Pinckney served in the South Carolina legislature, and where his body lay in state. Public viewings were held at St. John AME Church in Ridgeland, South Carolina, and Mother Emanuel in Charleston, South Carolina. A funeral was held on June 26, 2015, at the College of Charleston in TD Arena, which was filled up to maximum capacity, necessitating a viewing center with a video feed at the Charleston Museum. President Barack Obama, Michelle Obama, Vice President Joe Biden, Jill Biden, and presidential candidate Hillary Clinton, among many other politicians and public figures, attended the funeral, with Obama giving the eulogy. During the eulogy, Obama sang the opening stanza of "Amazing Grace".

=== Aftermath ===
On June 24, 2015, Pinckney would lie in state at the South Carolina State House. Pinckney would be the first African American to achieve this honor.

As a result of the shooting, in July 2015, the South Carolina Legislature enacted legislation to take down the Confederate flag flying in front of the South Carolina State House and move it to the Confederate Relic Room and Military Museum. The shooter had previously posed in front of and posted images of a similar flag on his website. Pinckney's widow attended the session during the final vote to thank her husband's colleagues for their support. In June 2015, the family of Pinckney established the Clementa C. Pinckney Foundation to support poor families in the South Carolina Lowcountry region. Jennifer Pinckney, his wife, Senator Gerald Malloy, who served with Pinckney in the Senate, and Reverend Kylon Jerome Middleton, Ph.D., Pinckney's best friend, established the foundation in Pinckney's honor to support educational, health, pastoral training, and charitable causes. In July 2015, Mother Emanuel, in response to anonymous donations of more than $3 million, established The Reverend Pinckney Scholarship Fund, which was created to support education scholarship for church members, victims of the shooting and their extended families. The initial fund was overseen by Charleston Mayor Joseph P. Riley Jr, historian and educator Henry Louis Gates Jr and investment banker William M. Lewis Jr.

In August 2015, the Charleston County School District decided to name new Charleston County middle school Simmons-Pinckney Middle School, in honor of both Pinckney and blacksmith Philip Simmons.

In May 2016, a portrait by South Carolina artist Larry Francis Lebby was unveiled in a ceremony in the South Carolina Senate chambers.

On August 8, 2019, the Churchwide Assembly of the Evangelical Lutheran Church in America adopted a resolution to recognize Clementa C. Pinckney and the Emanuel 9 as martyrs on their liturgical calendar and declare June 17 as "a day of repentance in the ELCA for the martyrdom of the Emanuel 9." At the time of the shooting, Dylann Roof was a member of an ELCA congregation. The Rev. Clementa Pinckney was a graduate of Lutheran Theological Southern Seminary, a seminary of the ELCA.

In 2020, Allen University announced that their renovation of the Good Samaritan Waverly Hospital would include a memorial that will prominently feature the names of Pinckney and the other eight individuals slain at Emanual African Methodist Episcopal Church.

== Personal life ==
In 1999, Pinckney married Jennifer Pinckney (née Benjamin) in Augusta, Georgia. They met while he was at Allen University and she was at the University of South Carolina. The couple lived in Ridgeland, South Carolina, with their two daughters, Eliana Yvette Pinckney and Malana Elise Pinckney. Pinckney was a member of Alpha Phi Alpha fraternity. Pinckney was named in honor of the baseball player Roberto Clemente of the Pittsburgh Pirates due to his mother's love of baseball. During his eulogy, multiple friends and family pronounced his first name as "Clemen-tay". Pinckney was the cousin of the businessman and conservative commentator Armstrong Williams.

Pinckney was buried in Marion, South Carolina, at the St. James AME Cemetery.

== See also ==
- List of assassinated American politicians
