= Bill Hager =

Bill Hager may refer to:

- Bill Hager (footballer) (1925–2011), Australian footballer
- Bill Hager (Florida politician) (1947–2021), Florida state representative
- Bill Hager (South Carolina politician) (born 1960), South Carolina state representative
