= 2010s in the United States =

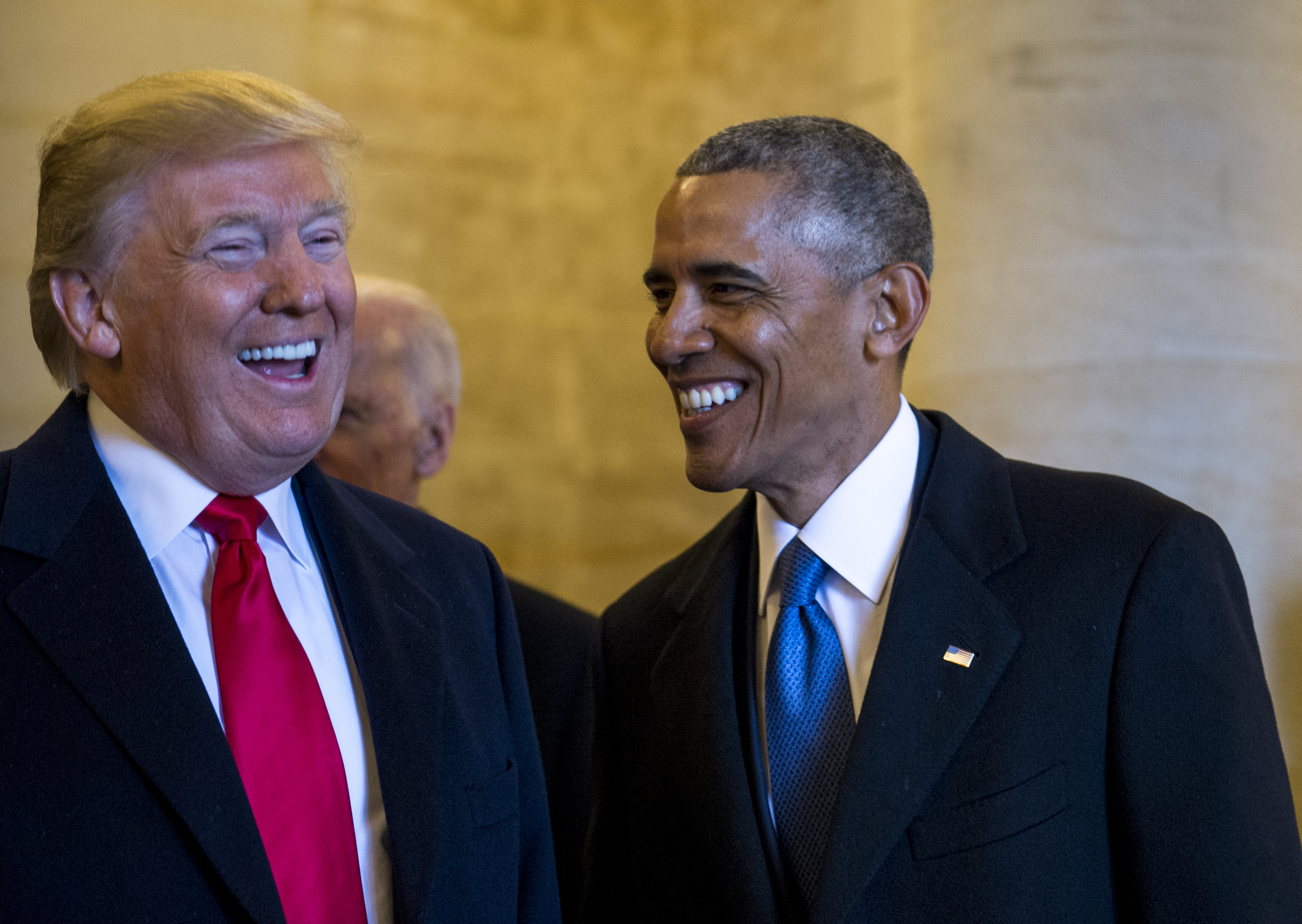
President Barack Obama and President-elect Donald Trump in 2017

Events from the decade 2010s in the United States.

== Overview ==
During this time period the United States experienced a wave of unprecedented political polarization and ongoing political debates such as climate change, voting rights, gun control, police misconduct, and immigration. The ongoing 2008 financial crisis dominated the early Obama presidency (2009–2017). Democrats held the majority in both houses of Congress and control of the presidency which enabled Obama to pass numerous landmark legislative pieces such as the Lily Ledbetter Fair Pay Act, Dodd-Frank, the Affordable Care Act (Obamacare), and the Don't Ask Don't Tell Repeal Act of 2011. Economic inequality and lack of accountability stemming from the financial crisis led to the 2011 Occupy Wall Street movement which quickly expanded into hundreds of American cities. The enactment of the Affordable Care Act generated both national support and backlash around the administration's effort to expand the federal government's role in healthcare. The United States Supreme Court ruled in Citizens United v. FEC that laws restricting campaign finance donations were unconstitutional leading to a nationwide argument and scholastic research on campaign finance reform and the impact corporations have in American democracy. Conservative opposition such as the Tea Party Movement coalesced and won the 2010 midterm elections in a landslide. Obama's approval ratings fluctuated prior to the 2012 presidential election due to factors such as the economy and opposition to Obamacare. The Obama administration recovered and won widespread public praise following the assassination of Osama bin Laden, the mastermind behind the 9/11 attacks, and a strong, co-ordinated response to Hurricane Sandy. Congress stalled on the administration's immigration reform agenda, prompting Obama to sign an executive order establishing the DACA program. Prior to the election, the administration was scrutinized for its response to the 2012 Benghazi terrorist attacks in which sitting US ambassador J. Christopher Stevens was assassinated.

Barack Obama was re-elected in the 2012 presidential election becoming the first African American president to secure two terms. The second term of the Obama administration saw historic congressional gridlock and tension between the Democratic administration and the Republican controlled Congress. Following a shooting at Sandy Hook Elementary, a nationwide debate about gun legislation reopened which saw the Obama administration aggressively lobby for gun control. These legislative proposals died in Congress leading to the expansion and emphasis on local community organizing instead. During Obama's second term issues such as climate change emerged in the public consciousness, leading the administration to adopt clean power directives and sign the Paris Climate Accord. Also during this time, the United States began to change its attitudes towards gay rights. Following the repeal of Don't Ask, Don't Tell, the nationwide movement to legalize gay marriage began to see significant gains and public acceptance. In 2015 the Supreme Court ruled in Obergefell v. Hodges that restrictions to gay marriage were deemed unconstitutional and gay marriage became legal. A series of allegations of police misconduct and the shooting of Michael Brown prompted the Obama Administration to investigate the Ferguson Police Department. Michael Brown's death coupled with the shooting of Trayvon Martin kickstarted the Black Lives Matter Movement and a national conversation about the relationship police have with African Americans. Racism remained a central issue in 2015 which saw an armed gunman massacre nine African Americans in the historic Mother Emmanuel AME Church in Charleston, South Carolina. One of the victims was South Carolina state senator Clementa C. Pinckney, a senior pastor of the church. The racial motivations of the shooting pressured South Carolina governor Nikki Haley to remove the Confederate Flag from the South Carolina State House. The final year of the Obama presidency was marked by bitterness between the administration and Congress. Following the death of Justice Antonin Scalia, Obama appointed Merrick Garland to fill the Supreme Court vacancy. The political division coupled with the lame-duck president played a role in Senate Majority Leader Mitch McConnell's decision to forgo any action on behalf of the Senate to vet Garland. This decision ignited a political firestorm as both sides doubled down on their decision leading to a debate on potential unconstitutional misconduct by McConnell. Garland's nomination was ultimately ignored and the seat was filled by Neil Gorsuch, a Trump appointee. Islamic terrorism became a major issue in US political discourse following the 2015 Paris attacks leading to an increase in American military invention alongside European allies overseas. During the Obama administration, major technological advancements converged to create military drones, which are the subject of an ongoing debate about the ethical use of this technology.

On June 16, 2015 businessman and former reality TV star Donald Trump announced his candidacy for President of the United States. Trump made media headlines for his controversial conduct and behavior, garnering both support and criticism. Trump became renowned for this unorthodox approach with some analysts concluding that it was ultimately helpful to the Trump campaign as he received over $2 billion in free media coverage. Trump emerged as the Republican front-runner by June 2016, receiving the nomination in July. Hillary Clinton, former US Secretary of State, US Senator, and First Lady declared her candidacy in April 2015 and became the front-runner. Clinton clashed with Senator Bernie Sanders, opening a divide in the Democratic party between the centrists and progressive faction of which Sanders' held the bulk of his support. Clinton successfully outmaneuvered Sanders and won the Democratic nominee, becoming the first woman in US history to be a presidential nominee for either major US party. Social media played an unprecedented role in the outcome of the election as voter behavior was impacted by what they saw on social media. Voters on both sides were bombarded with social media misinformation and fake news. One such source of misinformation was the Russian government which flooded platforms, especially Facebook with fake news and content designed to invoke an emotional response. Both candidates were extremely disliked and were the most unpopular in modern American history. The Trump campaign heavily invested in Facebook and used the platform to contain the outrage following the release of the Access Hollywood tape. In summer 2016, the Democratic National Committee was hacked and internal emails were released on the website WikiLeaks. The leaked emails gave rise to a right-wing conspiracy theory, Pizzagate that dominated online political discourse. Political polarization accelerated dramatically in the months leading up to the election. Most pollsters concluded that Hillary Clinton would ultimately defeat Trump but differed by the margin of victory.

Despite losing the popular vote, Donald Trump won the election in one of the most stunning upsets in American history. Following Trump's inauguration, a series of protests commenced around the world. In his first 100 days, Trump signed a series of executive orders that reduced government's support the Affordable Care Act, expanded infrastructure projects, and instituted an entry ban on foreign nationals from seven Muslim majority countries. Trump authorized a missile strike in Syria in response to the Khan Shaykhun chemical attack. Trump's first 100 days received an unprecedented amount of media coverage, the majority of such coverage was negative leading to a nationwide debate on media bias. Following Trump's inauguration, the US intelligence community definitively concluded that the Russian government had interfered in the presidential election. In May 2017, Deputy United States Attorney General Rod Rosenstein appointed former FBI director Robert Mueller as Special Counsel to investigate the extent of the Russian interference and whether or not the Trump campaign was involved. The special counsel investigation loomed over the majority of Trump's presidency. Some of Trump's close associates such as Paul Manafort were investigated and charged by the special counsel's office. On August 11, alt-right groups consisting of neo-Nazis, neo-Confederates, white nationalists, Klansmen, & other far-right militias gathered in Charlottesville, Virginia to protest the removal of a Robert E. Lee statue. The event called Unite the Right, descended into violence, and the following day saw a white supremacist drive a vehicle into a crowd of counter-protestors killing one and injuring thirty-five. President Trump's response to the attack garnered widespread controversy. His remarks such as, "very fine people on both sides," were met with condemnation. Trump was further criticized for his administration's response to Hurricane Maria. 2018 saw Trump pivot US foreign policy and began rapprochement with North Korea. His visit with North Korea was overshadowed by the unfolding sex scandal involving pornstar Stormy Daniels.

== History by government period ==
=== Obama presidency ===
Barack Obama's tenure as the 44th president of the United States began with his first inauguration on January 20, 2009, and ended on January 20, 2017. Obama, a Democrat from Illinois, took office after defeating the Republican nominee John McCain in the 2008 presidential election. Four years later, he won re-election in the 2012 presidential election, after defeating the Republican nominee Mitt Romney. Alongside Obama's presidency, the Democratic Party also held their majorities in the House of Representatives during the 111th U.S. Congress following the 2008 elections, thereby attained an overall federal government trifecta. Obama is the first African American president, the first multiracial president, the first non-white president, (Note: Obama is mixed race; his mother Ann Dunham was white, though Obama considers himself African-American) and the first president born in Hawaii. Obama was constitutionally limited to two terms (the second re-elected Democrat President to be so) and was succeeded by Republican Donald Trump, who won the 2016 presidential election against Obama's preferred successor, Hillary Clinton. Historians and political scientists rank him among the upper tier in historical rankings of American presidents.

Obama's accomplishments during the first 100 days of his presidency included signing the Lilly Ledbetter Fair Pay Act of 2009 relaxing the statute of limitations for equal-pay lawsuits; signing into law the expanded Children's Health Insurance Program (S-CHIP); winning approval of a congressional budget resolution that put Congress on record as dedicated to dealing with major health care reform legislation in 2009; implementing new ethics guidelines designed to significantly curtail the influence of lobbyists on the executive branch; breaking from the Bush administration on a number of policy fronts, except for Iraq, in which he followed through on Bush's Iraq withdrawal of US troops; supporting the UN declaration on sexual orientation and gender identity; and lifting the 7½-year ban on federal funding for embryonic stem cell research. Obama also ordered the closure of the Guantanamo Bay detention camp, in Cuba, though it remained open throughout his presidency. He lifted some travel and money restrictions to the island.

Obama signed many landmark bills into law during his first two years in office. The main reforms include: the Affordable Care Act, sometimes referred to as "the ACA" or "Obamacare", the Dodd–Frank Wall Street Reform and Consumer Protection Act, and the Don't Ask, Don't Tell Repeal Act of 2010. The American Recovery and Reinvestment Act and Tax Relief, Unemployment Insurance Reauthorization, and Job Creation Act served as economic stimuli amidst the Great Recession. After a lengthy debate over the national debt limit, he signed the Budget Control Act of 2011 and the American Taxpayer Relief Act of 2012. In foreign policy, he increased US troop levels in Afghanistan, reduced nuclear weapons with the United States–Russia New START treaty, and ended military involvement in the Iraq War. He gained widespread praise for ordering Operation Neptune Spear, the raid that killed Osama bin Laden, who was responsible for the September 11 attacks. In 2011, Obama ordered the drone-strike killing in Yemen of al-Qaeda operative Anwar al-Awlaki, who was an American citizen. He ordered military involvement in Libya in order to implement UN Security Council Resolution 1973, contributing to the overthrow of Muammar Gaddafi.

After winning re-election by defeating Republican opponent Mitt Romney, Obama was sworn in for a second term on January 20, 2013. During this term, he condemned the 2013 Snowden leaks as unpatriotic, but called for more restrictions on the National Security Agency (NSA) to address privacy issues. Obama also promoted inclusion for LGBT Americans. His administration filed briefs that urged the Supreme Court to strike down same-sex marriage bans as unconstitutional (United States v. Windsor and Obergefell v. Hodges); same-sex marriage was legalized nationwide in 2015 after the Court ruled so in Obergefell. He advocated for gun control in response to the Sandy Hook Elementary School shooting, indicating support for a ban on assault weapons, and issued wide-ranging executive actions concerning global warming and immigration. In foreign policy, he ordered military interventions in Iraq and Syria in response to gains made by ISIL after the 2011 withdrawal from Iraq, promoted discussions that led to the 2015 Paris Agreement on global climate change, drew down US troops in Afghanistan in 2016, initiated sanctions against Russia following its annexation of Crimea and again after interference in the 2016 US elections, brokered the Joint Comprehensive Plan of Action nuclear deal with Iran, and normalized US relations with Cuba. Obama nominated three justices to the Supreme Court: Sonia Sotomayor and Elena Kagan were confirmed as justices, while Merrick Garland was denied hearings or a vote from the Republican-majority Senate.

=== Trump presidency ===
Donald Trump's first tenure as the president of the United States began on January 20, 2017, when he was inaugurated as the 45th president, and ended on January 20, 2021. Trump, a Republican, took office after defeating Democratic nominee Hillary Clinton in 2016. Upon his inauguration, he became the first president in American history without prior public office or military background. Trump made an unprecedented number of false or misleading statements during his 2016 campaign and first presidency. Alongside Trump's first presidency, the Republican Party also held their majorities in the House of Representatives and the Senate during the 115th U.S. Congress following the 2016 elections, thereby attaining an overall federal government trifecta. Trump's first presidency ended following his re-election defeat to Democratic nominee Joe Biden in 2020.

Trump signed the Tax Cuts and Jobs Act of 2017, the First Step Act, and a partial repeal of the Dodd–Frank Act. He appointed Neil Gorsuch, Brett Kavanaugh, and Amy Coney Barrett to the Supreme Court. Trump sought substantial spending cuts to major welfare programs, including Medicare and Medicaid. He was unsuccessful in his efforts to repeal the Affordable Care Act, but rescinded the individual mandate. Trump reversed numerous environmental regulations, and withdrew from the Paris Agreement on climate change. He enacted various tariffs, triggering retaliatory tariffs from China, Canada, Mexico, and the European Union. He withdrew from the Trans-Pacific Partnership negotiations and signed the United States–Mexico–Canada Agreement (USMCA), a successor to the North American Free Trade Agreement with modest changes. Trump oversaw the third-biggest federal deficit growth of any president; it significantly increased under Trump due to simultaneous spending increases and tax cuts.

Starting in 2018, Trump implemented a controversial family separation policy for migrants apprehended at the United States–Mexico border. His demand for the federal funding of a border wall resulted in the longest U.S. government shutdown in history, a record that stood until 2025, under his second term. In 2020, he deployed federal law enforcement forces in response to racial unrest.

Trump's "America First" foreign policy was characterized by unilateral actions and a disregard for traditional norms and foreign allies. His administration implemented a major arms sale to Saudi Arabia; denied citizens from six Muslim-majority countries entry into the United States; recognized Jerusalem as the capital of Israel; and brokered the Abraham Accords, a series of normalization agreements between Israel and various Arab states. Trump withdrew United States troops from northern Syria, allowing Turkey to occupy the area. His administration made a conditional deal with the Taliban to withdraw United States troops from Afghanistan in 2021. Trump met North Korea's leader Kim Jong Un three times. He withdrew the United States from the Iran nuclear agreement and later escalated tensions in the Persian Gulf by ordering the assassination of Iranian general Qasem Soleimani.

Robert Mueller's Special Counsel investigation (2017–2019) concluded that Russia interfered to favor Trump's candidacy in the 2016 election and that, while the prevailing evidence "did not establish that members of the Trump campaign conspired or coordinated with the Russian government", possible obstructions of justice occurred during the course of that investigation. Trump attempted to pressure Ukraine to announce investigations into Biden. This triggered Trump's first impeachment by the House of Representatives on December 18, 2019; he was acquitted by the Senate on February 5, 2020.

Trump reacted slowly to the COVID-19 pandemic, ignored or contradicted many recommendations from health officials in his messaging, and promoted misinformation about unproven treatments and the availability of testing. After signing the CARES Act, Trump initiated Operation Warp Speed to facilitate and accelerate the development, manufacturing, and distribution of COVID-19 vaccines.

Following his loss in 2020 to Biden, Trump falsely alleged widespread electoral fraud and initiated an extensive campaign to overturn the results. At a rally on January 6, 2021, Trump urged his supporters to march to the Capitol, where the electoral votes were being counted by Congress in order to formalize Biden's victory. A mob of Trump supporters stormed the Capitol, suspending the count and causing Vice President Mike Pence and other members of Congress to be evacuated. On January 13, the House voted to impeach Trump an unprecedented second time for incitement of insurrection, but he was later acquitted by the Senate again on February 13, after he had already left office.

Trump later ran for re-election again in 2024, and he was successfully re-elected to a second, non-consecutive term, after defeating Democratic nominee Kamala Harris. He started his second presidency on January 20, 2025, as the 47th president, thus becoming the second former U.S. president to return to office. (Note: The first was Grover Cleveland, following his victory in the 1892 presidential election.)

=== 2009–2011, 111th Congress ===
Democrats swept into 2009 with control over the White House and both Houses of Congress. Nancy Pelosi (D-CA) was Speaker of the House of Representatives and Harry Reid (D-NV) was Senate Majority Leader. The Democratic supermajority in the Senate was guaranteed with the election of Al Franken (D-MN) in January and when Republican Arlen Specter (D-PA) switched to the Democratic Party. Major legislative victories included the Lilly Ledbetter Fair Pay Act of 2009 (providing equal pay for women), American Recovery and Reinvestment Act of 2009 (designed to preserve existing jobs and to create new ones), Patient Protection and Affordable Care Act (extending health-care coverage to millions; popularly called "Obamacare"), Dodd–Frank Wall Street Reform and Consumer Protection Act (the first major financial reform since the 1930s), Small Business Jobs Act of 2010 (providing financing for small businesses), 2010 Tax Relief Act (temporary tax relief for the middle class), Don't Ask, Don't Tell Repeal Act of 2010 (allowing gay, lesbian, and transgender people to serve openly in the military), and the James Zadroga 9/11 Health and Compensation Act (provides support for first responders who survived the September 11, 2001, terrorist attacks).

The Senate confirmed the appointments of two women to the Supreme Court: Sonia Sotomayor (the first Latino to hold the post) and Elena Kagan.

President Barack Obama's September 9, 2009, Congressional address promoting health care reform was interrupted by Congressman Joe Wilson (R-SC) who shouted: "You lie!" when Obama said his health care plan would not cover undocumented immigrants. The Democrats' supermajority in the Senate ended on February 4, 2010, with the election of Scott Brown (R-MA).

President Obama unsuccessfully tried to close Guantanamo Bay detention camp for suspected terrorists. Conservative opponents of Obama formed the Tea Party movement in February 2009. Obama was granted the 2009 Nobel Peace Prize, despite presiding over the war in Afghanistan and the Iraq War. The Deepwater Horizon oil spill was a major ecological disaster from April through September 2010. A renegotiated free trade agreement with South Korea went into effect on December 3, 2010.

The 2010 United States elections resulted in major victories for the Republican Party.

=== 2011–2013, 112th Congress ===
Following the 2010 elections, Republicans gained control of the House of Representatives while the Democratic majority in the Senate was narrowed. John Boehner (R-OH) was Speaker of the House and Harry Reid (D-NV) was Senate Majority Leader. The Congress was unproductive, passing only 219 bills that were signed into law, compared to 383 in the 111th Congress. Congress failed to pass legislation to keep the Postal Service solvent, and they allowed the Violence Against Women Act to lapse for the first time since it was passed in 1994.

The United States entered trade agreements with Colombia and Panama. Payroll Taxes were cut and the low income tax rates established by the George W. Bush administration were kept in place. The National Defense Authorization Act for Fiscal Year 2012 not only provided funding for the DoD and authorization for state governors to request military help in the case of natural disasters but also controversially contained anti-terrorist provisions that allow the indefinite detention of American citizens on American soil. The Budget Control Act of 2011 called for a reduction in spending in order to lower the federal debt.

Congresswoman Gabby Giffords (D-AZ) and nineteen other people were shot in Tucson on January 8, 2011. Twenty children and six adults were killed in a shooting at Sandy Hook Elementary School in Newtown, Connecticut, sparking a debate about gun laws.

The United States joined NATO in military intervention in Libya, which led to the death of Muammar Gaddafi. In May 2011 Navy SEALS killed Al-Qaeda leader Osama bin Laden. On September 11, 2012, members of Ansar al-Sharia attacked the American diplomatic compound in Benghazi, resulting in the deaths of U.S. Ambassador to Libya J. Christopher Stevens and three other Americans. The United States stepped up drone attacks in Pakistan, Somalia, and Yemen, targeting Yemeni-American Muslim cleric Anwar al-Awlaki on September 30, 2011. His 16-year-old son, American-born Abdulrahman al-Awlaki, was killed two weeks later.

The popular movement against income inequality known as Occupy Wall Street began with a march on Wall Street, New York City in February 2011.

Trayvon Martin, an unarmed black 17-year-old, was fatally shot by George Zimmerman in Sanford, Florida. The killing received widespread attention focusing on aspects including the possible role of Martin's race and the initial lack of prosecution against Zimmerman, and it raised questions about Florida's "Hold your ground" gun law.

In June 2012, Wisconsin Governor Scott Walker won a recall election against Milwaukee Mayor Tom Barrett.

President Obama was reelected in 2012, defeating Republican Mitt Romney. Democrats gained two Senate seats. Democrats won the popular vote and eight House seats, but it was not enough to regain control of the lower chamber.

=== 2013–2015, 113th Congress ===
The Senate had a Democratic majority, but the House had a Republican majority. Harry Reid (D-NV) was Senate Majority Leader and John Boehner (R-OH) was Speaker of the House. The 113th was one of the least productive in history, notable for brinkmanship (shutting down the government for 16 days in 2013 and almost shutting it down again in 2014). According to Gallup, only 15% of Americans approved of the Congress' work, only 1% more than the all-time low of the 112th Congress. The Senate passed immigration legislation but House Republicans killed it; the House passed gun control legislation, but it did not pass the Senate. House Republicans offered legislation on the economy and health care (voting 50 times to repeal Obamacare), but these did not pass the Senate. Senator Rand Paul (R-KY) filibustered the nomination of John Brennan as CIA director for thirteen hours. Ted Cruz (R-TX) wasted a record 21 hours of the Senate's time by reading Green Eggs and Ham by Dr. Seuss as a complaint (but not a filibuster) against health care. Senator John McCain (R-AZ) called the Senate's lack of work "disgraceful."

Among the few bills passed were a five-year farm bill and reform of VA benefits. They reauthorized the Violence Against Women Act and the Pandemic and All-Hazards Preparedness Act. They supported the government of Ukraine and the opposition in Venezuela.

Information about global surveillance was released in June 2013. The Supreme Court overturned key provisions of the Voting Rights Act of 1965 and the Defense of Marriage Act.

Republicans swept the November 2014 elections.

=== 2015–2017, 114th Congress ===
Republicans controlled the House of Representatives with John Boehner (R-OH) as Speaker until October 29, 2015, when Paul D. Ryan (R–WI) was chosen to replace him. Mitch McConnell (R-KY) was Senate Majority leader.

The USA Freedom Act was an updated version of the Patriot Act with certain restrictions on spying on American civilians. President Obama threatened to veto the Iran Nuclear Agreement Review Act of 2015, but the bill passed the Senate 98-1 and Obama withdrew his threat. The Every Student Succeeds Act replaced the No Child Left Behind Act. The Justice Against Sponsors of Terrorism Act, which allows survivors of the September 11, 2001, terrorist attacks to sue Saudi Arabia, which passed over Obama's veto. Obama also vetoed a bill authorizing the Keystone Pipeline. The Fixing America's Surface Transportation Act provided $305 billion for highway improvement without increasing the gas tax. The Internet Tax Freedom Act made the prohibition on taxing Internet services permanent. The Sexual Assault Survivors' Rights Act provides increased rights for victims of sexual assault. The 21st Century Cures Act was a victory for Big Pharma, allowing new drugs to get on the market more easily.

The Prime Minister of Israel Benjamin Netanyahu was invited by Speaker Boehner to address a joint session of Congress regarding sanctions against Iran without consulting President Obama in March 2015. Other world leaders to address Congress were Afghanistan President Ashraf Ghani (March 2015), Japanese Prime Minister Shinzō Abe (April 2015), Pope Francis (September 2015), and Indian Prime Minister Narendra Modi addressed joint sessions of Congress. President Obama thawed relations with Cuba, removing the country from the list of state sponsors of terrorism, reestablishing diplomatic relations, and ending the wet foot, dry foot policy that gave preferential treatment to Cuban immigrants. The United States joined the Paris Agreement to lower carbon emissions in an effort to keep the global average rise in temperatures below 2 °C on September 3, 2016.

In June 2016, a domestic terrorist killed 49 people and wounded 53 others in the Orlando nightclub shooting. When Speaker Ryan refused to allow debate on gun legislation, 60 Democratic House Members staged a 2016 United States House of Representatives sit-in but failed to force a vote. In the Senate, Chris Murphy (D-CT), successfully launched a 15-hour filibuster that led to two votes on gun control, barring guns from suspected terrorists and expanding background checks on gun purchasers. Senate Minority Leader Harry Reid (D-NV) blamed "Republicans who take their marching orders from the National Rifle Association" for the defeat of both bills. In March 2016 Obama nominated Judge Merrick Garland, 63, to fill the Supreme Court seat vacated by the death of Antonin Scalia, but Majority Leader Mitch McConnell refused to hold hearings or bring the nomination up for a vote. Short-handed, the court deadlocked on a number of issues and declined to hear others.

In an upset victory, Donald Trump (R) defeated Hillary Clinton (D) in the 2016 United States presidential election. Clinton won the popular vote (62,523,126 to 61,201,031) but Trump won the Electoral College (306 to 232) and the election. There were seven Faithless electors in the 2016 United States presidential election. Democrats gained two Senate seats but Republicans retained control. Democrats had a net gain of six House seats but Republicans retained their majority. Each party won six of the twelve gubernatorial elections. Six states approved ballot measures liberalizing marijuana use, five passed gun or hunting legislation, and four increased the minimum wage.

=== 2017–2019, 115th Congress ===
The inauguration of Donald Trump (R) as 45th President was on January 20, 2017. The 2017 Women's March on January 21, 2017, involved between 3.3. million and 4.6 million marchers and was the largest demonstration in American history.

Republicans controlled the House of Representatives with Paul D. Ryan (R–WI) as Speaker. Mitch McConnell (R-KY) continued as Senate Majority leader.

The 115th Congress reformed the federal criminal justice system, responded to the opioid crisis, imposed sanctions on Russia, North Korea, and Iran, and legalized industrial hemp via the 2018 farm bill. They passed tax reform legislation, which is expected to increase the deficit by $1.4 trillion. Despite multiple attempts, they failed to repeal and replace the Affordable Care Act, pass comprehensive immigration reform, or restrict SNAP benefits. The government was shut down three times: in January 2018 over a dispute about Deferred Action for Childhood Arrivals DACA) and the Mexican border wall, Senator Rand Paul's (R-KY) tantrum on February 9, and the December 22, 2018, to January 25, 2019 shutdown over the border wall. The last resulted in Trump's declaration of a State of Emergency on February 15. Day Without Immigrants 2017 protests were held throughout the United States in February 2017 to demonstrate the importance of immigration.

On June 14, 2017, Congressman Steve Scalise (R-LA) and two aides were hit by gunfire during a practice session for the annual Congressional baseball game.

President Trump nominated and the Senate approved two Supreme Court justices: Neil Gorsuch and Brett Kavanaugh. Kavanaugh's Judiciary Committee was concerned primarily with allegations of sexual misconduct. The Music Modernization Act modernizes music copyright laws and America's Water Infrastructure Act of 2018 relaxes water pollution restrictions.

Trump signed a number of executive orders to overturn actions undertaken by President Obama, prioritizing economic expediency over environmental concerns. He withdrew from the Trans-Pacific Partnership and restricted immigration by refugees. He began construction of the border wall and instituted a Temporary ban on immigration from several Muslim majority countries.

Allegations about Russian interference in the 2016 United States elections and during the November 2016 – January 2017 transition period surface, resulting in the resignation of National Security Advisor Michael Flynn. FBI Director James Comey is fired because of the way he handled the investigation. The first call for the impeachment of President Trump is issued on May 7, 2017. Robert Mueller began his investigation on May 17.

=== 2019, 116th Congress ===
Democrats controlled the House of Representatives with Nancy Pelosi (D-CA) as Speaker.

Jeff Van Drew (R-NJ) changed from Democrat to Republican on December 19, 2019. Mitch McConnell (R-KY) continued as Senate Majority leader.

== History by issue ==
=== Recession of 2008 ===
The Great Recession was a severe financial crisis from December 2007 to June 2009 that began when the U.S. housing market crashed, and large amounts of mortgage-backed securities and derivatives lost significant value. The United States lost 8.7 million jobs and U.S. households lost $19 trillion of net worth.

The Obama administration spent much of its time and effort into improving the economy and addressing the issues that led to the recession. Obama signed the Dodd-Frank Act on July 21, 2010, to give the government expanded regulatory power over the financial sector. Real GDP regained its pre-recession peak in the second quarter of 2011, and in March 2013, the Dow Jones Industrial Average broke its 2007 high. Workers and households did less well. The unemployment rate was at 5% at the end of 2007, reached 10% in October 2009, and did not recover to 5% until 2015. Household income in the United States did not surpass its pre-recession level until 2016.

== See also ==
- Other decade overviews:
  - 2020s in history
  - 2020s in United States history
- UK decade overviews:
  - 2010s in United Kingdom history
  - 2020s in United Kingdom history
