= Maggie Wallace Glover =

American politician

Member of the South Carolina Senate
- In office 1992–2004
- Preceded by: Frank Gilbert
- Succeeded by: Kent M. Williams

Member of the South Carolina House of Representatives
- In office 1989–1992
- Preceded by: Frank Gilbert
- Succeeded by: Jesse E. Hines

Personal details
- Born: Maggie Wallace; August 29, 1948 (age 78) Florence, South Carolina, U.S.
- Party: Democratic
- Children: 1
- Education: Fayetteville State University (B.A.); Francis Marion College (M.Ed.)

Maggie Wallace Glover (born August 29, 1948) is a former American Democratic politician, serving in the South Carolina State Senate and the South Carolina House of Representatives.

== Early life and education ==
Glover was born in Florence, South Carolina, the daughter of Ethel (née Greene) and Fulton Wallace. She received a B.A. from Fayetteville State University in 1970, and an M.Ed. from Francis Marion College in 1982.

== Political career ==
=== South Carolina State Senate ===
Glover was the first African-American woman to be elected as a member of the South Carolina Senate, serving District 30 from 1992 to 2004.

=== South Carolina House of Representatives ===
Glover was also a member of the South Carolina House of Representatives serving District 62 from 1989 to 1992.

==== Confederate flag ====
While serving in the House in 1991, Glover introduced a resolution calling for the removal of the Confederate flag from atop the South Carolina State House. Co-sponsors of the resolution were Kenneth E. Bailey Sr., Donald W. Beatty, Joe Ellis Brown, Curtis B. Inabinett, John L. Scott Jr., Candi Waites, Lucille Whipper, Juanita Mitchell White and DeWitt Williams.
