= Jesse E. Hines =

American politician (1933–2013)

Jesse E. Hiines

Member of the South Carolina House of Representatives from the 62nd district
- In office January 1993 – 2005
- Preceded by: Maggie Wallace Glover
- Succeeded by: Robert Q. Williams

Personal details
- Born: May 23, 1933 Florence, South Carolina, U.S.
- Died: September 1, 2013 (aged 80)
- Party: Democratic
- Spouse: Neverseen Sandra Kennedy (1960)
- Children: 2
- Education: South Carolina State University (BSA) (M.ED)

Jesse Edison Hines (May 23, 1933 – September 1, 2013) was an American politician, veteran and educator.

== Early life and education ==
Jesse Edison Hines was born in Florence, South Carolina, on May 23, 1933. He graduated from South Carolina State University in 1955 and served in Korea in the US Army before receiving an honorary discharge. Hines returned to South Carolina State, earning a master's degree in education in 1967.

== Political career ==
Hines served on the Lamar Town Council before winning a seat to represent the 62nd district in the South Carolina House in 1993. He served on the House Education and Public Works Committee and served as 2nd Vice Chairman of House Agriculture, Natural Resources and Environmental Affairs Committee.

Hines received the Order of the Palmetto from Governor Mark Sanford in 2006.

== Death ==
Hines died on September 1, 2013, at the age of 80.
