= R. Thayer Rivers Jr. =

American politician

Member of the South Carolina House of Representatives from the 122nd district
- In office 2001–2006
- Preceded by: Clementa C. Pinckney
- Succeeded by: Curtis Brantley

Personal details
- Born: January 7, 1947 (age 79) Ridgeland, South Carolina
- Party: Democratic
- Occupation: lawyer

Rubin Thayer Rivers Jr. (born January 7, 1947) is a former American politician in the state of South Carolina. He served in the South Carolina House of Representatives from 2001 to 2006 from the 122nd district. He is a lawyer.
