= Korey Williams (politician) =

American politician

Member of the South Carolina House of Representatives from the 122nd district
- Incumbent
- Assumed office November 9, 2026
- Preceded by: Bill Hager

Personal details
- Party: Democratic
- Website: Campaign website

Korey Williams is an American politician. A member of the Democratic Party, he is the member for the 122nd district of the South Carolina House of Representatives. He was elected at the 2026 election.
