= Curtis Brantley =

American politician

Member of the South Carolina House of Representatives from the 122nd district
- In office 2007–2012
- Preceded by: R. Thayer Rivers, Jr.
- Succeeded by: Bill Bowers

Personal details
- Born: January 20, 1940 (age 86) Ridgeland, South Carolina
- Party: Democratic
- Occupation: educator

Curtis Brantley (born January 20, 1940) is an American former politician in the state of South Carolina. He served in the South Carolina House of Representatives from 2007 to 2012 from the 122nd district. He is an educator and former school principal and college professor.
