= Shedron D. Williams =

American politician

Member of the South Carolina House of Representatives from the 122nd district
- In office November 12, 2018 – November 14, 2022
- Preceded by: William Bowers
- Succeeded by: Bill Hager

Personal details
- Born: July 29, 1967 (age 59) Colleton County, South Carolina
- Party: Democratic
- Education: Morehouse College (B.S.)

Shedron D. Williams (born July 29, 1967) is an American politician. He is a former member of the South Carolina House of Representatives from the 122nd District, serving since 2018. He is a member of the Democratic party. Williams was defeated in the 2022 general election by Bill Hager.
