= Robert Q. Williams =

American politician

Robert Williams
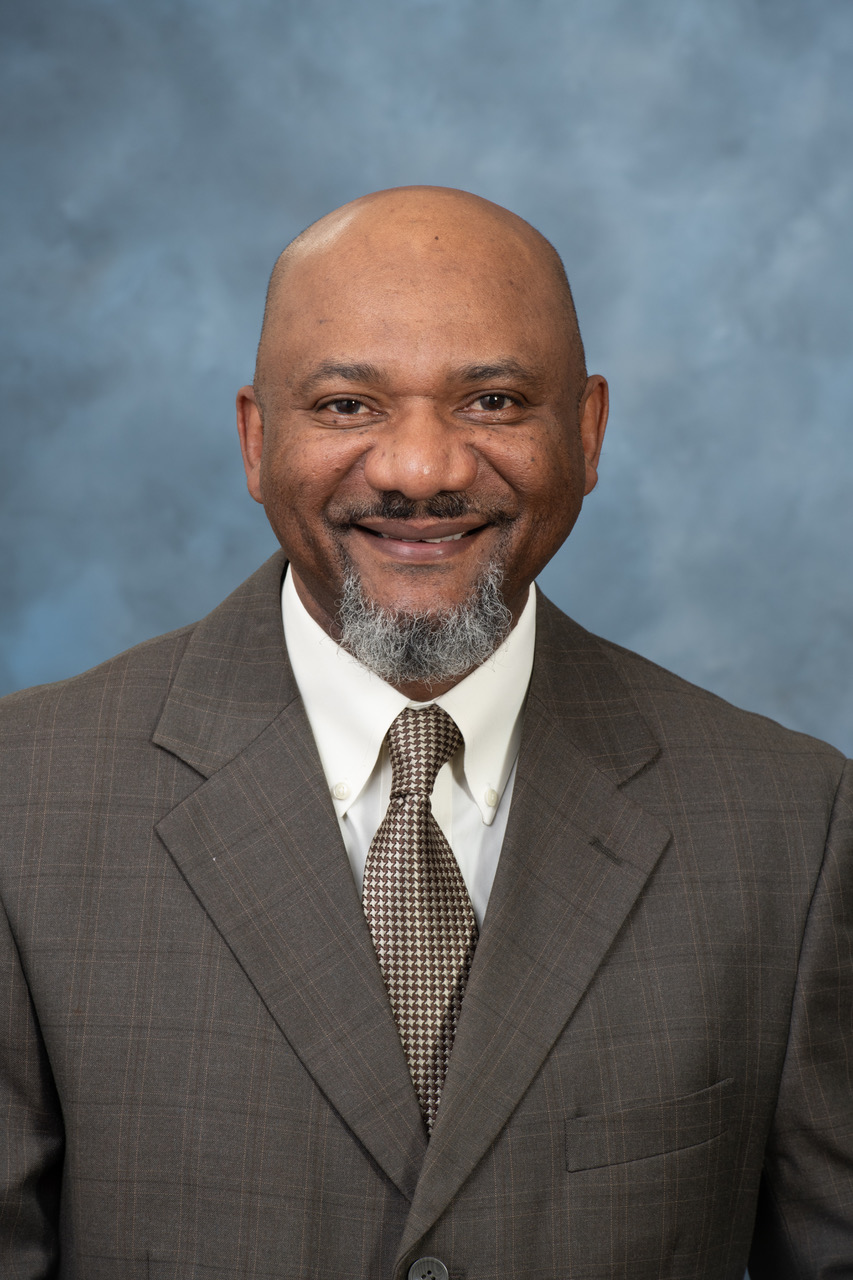

Member of the South Carolina House of Representatives from the 62nd district
- Incumbent
- Assumed office January 2007
- Preceded by: Jesse E. Hines

Personal details
- Born: July 12, 1964 (age 62) Darlington, South Carolina, U.S.
- Party: Democratic
- Spouse: Janice Ham (1992–present)
- Children: 3
- Education: Voorhees College (BS); Troy University (MPA)
- Website: Campaign website

Robert Quintin Williams (born July 12, 1964) is an American politician, veteran, and business development consultant who serves as a member of the South Carolina House of Representatives from the 62nd District since 2007. A member of the Democratic party., Williams ran in the 2018 elections for a seat at the United States House of Representatives, but lost to Republican Tom Rice 59.6% to 40.3% in the 7th district of South Carolina He ran again in 2020 but lost to Rice a second time.

== Early life and career ==
Williams was born in Darlington, South Carolina on July 12, 1964. As a young child, Williams was a Cub Scout and coached sports like basketball, football, and baseball. Williams is an Atlanta Braves fan. However, he used to like the Los Angeles Dodgers in the early 80's. Williams grew up with his parents in Baptist faith.

=== Education ===
After graduating from his local public school, Williams attended the historically black Voorhees College in Denmark, South Carolina in 1982–1984 before joining the military. Upon returning, Williams went back to Voorhees College from 1990–1991 to finish his Bachelor of Science degree on funds from the G.I. Bill and is in the Voorhees College Hall of Fame. Williams entered the workforce as a social worker; helping the community and elderly people while also working for the department of special needs and disabilities.

=== Family and personal life ===
Williams met his wife Janice Ham in high school through a friend in the early 90's and they have been married since 1992 with three children: Rodrick, Jacobie, and Jarell Williams. Janice serves as a teacher and community organizer.

=== U.S. Military ===
Having served in the Guard, Williams received the Army Achievement Medal in both 2002 and 2004 while also receiving the Army Commendation Medal in 2005. Now having retired, Williams enters the realm of politics.

=== Politics ===
Williams realized that he wanted to make a change in the community in 2002 after the September 11 attacks happened in New York City. In 2003, Williams ran to become a state representative of South Carolina with the goals of revitalizing the education system. However, Williams went to war in 2004. After returning from the war, Williams ran again for the same position of State Representative of the 62nd District of South Carolina and secured it in 2007.

== South Carolina State of Representatives ==
Williams was elected as a state representative in the 62nd district and started office on January 3, 2007, and is still the incumbent representative of the district. He serves as 2nd Vice Chair of the Invitations and Memorials Resolutions Committee and as a member of the Labor, Commerce and Industry Committee.
