= William Bowers (politician) =

American politician (born 1952)

Member of the South Carolina House of Representatives from the 122nd district
- In office 2013–2018
- Preceded by: Curtis Brantley
- Succeeded by: Shedron D. Williams

Member of the South Carolina House of Representatives from the 120th district
- In office 1997–2013

Personal details
- Born: July 25, 1952 (age 73) Brunson, South Carolina, U.S.
- Party: Democratic

William Knight Bowers (born July 25, 1952) is an American politician. He is a former member of the South Carolina House of Representatives from the 122nd District, serving from 2013 to 2018. He is a member of the Democratic party.

Before serving as a representative, Bowers earned a B.S. from Clemson University, and MBA and PhD degrees from the University of South Carolina.

== Political career ==
In 1996, Bowers defeated three challengers in the Democratic primary. He went on to defeat Republican Charlie Drawdy Jr. to win election to South Carolina State House district 120. He ran unopposed in both the primary and general election in 1998. He again defeated Drawdy in the 2000 election. He ran unopposed in 2002 and 2004. In 2006, he defeated Republican Joe Flowers. He again ran unopposed in 2008. In 2010, he defeated Republican Dan Lawrence.

In 2012, Bowers was redistricted to District 122. He defeated incumbent Curtis Brantley in the Democratic primary. He was unopposed in the general election. Bowers again defeated Brantley in 2014. He faced no opposition in the general election.

In 2016, Bowers faced three other candidates in the Democratic primary, coming in first, but forced into a runoff. Bowers defeated Shedron Williams in the Democratic primary runoff.

In 2018, Bowers lost to Williams in the Democratic primary. Williams went on to win the general election.

== Election history ==
State House of Representatives District 122, Democratic Primary, 1996
Party	Candidate	Votes	%
Democratic	Bill Bowers	1,901	48.47
Democratic	R. Thayer Rivers	1,151	28.35
Democratic	Hugh T. Lightsey	753	19.20
Democratic	Billy Landers	117	2.98

State House of Representatives District 122, Democratic Primary Runoff, 1996
Party	Candidate	Votes	%
Democratic	Bill Bowers	2,272	71.24
Democratic	R. Thayer Rivers	917	28.75

State House of Representatives District 120, 1996
Party	Candidate	Votes	%
Democratic	Bill Bowers	6,902	67.9
Republican	Charlie Drawdy Jr.	3,259	32.1

State House of Representatives District 120, 2000
Party	Candidate	Votes	%
Democratic	Bill Bowers	7,935	72.5
Republican	Charlie Drawdy Jr.	3,014	27.5

State House of Representatives District 120, 2006
Party	Candidate	Votes	%
Democratic	Bill Bowers	5,267	58.7
Republican	Joe Flowers	3,701	41.3

State House of Representatives District 120, 2010
Party	Candidate	Votes	%
Democratic	Bill Bowers	6,920	64.45
Republican	Dan Lawrence	3,810	35.48

State House of Representatives District 122, Democratic Primary, 2012
Party	Candidate	Votes	%
Democratic	Bill Bowers	3,421	56.56
Democratic	Curtis Brantley	2,627	43.44

State House of Representatives District 122, Democratic Primary, 2014
Party	Candidate	Votes	%
Democratic	Bill Bowers	4,110	57.78
Democratic	Curtis Brantley	3,003	42.22

State House of Representatives District 122, Democratic Primary, 2016
Party	Candidate	Votes	%
Democratic	Bill Bowers	2,420	42.31
Democratic	Curtis Brantley (withdrew)	1,492	26.08
Democratic	Shedron Williams	1,479	25.86
Democratic	John Polk	329	5.75

State House of Representatives District 122, Democratic Primary Runoff, 2016
Party	Candidate	Votes	%
Democratic	Bill Bowers	3,438	51.02
Democratic	Shedron Williams	3,300	48.98

State House of Representatives District 122, Democratic Primary, 2018
Party	Candidate	Votes	%
Democratic	Shedron Williams	2,910	52.55
Democratic	Bill Bowers	2,628	47.45
