= Bill Hager (South Carolina politician) =

American engineer and politician (born 1960)

Member, South Carolina House of Representatives
- In office November 14, 2022 – November 9, 2026
- Preceded by: Shedron D. Williams
- Succeeded by: Korey Williams

Personal details
- Born: February 6, 1960 (age 66) Charlotte, NC
- Party: Republican
- Spouse: Elizabeth Jolly
- Education: The Citadel

William Winston Hager (born 7 February 1960) is an American engineer and politician.

== Biography ==
Bill Hager was born on 7 February 1960 in Charlotte, North Carolina, to parents Roland and Charlene Hager. He later moved to Hampton, South Carolina, earned a Bachelor of Science degree in electrical engineering at The Citadel, and worked as an engineer.

Hager served as chair of the Hampton County Economic Development Commission and ran for a seat on the Hampton County Council in 2020. In 2022, Hager defeated incumbent Shedron D. Williams of South Carolina House of Representatives District 122.
