= Middleton-Rutledge-Pinckney family =

The Middleton-Rutledge-Pinckney family is a family of politicians from the United States.

- Henry Middleton 1717-1784, Delegate to the Continental Congress from South Carolina 1774, South Carolina State Senator 1778.
  - Arthur Middleton 1742-1787, Delegate to the South Carolina Constitutional Convention 1776, Delegate to the Continental Congress from South Carolina 1776, South Carolina State Representative 1778, South Carolina State Senator 1781. Son of Henry Middleton.
    - Henry Middleton 1770-1846, South Carolina State Representative 1802, South Carolina State Senator 1810, Governor of South Carolina 1810-1812, U.S. Representative from South Carolina 1815-1819, U.S. Minister to Russia 1820-1830. Son of Arthur Middleton.
    - Edward Rutledge 1749-1800, Delegate to the Continental Congress 1774-1776, South Carolina State Representative 1782, Governor of South Carolina 1798-1800. Brother-in-law of Henry Middleton.
    - John Rutledge 1739-1800, Delegate to the Continental Congress from South Carolina 1774, President of South Carolina 1776-1778, Governor of South Carolina 1779, Justice of the U.S. Supreme Court 1789-1791, Chief Justice of the South Carolina Supreme Court 1791-1794, Chief Justice of the U.S. Supreme Court 1795. Brother to Edward Rutledge.
      - Charles Cotesworth Pinckney 1746-1825, South Carolina State Senator 1799-1804, U.S. Minister to France 1796-1797, candidate for Vice President of the United States 1800, candidate for President of the United States 1804, 1808. Son-in-law of Henry Middleton.
        - John Rutledge, Jr. 1766-1819, member of the South Carolina State Legislature, U.S. Representative from South Carolina 1797-1803. Son of John Rutledge.
          - Wiley Blount Rutledge 1894-1949, Judge of the United States Court of Appeals for the District of Columbia Circuit 1939–43, Associate Justice of the Supreme Court of the United States, 1943–49. Great-great-grandson of Edward Rutledge.

NOTE: Charles Cotesworth Pinckney was also brother of South Carolina Governor Thomas Pinckney and cousin of U.S. Senator Charles Pinckney.

== See also ==
- List of United States political families
