= United States–Russia oil deal =

Negotiations

As of October 2026, the United States and Russia are engaged in negotiations for a sale of Russian energy assets, including foreign assets of Russian energy company Lukoil, to an investment group, as part of a proposed Ukraine peace deal. The two main US negotiators of the deal are U.S. Special Envoy Steve Witkoff and President Trump's son-in-law, Jared Kushner. The deal includes oil fields, gas stations, and oil refineries across the world.

== Background ==
Lukoil is a privately held Russian energy company. Following October 2025 sanctions by the United States government on Lukoil and Rosneft following the 2022 invasion of Ukraine, the company was forced to begin selling off its international assets.

== Investment group ==
The investment group in negotiations for the purchase of Lukoil assets is led by American billionaire businessman Todd Boehly. Boehly is a co-owner of the Los Angeles Dodgers, and donated $2 million to the pro-Trump super PAC MAGA Inc. and Trump's second inauguration between December 2024 and 2025.

Other members of the investment group include:

- The US government, which is taking a stake in the deal via the International Development Finance Corporation, an agency that lends to and investments in international projects;
- International Holding Company, an Emirati holding company overseen by Abu Dhabi royal family member and national security adviser Sheikh Tahnoon bin Zayed Al Nahyan. Tahnoon controls another fund that has purchased a large stake in World Liberty Financial, the Trump family's cryptocurrency company that is run in part by Steve Witkoff's sons, Alex Witkoff and Zach Witkoff;
- Power International Holding, a Qatari conglomerate controlled by Syrian-born Qatari brothers Moutaz Al-Khayyat and Ramez Al-Khayyat. Both brothers attended Trump's second inauguration in 2025, and subsequently formed a partnership with Trump's daughter Ivanka Trump and her husband, Jared Kushner, to help finance a multibillion dollar southern Albanian luxury resort project.
