= Bill Hager (footballer) =

Australian rules footballer

Personal information
- Full name: Bill Hager
- Born: 29 October 1925
- Died: 21 November 2011 (aged 86)
- Height: 185 cm (6 ft 1 in)
- Weight: 75 kg (165 lb)

Playing career^{1}
Years	Club	Games (Goals)
1945	North Melbourne	3 (0)
- ^{1} Playing statistics correct to the end of 1945.

Bill Hager (29 October 1925 – 21 November 2011) was an Australian rules footballer who played with North Melbourne in the Victorian Football League (VFL).
