= Juanita Mitchell White =

American politician (1929–2011)

Member of the South Carolina House of Representatives from the 122nd district
- In office 1980–1995

Personal details
- Born: October 12, 1929
- Died: May 6, 2011 (aged 81) Hardeeville, South Carolina
- Party: Democratic

Juanita Mitchell White (October 12, 1929 – May 6, 2011) was an American politician.

From Hardeeville, South Carolina, White lived in Philadelphia, Pennsylvania, where she grew up in and raised her family. She then returned to Jasper County, South Carolina. White served in the South Carolina House of Representatives from 1980 to 1995 and was a Democrat.
