= Dicey =

Dicey is a surname and a given name. Notable people and characters with the name include:

== Surname ==
- A. V. Dicey (1835–1922), British jurist and constitutional theorist
- Bill Dicey (1936–1993), American blues harmonicist and singer
- Cluer Dicey (1715–1775), English newspaper proprietor and publisher
- Edward Dicey (1832–1911), British author, editor and journalist
- William Dicey (1690–1756), British printer, publisher, and medicine seller

== Given name ==
- Dicey Langston (1766–1837), American patriot spy

== Fictional characters ==
- Dicey Johnson, in the 1949 American drama film Pinky
- Dicey Reilly, titular heroine of an Irish folk song
- Dicey Tillerman, the protagonist of the Tillerman Cycle, a series of seven novels by American author Cynthia Voigt

== See also ==
- Dicy, former commune in Bourgogne-Franche-Comté, France
