= Matt Baumgardner =

American artist (1955–2018)

Matthew Clay Baumgardner (February 5, 1955 – November 20, 2018) was an American contemporary artist and National Endowment for the Arts Visual Artist Fellow, whose work was featured in multiple public and private collections including the Gibbes Museum of Art and the Greenville Museum of Art in Greenville, SC. After graduating with a master of fine arts degree from the University of North Carolina at Chapel Hill in 1982, he was involved for over three decades in New York City's art scene.

After leaving New York for Travelers Rest, South Carolina, in 2006, he was featured in various magazine, newspaper, and online articles, some focused on his art, and others on his home and studio.

== Biography ==
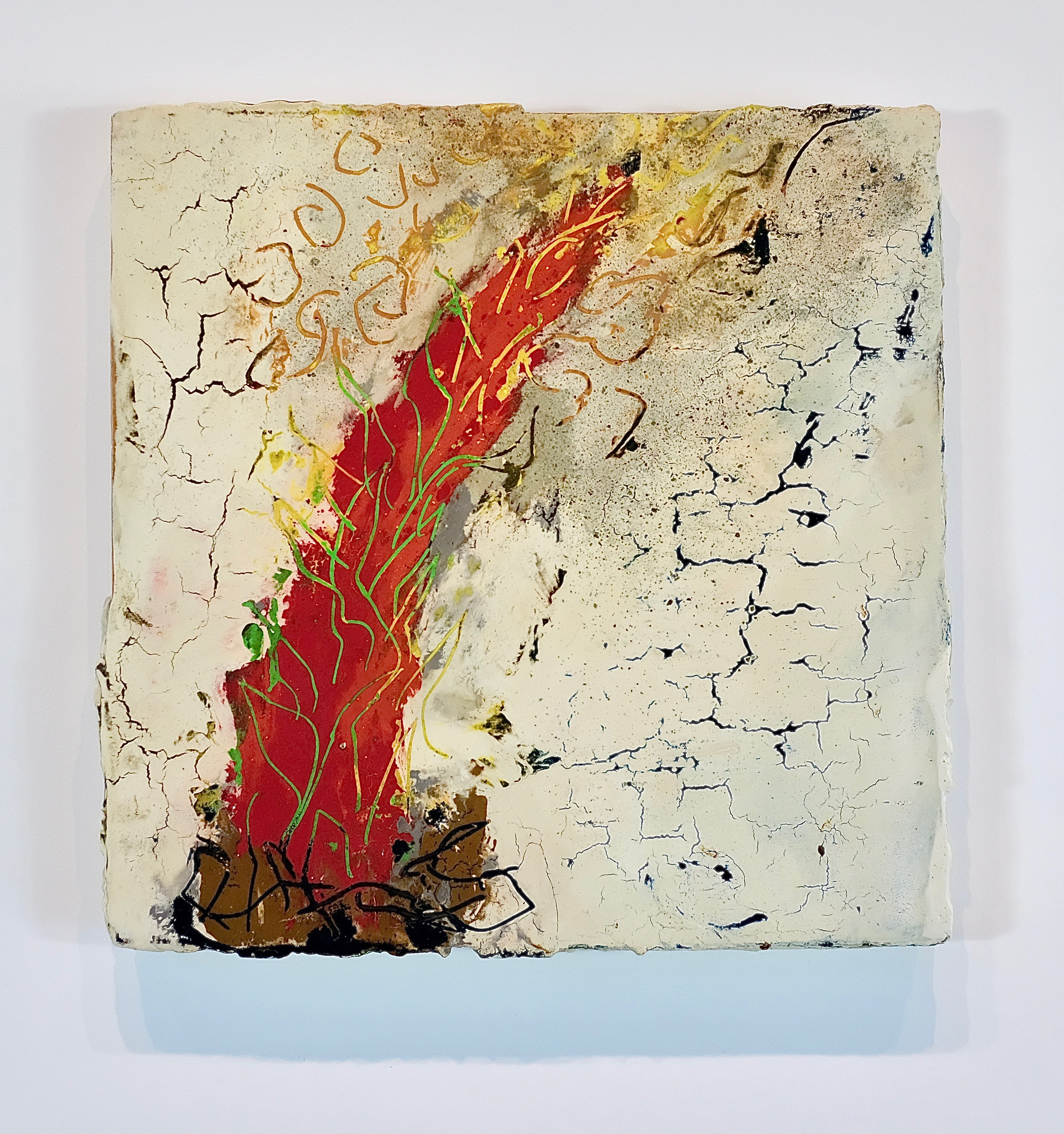
The Fire Inside, 1995

Born in Columbus, Ohio, on February 5, 1955, Baumgardner graduated from Upper Arlington High School in 1973. As a child in Bernardsville, New Jersey, he was drawn to exploring the local woodlands, developing a love of the natural world and its four elements—fire, air, earth, and water—that would permeate his life and art. Inspecting insects with his microscope, tending his grounds with abundant flowers and edible plants, swimming in the Caribbean with his daughters or laps in the pool at his studio, lighting fireworks or a burn pile of pruned branches, and contemplating sunsets in the foothills of the Blue Ridge mountains all inspired his work.

My work imparts a transformative experience that resonates with my longings to channel universal and spiritual planes; I want to transport the spirit, to remind us all that we are perfect beings passing through a transient world. My soul craves expression through poetic and timeless art that beckons the viewer to return time and again to find renewal and fresh experiences."

Baumgardner earned his MFA from the University of North Carolina-Chapel Hill in 1982, under Peter Plagens. Previously, he had studied under South Carolina artists Carl Blair, Emery Bopp, and Darell Koons at Bob Jones University, graduating in 1978, and then taught art to grade schoolers at Bob Jones Academy until 198-. During this time in the Carolinas, he received purchase awards from the Mint Museum in Charlotte, NC (Biennial Exhibition of Piedmont Painting and Sculpture), and the Spartanburg Art Museum, and had a painting chosen by New York Times art critic, Roberta Smith, for the Gibbes Museum of Art in Charleston for its 30th Annual GSCA Exhibition. His work was exhibited in shows including at the Reston Fine Arts Center in Virginia; Auckland Art Museum in North Carolina; Huntington Museum of Art in West Virginia; Greater Birmingham Fine Arts Exhibition in Alabama; Greenville County Museum of Art (Fifth Annual Curator’s Choice Exhibition) and Clemson University Lee Hall Gallery in South Carolina (Five South Carolina Artists) and SC Arts Commission Annual Exhibition.

Baumgardner lived in New York City from 1982 through 2004, where most of his artwork was created, at studios in Red Hook, on Columbia Street, and East Second Street, as well as in Trenton, New Jersey. His archives from this period include paintings and works on paper in scales ranging from his highly energized, Abstract Expressionist pieces of the 1980s to his reductive work, reflecting appreciation of the grid, beginning in the late 1990s. During this phase of his career, his work was exhibited in 15 solo and over 30 group shows, including galleries in New York City, Boston, Chicago, Houston, Scottsdale, Omaha, and Zurich, Switzerland.

In 1993, Baumgardner was awarded the highest honor for an individual artist bestowed by the National Endowment for the Arts, a visual arts fellowship in painting, for his birch plywood series, representing the beginning of his signature technique of embedded glyphs in multiple layers of pigmented gypsum. This series also earned him a solo show in 1993 at the Charles Cowles Gallery in NYC, concurrent with a solo show for Dale Chihuly.

Baumgardner raised his four daughters in Manhattan with his former wife Heather Evans.

In 2006, Baumgardner relocated to a rural setting between Greenville, SC and Asheville, NC. In 2009, he designed and contracted to build a live/work studio on an acre of land, and began to paint again in December after a five-year hiatus. The Greenville County Museum of Art gave him a major exhibition from November 2011 to January 2012. The museum showcased 63 of his artworks spanning 27 years, published a color plate catalogue and acquired a painting for its permanent collection. After his move to South Carolina, Baumgardner established a following of collectors and collaborated with Eric Brown Design for placement of his work. In late 2015, Baumgardner exhibited at Art San Diego, winning the Director's Choice Award for a 72 x 72 inch triptych, and at Spectrum Miami. He was represented by Forre & Co. Fine Art in Aspen, Colorado starting in 2016. His studio continued as a venue for showing his work to collectors, gallerists, designers and museum staff. His work was also at the nearby Hotel Domestique, with which he has collaborated starting in 2014, and at Forre & Co. Fine Art Gallery.

== Solo exhibitions ==
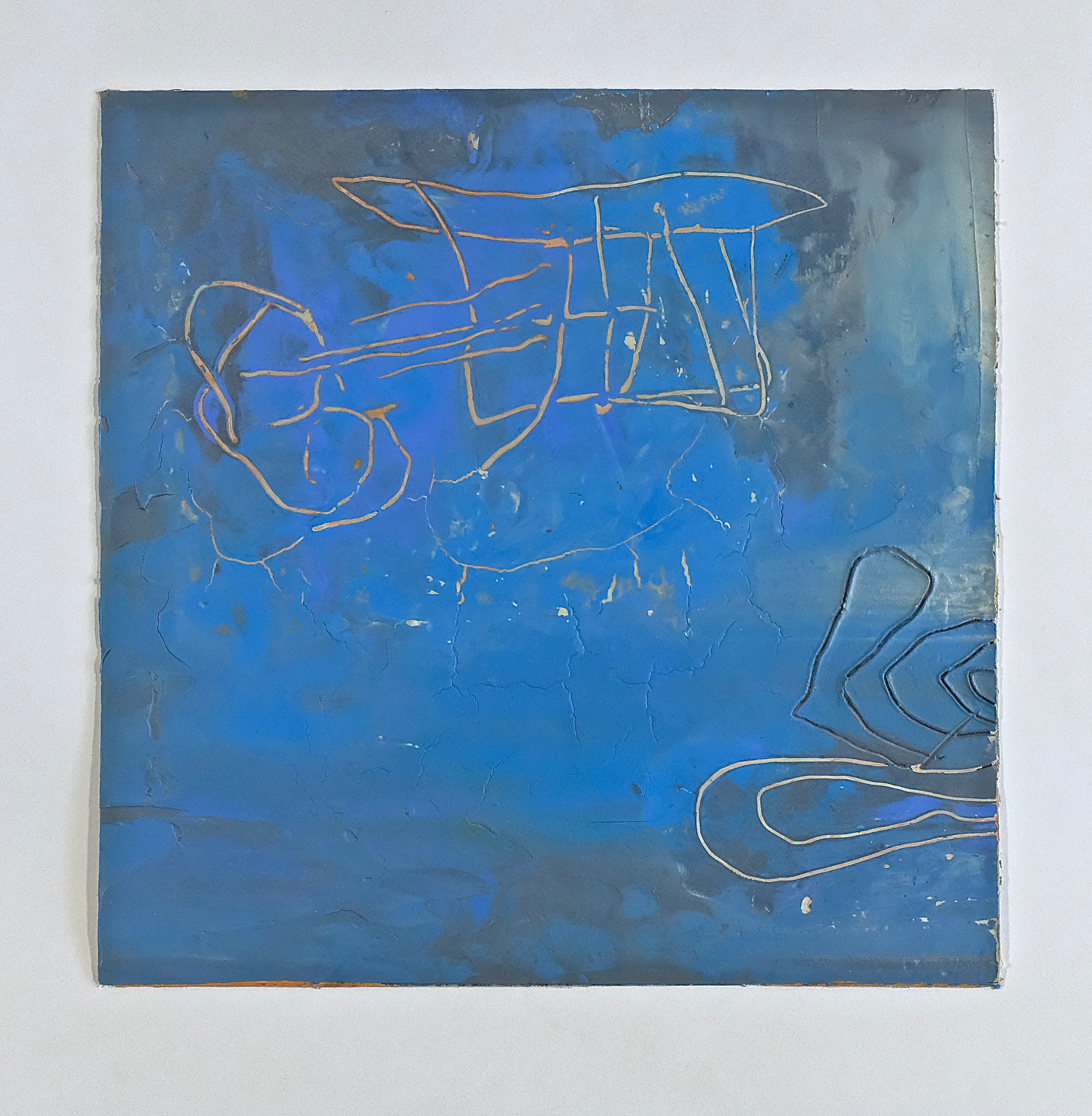
Free Flying, 2017

- 2012 – Greenville County Museum of Art, “Made for Another World”, 63 works from 1985-2011, with 57 page catalog and museum purchase for permanent collection, Greenville, SC
- 2002 and 1998 – Bentley Gallery, Scottsdale, AZ
- 2002 and 2001 – Jeffery Coploff Fine Art, New York, NY
- 1998 – MD Modern Gallery Houston, TX
- 1995 – Carrie Secrist Gallery, Chicago, IL
- 1993 – Charles Cowles Gallery, New York, NY
- 1992 – Howard Yezerski Gallery, Boston, MA
- 1989 and 1988 – Wessel O’Connor Ltd, New York, NY
- 1987 – Wilkov-Goldfeder, New York, NY
- 1981 – Sumter Gallery, Sumter, SC
- 1980 – Presbyterian College, Clinton, SC

== Selected exhibitions ==
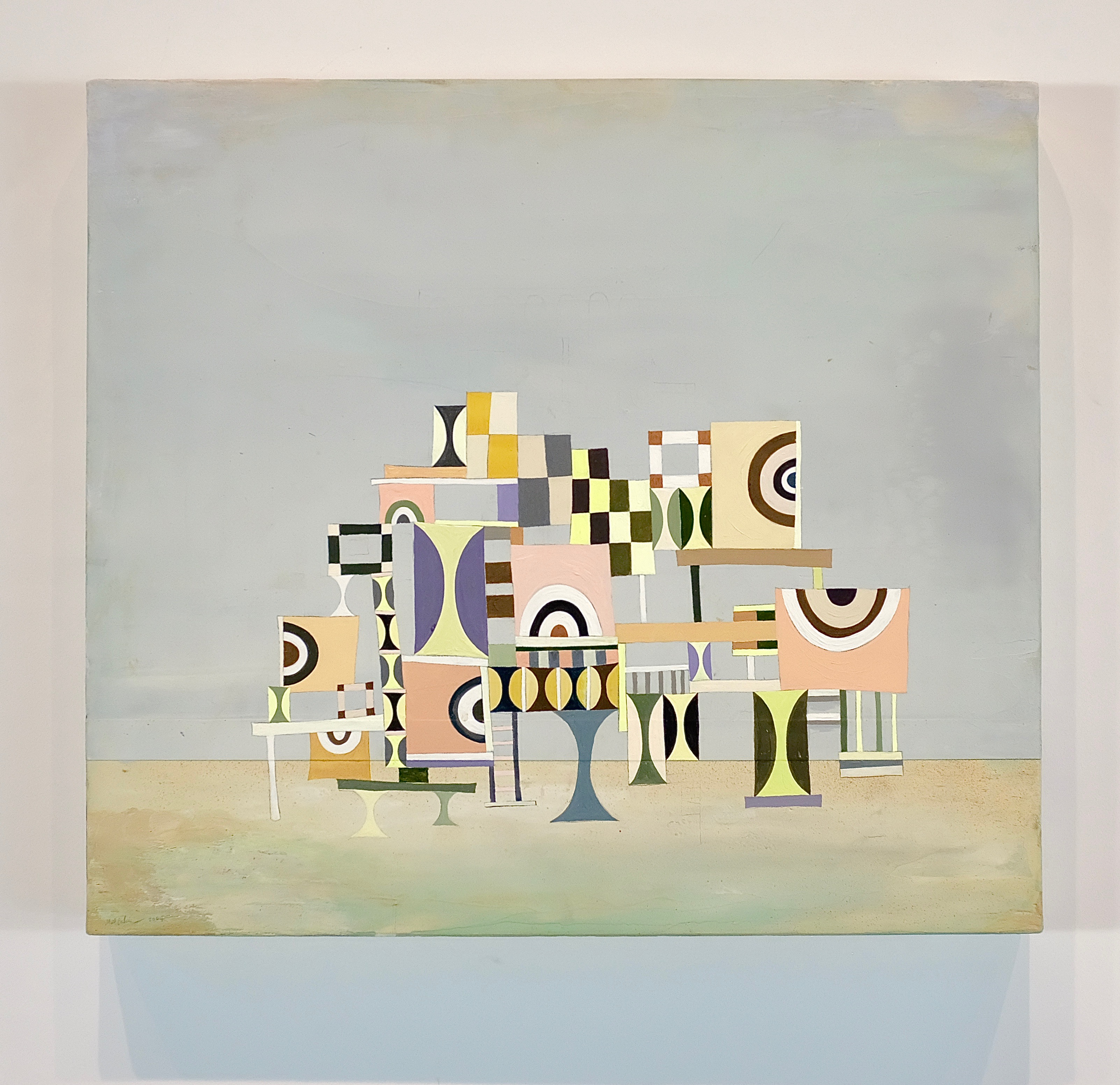
Tropical Languor #3, 2004

- 2018, 2017, and 2016 – Forre & Co. Fine Art, Aspen, CO (and 2017, 2016 Vail, CO)
- 2015 – Spectrum Miami, Miami, FL
- 2015 – Art San Diego, San Diego, CA*
- 2009 – The National Arts Club, New York, NY
- 2000 – Jeffrey Coploff Fine Art, New York, NY
- 1999 – Robert Kidd Gallery, Birmingham, MI
- 1999 – Bemis Center for Contemporary Arts, Omaha, NE
- 1999 – LewAllen Contemporary, Santa Fe, NM
- 1997 – Bentley Gallery, Scottsdale, AZ
- 1995 – Galerie Marie-Louise Wirth, “American Topography” Zurich, Switzerland
- 1993 – New Museum of Contemporary Art, New York, NY
- 1993 – Trans Hudson Gallery, Jersey City, NJ
- 1991 – Stephanie Theodore Gallery, New York, NY
- 1989 – Wessel O’Conner Ltd, New York, NY
- 1988 – Trenton City Museum, Trenton, NJ
- 1987 –Wilkov-Goldfeder, “Exhibit A” New York, NY
- 1987 – Wilkov-Goldfeder, Summer Exhibition New York, NY
- 1986 – Mokotoff Gallery, “Raw Energy Show” New York, NY
- 1986 – Mokotoff Gallery, “Heads” New York, NY
- 1985 – Edward Thorp Gallery, “Abstract Painting” New York, NY
- 1985 – Hudson Center Gallery, “New Abstraction” New York, NY
- 1985 – Mokotoff Gallery, “The Gesture Painters” New York, NY
- 1983 – Greater Reston Arts Center, Reston, VA
- 1982 – Ackland Art Museum, Chapel Hill, NC
- 1982 – Huntington Museum of Art, “Exhibition 280” Huntington, WV
- 1981 – Gibbes Museum of Art, “30th Annual GSCA Exhibition” Charleston, SC
- 1981 – Mint Museum, “Biennial Exhibition of Piedmont Painting and Sculpture” Charlotte, NC
- 1981 – Greater Birmingham Fine Arts Exhibition, Birmingham, AL
- 1980 – Clemson University Lee Hall Gallery, “Five South Carolina Artists” Clemson, SC
- 1980 – Greenville County Museum of Art, “Fifth Annual Curator’s Choice Exhibition” Greenville, SC
- 1980 – Clemson University Lee Hall Gallery, “SC Arts Commission Annual Exhibition” Clemson, SC
