= Dr. Bateman's Pectoral Drops =

Patent medicine

Dr Bateman's Pectoral Drops (also known as ‘Batemans Original Pectoral Drops’, and 'Bateman's and Stoughton's drops’) was a popular patent medicine for disorders of the chest or lungs during the 18th, 19th, and early 20th centuries in Britain and North America. It was later marketed as a remedy for ‘all Rheumatic and Chronic complaints, in pains of the limbs, bones, and joints, for influenza, and in violent colds'.

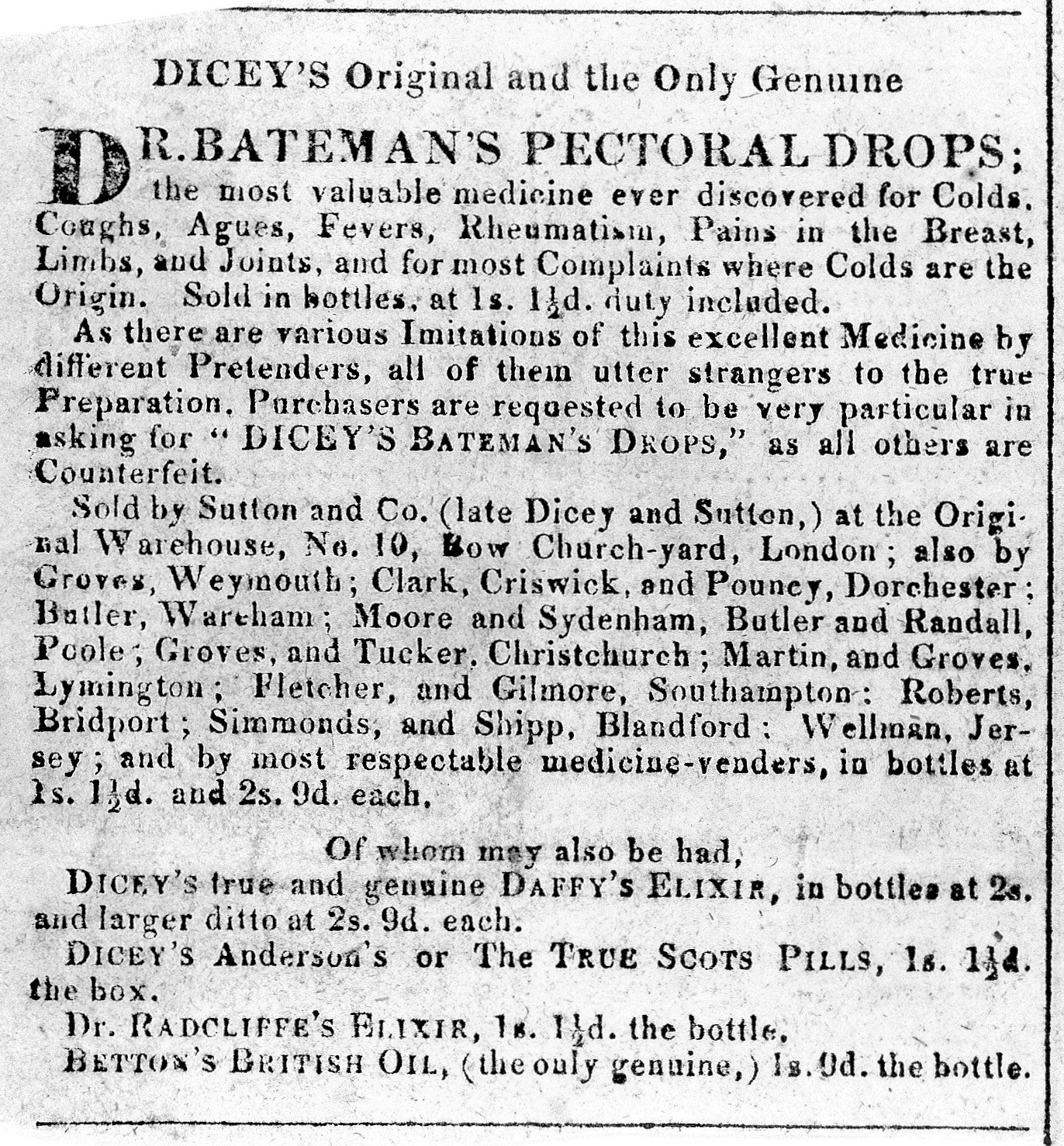
19th century newspaper advertisement for Dr Bateman's Pectoral Drops

== Ingredients ==
The medicine was similar to paregoric; a tincture of opium and camphor. To this was added catechu together with anise flavouring and a colouring agent. Over the years there were several different formulas. Bateman’s Drops were advertised as being intended for infants and adults and was dosed accordingly.

== Origins ==
The original formula was developed by Benjamin Okell of Northampton, before 1711, when a patent was granted for its manufacture. Advertisements are first known in the Northampton Mercury newspaper in 1720.

== Marketing ==
=== UK ===
Okell went into partnership with the proprietors of the Northampton Mercury, William Dicey and Robert Raikes, and from August 1721 the medicine was advertised in the imprint of the newspaper. From 1722, John Cluer of Bow Churchyard joined the partnership and marketed the medicine in London. About 1724 Okell published A short treatise of the virtues of Dr. Bateman's pectoral drops: the nature of the distempers they cure, and the manner of their operation, printed by Raikes and Dicey.

In 1726 the patent was re-issued to Okell, Dicey, Raikes and Cluer. Cluer published An abstract of the patent in the same year.

John Cluer died in 1728 and his business was continued by his widow (William Dicey’s sister), until 1731, thereafter by Thomas Cobb (her second husband) until 1736, when the business was assigned to William Dicey. Raikes last advertised the medicine in ‘’The Daily Gazetteer’’ 14 July 1741, but thereafter it is only advertised as produced by William Dicey and Co. Benjamin Okell died circa 1753 and his widow, Elizabeth, took over her husband’s share, although Benjamin’s name continued to be mentioned in advertisements for the medicine until January 1755. William Dicey’s will of 1756 mentions his having only a one third share in the medicine. After William’s death that year the medicine was marketed by Cluer Dicey & Co until c.1770 and thereafter Dicey & Co.

In 1759 Cluer Dicey & Co. described as the ‘original proprietors’ of the medicine won a case brought against Thomas Jackson for counterfeiting the medicine.

About 1792 Dicey & Co. went into partnership with Edward Beynon at 10 Bow Churchyard. After Beynon's death in 1800 it became Dicey and Sutton, and later to Messrs W. Sutton & Co. of Enfield Middlesex who continuing to market it throughout the nineteenth and early twentieth centuries. W. Sutton & Co. (Druggists' Sundries), London, Ltd., of Enfield, in Middlesex, successors to Dicey & Co. at Bow Churchyard, currently sells Bateman's Pectoral Drops in the early 1950s.

By the mid-nineteenth century there were a variety of different manufacturers and formulae on the market, Thus an advertisement in The Derby Mercury, for 5 January 1842, is for ‘Barclays’ Bateman's Drops’,.

=== United States ===
In 1731 the medicine was advertised in the ‘’New-York Weekly Journal’’ advertised “An Abstract of the Patent,” printed by John Peter Zenger with the name of James Wallace as local agent authorized to sell it.

After the United States gained independence, American apothecaries marketed their own counterfeit versions. Versions continued into the 20th century when, for example—thanks to the 1906 Food and Drug Act—in 1918 a Reading, Pennsylvania, firm was fined fifty dollars for marketing an “adulterated” and “misbranded” version as Dr. Bateman's Pectoral Drops.

== Dangers ==
Richard Reece, writing in 1822, criticised the medicine in the following terms.

"The active ingredient of this composition is opium, which in chronic rheumaticism and chronic cough may, in one case out of a hundred afford temporary relief. In ‘’acute’’ cases as ‘fever, colds, and cough,’ it is capable of doing irreparable mischief, by disordering the head, constipating the bowels, and accelerating the circulation. In humid asthma and constitutional cough this remedy, by checking expectoration, would prove very injurious. It is in fact a disguised solution of opium which in the hands of ignorance is a very dangerous remedy."
