= The Lodge Gallery =

Art gallery in Manhattan, New York

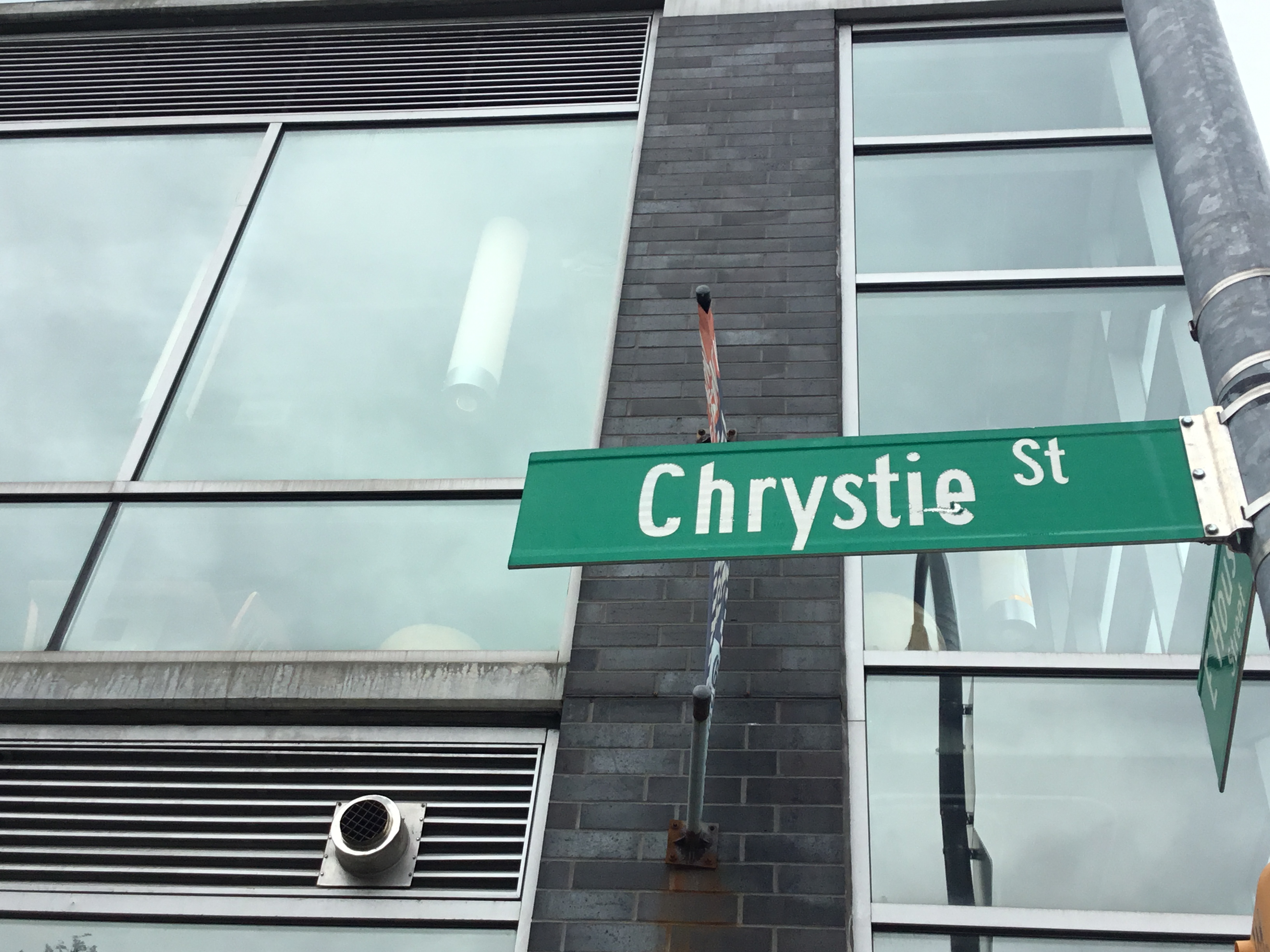
- Formation: 2013
- Founders: Jason Patrick Voegele, Keith Schweitzer
- Founded at: 131 Chrystie Street, New York, NY 10002, United States
- Dissolved: 2018
- Type: Art gallery
- Headquarters: New York City
- Coordinates: 40.719455°N 73.993370°W

The Lodge Gallery (2013–2018) was a contemporary art gallery located on New York City's Lower East Side. Described as "a hybrid between art salon, exhibition space, community portal, and aesthetic experimentation," the gallery was active in the primary market, and aimed to present art in an "experimental, multi-dimensional exhibition format" that balanced "familiarity and experimentation" in a "non-canonical ... New York, Like You've Never Seen It Before."

Featuring some 50 exhibitions in five years, the Lodge exhibited the drawing, painting, watercolor, illustration, sculpture, photography, and installations of an array of international talent that included Kira Nam Greene, Esperanza Mayobre, Ted Riederer, Noah Becker, John Dunivant, Chad Moore, Ryan Schneider, Kristen Schiele, Kent Henricksen, Elizabeth Livingston, Sirikul Pattachote, Tawan Wattuya, Doug Young, Dana James, among others. In 2016, the Lodge also hosted vocalist Tony Bennett's serenade at the launch of artist Frank Porcu's exhibition Relics: In Pursuit of Mastery.

Named "Young New York Art Dealers to Watch" by Artnet News in 2015 and "top dealers" at Volta 2016, for the exhibition "Paul Brainard: ROASTED," which feature[d] humorous portraits of New York art world fixture Paul Brainard by 32 of his friends and creative peers, including Walter Robinson, Dawn Frasch, and Alfred Steiner, the Lodge was co-owned by gallerists and curators Keith Schweitzer and Jason Patrick Voegele. Schweitzer is currently an owner/director of DAVID&SCHWEITZER Contemporary, a gallery located in Bushwick, Brooklyn. He has also been a guest speaker at the Brooklyn Museum. Voegele is a graduate of the Pratt Institute master's program in painting and art history. A recurring critic for the New York Foundation for the Arts "Doctor’s Hours" program, Voegele also serves as the executive director of both NY Art Consultant and Republic Worldwide.

== See also ==
- Art gallery
- Contemporary art
- Salon
