= Richard Marshall (publisher) =

Eighteenth century Publisher

Richard Marshall (died 1779) was responsible for co-running, and then independently running the Dicey print publishing business in London, which existed during the middle decades of the eighteenth century. Initially, this was run by Cluer Dicey (1715–1775) alone, yet in 1753 Marshall purchased a quarter of the business, and in 1764 he became an equal partner. After the death of Dicey in 1775, he became the sole owner. When Marshall began working in 1753, the business operated from Aldermary Churchyard, London, where it remained until his death.

Marshall continued to publish popular prints, chapbooks, broadside ballads and popular songs, illustrating all of these with woodcuts, just as he had with Dicey. He probably kept in print everything he had inherited from the business's predecessors, the only change being the addition, perhaps, of his own imprint. With the exception of a few maps, however, none of these have survived. He published some new prints, for example updated editions of maps and satires completed in the Dutch style, but these were very limited. However, he did move into new areas such as children's publishing, possibly influencing his son John Marshall.

When Marshall died in 1779, the business was divided between his son John, his nephew James, and his widow Eleanor. John received 50 percent, whilst the others received 25 percent each. The new business became known as ‘John Marshall and Co.’, operating like this for a further ten years until John took sole ownership in 1789.
