= Douglas Young =

Douglas or Doug Young may refer to:

- Sir Douglas Young (judge) (1883–1973), British judge and Liberal Party politician
- Douglas Young (1900–1972), one half of the British comedy duo Kenway and Young
- Douglas Young (classicist) (1913–1973), Scottish poet, scholar, and translator; leader of the Scottish National Party
- Douglas Young (solicitor) (born 1948), one of the founders of the British Armed Forces Federation
- Douglas Young (cricketer) (1917–1995), English cricketer
- Douglas William Young (born 1950), Australian Catholic bishop
- Doug Young (politician) (born 1940), Canadian politician
- Doug Young (ice hockey) (1908–1990), Canadian ice hockey defenceman
- Doug Young (actor) (1919–2018), American voice actor
- Doug Young (boxer) (born 1961), British boxer
- Doug Young (sculptor) (born 1955), American sculptor
- Doug Young (powerlifter) (1964–2005), American powerlifter

== See also ==
- Dougie Young (1933–1991), singer and songwriter
- Douglas Y. Yongue (born 1937), North Carolina politician
