= Doug Young (sculptor) =

American sculptor

Doug Young (born April 9, 1955) is a sculptor of life-size bronze statues. He lives in South Carolina, United States.

Young studied under well-known South Carolina artists Emery Bopp, Darell Koons, and Carl Blair as well as the sculptor and restoration artist Adrianus Van Der Staak.

Young has lived in North or South Carolina since 1973 and moved to Greenville, South Carolina in 1992. His works include a life-size sculpture of ‘Shoeless’ Joe Jackson, which stands at Greenville's West End. The 'Shoeless' Joe Jackson statue was unveiled on July 13, 2002.

Young's other life size works include:

- Gethsemane a commissioned work for North Greenville University in Tigerville, South Carolina
- The Patriot for J. L. Mann High School
- Della Gillette commissioned by Pi Beta Phi to commemorate the Pi Beta Phi settlement school in Gatlinburg, Tennessee.
