= Elizabeth Cluer =

English printmaker (fl. 1713–31)

Elizabeth Cluer (née Dicey, later Cobb, fl. 1713–31) was an English printmaker and music publisher. She ran Widow Cluer's Printing Office at Bow Street from 1728–30 which printed music chapbooks as well as materials for shops such as bills and labels. Her marriage to John Cluer united the Dicey and Cluer printing families, which created a long-lasting printing dynasty.

Born Elizabeth Dicey, she was the sister of William Dicey from Northampton, who had a printing office in London from the 1710s. She married printmaker John Cluer, who ran the Bow Street office. When Cluer died in 1728, Elizabeth continued to run the press with 'the same Hands to act for her, as her late Husband employ'd', including the foreman, Thomas Cobb. Elizabeth married Thomas Cobb in 1731.

The printing office passed to William Dicey in 1736 when Elizabeth died or retired. It was then run by Dicey's son, Cluer Dicey.
