= George Salmon House =

- U.S. National Register of Historic Places
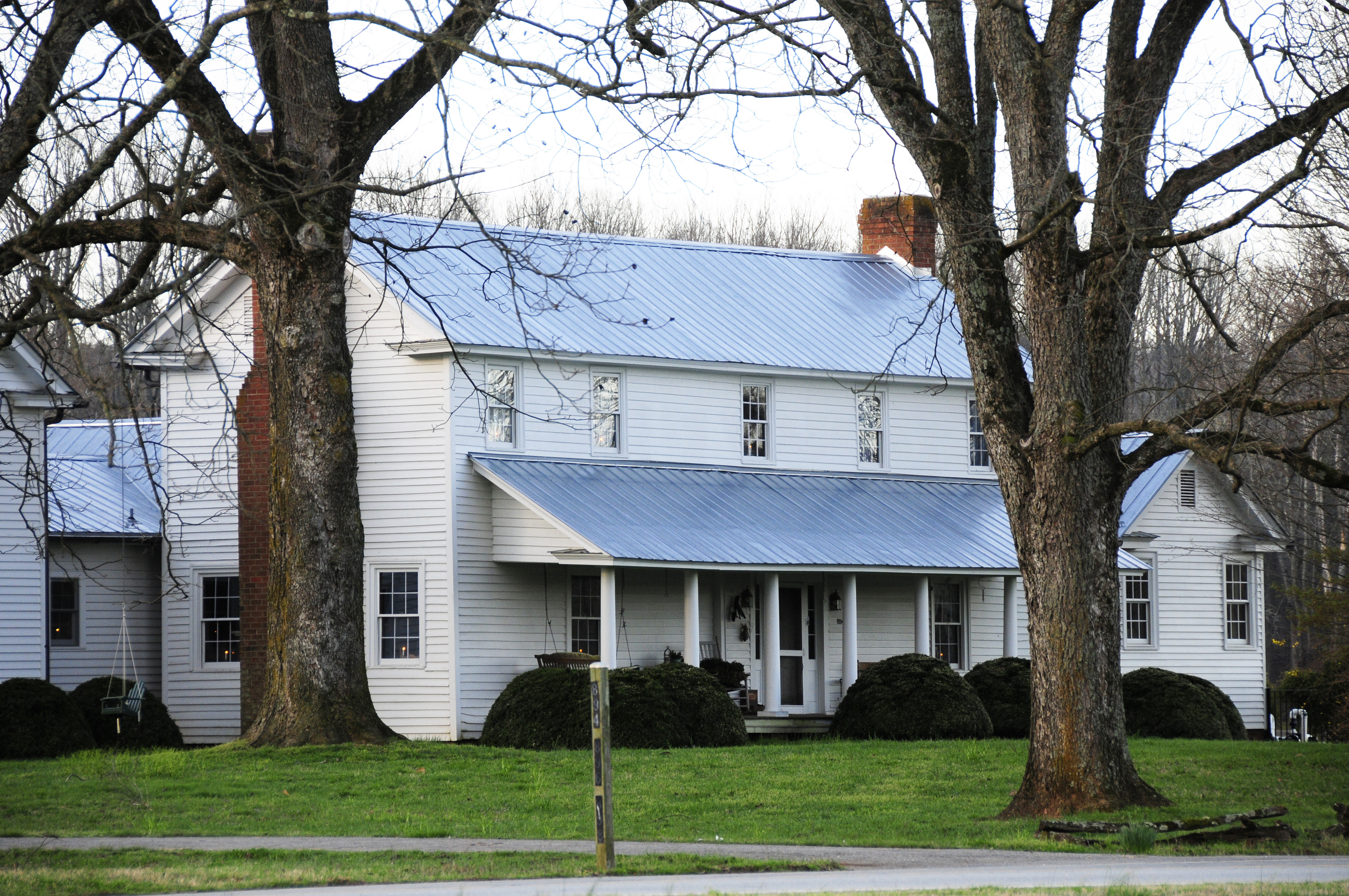
- George Salmon House, 2012

- Location within South Carolina Location within the United States
- Location: 894 Highway 414
- Nearest city: Travelers Rest, South Carolina
- Coordinates: 35.035079°N 82.458632°W
- Area: 2.6 acres (1.1 ha)
- Built: 1850
- NRHP reference No.: 87002520
- Added to NRHP: January 21, 1988

The George Salmon House, also known as the C. Douglas Wilson Farm, is located near Travelers Rest, South Carolina on SC Highway 414, off of US Highway 25.

A log house was initially built by George Salmon, a surveyor and one of the earliest settlers to the area, ca1784. Additions to the house transformed it into a two-story plantation plain style house on a brick foundation with a gable roof. In addition to the house, four other contributing properties are on the property including two multipurpose storage buildings, a chicken coop and a smokehouse.
