= Tom Corbin =

American politician

Member of the South Carolina Senate from the 5th district
- Incumbent
- Assumed office 2012
- Preceded by: Phillip Shoopman

Member of the South Carolina House of Representatives from the 17th district
- In office 2010–2012
- Preceded by: Harry Cato
- Succeeded by: Mike Burns

Personal details
- Born: January 11, 1965 (age 61) Greenville, South Carolina, US
- Party: Republican
- Spouse: Leann Robertson (m. 2012)
- Children: 2
- Education: Clemson University (B.S., 1987)
- Profession: Businessman

Thomas D. Corbin (born January 11, 1965) is an American businessman and politician. Since 2012, he has served as a member of the South Carolina Senate from the 5th District. Prior to that, he served for two years as a member in the South Carolina House of Representatives from the 17th District. He is a member of the Republican party.

== Early life and education ==
Tom Corbin was born on January 11, 1965, in Greenville, South Carolina to Barbee and Gail McCarty Corbin. He attended Clemson University, graduating in 1987 with a Bachelor of Science in ornamental horticulture.

== S.C. House of Representatives (2010-2012) ==
Corbin was first elected to the South Carolina House of Representatives in 2010 when he defeated Republican incumbent Harry Cato, who was seeking an eleventh term.

After serving his first term, Corbin ran for reelection in the House uncontested. After Corbin qualified for the general election, it was announced that incumbent State Sen. Phillip Shoopman would step down, leaving the seat open. As a result, Corbin ran concurrently in both races. After winning both races, Corbin resigned his House seat, triggering a special election that was won by Mike Burns.

== S.C. Senate ==
Since 2012, Corbin has represented South Carolina's 5th Senate district covering parts of Greenville and Spartanburg Counties. He was elected after Republican Phillip Shoopman announced he would not seek re-election.

Corbin formerly served on the Senate's general and judiciary committees, and currently serves on the finance; fish, game and forestry; labor, commerce and industry; medical affairs; and rules committees, as well as serving on the subcommittee on natural resources and the transportation and regulatory subcommittee.

Corbin is a conservative and a member of the Republican Party. As of 2018, he holds a 54% lifetime rating from the American Conservative Union. As is listed on his 2020 campaign website, Corbin is pro-life, and supports gun rights, lowering taxes, and cutting government spending.

== Political positions ==
=== Marijuana ===
Corbin has generally been against the legalization of medicinal marijuana, consistently voting against advancing the legislation out of sub-committees and committees he sits on. In a new round of legalization proposals in 2024, Corbin got the senate to adopt his amendment that would allow landlords and property owners to prohibit vaping cannabis products in their homes.

== Controversy ==
Corbin has been involved in controversy regarding comments he has made about women. In 2015, in a comment directed at South Carolina Sen. Katrina Shealy, the lone female senator at the time, Corbin said, "Well, you know God created man first. Then he took the rib out of man to make woman. And you know, a rib is a lesser cut of meat." Corbin later apologized, claiming that the comment was made "in jest", and that Shealy "chose to be offended and make a big deal out of all this". Although accepting his apology, Shealy later responded that "whether the person speaking them thinks they are in jest or not, these words are hurtful and disrespectful."

Corbin has also allegedly remarked that women "do not belong in the South Carolina General Assembly", but rather "at home baking cookies" or "barefoot and pregnant".

== Personal life ==
Corbin is married to Leann Robertson, with whom he has two children. The family currently resides in Travelers Rest. Corbin is a Baptist, and serves as a deacon and Sunday school teacher at Clearview Baptist Church. He has served as vice president and president of the Burban Creek Plantation, a hunting reserve located in Taylors, South Carolina.

== Electoral history ==
Year	Office	Type	Party	Main opponent	Party	Votes for Corbin				Result	Swing	Ref.
Year	Office	Type	Party	Main opponent	Party	Total	%	P.	±%	Result	Swing	Ref.
2010	S.C. Representative	Rep. primary	Republican	Harry Cato (Note: Incumbent seeking re-election.)	Republican	3,379	59.46%	1st	N/A	Won	N/A	
2010	S.C. Representative	General	Republican	Stephen Salter	Democratic	8,817	81.38%	1st	N/A	Won	Hold	
2012	S.C. Representative	General	Republican	Write-in	N/A	13,137	98.74%	1st	+17.36%	Won	Hold	
2012	S.C. Senator	Rep. primary	Republican	Amanda Tieder Somers	Republican	3,050	65.37%	1st	N/A	Won	N/A	
2012	S.C. Senator	General	Republican	Write-in	N/A	33,491	98.80%	1st	N/A	Won	Hold	
2016	S.C. Senator	Rep. primary	Republican	John B. White	Republican	5,442	51.54%	1st	-13.83%	Won	N/A	
2016	S.C. Senator	General	Republican	Write-in	N/A	39,364	98.89%	1st	+0.09%	Won	Hold	
2020	S.C. Senator	Rep. primary	Republican	Dave Edwards	Republican	9,254	70.37%	1st	+18.83%	Won	N/A	
2020	S.C. Senator	General	Republican	Michael McCord	Democratic	44,808	76.13%	1st	-22.76%	Won	Hold	

== Notes ==
South Carolina House of Representatives
Preceded by Harry Cato	Member of the South Carolina House of Representatives from the 17th district 2010–2012	Succeeded by Mike Burns
South Carolina Senate
Preceded by Phillip Shoopman	Member of the South Carolina Senate from the 5th district 2012–present	Incumbent
