= Harry Cato =

American politician

Harry Franklin Cato
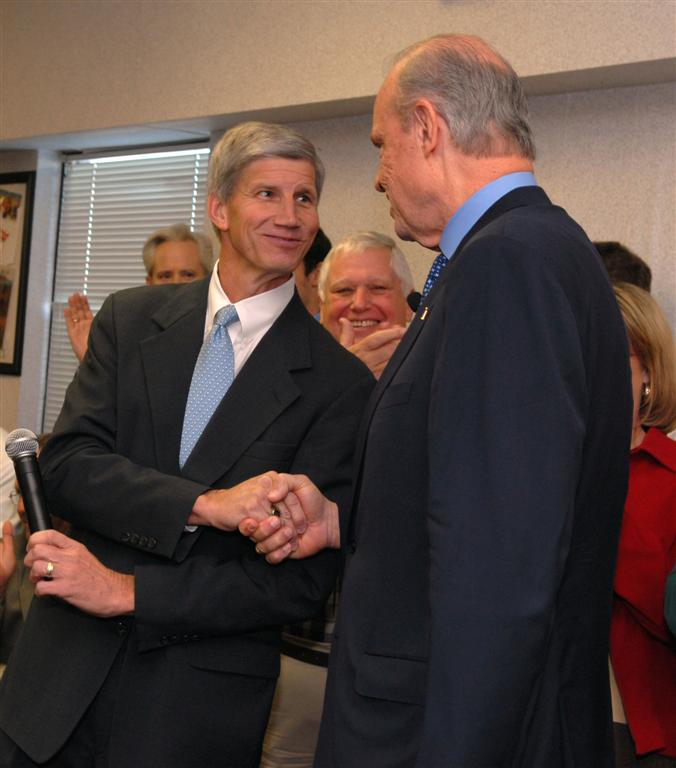
- Cato greeting Fred Thompson in 2007

Speaker pro tempore of the South Carolina House of Representatives
- In office December 2, 2008 – November 17, 2010
- Preceded by: W. Douglas Smith
- Succeeded by: Jay Lucas

Member of the South Carolina House of Representatives from the 17th district
- In office January 8, 1991 – January 11, 2011
- Preceded by: Dill Blackwell
- Succeeded by: Tom Corbin

Personal details
- Born: May 22, 1958 (age 68) Greenville, South Carolina
- Party: Republican
- Education: Clemson University (BS)
- Profession: Businessman

Harry Franklin Cato is a former Republican member of the South Carolina House of Representatives. From 1991 to 2010, he represented the state's 17th District. During his tenure, Cato served on the Rules Committee and was Chairman of the Labor, Commerce, and Industry Committee from 1994 until 2008. Cato also served as Speaker Pro Tempore of the South Carolina House of Representatives from 2008 to 2010. In the private sector, Cato is Manager of Cato Transportation Supply Inc.

Cato earned a Bachelor of Science from Clemson University in 1980 and now resides in Travelers Rest, SC.

== In the State House ==
During his 18 years in the House of Representatives, Cato has focused on commerce and business, even starting his own 527 Political Action Committee, the Carolina Commerce Fund (CCF). The CCF has raised over $100,000. As illustrated in the Committee's State Ethics Reports, a great deal of those funds go to other candidates and/or incumbents for political office.

The fiscally conservative 501(c)4 organization Club for Growth gave Cato a grade of "D−" for the 2007–08 Legislative session (the last session for which the group has records). Project Vote Smart has extensive information on Cato's voting record and ratings from other organizations.

He lost the Republican nomination in 2010 to Tom Corbin.

== Controversial vote ==
In filling a vacancy on the South Carolina Supreme Court in 2007, Representative Cato supported and voted for State Appeals Court Judge Don Beatty (noted in the S.C. Club for Growth Scorecard above). While most conservative groups and members of the South Carolina General Assembly opposed Beatty's confirmation to the Supreme Court, Cato helped forge alliances with the Black Caucus in support of Beatty.

Much of the conservative opposition to Beatty's confirmation was predicated on some of his votes as a legislator from 1991 to 1995. One of the most controversial votes was in opposition to a bill that would have required physicians to present literature on abortion alternatives to patients. Oran Smith, President of Palmetto Family Council, said of Beatty's vote on the abortion measure: "Only the most extreme liberals in the General Assembly voted against that."
