= John H. Goodwin House =

Historic house in South Carolina, United States

- U.S. National Register of Historic Places
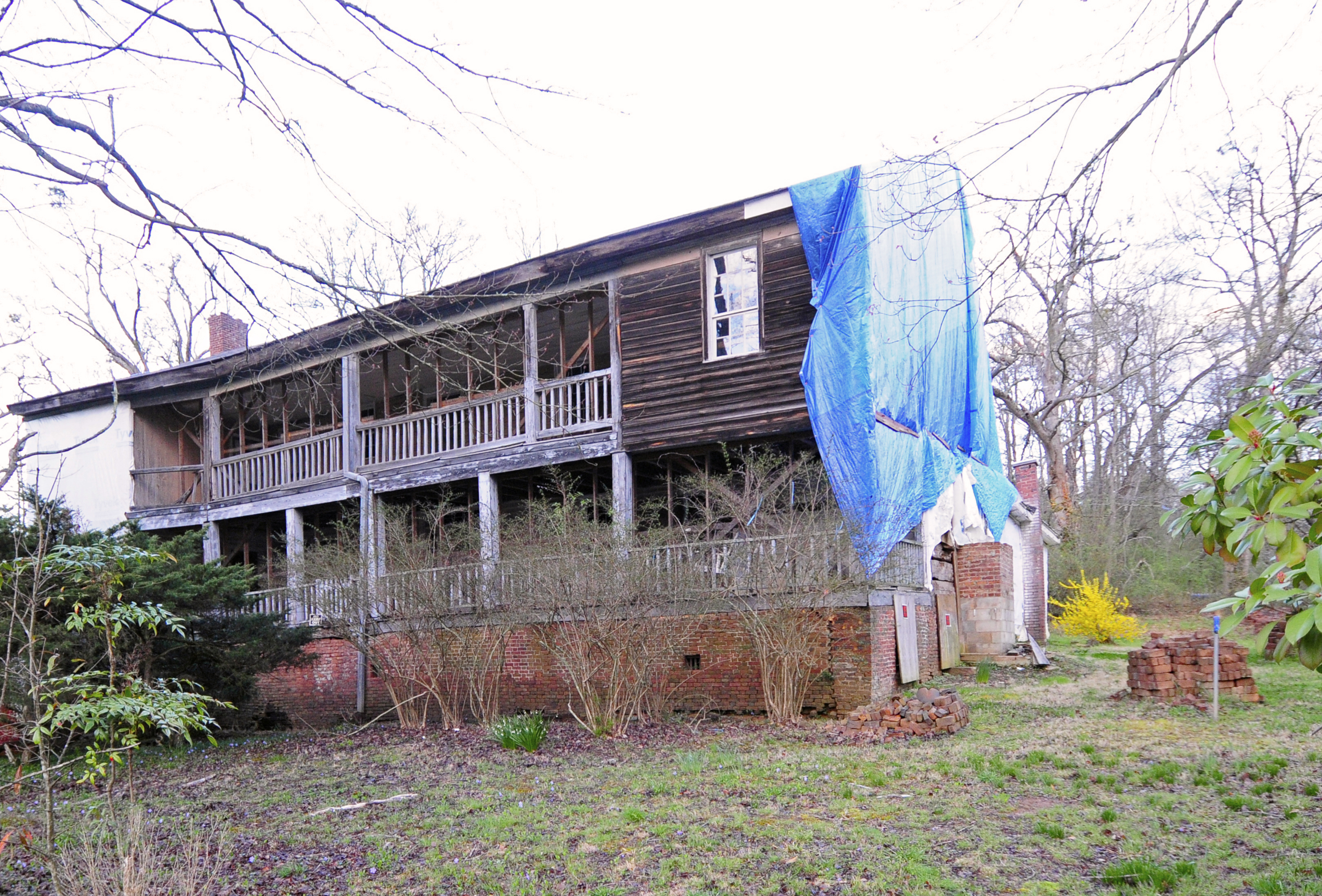
- The John Goodwin House in 2012

- Location within South Carolina Location within the United States
- Location: 3782 Highway 11
- Nearest city: Travelers Rest, South Carolina
- Coordinates: 35.088695°N 82.451817°W
- Area: 0.8 acres (0.32 ha)
- Built: 1840
- NRHP reference No.: 83002197
- Added to NRHP: September 8, 1983

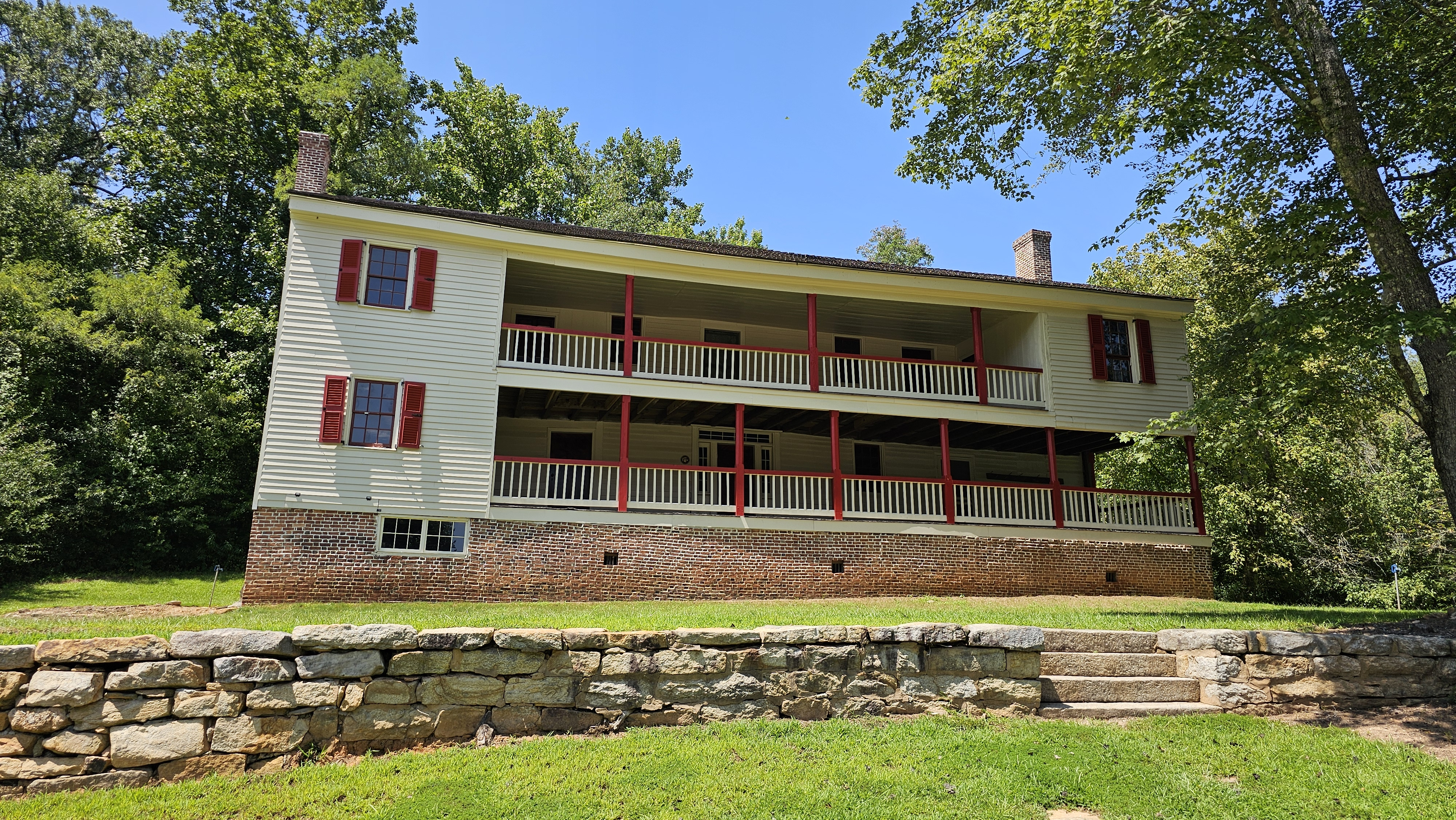
John Goodwin House as seen on August 18, 2024, after a complete restoration.

The John H. Goodwin House, also known as the Blythe-Goodwin-Hagood House, is a historic structure located on South Carolina Highway 11 in Greenville County near Travelers Rest, South Carolina. The two-story farmhouse and the one-story store building located in front of the house are listed on the National Register of Historic Places.

== House ==
The house was built in stages, with the earliest log building portion constructed ca1790 by Robert Cooke. A two-story addition was completed ca1840 which included an entrance hallway. A detached kitchen with a stone chimney was built behind the house at the same time. Additional later alterations created a new room on the northeast side the house by enclosing a porch and connection the kitchen to the main house.

From ca1840 to 1899, the house served as a midway stage stop for travelers on the road between Greenville and Asheville, North Carolina.

== Store ==
The one-story, frame store building in the Greek Revival style was constructed ca1870 by John H. Goodwin. It was built on an open pier foundation with weatherboard siding and a gabled roof. It was used as a post office and trading post.

== Preservation ==
In 2005, the Greenville Chapter of the non-profit Cherokee Foothills National Scenic Byway Association purchased 11 acres which included the house and store. A conservation easement was created to protect the property from new development and a restoration of the store was undertaken. In 2011, the Highway 11 Welcome Center was opened up in the restored store. The association has completed repairs on the roof and foundation of the house and plans to complete further restoration in the future. the visitor center has never been opened and the house restoration never finished
