= Mike Burns (South Carolina politician) =

American politician (born 1952)

Member of the South Carolina House of Representatives from the 17th district
- Incumbent
- Assumed office 2013
- Preceded by: Tom Corbin

Personal details
- Born: June 9, 1952 (age 74) Columbia, South Carolina, U.S.
- Party: Republican

James Mikell "Mike" Burns (born June 9, 1952) is an American politician. He is a member of the South Carolina House of Representatives from the 17th District, serving since 2013. He is a member of the Republican party.

== Politics ==
Burns is a member of the South Carolina Freedom Caucus. He also serves on the House Agriculture, Natural Resources & Environmental Affairs and the Regulations and Administrative Procedures Committees.

On December 13, 2017, Burns and fellow South Carolina representative Bill Chumley proposed building a monument to South Carolina's black Confederate soldiers, although the historical record shows that no such soldiers existed.

In the 2023-2024 and 2025-2026 sessions of the South Carolina House of Representatives, Burns has filed bills to ban all plant and animal based foods from being "Certified SC Grown" food. The bills put forward would all ban foods that contain mRNA from being considered "Certified SC Grown" food.
