= Travelers Rest, South Carolina =

- City
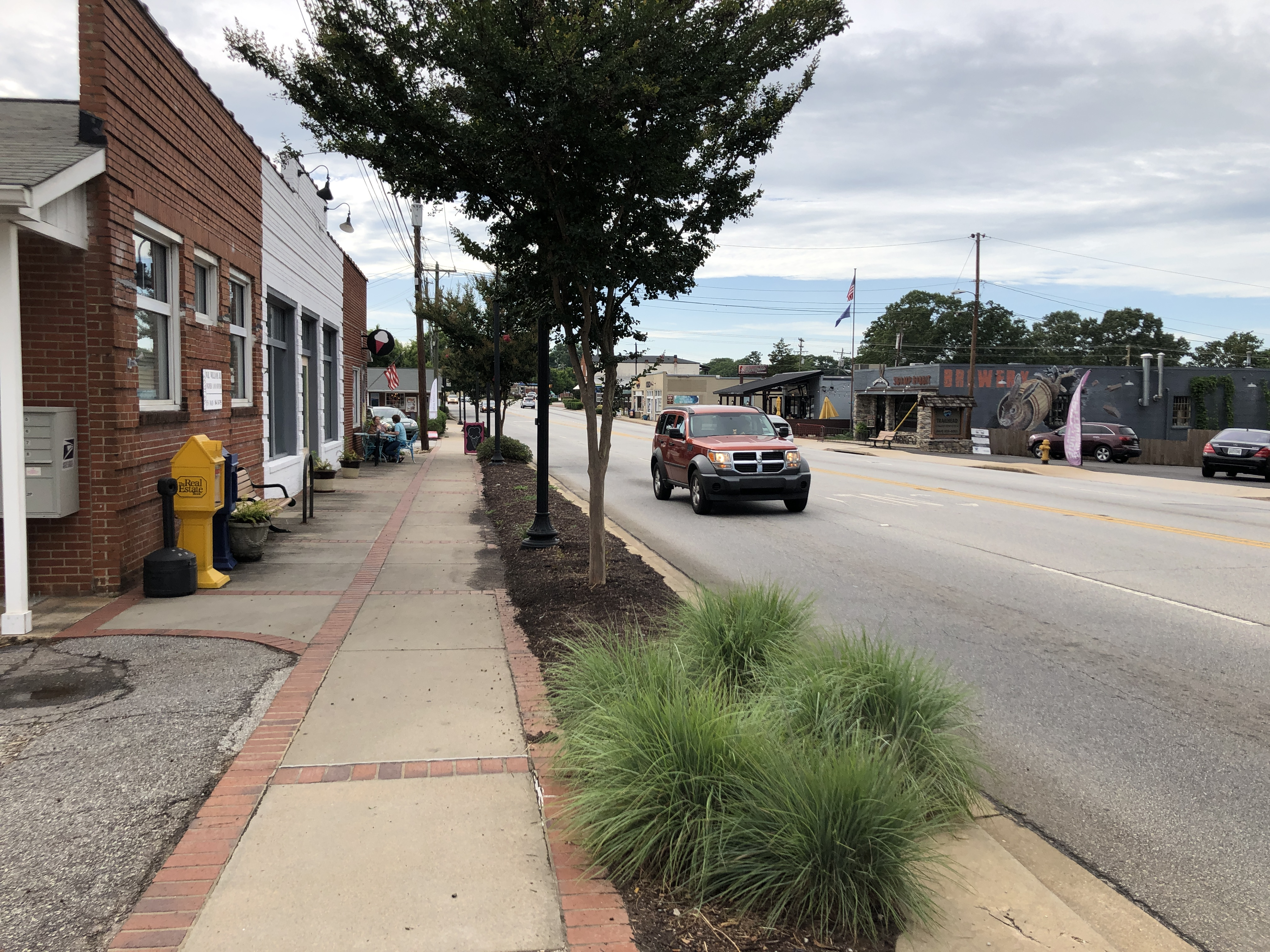
- U.S. Route 276 in Travelers Rest

- Nicknames: TR, Gateway to the Foothills
- Motto: "Get in Your Element"
- Interactive map of Travelers Rest, South Carolina
- Location within South Carolina Location within the United States
- Coordinates: 34°57′30″N 82°26′29″W
- Country: United States
- State: South Carolina
- County: Greenville
- Incorporated: 1959

Government
  - Type: Council
  - Mayor: Brandy Amidon
  - City Administrator: Shannon Herman

Area
  - Total: 6.33 sq mi (16.40 km^{2})
  - Land: 6.24 sq mi (16.16 km^{2})
  - Water: 0.093 sq mi (0.24 km^{2})
- Elevation: 1,116 ft (340 m)

Population (2020)
  - Total: 7,788
  - Density: 1,247.9/sq mi (481.82/km^{2})
- Time zone: UTC−5 (Eastern (EST))
  - Summer (DST): UTC−4 (EDT)
- ZIP Code: 29690
- Area codes: 864, 821
- FIPS code: 45-72430
- GNIS feature ID: 2405599
- Website: travelersrestsc.com

Travelers Rest is a city in Greenville County, South Carolina, United States. Its population was 7,788 at the 2020 census. The city is located 10 miles (16 km) north of Greenville and around 20 miles (32 km) south of the North Carolina border, and is part of Upstate South Carolina.

Travelers Rest was founded by J.W. Donaldson, founder of a bloodstock cattle empire. Initially built as a reprieve for his oxen and coach herd, the family eventually did yoke and axle repair for settlers headed out on the Oregon Trail. Later, the Dry Goods Warehouse became the start to the Swamp Rabbit Trail. The campus of Furman University, a private liberal arts university, was annexed into the city limits of Travelers Rest in 2018.

== History ==
In 1794, the South Carolina General Assembly appropriated $2,000 to construct a wagon road from Greenville north into the Blue Ridge Mountains, through Asheville, North Carolina, and ending in East Tennessee. This road, once fully completed in the mid-1850's, was full of wagon traffic. For those going north into the mountains from the coast through Greenville, Travelers Rest was the first well-equipped stop to prepare for the several thousand-foot climb ahead of them. Travelers Rest was most recently incorporated as a city in 1959, although there was an 1891 incorporation that expired. While unincorporated, most of the area was known as Bates Township during the 19th and early 20th centuries.

The John H. Goodwin House and George Salmon House are listed on the National Register of Historic Places. American Revolutionary heroine Dicey Langston's home, now site of a historical marker, is located just north of the city proper.

== Geography ==
As of the 2010 census, the city had a total area of 4.6 square miles (11.8 km^{2}), of which 0.02 square miles (0.06 km^{2}), or 0.54%, were water.

=== Climate ===
Climate data for Travelers Rest, SC
Month	Jan	Feb	Mar	Apr	May	Jun	Jul	Aug	Sep	Oct	Nov	Dec	Year
Mean daily maximum °F (°C)	51.1 (10.6)	55.0 (12.8)	62.8 (17.1)	72.3 (22.4)	79.9 (26.6)	85.6 (29.8)	88.3 (31.3)	87.4 (30.8)	81.5 (27.5)	72.3 (22.4)	62.4 (16.9)	53.1 (11.7)	71.0 (21.7)
Daily mean °F (°C)	40.5 (4.7)	43.5 (6.4)	50.7 (10.4)	59.4 (15.2)	67.6 (19.8)	74.1 (23.4)	77.4 (25.2)	76.6 (24.8)	70.5 (21.4)	59.9 (15.5)	50.5 (10.3)	42.6 (5.9)	59.4 (15.3)
Mean daily minimum °F (°C)	30.0 (−1.1)	32.0 (0.0)	38.7 (3.7)	46.4 (8.0)	55.4 (13.0)	62.8 (17.1)	66.6 (19.2)	65.8 (18.8)	59.7 (15.4)	47.7 (8.7)	38.8 (3.8)	32.4 (0.2)	48.0 (8.9)

== Demographics ==
Historical population
Census	Pop.	Note	%±
1960	1,973		—
1970	2,241		13.6%
1980	3,017		34.6%
1990	3,069		1.7%
2000	4,099		33.6%
2010	4,576		11.6%
2020	7,788		70.2%
2025 (est.)	9,135	▲	17.3%
U.S. Decennial Census

=== 2020 census ===
As of the 2020 census, Travelers Rest had a population of 7,788, a median age of 22.9 years, 17.5% of residents under the age of 18, 15.5% of residents 65 years of age or older, 76.8 males for every 100 females, and 72.0 males for every 100 females age 18 and over.

Racial composition as of the 2020 census
Race	Number	Percent
White	6,129	78.7%
Black or African American	888	11.4%
American Indian and Alaska Native	26	0.3%
Asian	151	1.9%
Native Hawaiian and Other Pacific Islander	5	0.1%
Some other race	154	2.0%
Two or more races	435	5.6%
Hispanic or Latino (of any race)	391	5.0%

There were 2,257 households in Travelers Rest, of which 32.9% had children under the age of 18 living in them. Of all households, 44.4% were married-couple households, 14.8% were households with a male householder and no spouse or partner present, 35.9% were households with a female householder and no spouse or partner present, and 1,171 were families. About 31.6% of all households were made up of individuals and 17.5% had someone living alone who was 65 years of age or older.

There were 2,567 housing units, of which 12.1% were vacant. The homeowner vacancy rate was 1.5% and the rental vacancy rate was 8.7%.

98.1% of residents lived in urban areas, while 1.9% lived in rural areas.

=== 2000 census ===
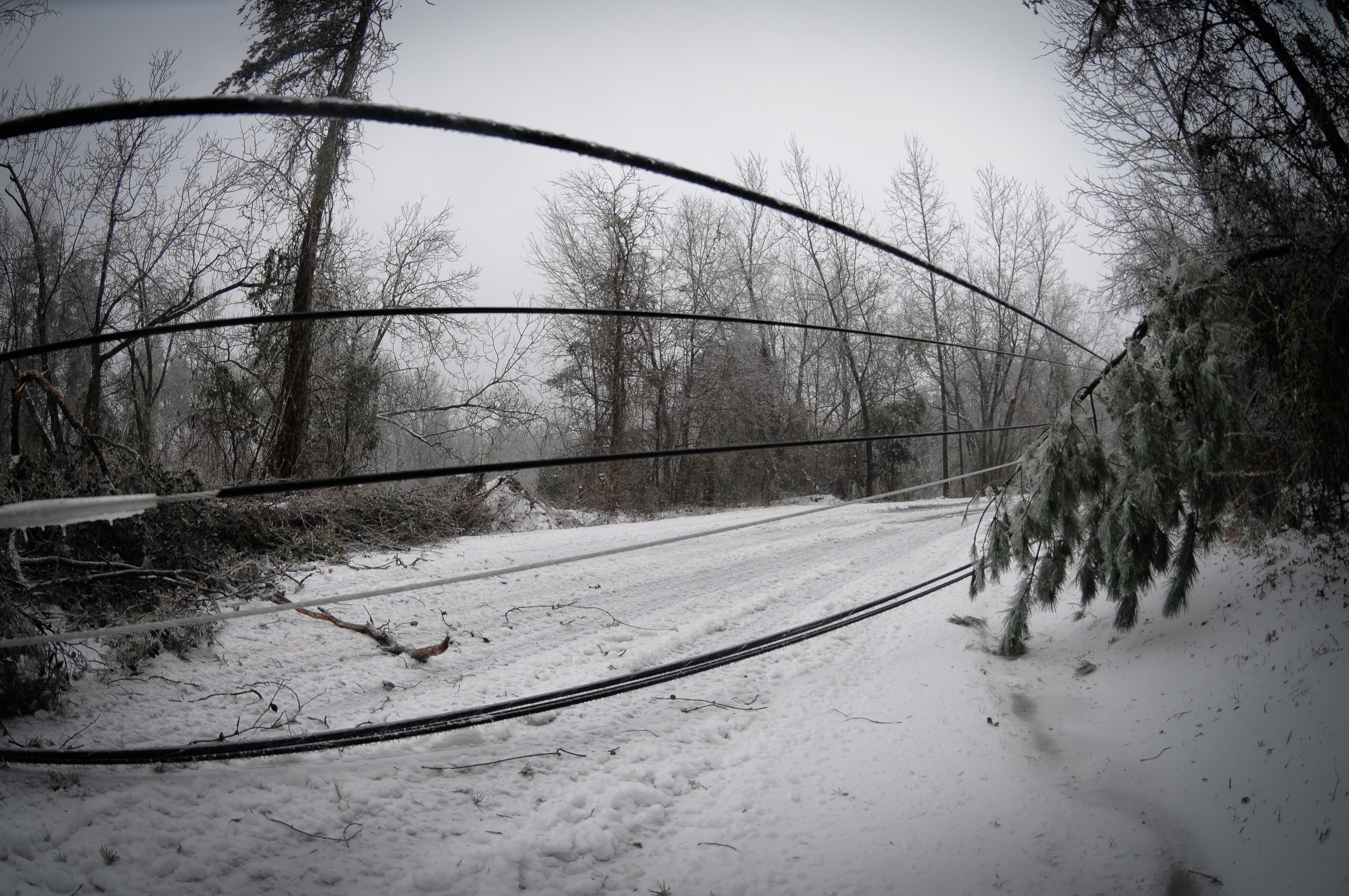
A 2016 snow and ice storm in Travelers Rest

As of the census of 2000, there were 4,099 people, 1,563 households, and 1,137 families residing in the city. The population density was 930.8 inhabitants per square mile (359.4/km^{2}). There were 1,729 housing units at an average density of 392.6 per square mile (151.6/km^{2}). The racial makeup of the city was 77.36% White, 18.30% African American, 0.27% Native American, 1.22% Asian, 1.68% from other races, and 1.17% from two or more races. 4.22% of the population were of Hispanic or Latino ethnicity.

There were 1,563 households, out of which 38.0% had children under the age of 18 living with them, 49.6% were married couples living together, 18.6% had a female householder with no husband present, and 27.2% were non-families. 22.5% of all households were made up of individuals, and 8.8% had someone living alone who was 65 years of age or older. The average household size was 2.60 and the average family size was 3.04.

In the city, the population was spread out, with 29.9% under the age of 18, 9.6% from 18 to 24, 29.4% from 25 to 44, 20.3% from 45 to 64, and 10.7% who were 65 years of age or older. The median age was 32 years. For every 100 females, there were 93.1 males. For every 100 females age 18 and over, there were 86.7 males.

The median income for a household in the city was $34,917, and the median income for a family was $38,229. Males had a median income of $30,377 versus $22,634 for females. The per capita income for the city was $15,704. About 12.2% of families and 15.8% of the population were below the poverty line, including 23.9% of those under age 18 and 11.8% of those age 65 or over.

== Education ==
Furman University, just south of Travelers Rest proper, was annexed into the city but retains Greenville as its designated address. The city is also the home of the Travelers Rest High School Devildogs. Travelers Rest has a public library, a branch of the Greenville County Library System.

== Transportation ==
U.S. Route 276 northbound connects downtown Greenville with the city and becomes Travelers Rest's Main Street before heading northwest past Caesar's Head State Park, and into North Carolina to Brevard, North Carolina. U.S. Route 25 northbound enters the city from West Greenville, then turns north into the Blue Ridge Mountains, connecting to Asheville, North Carolina, about 54 miles (87 km) away.

== Notable people ==
- Matt Baumgardner, contemporary artist
- Harry Cato, member of the South Carolina House of Representatives
- Tom Corbin, member of the South Carolina Senate
- Pamela Evette, 93rd lieutenant governor of South Carolina
- Will Ford, professional football running back
- George Hincapie, racing cyclist
- Red Howell, Major League Baseball player
- Bob Inglis, member of the U.S. House of Representatives
- Dicey Langston, patriot
- Esther Reed, criminal known for attending universities using stolen identities
- Aaron Tippin, country music singer, songwriter and record producer
- John B. Watson, psychologist
