= Cluer Dicey =

English printer and newspaper proprietor (1715–1775)

- Born: 28 January 1715; London
- Died: 3 October 1775 (aged 60); Claybrooke Parva
- Occupations: Vendor of Patent medicines, newspaper proprietor, publisher, printer, printseller.
- Spouse: Mary/Maria Nutshawe
- Children: William, b & d. 1739; Charlotte, b. 1740; Thomas, b. 1742, Sarah Ann b. 1746, Elizabeth (dates not known)
- Parent(s): William Dicey and Mary, nee Atkins

Cluer Dicey (28 January 1715 – 3 October 1775) was an English newspaper proprietor, publisher of street literature, printseller and patent medicine seller, in London and later in Northampton. He was also proprietor of the Northampton Mercury newspaper from 1756 until his death in October 1775. Likewise he inherited and developed a huge distribution network in England for patent medicines.

== Family ==
Cluer was born 28 January 1715 at London, the son of William Dicey (1690–1756) and Mary his wife (née Atkins). He was named after his uncle, John Cluer, a London printer and music publisher. He married Mary [sometimes given as Maria] Nutshawe 7 October 1738. They had two sons, William (who died in infancy 1739) and Thomas, b. 1742. They also had three daughters, Charlotte, b. 1740; Sarah Ann b. 1746, and Elizabeth (dates not known). Maria died 3 February 1761, at Northampton.

== Businesses ==
In 1732 William Dicey attempted to buy the Stamford Mercury newspaper for his son to manage, following the death of its printer William Thompson, but later pulled out of the deal. The following year Cluer was formally apprenticed to William as a member of the London Leathersellers Company in what may have been a means of enabling him to trade in London.

=== William Dicey & Co, ===
In 1736 William Dicey took over the London printing, publishing and medicine selling business formerly operated by John and Elizabeth Cluer, and sent his son to operate it whilst he managed the business in Northampton. Following Cluer's grant of freedom of the Leathersellers Company on 12 September 1739 the business became William and Cluer Dicey. In March 1738 William and Cluer were sued in the Court of Chancery by the London Stationers Company for breaching their monopoly of 'Psalters, Primmers, Almanacs, Prognostications and Predictions. The outcome of this case is not known but it did not hinder the growth of the business in London.

=== William & Cluer Dicey ===
During the 1740s and early 1750s Cluer Dicey expanded the London operation to become the principal British publishers of street literature (broadside ballads, chapbooks, slip songs). The publishing side of the partnership took on a new junior partner, Richard Marshall, with a 25% interest in 1753 and opened a second printing shop in Aldermary Churchyard in 1754. William and Cluer also published a catalogue c.1754. William and Cluer also became important publishers of popular prints, concentrating on the lower end of the market, both commissioning new plates and buying up and republishing old ones.

However, Cluer's main interests were in developing the sales of patent medicines which were operated as a separate business. His father owned a third share in the formula for Dr Bateman's Pectoral Drops. The company later added more medicines, including Greenough's Tincture, Radcliffe's Purging Elixir, and one of the several versions of Daffy's Elixir. The Dicey family, would later develop this business to become one of the two most significant patent medicine businesses in Britain.

=== Cluer Dicey & Co. ===
William Dicey died 2 November 1756, leaving Cluer his London business interests, subject to his paying £1500 in annuities to his sisters Ann, Mary and Charlotte, and £500 to his brother Robert. The London business then became Cluer Dicey & Co. The Northampton business was bought by Robert with his legacy, but he died in 1757 and it reverted to Cluer. Thereafter he lived at Northampton. Dicey closed the printing office in Bow Churchyard in 1763, concentrating production in Aldermary Churchyard. Thereafter the premises in Bow Churchyard were used for his expanding medicine distribution business.

=== Cluer Dicey & Richard Marshall ===
In 1764 William Dicey's daughters sued their elder brother over the non-payment of their annuities. The settlement of this case corresponded with Richard Marshall acquiring a partnership in the London publishing business. Dicey and Marshall published a new catalogue in 1764. At the same time, the Dicey family retained sole control of the medicinal side of the business On 27 March 1770 a warrant was issued in the Court of Common Pleas against Cluer Dicey and Richard Marshall, complaining that they had infringed the copyright of Robert Sayer: this is the last known reference to the partnership. By August 1770 Marshall was publishing prints in his own from Aldermary Churchyard. Cluer's will, drawn up in 1772 makes it clear that he no longer had any interest in the Aldermary publishing business, Cluer Dicey retired to his estate at Little Claybrook, Leicestershire, whilst his son Thomas ran the medicinal business in London. The Northampton publishing business and newspaper continued to be run in his name until 1775.

== Retirement and death ==
In 1767 he purchased Claybrooke Hall, Leicestershire. He died 3 October 1775 (aged 60) at Little Claybrooke. His tomb, at St. Peter's Church, contains lines written by Hannah More.

== Bibliography ==
- Dianne Dugaw, ‘The Popular Marketing of ‘Old Ballads’: the Ballad Revival and Eighteenth-Century Antiquarianism Reconsidered’, Eighteenth Century Studies 21, (1987): pp. 71–90,
- Ian Jackson, ‘Print in Provincial England: Reading and Northampton, 1720-1800’ (unpublished doctoral thesis, University of Oxford (2002).
- Alan Mackintosh, The Patent Medicines Industry in Georgian England: Constructing the Market by the Potency of Print (2018).
- Victor Neuburg, ‘The Diceys and the Chapbook Trade’, The Library, xxiv, (1969), 219–231.
- Victor Neuburg, Chapbooks, 2nd edn (London: Woburn Press, 1972), p. 49.
- David Stoker, 'Another look at the Dicey-Marshall publications 1736-1806', The Library: Transactions of the Bibliographical Society, 7th series, XV, (2014), 111–157.
