= Richard Reece (physician) =

English physician

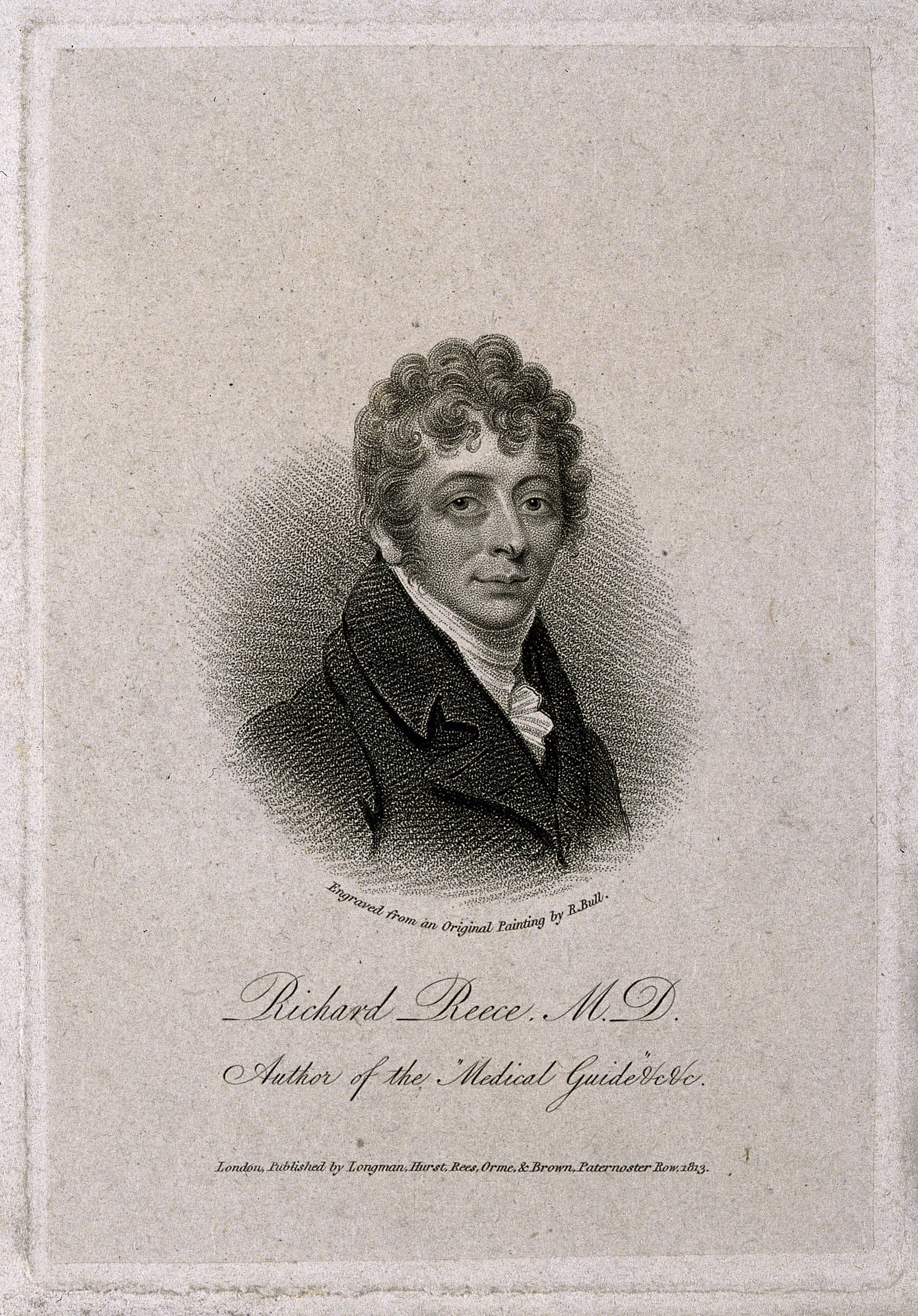
- Born: 1775
- Died: 26 September 1831 (aged 55–56)
- Occupation: Physician

Richard Reece (1775 – 26 September 1831) was an English physician.

== Biography ==
Reece was born in 1775. He was the third and youngest son of William Reece (died 1781), vicar of Bosbury, rector of Coddington, and curate of Colwall in Herefordshire, by Elizabeth Anna Mackafee, lady of the manor of Battleborough, Somerset. Early devoting himself to the profession of medicine, Richard was at the age of twenty resident surgeon at the Hereford Infirmary. He became a member of the Royal College of Surgeons of England in 1796, and from 1797 to 1808 he practised in Chepstow and Cardiff. The Royal Humane Society in 1799 bestowed its silver medal upon him ‘for his medical services in the cause of humanity vitam ob restitutam’ (sic), and he afterwards entered its service as a medical assistant. He was living in London in 1812, and he subsequently graduated M.D., but it is not known from what university. He secured considerable practice in London, and was consulted by Joanna Southcott, who was then aged 64, as to the possibility of her supernatural pregnancy. He seems to have given a guarded diagnosis, which he had an opportunity of converting into a certain one, for he assisted at her autopsy when she died on 27 December 1814.

Reece led an active life, and, in addition to his practice, interested himself in therapeutic and chemical pursuits at a time when these studies were but little considered. His knowledge of the medicinal properties of plants enabled him to introduce several new drugs into general use. He died on 26 September 1831, and is buried in St. George's burial-ground, Bayswater Road, London. He married Kitty Blackborow, a daughter of Judge Blackborow.

A miniature in oils, by R. Bull, belonged to Dr. A. J. Richardson of West Brighton. It was engraved.

== Publications ==
- ‘The Medical Guide, for the use of the Clergy, Heads of Families, and Practitioners in Medicine and Surgery,’ &c., London, 8vo; 1st ed. 1802, 17th ed. 1850; an attempt to place before the public the rational treatment of disease when far removed from skilled assistance, and the steps to be taken in cases of accidents, emergency, and sudden illness.
- ‘Observations on the Anti-Phthisical Properties of Lichen Islandicus, or Iceland Moss,’ London, 8vo, 1803.
- ‘Practical Observations on Radix Rhataniæ,’ London, 8vo, 1808.
- ‘A Practical Dictionary of Domestic Medicine,’ &c., London, 8vo, 1808.
- ‘Letters addressed to Mic. G. Prendergast on the present State of Medicine in great Britain,’ &c., London, 8vo, 1810.
- ‘The Reecean Pandect of Medicine,’ &c., London, royal 8vo, 1812.
- ‘The Chemical Guide,’ London, 8vo, 1814.
- ‘Statement of the last Illness and Death of Mrs. [Joanna] Southcott, with the Appearances on Dissection,’ &c., 8vo, London, 1815.
- ‘A Practical Treatise on the Beneficial Effect of the Gratiola Officinalis in Nervous and Organic Diseases of the Lungs,’ &c., London, 8vo, 1818.
- ‘A Practical Treatise on Diseases of the Genital System, the Rectum … with an Account of the Diosma Crenata or Buchu Leaves,’ &c., London, 8vo, 1825.
- ‘A Practical Dissertation on the Means of obviating and treating the Varieties of Costiveness,’ &c., London, 8vo, 1826; 2nd edit. 1827.
- ‘The Lady's Medical Guide,’ &c., 16mo, 1833.
- ‘A Practical Treatise on the Anti-Asthmatic Properties of the Bladder-podded Lobelia … to which is added an Account of the Chirayito Herb,’ London; 2nd edit. 1830. Reece also edited the ‘Monthly Gazette of Practical Medicine,’ 1816–31, and the ‘Medical Annual.’
