= Dicey Langston =

American patriot spy (1766–1837)

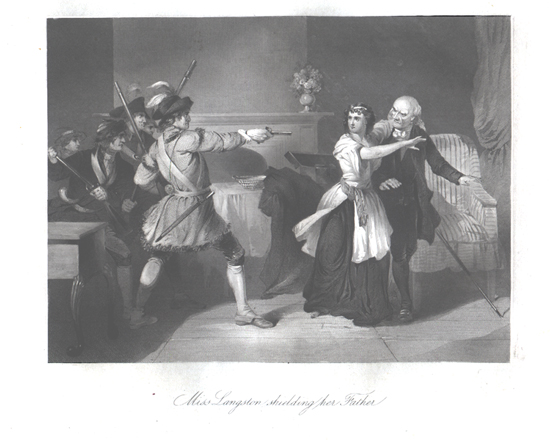
- An engraving of Dicey Langston protecting her father from Loyalists
- Born: Laodicea Langston; 14 May 1766; South Carolina
- Died: 18 May 1837, Aged 71

Laodicea Langston (14 May 1766 – 23 May 1837), also known by the nickname Dicey, was a patriot. Her acts of bravery during the period have led to her being regarded as a heroine.

During the Revolutionary War, Dicey spied on the Loyalists to assist the defense of her community of patriots. At 15, she heard that the Loyalist group 'Bloody Scouts' were preparing to attack the Elder Settlement at Little Eden, South Carolina. She traveled five miles on foot to deliver this message to her brother at the site by crossing the swollen Tyger River, (Note: This is also reported as the Enoree) for the community to be evacuated. Dicey also defended her disabled father, Solomon Langston, when their home was attacked by the group on another occasion, by standing between their weapons and her father. Admiring her bravery, they did not harm her or her father. There are many tales of her challenging groups of Loyalists and defiantly refusing to answer their questions, reportedly saying: "Shoot me if you dare. I will not tell you".

In 1783 she married Thomas Springfield; they had reportedly met years earlier when he had collected a musket from Dicey's home and refused to sign for it. She had then turned the gun on him and dared him to take it without signing.

== Legacy ==
Dicey died on the 18th of May 1837, aged 71 and was praised for her "daring deeds on behalf of her suffering country and friends" A children's book "Rebel with a Cause: The Daring Adventure of Dicey Langston, Girl Spy of the American Revolution" tells the tales of Dicey. A marker has been placed at the site of Dicey's home on Tigerville Road, Travelers Rest, South Carolina.
