= William Dicey =

English newspaper proprietor, publisher, printseller and patent medicine seller

- Born: 25 December 1690; Basingstoke
- Died: November 1756 (aged 65); Northampton
- Occupations: Vendor of Patent medicines, newspaper proprietor, publisher, printer, printseller.
- Spouse: Mary Atkins
- Children: Cluer, b. 1715; William, b. 1719; Robert, b. 1720, Edward b. 1721, Ann, Mary and Charlotte
- Parent(s): Thomas Dicey and Elizabeth, nee Cluer

William Dicey (1690-1756) was an English newspaper proprietor, publisher of street literature, printseller and patent medicine seller, in Northampton and later in London. He was also the co-founder and proprietor of the Northampton Mercury newspaper from its establishment in 1720 until his death in November 1756. He also built up a huge distribution network in England for patent medicines.

== Family ==
William was born 25 December 1690 at Basingstoke, the son of Thomas Dicey (d. 1705), a tailor and Elizabeth his wife (nee Cluer). He was apprenticed to John Sewers, of the London Leathersellers Company 17 April 1711. John Cluer, a London printer and music publisher, at the sign of the Maidenhead in Bow Churchyard married William’s sister, Elizabeth, in 1713 and at about the same time William was ‘turned over’ to work for his brother-in-law. William eventually became a freeman of the Leathersellers Company 7 August 1721, although he seems never to have practiced this trade. By this time, he was an established provincial printer and newspaper proprietor.

William married Mary Atkins at some time before April 1719. They had four sons: Cluer, who was born 28 January 1714/5; William, christened at St Mary Le Bow, in April 1719; Robert, born 16 January 1720, and Edward born 8 February 1721. They also had three daughters: Ann, Mary and Charlotte (dates of birth not known).

== Provincial businesses ==
By October 1719, Dicey was working in St. Ives, Huntingdonshire, where he founded the ‘St. Ives Mercury’, (the third newspaper to be printed in the town, although the first had gone out of business by this time). He also printed two editions of an anti-Jacobite pamphlet, ‘A consolatory epistle to the jacks of Great Britain’ - one of which had a ‘misleading’ London imprint. However, before April 1720 he had formed a partnership with Robert Raikes, his rival printer in St Ives, and both men had moved their new business to Northampton. They occupied premises ‘next to the George Inn, opposite All Saints Church’, where they founded the Northampton Mercury, and purchased their freedom in May 1720. Northampton proved to be ideally suited for a new provincial newspaper trade and the venture prospered.

In April 1722 Raikes and Dicey established a second provincial newspaper, the Gloucester Journal which also prospered. Before April 1725 the two men dissolved their partnership. Dicey retained the business in Northampton and Raikes took over that in Gloucester. The Northampton business continued to do well serving a wide geographical area in the English Midlands. (Bergel p. 149-162). Dicey purchased larger premises at 11 The Parade, Market Hill in 1728, where the newspaper continued to be printed until the end of the century.

Following the publication of the three volumes of ‘A Collection of Old Ballads,’ by James Roberts between 1723 and 1725. Dicey copied the contents: 'texts, headnotes, illustrations and all’, in a series of broadside ballads, sold by hawkers and pedlars throughout the countryside. From this, he expanded the publishing business to include publishing other categories of Street literature.

Raikes and Dicey started advertising a new patent medicine, Dr Bateman's Pectoral Drops, devised by Benjamin Okell, in 1720. Okell patented the medicine in 1723 and by 1726, Raikes, Dicey and John Cluer had bought shares and begun trading from Cluer’s premises in Bow Churchyard.

== London businesses ==
In 1736, William took over the printing and publishing, and medicine business in Bow Churchyard, formerly operated by his brother-in-law, John Cluer. For a few years the business was operated in William’s name alone, although his eldest son, Cluer Dicey was responsible for its day to day operation. From 1740, they were in partnership.

In March 1738 William and Cluer were sued in the Court of Chancery by the London Stationers Company for breaching their monopoly of 'Psalters, Primmers, Almanacs, Prognostications and Predictions. The outcome of this case is not known but it did not hinder the growth of the business in London.

During the 1740s and early 1750s William and Cluer Dicey expanded their London operation in three respects:

- They became the principal British publishers of street literature (broadside ballads, chapbooks, slip songs), and published a catalogue c.1754. To this end they acquired a new junior partner, Richard Marshall, in 1753 and opened a second printing shop in Aldermary Churchyard in 1754.
- William and Cluer became important publishers of popular prints, concentrating on the lower end of the market, both commissioning new plates and buying up and republishing old ones.
- They added more medicines, including Greenough’s Tincture, Radcliffe’s Purging Elixir, and one of the versions of Daffy’s Elixir. The Dicey family, would later develop this business to become one of the two most significant patent medicine businesses in Britain.

== Death ==
William died, suddenly, at Northampton 2 November 1756. His eldest son inherited his London business, subject to his paying £1500 in annuities to his sisters Ann, Mary and Charlotte, and £500 to his brother Robert. The Northampton business was bought by Robert with his legacy but he died in 1757 and it reverted to Cluer. Dicey’s daughters later sued their elder brother over non-payment of their annuities.

== See also ==
A portrait of William Dicey is available at https://artuk.org/visit/collection/northamptonshire-libraries-and-information-service-northamptonshire-central-library-964.

An electronic copy of the William and Cluer Dicey catalogue is available at http://diceyandmarshall.bodleian.ox.ac.uk/refframe.htm

== Bibliography ==
- Giles Bergel, ‘William Dicey and the networks and places of print culture,’ Worlds of print: diversity in the book trade, edited by John Hinks and Catherine Armstrong, (Oak Knoll/British Library, 2006), 149-162.
- Dianne Dugaw, ‘The Popular Marketing of ‘Old Ballads’: the Ballad Revival and Eighteenth-Century Antiquarianism Reconsidered’, Eighteenth Century Studies 21, (1987): pp. 71–90,
- Ian Jackson, ‘Print in Provincial England: Reading and Northampton, 1720-1800’ (unpublished doctoral thesis, University of Oxford (2002)
- Alan Mackintosh, The Patent Medicines Industry in Georgian England: Constructing the Market by the Potency of Print (2018)
- Victor Neuburg, ‘The Diceys and the Chapbook Trade’, The Library, xxiv, (1969), 219-231.
- Victor Neuburg, Chapbooks, 2nd edn (London: Woburn Press, 1972), p. 49.
- Sheila O'Connell, 'The print trade in Hogarth's London,' The London book trade, edited by Robin Myers, Michael Harris, and Giles Mandelbrote, (Oak Knoll/British Library, 2003).
- David Stoker, 'Another look at the Dicey-Marshall publications 1736-1806', The Library: Transactions of the Bibliographical Society, 7th series, XV, (2014), 111-157.
- R.M. Wiles, Freshest advices: early provincial newspapers in England, Ohio State University Press, 1965.
