= Kent Henricksen =

American artist based in New York (born 1974)

Kent Henricksen (born 1974, New Haven) is an American artist based in New York whose work explores race, violence and identity through sculpture, painting, drawing, and installation. Best known for creating fraught environments that are both inviting and menacing, Henricksen came to prominence in 2005 for his work in the MoMA PS1 Greater New York Show. His work is in the permanent collections of the Hirshhorn Museum and Sculpture Garden, Washington D.C., The Fogg Museum at Harvard, and the Collezione Maramotti. Henricksen has shown internationally including John Connelly Presents, New York, hiromiyoshii, Tokyo, Arario, Seoul, and Gerhardsen Gerner, Berlin. Solo museum shows include Bass Museum Miami and the Contemporary Gallery of the Nassau County Museum of Art, Roslyn Harbor, New York.

Henricksen's work has been reviewed in The New York Times.
