= Northampton Mercury =

Newspaper

Gloucester Journal
- Website type: news websites
- Available in: English
- Revenue: Advertising
- Website: northamptonmercury.com
- Current status: Online

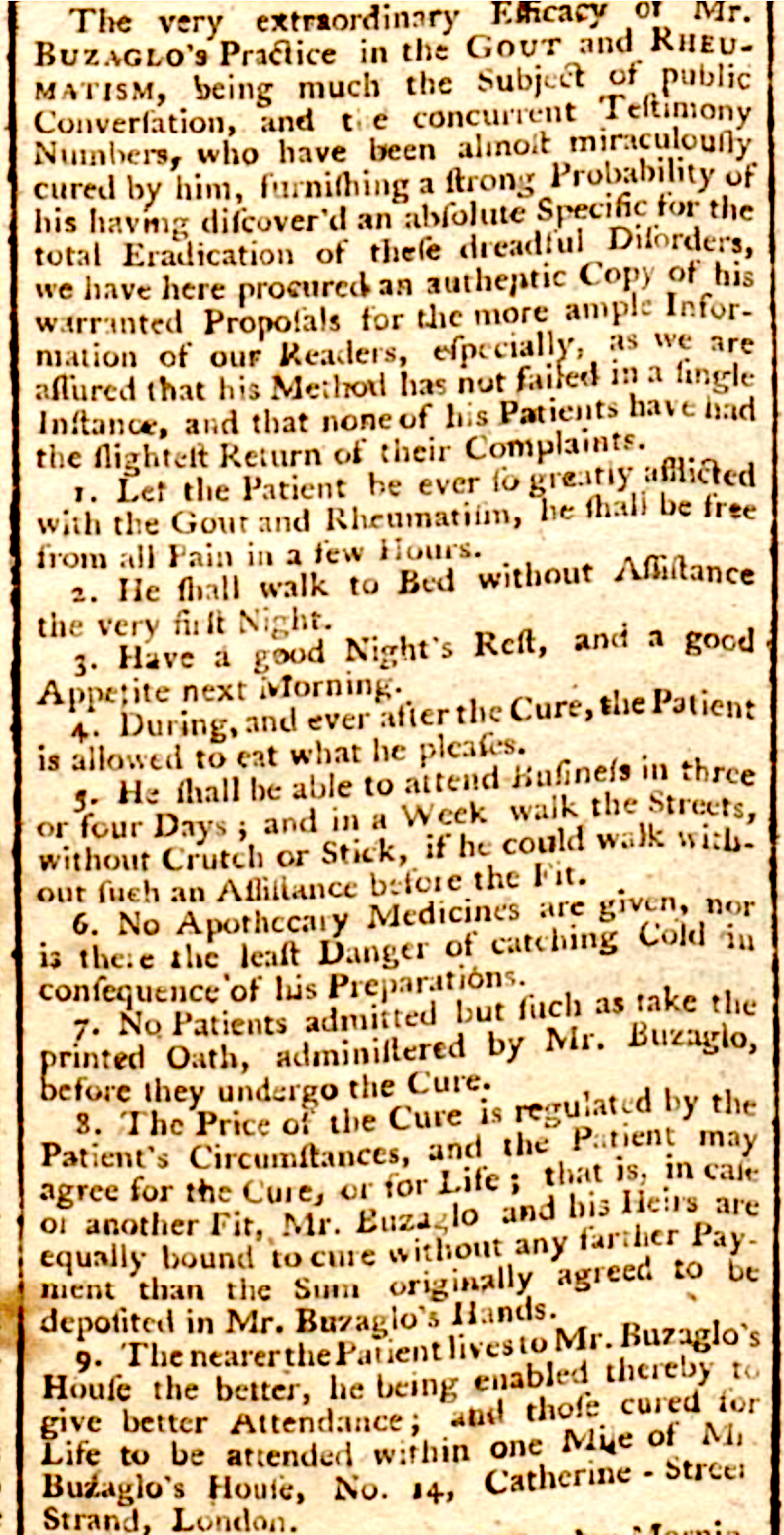

The Northampton Mercury was an English news and media company founded in 1720. Published in Northampton, it was sold throughout the midlands, as far west as Worcester and as far east as Cambridge. When it ceased publication in 2015, it was the oldest continuously published newspaper in the U.K.

== History ==
The Northampton Mercury was founded in 1720 by William Dicey, who had moved to Northampton from London and set up a printing office with Robert Raikes. Ownership of the newspaper remained in the Dicey family through the 19th century. One of its proprietors was Thomas Edward Dicey, senior wrangler in 1811, Chairman of the Midland Railway, and father of jurist A.V. Dicey.

In 1931, it merged with the Northampton Herald, becoming the Mercury & Herald, and was published under that name until 1988, when it became the Northampton Mercury & Herald. It was sold in 1992 to the EMAP newspapers and in 1996 to the Johnston Press group of regional newspapers. In later years it was distributed as a free tabloid companion to the Northampton Chronicle & Echo, the paid-for weekly from the Johnston Press. When it ceased publication in 2015, it was according to its website "the UK’s oldest newspaper with a proven record of continuous publication", with a free circulation of 44,000.
