= Emery Bopp =

American painter and professor

- Born: May 13, 1924; Corry, Pennsylvania, US
- Died: February 1, 2007 (aged 82); Greenville, South Carolina, US
- Resting place: Greenville, South Carolina
- Education: Yale University School of Art
- Occupation: Art professor
- Employer: Bob Jones University
- Title: Chairman, Division of Art

Emery Bopp (May 13, 1924 – February 1, 2007) was an American artist and long-time chairman of the Division of Art, Bob Jones University.

== Early life and education ==
Bopp was born in Corry, Pennsylvania but largely reared in Louisville, Kentucky, except for an impressionable year spent living with a grandfather in rural Stony Creek, New York. After graduating from Louisville Male High School in 1942, he enlisted in the U. S. Navy and served as a hospital corpsman at a naval convalescent hospital in Asheville, North Carolina, within walking distance of the Biltmore Estate. Bopp had early displayed artistic as well as musical and athletic ability, and in the hospital corps he was put to work designing invitations and party decorations. Eventually he also used crafts to speed rehabilitation of convalescent servicemen.

Deciding to become an illustrator, Bopp enrolled (with G. I. Bill money) at Pratt Institute in Brooklyn, where he studied with Khosrov Ajootian and Fritz Eichenberg. He then moved on to the Yale University School of Art, where he received his BFA in 1951 and where his artistic vision was expanded by study under Josef Albers, Alvin Eisenman, Alvin Lustig, and Willem de Kooning. He later attended New York University and earned an MFA at Rochester Institute of Technology in 1961.

== Career ==
=== Teaching ===
In 1951 Bopp joined the art faculty of Bob Jones University (BJU) in Greenville, South Carolina. Two years later, as a thirty-year-old, he was named chair of the division, a position he held for the next 39 years. Later chided by colleagues for investing more time in teaching than in his own work, Bopp responded that teaching was itself "a high calling, an art form with a lasting fruit." A former student, who eventually renounced evangelical Christianity, nevertheless said of Bopp that he was "the first man I met who didn't use his intelligence to transform theology into a weapon. He employed his formidable intelligence to make us into artists and to feed our souls. The best teacher I've ever had. He was a man of such deep spirituality that it was his and rock solid and didn't need to be propped up by talking about it and pushing it on students."

=== Art ===
Bopp was an active member of the South Carolina Artist's Guild, exhibiting extensively and adjudicating competitions throughout the southeast. He won numerous awards, and his work is represented in such museums and permanent collections as the Addison Gallery of American Art, Phillips Academy, the Hunter Gallery in Chattanooga, Tennessee, the South Carolina Arts Commission, Erskine College, the High Museum of Art, and the Greenville County Museum of Art. Bopp also produced sculpture; and for thirty summers, he was associated with the studio of Louis Paul Jonas.

Bopp was a versatile artist using a variety of pictorial techniques in his paintings. Bopp himself said he thought he might have made "a carpenter instead of a painter." According to Jeanet Dreskin, Bopp also emphasized spiritual symbolism with a "subtle interaction of color and the geometric construction of shape and space" that indicated the influence of Albers. According to James Mann, Bopp stressed "the contemplative, intellectual element in his work,"in one case basing a symbolic painting reflecting Platonic universals on Escape from Reason (1968) by Francis Schaeffer.

== Personal life ==
In 1970, Bopp joined two other BJU faculty members, Darell Koons and Carl Blair, in founding Hampton III Gallery, one of the first commercial galleries in Upstate South Carolina. Bopp also enjoyed performing in BJU films and Shakespearean productions, nearly making a career of playing harmless old men.

In 1948, Bopp married Marian Meyer. They had three children, including Jay Bopp, who eventually succeeded his father as chairman of the BJU Division of Art. In 2003 Emery Bopp was diagnosed with a form of Alzheimer's disease, but he continued to paint and held a final exhibition at Hampton III Gallery in November 2006. He died on February 1, 2007. Bopp was survived by his wife, son, and two daughters, Sue Ann Phillips and Laurie Hartz.
