= Carl Blair =

American painter

Carl Blair (November 28, 1932 – January 22, 2018) was an artist and, for more than forty years, a member of the art faculty at Bob Jones University.

== Biography ==
A native of Atchison, Kansas, Blair earned a B. A. in art at the University of Kansas and a M.F.A. from the Kansas City Art Institute. In addition to his teaching at BJU, he also served on the art faculty at KCAI summer programs and as a member of the cooperating faculty at the Greenville County Museum of Art, where he taught evenings and summers for 25 years.

Blair exhibited his work in more than a hundred museums, art galleries and universities and won more than ninety national, state, and regional awards. His works have been purchased for more than 2500 private, corporate, and public collections. His exhibitions include the Art in Embassies Program; Ringling Museum of Art; Morris Museum, Augusta, Ga.; and the Hunter Museum, Chattanooga, Tenn.

In 1995, the Greenville County Museum of Art in Greenville, S.C., hosted a major retrospective of his work. In 2000, a 40-year retrospective show was held at the South Carolina State Museum in Columbia.

Blair referred to his style as "neither realistic nor abstract. I refer to my work as visual poetry". Although best known for his oil, gouache, and acrylic paintings, late in his career, Blair began exhibiting sculpture, especially whimsical animals crafted of plywood or spruce pine boards and accessorized with found objects such as marbles and screws. He recalled telling his BJU students to "never, never grow up and take yourself seriously".

Blair did not discover he was color-blind until he was an art student at the University of Kansas; when asked to do a self-portrait, he painted himself green. He once called his color-blindness an asset because he was "not hindered by color combinations". After a critic called a Blair exhibition dull, inane. and colorless, Blair said he was inspired to use more bright colors in his work.

Blair served as a member of the South Carolina Arts Commission for twelve years and chairman of the commission for two. In 1970, he and two other members of the Bob Jones University art faculty, Emery Bopp and Darell Koons, founded Hampton III Gallery, one of the first commercial galleries in Upstate South Carolina. After he retired from teaching, Blair became president of the gallery, doing "everything from cleaning floors to selecting and hanging art."

In 2005, Blair was awarded the Verner Award for Lifetime Achievement, the highest award given by the state of South Carolina in the arts.

In 2013, the Greenville Metropolitan Arts Council (MAC) created the Carl R. Blair Award for commitment to Arts Education, an award given annually to a Greenville arts educator.

In 2016, MAC honored Blair with the exhibition "Artists Touched by Carl R. Blair", which featured the work of 55 Upstate artists who he had influenced and motivated. In the exhibition catalog, a fellow artist described Blair as "challenging, encouraging, helpful, witty, and inspirational to all his students".
