= Darell Koons =

American painter

Darell John Koons (December 18, 1924 – June 28, 2016) was an American painter. He was a member of the art faculty at Bob Jones University for forty years.

== Biography ==
Born in Albion, Michigan, Koons earned a bachelor's degree in art from BJU in 1951 and a master of arts degree in art education from Western Michigan University in 1955.

Koons had more than 45 one-man exhibitions, including exhibitions at University of South Carolina, Wake Forest University, the Mint Museum, Charlotte, NC, Columbus Museum, Columbus, GA, and the Washington County Museum of Art, Hagerstown, MD; and he participated in at least that many group exhibitions throughout the United States. Of Koons’ approximately 2,700 paintings, hundreds are in public and private collections including the Gibbes Gallery, Charleston, SC; the Greenville County Museum of Art, Greenville, SC; the South Carolina State Art Collection; the Governor’s Mansion, Columbia, SC; The Mint Museum, Charlotte, NC; Eastern Michigan University; Warren Wilson College, Swannanoa, NC; Central Wesleyan College, Central, SC; the W. Clement Stone Collection, Chicago; and the Indonesian Embassy. Koons’ paintings have been published in Contemporary Artists of South Carolina, Artist/U.S.A., and three editions of Prizewinning Art. In September 2019, a retrospective exhibit was held on the campus of Bob Jones University.

Art critics have called Koons' distinctive style “magic realistic,” because the viewer tends to read into the picture more than actually appears. Koons’ deceptively simple paintings, mostly in watercolor or polymer, give the viewer an impression of extreme detail in old buildings such as barns, cotton gins, and mills. In a 2010 interview, Koons told a reporter, "Bob Jones, Sr. once said you can't get the sand out the country boy's ears. That's true with me. An artist must know something about his subject or he will surely have difficulty painting it. My experience as a child and youth in rural Michigan has given me knowledge of my subjects, thus the opportunity to record this passing history of Americana."

In a 1972 interview, Koons noted that he enjoyed playing with space, especially in a building opening. He virtually never included figures in his paintings but he often teased the viewer with open doors that "give the impression of recent activity." Koons’ work has been compared to that of Andrew Wyeth, although Koons himself believed the greatest influences on his art were the shadows and simplicity of Edward Hopper and the straight lines of Mondrian.

Koons made a hobby of giving religious “chalk talks” to church groups especially during the Christmas and Easter seasons. In 1970, Koons joined two other BJU faculty members, Emery Bopp and Carl Blair, to found Hampton III Gallery, one of the first commercial galleries in Upstate South Carolina.
