= Street literature =

Types of publication sold in public areas

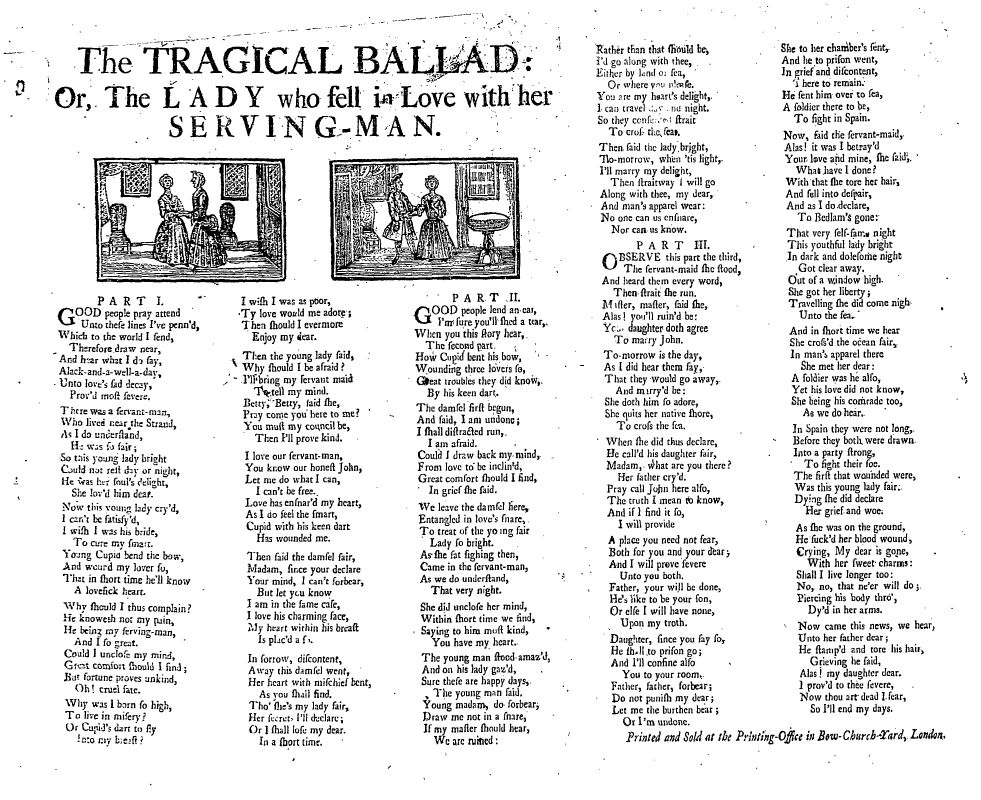
An 18th-century broadside ballad: The tragical ballad: or, the lady who fell in love with her serving-man.

Street literature is any of several different types of publication sold on the streets, at fairs and other public gatherings, by travelling hawkers, pedlars or chapmen, from the fifteenth to the nineteenth centuries. Robert Collison's account of the subject describes street literature as the "forerunner of the popular press".

Leslie Shepard's History of Street Literature identifies a range of different publications as indicated by the subtitle: The Story of Broadside Ballads, Chapbooks, Proclamations, News-Sheets, Election Bills, Tracts, Pamphlets, Cocks, Catchpennies, and Other Ephemera. Street literature therefore includes several different printed formats and publication types.

== Broadside ballad ==
Broadside ballads are traditional ballads printed on one side of a full sheet or half sheet of paper, often in landscape orientation. Intended to be pasted on to walls for public consultation.

== Chapbook ==
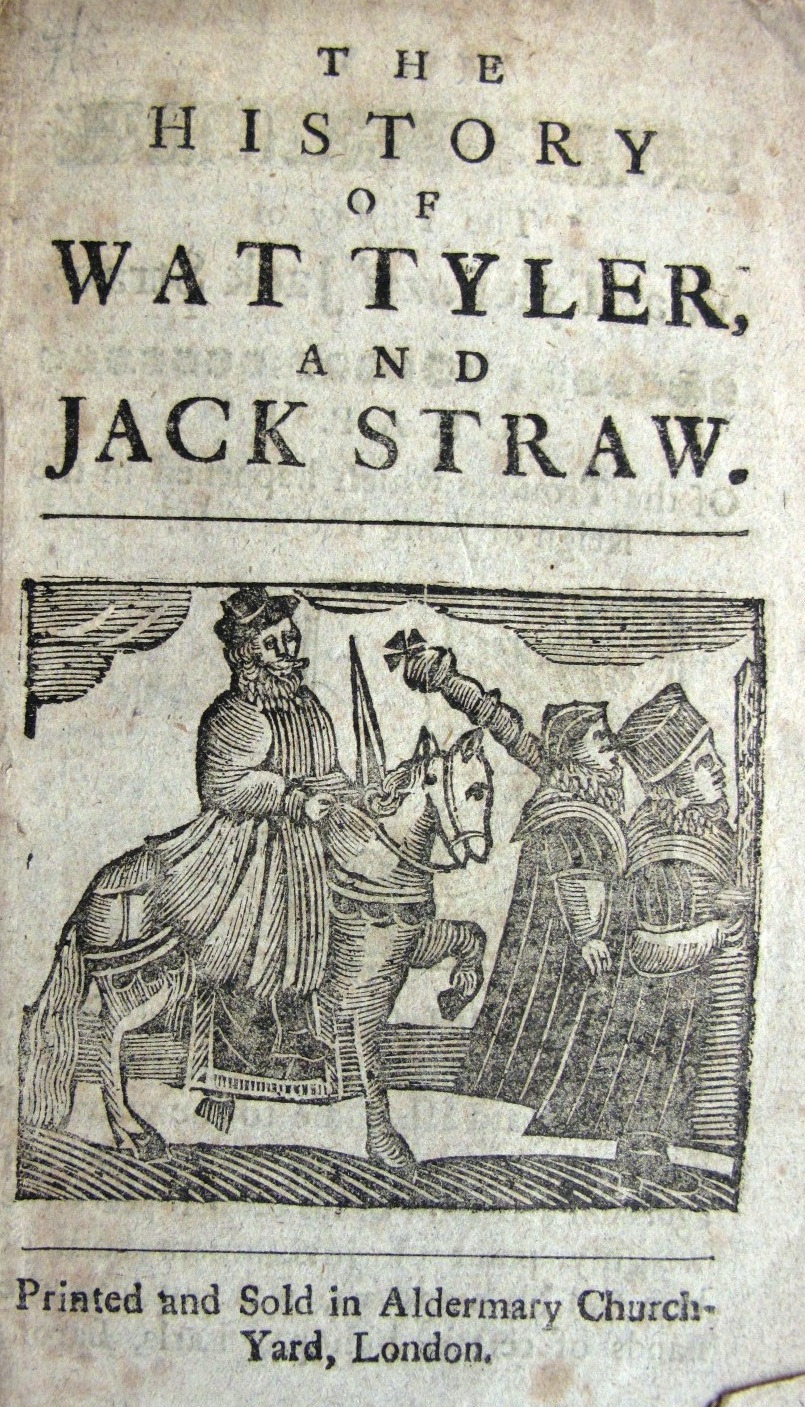
An example of a chapbook history

Chapbooks were small, paper-covered booklets, usually printed on a single sheet and folded into books of 8, 12, 16 or 24 pages, either stitched or unstitched. There are several sub-categories of chapbook, notably:

- Histories - 12 or 24- page booklets containing popular accounts of historical figures, traditional tales, fairy stories etc.
- Patters - 8 or 16-page publications containing simple religious texts, humorous or sensational stories such as accounts of murders or natural disaster. Sold by a patterer, which was 'a noisy talkative street hawker of songs, last dying speeches, &c.'.
- Collections - 8 or 16-page publications containing collections of the lyrics of popular songs.

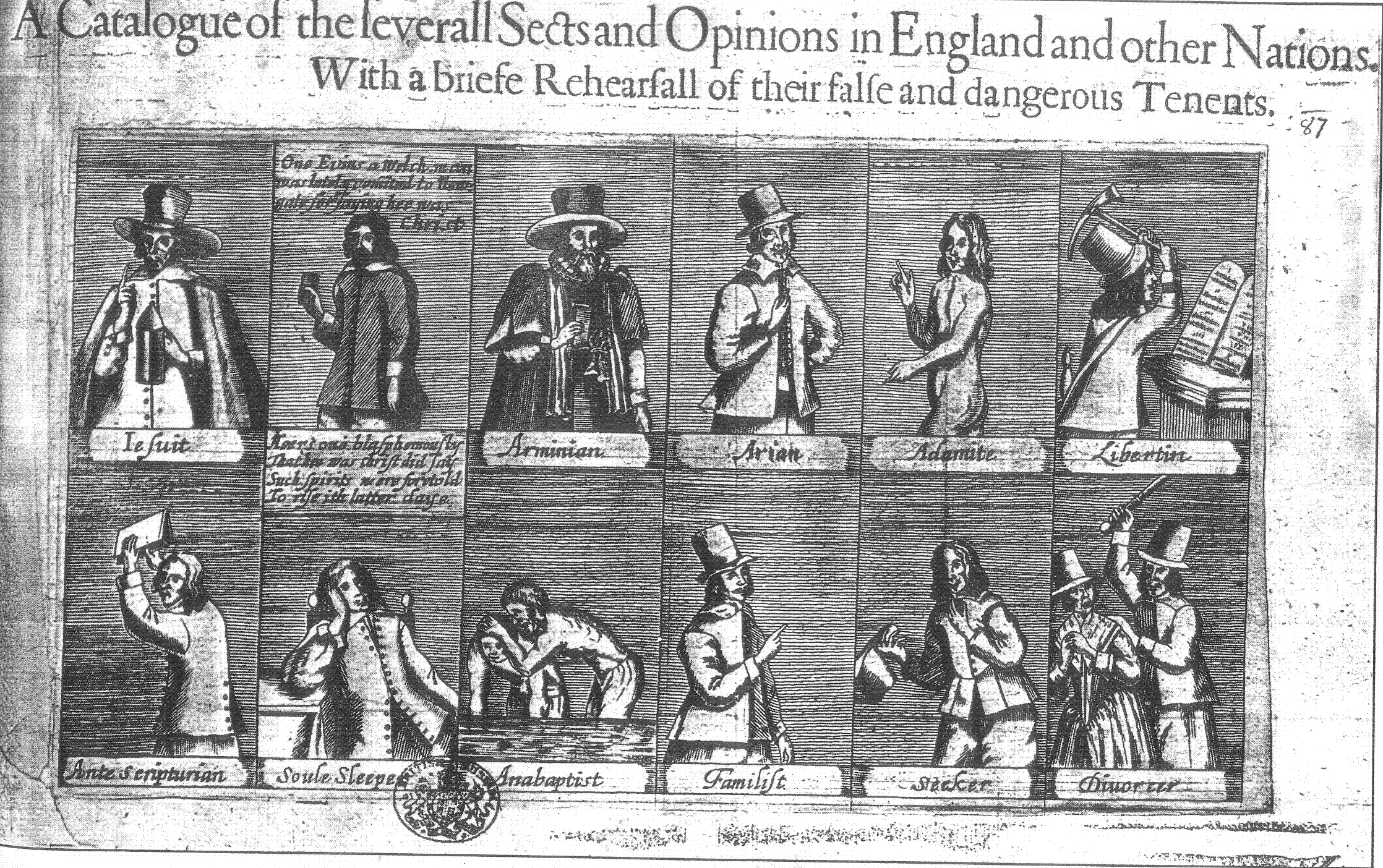
A Catalogue of the Severall Sects and Opinions in England and other Nations. 1647. An example of a satirical popular print.

== Popular prints ==
Popular prints encompass a wide range of cheap printed images of differing sizes and for different purposes. They were generally of low artistic merit and often contained sensational, humorous or bawdy subjects.

== Slip songs ==
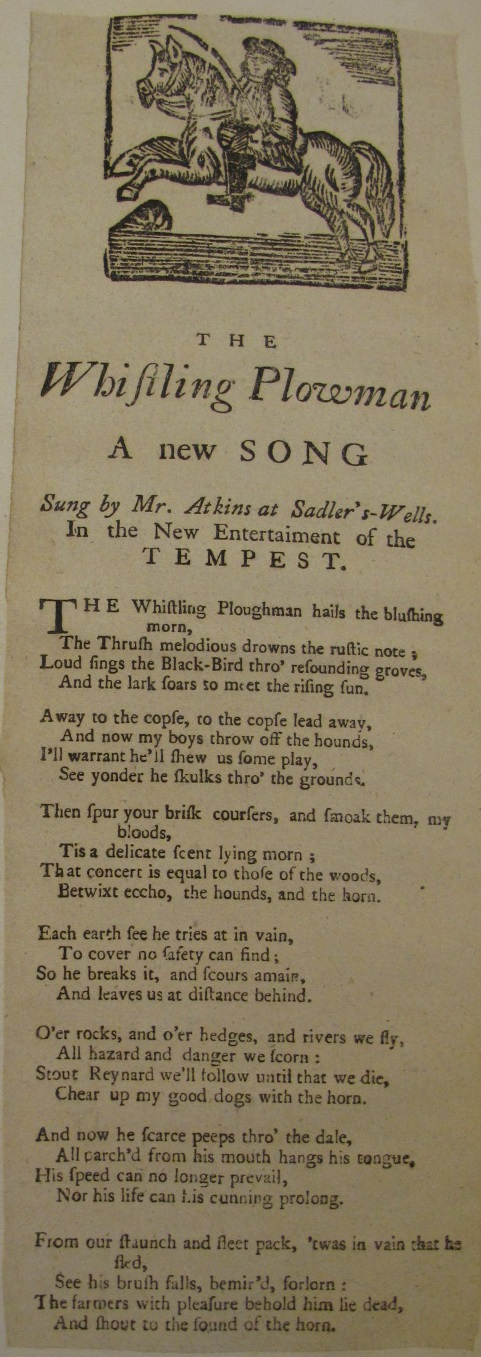
An 18th-century slip-song: "The Whistling Plowman"

The lyrics of popular songs printed four or eight to a sheet and cut into slips, to be sold to theatre-goers or those attending other places of public entertainment.

== Other terms used ==
While the term street literature (coined in the mid-nineteenth century) is common, there are several other terms used in association with street literature which categorise the type of content rather than the format. These terms are not mutually exclusive

Almanac
an annual publication listing a set of events forthcoming in the next year.
Catchpenny
cheap, mass-produced sheets printed on one side on unfolded sheets of paper.
Cock
fictitious narratives, in verse or prose, of murders, fires, and terrible accidents, sold in the streets as true accounts. "The man who hawks them, a patterer, often changes the scene of the awful event to suit the taste of the neighbourhood he is trying to delude."
Garland
originally used as an anthology of poems on a particular subject but the term was later used as a general descriptor in the titles of broadside ballads and chapbook histories (e.g. 'The amorous lady's garland; or, the handsome butcher of St. James's Market').
New-sheet
single sheets containing accounts of sensational news (murders, accounts of battles, natural disasters etc.), the fore-runners of newspapers, but published intermittently rather than serially.
Squib
a handbill containing short humorous or satiric writing, often associated with elections.
Gallows literature
a collective term for the biographies, confessions, "last speeches," and other verses supposedly written by felons, sold at public executions.
Tracts
some religious and political tracts would come under the category of street literature, especially those (such as the Cheap Repository Tracts) designed for popular consumption and to replace other forms of street literature.

Other printed items such as advertisements, playbills, handbills, public notices, etc. are sometimes listed under this term but since they are not sold they would be better described as printed ephemera.

== Bibliography ==
- Ashton, John. Modern Street Ballads. New Introduction by Leslie Shepard. London: Chatto & Windus, 1888. Reissued by Singing Tree Press, 1968.
- David Atkinson, Steve Roud. Street Literature of the Long Nineteenth Century: Producers, Sellers, Consumers, (Newcastle upon Tyne : Cambridge Scholars Publishing 2017). 9781443894999
- Robert Collison. The Story of Street Literature: Forerunner of the Popular Press, (London : Dent 1973). 0460039741.
- Charles Hindley, The True History of Tom and Jerry; or, The Day and Night Scenes of Life in London from the Start to the Finish! (London: Charles Hindley, 1886).
- A Dictionary of Modern Slang, Cant, and Vulgar Words, 2nd edn (London: John Camden Hotten, 1860).
- John Morrison and Harold Burdekin. Curiosities of Street Literature: Comprising "Cocks" or "Catchpennies", a Large and Curious Assortment of Street-drolleries, Squibs, Histories, Comic Tales in Prose and Verse, Broadsides on the Royal Family, Political Litanies, Dialogues, Catechisms, Acts of Parliament, Street Political Papers, a Variety of "Ballads on a Subject," Dying Speeches and Confessions: to which is attached the all-important and necessary affectionate copy of verses, (London : Reeves and Turner 1871).
- Leslie Shephard. The History of Street Literature: The Story of Broadside Ballads, Chapbooks, Proclamations, News-sheets, Election Bills, Tracts, Pamphlets, Cocks, Catchpennies, and Other Ephemera, (Newton Abbott: David & Charles 1973).
- Susan C. Staub. Nature's Cruel Stepdames: Murderous Women in the Street Literature of Seventeenth century England, (Pittsburgh, Penn.: Duquesne University Press [2004]).
