= The Most Courageous Raid of WWII =

- Directed by: Francis Whately
- Based on: Operation Frankton
- Produced by: Francis Whately
- Narrated by: Paddy Ashdown
- Cinematography: Lawrence Gardner
- Edited by: Paul Binns
- Music by: Adrian Williams
- Production company: BBC
- Distributed by: BBC Two
- Release date: 1 November 2011 (UK)
- Running time: 60 minutes
- Country: United Kingdom
- Language: English

The Most Courageous Raid of WWII is a 2011 British television docudrama produced and directed by Francis Whately. The film was narrated by former British politician and diplomat Paddy Ashdown, and also features commentary from military historian M.R.D. Foot. It premiered on 1 November 2011, on BBC Two, on the British television series Timewatch.

== Synopsis ==
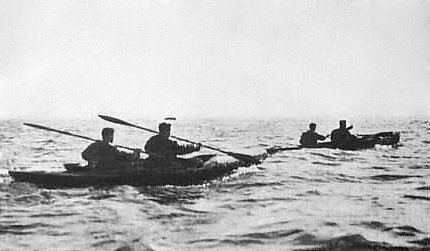
Sailors on the folding kayaks at the beginning of the attack on the Port of Bordeaux (1942)

Paddy Ashdown walks viewers through a dangerous mission carried out by ten Royal Marines who led one of the most daring raids of WWII. The sailors canoed almost seventy miles behind enemy lines to blow up enemy ships. Ashdown reconstructs the events through interviews, commentary and archival footage from British Movietone News, the Imperial War Museum, The National Archives (United Kingdom), The National Archives (Washington D.C.), the Royal Marines Museum, the Royal Navy Archives and the Deutsches U-Boot Museum. Out of the ten sailors, only two survived, while the others died of hypothermia or were executed by the Nazis.

== Cast ==
- Paddy Ashdown
- M.R.D. Foot
- Norman Colley
- Jeanne Baudray
- Nigel Cole
- Giles Maythan
- Olivia Stocker

Archive footage

- Winston Churchill
- Herbert Hasler
- Adolf Hitler
- Louis Mountbatten
- Roundell Palmer

== Background ==
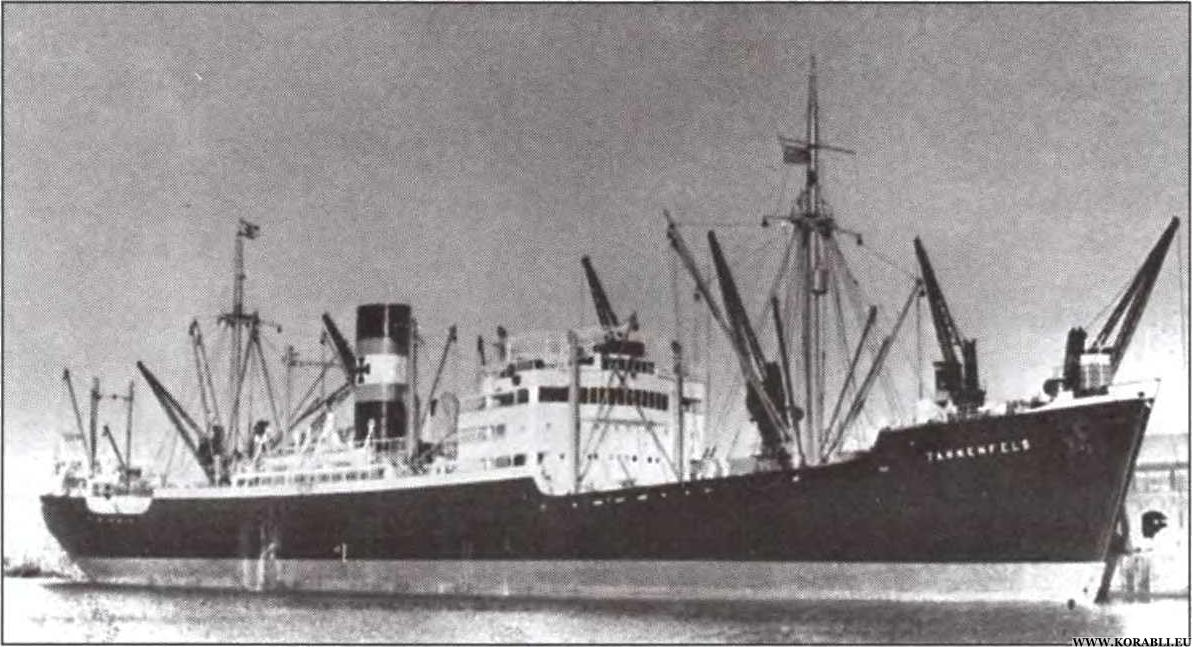
Tannenfels, a German blockade runner which was sunk in Bordeaux harbour from the Frankton team

Operation Frankton was a commando raid on ships in the German occupied French port of Bordeaux in southwest France during World War II. The raid was carried out by a small unit of Royal Marines known as the Royal Marines Boom Patrol Detachment, part of Combined Operations, inserted by HMS Tuna, captained by Lieutenant-Commander Dick Raikes.

The plan was for six folding kayaks to be taken to the area of the Gironde estuary by submarine. Twelve men would then paddle by night to Bordeaux. On arrival they would attack the docked cargo ships with limpet mines and then escape overland to Spain. Men from no.1 section were selected for the raid; including the commanding officer, Herbert "Blondie" Hasler, and with the reserve marine Colley the team numbered thirteen in total. One kayak was damaged while being deployed from the submarine, and it and its crew therefore could not take part in the mission. Only two of the ten men who launched from the submarine survived the raid: Hasler, and his number two in the kayak, Bill Sparks. Of the other eight, six were executed by the Germans and two died from hypothermia. Two German vessels were sunk with another four suffering varying degrees of damage.

Ashdown, who narrated the documentary, said "such a raid – men sent out with no backup – would not happen today, the triumph of leadership of the Cockleshell Heroes is that they were ordinary people – a coal merchant's clerk, a milkman, a weaver – but invested in courage and skill by 'Blondie' Hasler, the major who led the raid".

== Reception ==
British author Martin Davidson said "it's a really moving film and hopefully one that honours all of the brave men that devised and carried out the raid". David Chater of The Times notes that "there were 10,000 German troops stationed in the town, and the estuary was so heavily defended that the raid amounted to a suicide mission ... nonetheless, it remains to this day a legendary tale of derring-do". Jonathan Wright wrote in The Guardian, that "a beleaguered Winston Churchill needed to strike against Nazi Germany, yet his options were 'savagely limited' ... this meant the authorities were prepared to listen to leftfield ideas such as those of Blondie Hasler, who believed commandos in canoes could inflict heavy damage, which is how Hasler came to lead a small unit of Royal Marines on 'a suicide mission by any other name', and the legend of the Cockleshell heroes was born".

John Preston wrote in The Sunday Telegraph that the recreation depicted in the film "was extremely well done, with disaster both on foot and in Ashdown's imagination ... as it went on, though, it became increasingly literal and plodding ... nonetheless, the subject cried out for a bolder, more impressionistic approach". Toby Dantzic from The Daily Telegraph said it was a "gripping documentary with dramatic reconstructions that make vivid a mission marked by tragedy, betrayal and bravery".

== See also ==
- The Cockleshell Heroes
- List of Timewatch episodes
