= Robert Raikes (Royal Navy officer) =

British admiral

Admiral Sir Robert Raikes KCB CVO DSO
- Born: 23 August 1885
- Died: 24 May 1953 (aged 67); London, England
- Military career
- Allegiance: United Kingdom
- Branch: Royal Navy
- Service years: 1900–1944
- Rank: Admiral
- Commands: South Atlantic Station
- Conflicts: World War I World War II
- Awards: Knight Commander of the Order of the Bath; Commander of the Royal Victorian Order; Distinguished Service Order

Admiral Sir Robert Henry Taunton Raikes KCB CVO DSO (23 August 1885 – 24 May 1953) was a Royal Navy officer who went on to be Commander-in-Chief, South Atlantic Station.

== Early life and education ==
Raikes was born in Chislehurst, Kent, the fifth son of Robert Taunton Raikes, and his wife, Rosa Margaret Cripps. He was educated at Radley College and aboard HMS Britannia in September 1900.

== Naval career ==
Raikes joined the Royal Navy in 1900, and as a midshipman was in February 1903 posted to the battleship HMS Caesar, serving in the Mediterranean Fleet. He served in World War I, earning the DSO in 1916, and went on to be Chief of Staff to the Commander-in-Chief, Portsmouth before becoming Director of the Royal Navy Staff College at Greenwich in 1932. He was made Chief of Staff of the Mediterranean Fleet in 1934 and Admiral in charge on a temporary basis at Alexandria in Egypt during the Abyssinian war in 1936 before becoming Rear Admiral Submarines in 1936. He served in World War II initially as Vice Admiral commanding the Reserve Fleet destroyers on the Northern Patrol before becoming Commander-in-Chief, South Atlantic Station in 1940. He went on to be Flag Officer, Aberdeen from 1942 to 1944.

He lived at Mantyley Chase in Newent in Gloucestershire.

== Family ==
He married Ida Guinevere Evans. His son, Iwan Raikes, also served in the Royal Navy and became Flag Officer, Submarines. His nephew, Lieutenant-Commander Dick Raikes DSO, also served in the Royal Navy and launched Operation Frankton, the first SBS personnel of the Royal Marines Commandos on their raid using the klepper canoe against German shipping in the Gironde estuary in 1942. The story was told in the classic 1955 film The Cockleshell Heroes starring Trevor Howard.

Military offices
Preceded by Cecil Talbot	Rear-Admiral Submarines; 1936–1938	Succeeded by Bertram Watson
Preceded by Sir George Lyon	Commander-in-Chief, South Atlantic Station; 1940–1941	Succeeded by Sir Algernon Willis
