= DSDA =

DSDA may refer to:

- Defence Storage and Distribution Agency, a previous executive agency of the Government of the United Kingdom under the Ministry of Defence (MoD).
- Dual SIM Dual Active, a dual SIM phone that can use two SIM cards at the same time.
- Doom Speed Demo Archive, an archive for Doom (1993 video game) speedruns.
