= Combined Military Services Museum =

Military museum in Maldon, Essex, England

Coordinates: 51.7349°N 0.6832°E

- Established: July 5, 2004
- Location: Combined Military Services Museum; Station Road; Maldon; Essex; CM9 4LQ; United Kingdom
- Type: War museum
- Website: cmsm.co.uk

The Combined Military Services Museum in Maldon, Essex, was opened on 5 July 2004. Richard Wooldridge set it up to house a personal collection he had created over many years. A charity was established in 1996 to facilitate the funding of a museum building. A suitable property was found in 2001, a former bonded warehouse in Maldon. This underwent considerable modification to suit its new purpose. During the period of setting up the museum, the initial collection was expanded by donations and acquisitions. In 2007, a National Lottery grant was given to extend the museum to house the Donnington Historic Weapons Collection. These works were completed in November 2008.

Amongst the items in the museum is a Cockle Mark II canoe from the "cockleshell heroes" raid, Operation Frankton, and a large collection of Special Operations Executive (SOE) equipment and the Donnington Historic Weapons Collection. The Donnington collection also holds a replica of the Victoria Cross metal, a piece of bronze from a captured cannon from which all Victoria Crosses have been made. The original metal is still closely guarded within MoD Donnington. Amongst the rarest items in the museum are the Riggal Papers. These are the training records of Captain P M Riggal, an instructor in the SOE, found 50 years after the end of the Second World War.

On 7 September 2016, nearly 100 artefacts from the museum's SOE and Mason collections were shipped to the Musée de l'Armée in Paris for an exhibition called "Guerres Secretes" ("Secret Wars"), to run from 12 October 2016 to 29 January 2017.
