= HMS Tuna (N94) =

T-class submarine of the Royal Navy, in service from 1940 to 1945

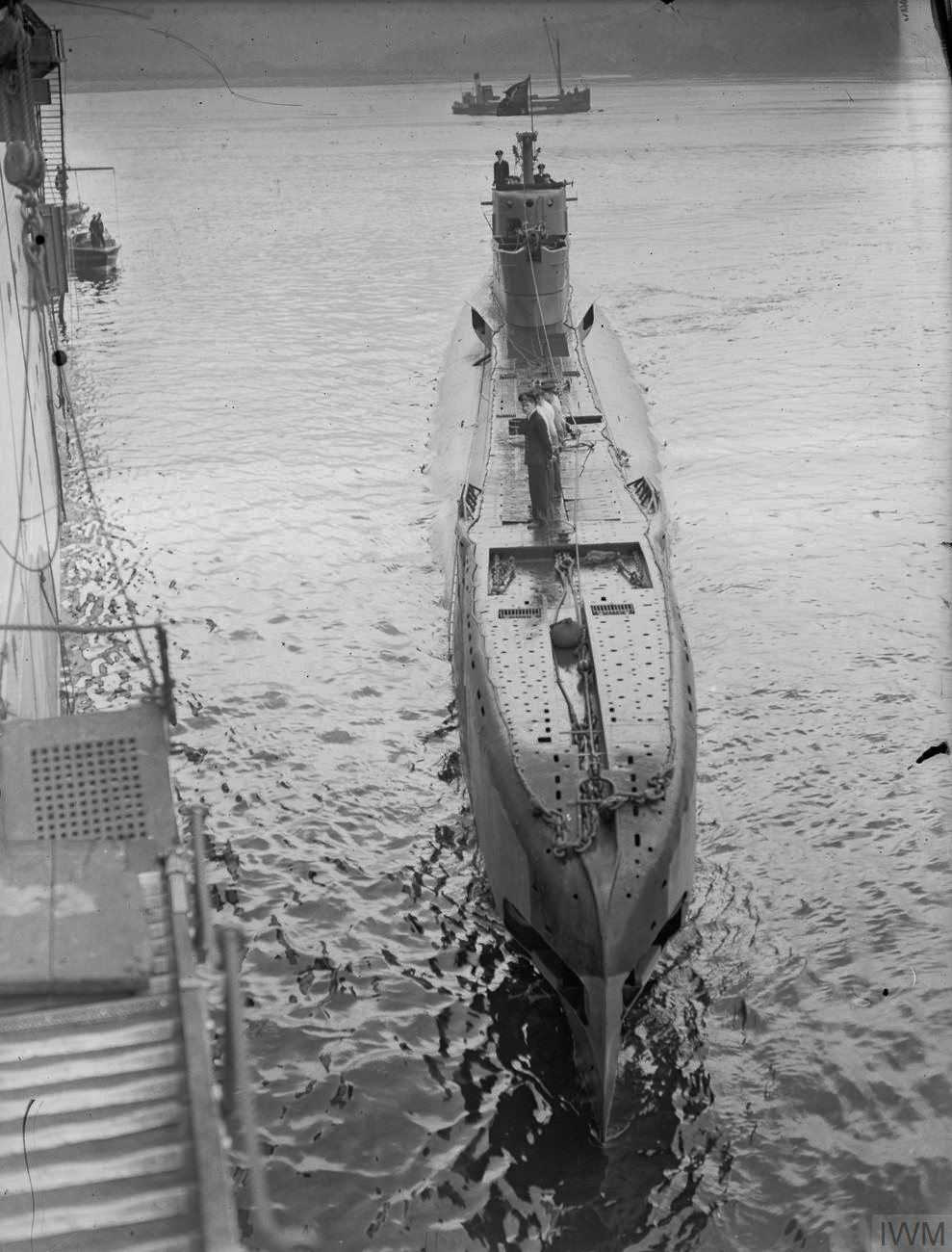
- HMS Tuna approaching the submarine depot ship HMS Forth in Holy Loch (Scotland) in August 1943

History

United Kingdom
- Name: HMS Tuna
- Owner: Royal Navy
- Ordered: 9 December 1937
- Builder: Scotts, Greenock
- Laid down: 13 June 1938
- Launched: 10 May 1940
- Commissioned: 1 August 1940
- Identification: Pennant number N94
- Honours and awards: North Sea 1939-45; Biscay 1940-45
- Fate: Sold to broken up, 19 December 1945; Scrapped in June 1946
- Badge

General characteristics
- Class & type: British T class submarine
- Displacement: 1,090 tons surfaced; 1,575 tons submerged
- Length: 275 ft (84 m)
- Beam: 26 ft 6 in (8.08 m)
- Draught: 16.3 ft (5.0 m)
- Propulsion: Two shafts; Twin diesel engines 2,500 hp (1.86 MW) each; Twin electric motors 1,450 hp (1.08 MW) each
- Speed: 15.25 knots (28.7 km/h) surfaced; Nine knots (20 km/h) submerged
- Range: 4,500 nautical miles at 11 knots (8,330 km at 20 km/h) surfaced
- Test depth: 300 ft (91 m) max
- Complement: 59
- Armament: Six internal forward-facing 21-inch (533 mm) torpedo tubes; Four external forward-facing torpedo tubes; Six reload torpedoes; 1 x 4-inch (102 mm) deck gun

HMS Tuna (N94) was a T-class submarine of the Royal Navy. She was laid down by Scotts, Greenock (in Scotland) and launched on 10 May 1940. She was equipped with German-built MAN Diesel engines and spent her career in World War II in western European waters, in the North Sea and off the west coast of France, and most famously taking part in Operation Frankton.

The raid on Bordeaux harbour was later dramatised in the 1955 film The Cockleshell Heroes. Tuna also took part in many war patrols and her crew received service medals for the boat's destruction of several U-boats.

== Design and description ==
Tuna was ordered from Scotts Shipbuilding and Engineering Company on 9 December 1937, as part of an extension of the 1937 construction programme, with an initial four submarines ordered earlier that year in July. Tuna was part of a further three boats to be ordered, along with Triad and Truant, which were obtained from another shipbuilder.

She was equipped with diesel engines produced by MAN SE, a German company. The engines had been delivered before the war, and spare parts were rare, members of the crew at least once creating replacement parts from other equipment while at sea.

== Wartime service ==
Tuna had a relatively active career, serving in the North Sea and off the French and Scandinavian coasts.

=== Attacks on shipping and submarines ===
Tuna sank the 7,230-ton merchantman Tirranna on 22 September 1940. The Tirranna was a Norwegian ship that had been captured by the German armed merchant cruiser Atlantis, in the Indian Ocean. Tirranna had 292 on board when she was sunk, including at least 264 captured Allied sailors and a 16-strong German prize crew. Eighty-seven people died in the sinking, including one German. She also torpedoed and sank the German catapult ship Ostmark and the French tug Chassiron. She fired upon and sank the German submarine U-644 and attacked the German submarine U-302 and the Italian submarine Brin as well as two unidentified submarine contacts, all unsuccessfully. An attack also failed on the German tanker Benno, formerly the Norwegian Ole Jacob, which had also been captured earlier by the Atlantis.

In January 1941 Tuna and the submarine Snapper were escorted by the captured French minesweeper La Capricieuse as far as Bishop Rock, Isles of Scilly. Snapper left for a different patrol area and was presumed lost after she failed to return. Later that month Tuna engaged and pursued an unidentified surfaced U-boat at night for more than an hour. She fired the forward-mounted four-inch gun and damage was noted to the U-boat's conning tower. The German vessel returned the fire with an aft-mounted gun, but no damage was reported by Tuna. The pursuit was called off after more enemy vessels appeared, Tuna diving to avoid them.

In February 1942 the boat was ordered towards the Trondheim area along with HMS Trident to protect a convoy from enemy sorties from Norwegian ports. Although Tuna did not engage the enemy, Trident damaged the German cruiser Prinz Eugen.

=== 'Cockleshell' raid and decorations ===
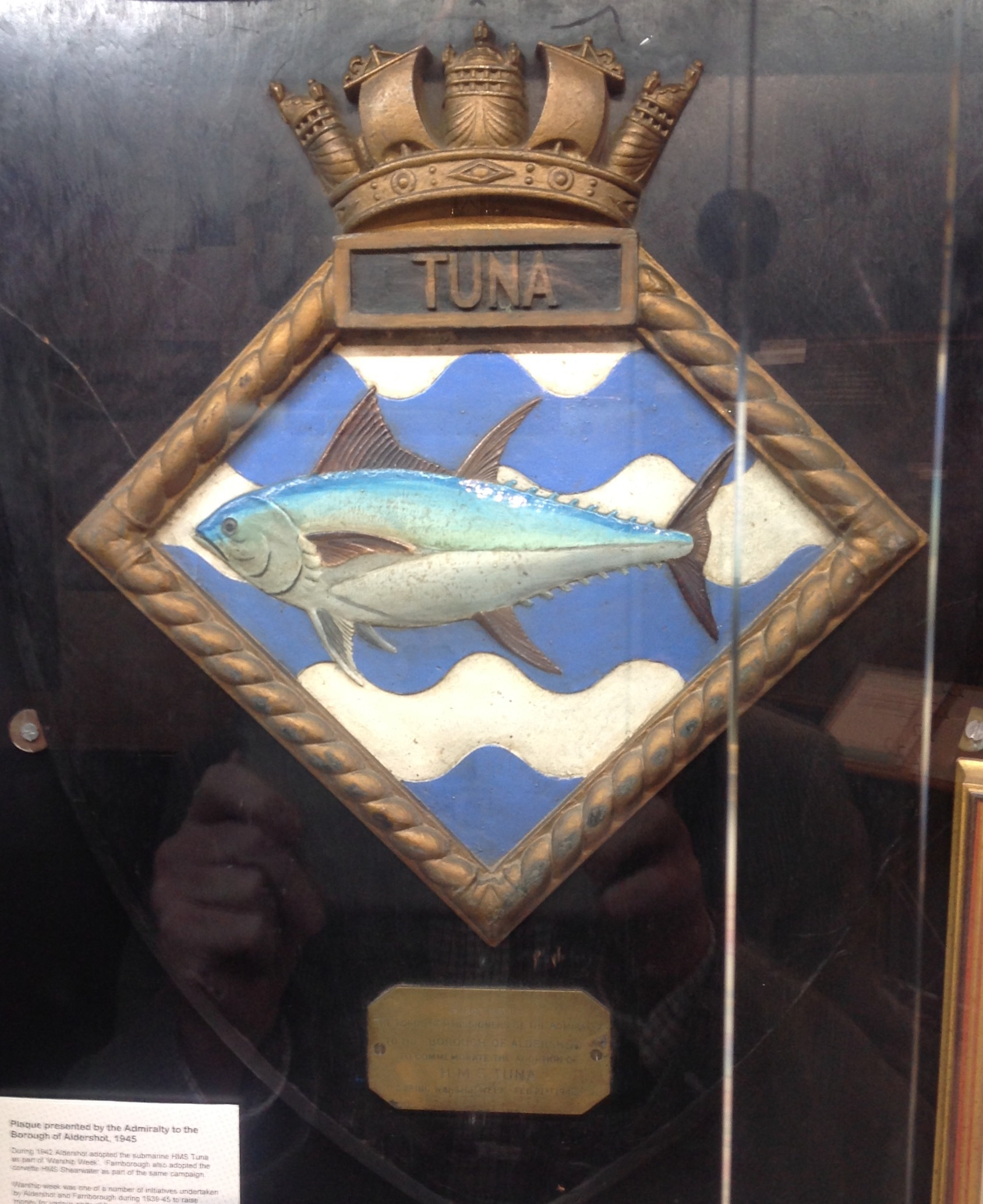
HMS Tuna plaque, presented to the Borough of Aldershot to commemorate Warship Week in 1942

On 30 November 1942, under the command of Lieutenant-Commander Dick Raikes DSO, Tuna sailed from Holy Loch, Scotland, inserting twelve Royal Marines swimmer canoeist commandos soon to become the SBS into the Gironde estuary as part of Operation Frankton (the attack on Bordeaux harbour). She was to arrive on 6 December but was delayed due to bad weather and the presence of a minefield. She arrived at the estuary a day late, surfacing 10 miles (16 km) from the mouth of the river.

The aim of the operation was for several canoes of marines to paddle 60 miles up the Gironde to attack German ships in Bordeaux; in the process of disembarking the canoes, one of the six canoes was damaged, leaving the submarine to return those marines while the remainder continued the assault. The operation was a success although only Corporal Bill Sparks and Major Herbert Hasler survived. The mission led to the formation of the Special Boat Service. For his superb navigation and coolness under pressure, Lieutenant-Commander Dick Raikes was awarded the Distinguished Service Order, and was later played by Christoper Lee in the 1955 film The Cockleshell Heroes.

Tuna returned to home waters for the first time in four war patrols on 18 November 1943. For the destruction of three U-boats during those patrols, her commanding officer, Lieutenant D. S. R. Martin, was awarded the Distinguished Service Order with two bars. Additionally, the Distinguished Service Cross was awarded to Lt (E) N. Travers, and the Distinguished Service Medal to four other members of the crew including Chief Petty Officer William J Stabb and Leading Seaman Dominic "Bommy" King.

In August 1945, she attended the first British Navy week in a foreign port, in Rotterdam. Also there were the cruiser HMS Bellona and the destroyers Garth and Onslow. Foreign vessels included two of the Dutch Navy submarines of the T-class, Dolfijn and Zeehond.

In 1942 the Borough of Aldershot adopted the Tuna as part of the Warship Week campaign.

== Post war ==
Tuna survived the war and was sold to be broken up for scrap on 19 December 1945, a job carried out at one of Thos. W. Ward shipbreaking yards at Briton Ferry from June 1946.
