= Donnington Historic Weapons Collection =

Military Museum

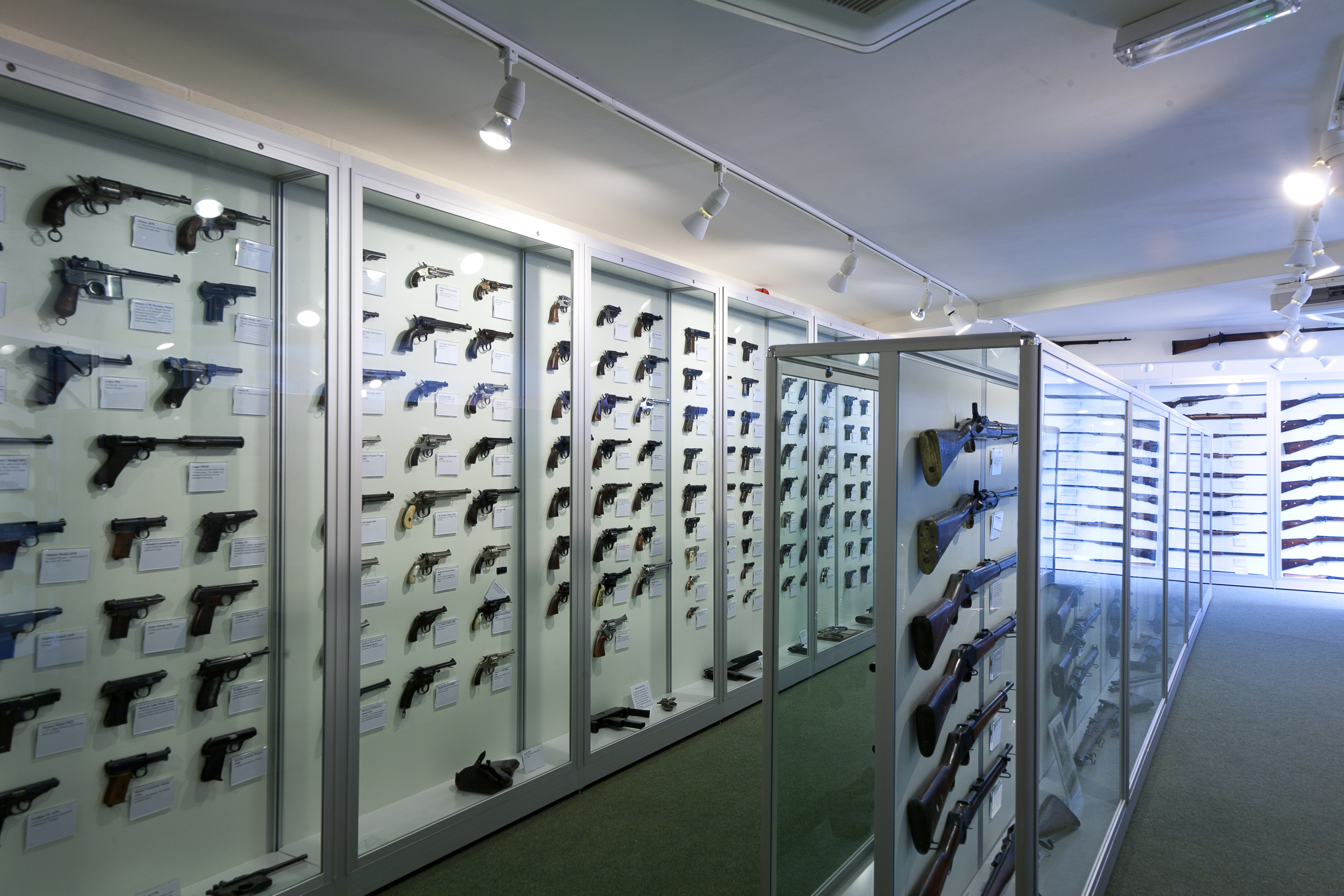
- Part of the Donnington Historic Weapons Collection Display
- Housed at: Combined Military Services Museum

The Donnington Historic Weapons Collection is a collection of weapons accumulated by MoD Donnington in Shropshire, England, over a long period of time. It is now housed at the Combined Military Services Museum in Maldon, Essex, England.

== The collection ==
MoD Donnington was part of the Defence Storage and Distribution Agency (DSDA). Historically Donnington was the storage area for all weapons used by the British Army. Part of this function was the disposal of old, captured and obsolete weapons. The majority of these were converted to scrap metal. In the years Donnington has been functioning, many items returned for disposal were deemed worthy of retaining because of their rarity or historic significance.

In all, a collection of over 700 items was amassed varying from civilian and sporting arms to captured foreign weapons.

In 2010, a decision was made by the Ministry of Defence to gift the collection to a public museum. Under the guidance of Kevan Jones MP, then Under Secretary for Defence it was decided that the Combined Military Services Museum in Maldon, Essex would be the recipient of the collection. The museum received a lottery grant to extend its premises to facilitate this and now has it on public display.

The existence and details of the Donnington collection and its transfer to a public museum appears in the DSDA Annual report and accounts for 2008–2009.

The opening ceremony of the collection to the public at the Combined Military Services Museum in Maldon, was performed by Kevan Jones, the Under Secretary for Defence, in April 2010.
