= Mary Lindell =

British-born nurse, French Resistance member (1895–1987)

- Born: Ghita Mary Lindell; September 11, 1895; Sutton, London, England, UK
- Died: January 8, 1987 (aged 91); France
- Other names: Marie-Claire, Comtesse de Milleville, Comtesse de Moncy
- Occupation: Nurse
- Awards: Croix de Guerre, France, World War I; Croix de Guerre, France, World War II; Order of the British Empire; Medal of Freedom, United States

Gertrude Mary Lindell (11 September 1895 – 8 January 1987), Comtesse de Milleville, code named Marie-Claire and Comtesse de Moncy, was an English woman, a front-line nurse in World War I and a member of the French Resistance in World War II. She founded and led an escape and evasion organization, the Marie-Claire Line, helping Allied airmen and soldiers escape from Nazi-occupied France. The airmen were survivors of military airplanes shot down over occupied Europe. During the course of the war, Lindell was run over by an automobile, shot in the head, imprisoned twice, and captured and sent to Ravensbrück concentration camp in Nazi Germany. Her son Maurice was captured and tortured. Her son Octave (Oky), also captured, disappeared and presumably died in a German concentration camp.

Outspoken, controversial, and imperious, Lindell was called a "false heroine" by one critic, but she is credited with helping about 100 Allied airmen escape from France. At Ravensbrück she was the self-appointed leader of the British and American women imprisoned in the camp and as a nurse helped some of them survive. She advocated successfully with her German captors for the release of 47 American and British women to the Swedish Red Cross in the closing days of World War II.

Lindell was awarded the Croix de Guerre twice, once for her work in World War I and once for World War II.

A pioneer of the resistance, founder in the first days of the German occupation of an escape line for Allied personnel, a dedicated agent...arrested in 1941, she resumed her activity when released from prison, serving the cause regardless of cost, always ready at her post until arrested and deported at the end of February 1944.

— Citation, Croix de Guerre.

== Early life ==
Lindell was born to a wealthy family in Surrey, England. Her father William was a solicitor and mother, Gertrude Colls, was of the Colls family, the daughter of a successful architect.

During the First World War, she served as a member of the Voluntary Aid Detachment (VAD) and subsequently with the Secours aux Blessés, a division of the French Red Cross. She was decorated for her bravery and service by the French, receiving a Croix de Guerre in 1918. She was also decorated by the Tsarist Russian government.

She married the Count Marie Joseph de Milleville, a member of the French aristocracy, and settled in Paris. The couple had three children: two boys, Maurice, (b. 1921) and Octave, and a daughter, Marie, whom she called Barbé. All were teenagers in 1940. When Nazi Germany invaded France in May 1940, Lindell and her children were living in a luxurious apartment in Paris. Her husband was on a business trip to South America.

== The Marie-Claire Line ==
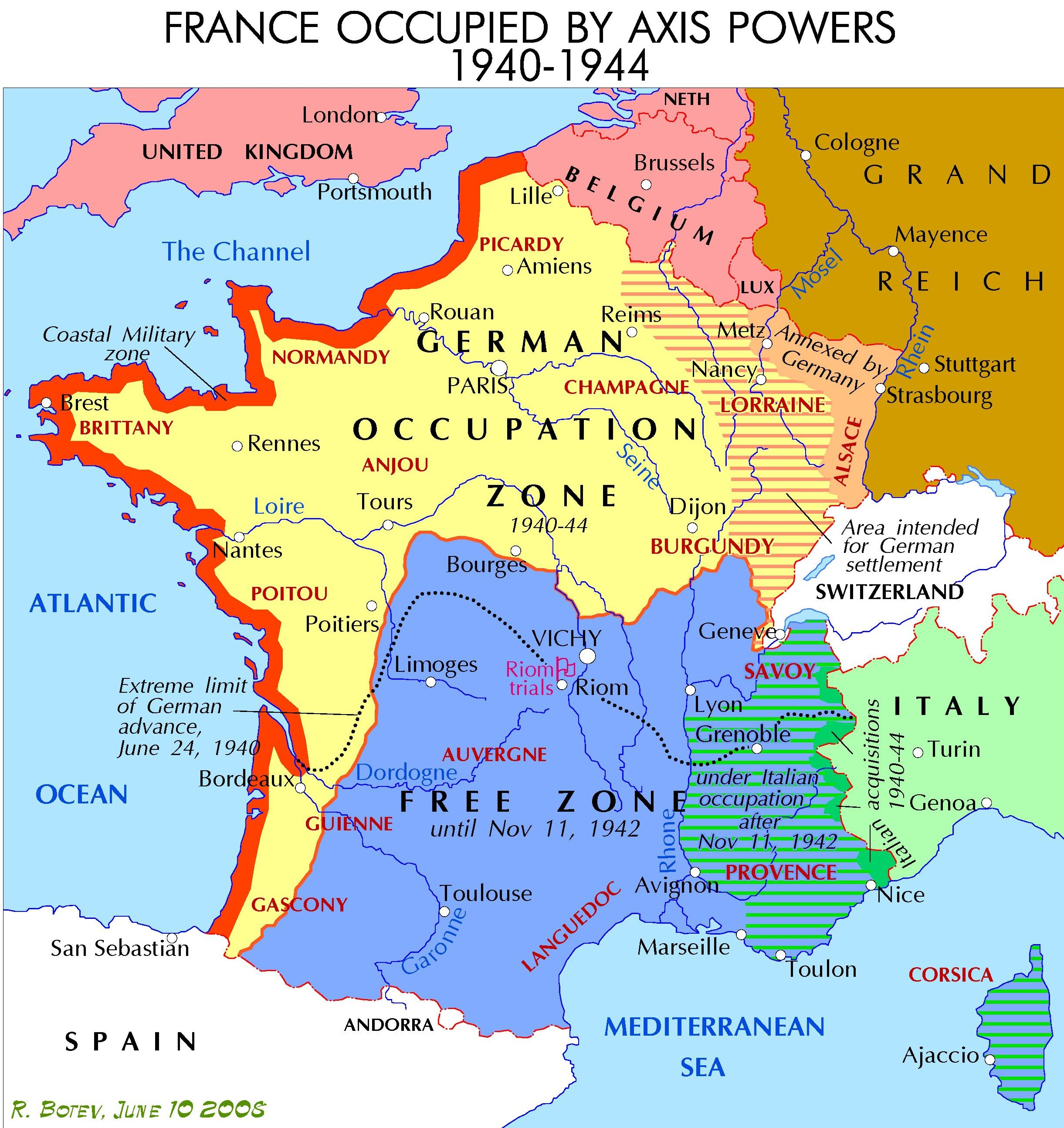
Vichy France is the "Free Zone" on this map.

With the evacuation from Dunkirk and the surrender of France to Nazi Germany in 1940, many British soldiers and airmen were stranded in occupied Europe. In Paris, Lindell decided that she and her three children would help the soldiers and airmen escape occupied France to unoccupied Vichy France. Through a friend, she found a farm near Sauveterre-de-Béarn which straddled the boundary between occupied France and unoccupied France. Living in nearby Mauléon-Licharre was a retired British officer, Major William Higgins, who was willing to help British soldiers slip across the nearby border to safety in neutral Spain. Lindell, her children, and Michele Cambards, teenage girlfriend of her son Oky, began escorting soldiers and airmen by train from Paris to Sauveterre. Later she shifted operations to Ruffec, a more accessible location. The people she escorted across the border into Vichy France were subsequently helped to return to the United Kingdom by the Pat O'Leary escape line and the Seaman's mission of Donald Caskie in Marseille.

Lindell, her family, and her associates may have assisted about 25 English and 50 French men to escape capture by the Germans in 1940. However, her luck ran out in early 1941 when the Abwehr police arrested her in Paris and she was sentenced to 9 months in prison. At about the same time, her son Maurice was arrested and sentenced to 11 months in prison. After Lindell was released in November 1941, she returned to Ruffec and adopted the code names "Marie" and "Marie-Claire", thus the "Marie-Claire" line. Afraid of being rearrested, she soon crossed the border into Vichy France. George Whittington, an American Vice Consul in Lyon, France, obtained for Lindell an exit visa from Vichy, describing her as a "stranded English governess." In July 1942, Lindell arrived safely in London.

== Return to France ==
In London, Lindell applied to return to France with MI9, the British escape and evasion organization. MI9 was skeptical. MI9 officer, James Langley said of her, "Mary was a very brave, courageous woman who wanted to have everything her own way...she was, to put it mildly, difficult...she wouldn't obey any instructions given by us" Nevertheless, Lindell was accepted and became one of two female agents sent to Europe by MI9, the other being Trix Terwindt who was sent to the Netherlands. Lindell was trained by MI9 in clandestine techniques and returned to France via Westland Lysander airplane in October 1942, landing near Ussel, Corrèze. Based in Ruffec, she sat up operations of the Marie-Clair escape line once again. However, in December she was badly injured and nearly died when an automobile crashed into the bicycle she was riding. Ill, bandaged, and with her arm still in a sling, she assisted two of the best known escapees of World War II: Herbert Hasler and Bill Sparks, the "Cockleshell Heroes" and only survivors of Operation Frankton. Sparks commented that "seeing my commanding officer taking orders from a little lady was very humorous for me. But she left us in no doubt that she was the governor."

Misfortune, however, began to impact the flourishing operations of the Marie-Claire Line. In May 1943, Lindell's son and principal helper, Maurice, was arrested in Lyon and tortured. Her daughter Barbé (who was friends with many of the German occupiers of Paris) negotiated a bribe of 60,000 francs for Maurice's release with Klaus Barbie, the notorious Gestapo leader. Lindell's son Oky was arrested soon afterwards, sent to a prison camp, and never heard of again. With a price on her head and the Gestapo on her trail, Lindell adopted a new identity, the "Comtesse de Moncy." She made enemies, refusing to accede to demands by a British intelligence officer that he be evacuated immediately, telling him "this is an escape route for airmen." She also quarreled with one of her guides, Comtesse Pauline Barré de Saint-Venant, code named "Alice Laroche" and "Marie-Odile." As a result of the row with Saint-Venant, Lindell moved her operation from Ruffec to Pau, a city near the border of Spain.

Although statistics are incomplete, the Marie-Claire line is credited with helping about 100 allied airmen escape from occupied France.

== Capture and imprisonment ==
On November 22, 1943, Lindell was arrested at the train station in Pau. She was wearing, as usual, her Red Cross uniform and was awaiting the arrival by train of four airmen whom she planned to send with a guide across the nearby Pyrenees to Spain. In December, Lindell was sent by train to Paris. She attempted to escape by jumping off the train and was shot in the head by a German guard. Taken to a Luftwaffe hospital in Tours a German surgeon operated on her and saved her life. Taken to Dijon in January 1944, she was held, chained and in solitary confinement. However unlike many captives of the Germans she was not tortured.

== Ravensbrück ==
She always thought she knew best. She was an impossible character and disliked by everyone in normal circumstances. But in the camp you needed someone like that.

— Yvonne Baseden, Ravensbruck inmate

In August 1944, with the liberation of France by Allied forces underway, Lindell and three other women were transported to Ravensbrück concentration camp in Germany, arriving there on September 3, 1944.

Two weeks after arriving at Ravensbrück, Lindell was assigned to work in the camp hospital as a nurse. Thus, although working 12 to 14 hours a day, she avoided the grueling labor assigned to most of the women in the prison camp. The doctor in charge of the hospital was SS officer Percy Triete who had an English mother. Lindell said that Triete "behaved very well to me and did all he could for my [English] compatriots." British and American women in Ravensbrück numbered only a few among the tens of thousands of women prisoners, of whom the largest contingent were Poles. From her job at the hospital, Lindell had the opportunity to meet or hear of many of the British and American women and made a list of those imprisoned at Ravensbrück.

In 1945, during the closing months of World War II, a Swedish diplomat, Folke Bernadotte, negotiated with the German government for the release of women prisoners from Ravensbrück and other concentration camps. Hundreds of white buses (painted white to distinguish them from military vehicles and thereby avoid bombing by the Allied air forces), were assembled to collect and transport some prisoners, especially Scandinavians, from the concentration camps to Padborg, Denmark from where the prisoners could travel by sea to neutral Sweden. The Germans initially denied to Bernadotte that any British or American women were in Ravensbrück. They were to be held as hostages to be exchanged for captured German officers. Lindell, ill from pneumonia, claimed that she rose from her hospital bed and confronted the camp commander, SS officer Johann Schwarzhuber. She presented him with her list of 47 prisoners of British and American citizenship or heritage and he acceded to her demand to allow them to leave the camp on the white buses. However, the drama for Lindell was not quite over. As the other women were boarding the white buses, Schwarzhuber told Lindell that she could not go. Percy Triete intervened on her behalf and escorted her onto the last bus to leave Ravensbrück, April 25, 1945, two weeks before Germany surrendered.

Lindell, in her nursing uniform, was identified in Swedish news film showing her directing her fellow liberated inmates.

== Ravensbrück trials ==
After the war, 38 Germans who worked at Ravensbrück were charged with war crimes. Twenty-one of those charged were women. At the Ravensbrück Trial, Percival Treite, the half-English medical doctor at Ravensbrück, was among those charged. A dozen former female prisoners, including Lindell, wrote letters to the court favorable to Triete. Lindell testified in favor of Treite at the trial saying that Treite "was the only man who was human, the only man who looked after the sick people as a doctor should look after them." She also criticized the judge advocate, "who was partial and objectionable, had taken on the cross examination of witnesses himself and prevented other questions from being put which might have been [answered] in favour of the accused."

SS officer Percy Treite was sentenced to death. He committed suicide in prison on 8 April 1947.

== Le Foulon's research ==
In 2015, Marie-Laure Le Foulon published an account of her research on Lindell based on the work of Corinna von List and information provided by Anise Postel-Vienay, both members of the French Resistance. Lindell was accused of being SS officer Percy Treite's lover. He was 33 years old in 1945; she was 49 years old. Allegations that she was a "double agent" were debunked by Lindell's biographer and historian Peter Hore. In a television interview, Hore called the allegation that Lindell was a German agent "complete nonsense."

The French Resistance was riddled with rivalries and back-biting. Hore commented that Lindell resisted the German occupation of France for more than four years unlike many of her critics who joined the resistance only when it became clear that Germany was losing the war.

== Film and television ==
The 1991 film One Against the Wind starred Judy Davis, and was based on the biography Story of Mary Lindell: Wartime Secret Agent by Barry Wynne. Lindell was featured in Women of Courage, a television series about four women who defied the Nazis, produced by Peter Morley, himself a German Jewish refugee. The other women were Maria Rutkiewicz, a Polish woman; Sigrid Helliesen Lund, a Norwegian; and Hiltgunt Zassenhaus, a German.

== See also ==
- Comet line - World War II evasion line
- Escape and evasion lines (World War II)
- Nacht und Nebel
- Albert Guérisse - "Pat" O'Leary
- Pat O'Leary Line, evasion line
- Elsie Maréchal

== Works ==
- The Royal Air Forces Escaping Society (1994)
- "M.P. To Fight For Ex-Internees" The Times, 17 July 1963, p. 6
- Marie-Laure Le Folon (2015) Lady mensonges, Mary Lindell, fausse héroïne de la Résistance, Paris, Alma Éditeur, ISBN 978-2362791499
- The last of the Cockleshell Heroes, William Sparks with Michael Munn, ISBN 0 85052 297 8
- Barry Wynne (1961) No Drums No Trumpets, London: Arthur Barker Limited.
