= Harold Parsons =

British Army officer

Major-General Sir Harold Parsons KCMG CB
- Born: 3 July 1863
- Died: 13 February 1925 (aged 61)
- Military career
- Allegiance: United Kingdom
- Branch: British Army
- Service years: 1882–1923
- Rank: Major-General
- Conflicts: Third Anglo-Burmese War; Second Boer War; First World War
- Awards: Knight Commander of the Order of St Michael and St George; Companion of the Order of the Bath

Major-General Sir Harold Daniel Edmund Parsons KCMG CB (3 July 1863 – 13 February 1925) was a British Army officer.

== Military career ==
Parsons was commissioned into the Queen's Royal Regiment (West Surrey) as a lieutenant on 10 May 1882. He saw active service during the Third Anglo-Burmese War in 1885, was promoted to captain on 12 April 1891, and to major on 29 September 1898.

After transfer as an ordnance officer in April 1900, he served in South Africa during the Second Boer War. Staying in South Africa after the end of the war (June 1902), he left Cape Town for Southampton on the SS Staffordshire in January 1903.

He also served in the First World War, being promoted to honorary major general on 1 January 1917, and then became principal ordnance officer in 1920 before retiring in 1923.

Parsons was appointed colonel commandant of the Royal Army Ordnance Corps on 18 October 1924, four months before his death in February 1925, aged 61.

== Namesake ==
Parsons Barracks at Donnington near Telford, Shropshire was named for him.
