= MOD Donnington =

British military base

- Donnington, Telford, Shropshire in England
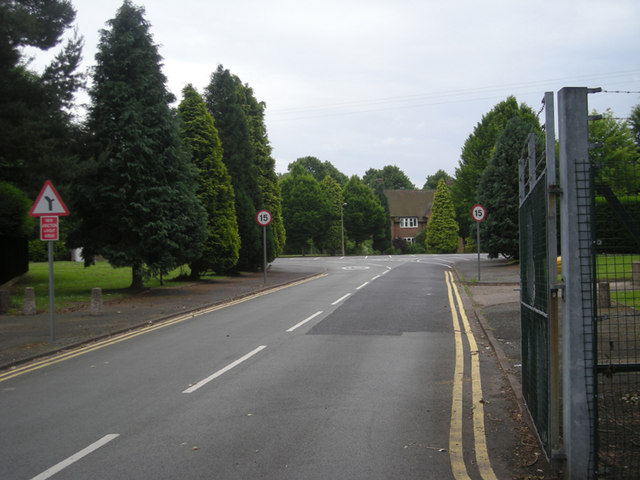
- Entrance to Venning Barracks

Site information
- Type: Barracks; Logistics centre
- Owner: Ministry of Defence

Location
- Shown within Shropshire
- Coordinates: 52.72182°N 2.44415°W

Site history
- In use: 1936–Present; 2017–Present (Defence Fulfilment Centre)

Garrison information
- Occupants: 174 Provost Company, RMP

MOD Donnington is a Ministry of Defence site that consists of a British Army barracks and the Defence Fulfilment Centre, and is situated to the north of Donnington, Telford, Shropshire.

== History ==
The site was chosen in 1936 as one of a number of less vulnerable locations for storing ordnance and other military equipment previously kept at London's Woolwich Arsenal. This was designed to provide employment in what was then a depressed area, following the closure of the Lilleshall Company's New Yard engineering works in St George's several years earlier.

Development from greenfield site begun in 1939, during 1940 the depot was established and at the end of the year Brigadier Charles Esmond de Wolff was appointed commandant and garrison commander. During 1941–1942, the depot increased significantly in size, and at the end of 1941, 9,600 all ranks worked on the site. Brigadier de Wolff also convinced Wellington District Council to build housing for the civilian staff, many of whom had moved from Woolwich. Eventually 1,500 houses were built outside the COD.

By 1980, COD Donnington (along with COD Bicester) was one of just two remaining Central Ordnance Depots overseen by the Royal Army Ordnance Corps; nevertheless, in the 1970s and 80s, it grew to be one of the largest military store complexes in Europe. It remains in use as a storage depot, although the complex was scaled back following two serious fires (in 1983 and 1988).

At the turn of the millennium, further investment took place as Parsons Barracks (named after Major-General Sir Harold Parsons) and Venning Barracks (named after General Sir Walter Venning) were developed.

The base housed the Historic Weapons Collection until it moved to Maldon, Essex in 2010.

In March 2014, there was reason for local optimism that MoD Donnington would once more be radically expanded, with another 500 to 700 jobs being added to the 1,000 jobs that MoD Donnington then currently required. The expansion plans were approved early that month.

In 2015, Donnington was selected as the site for a new 'Defence Fulfilment Centre' for the newly privatised Logistics, Commodities and Services element of Defence Equipment and Support. The new office and warehouse buildings were built alongside the former Defence Storage Distribution Centre on the site and opened in early 2017.

In November 2014, Venning Barracks became headquarters of the newly-formed 11th Signal Brigade and Headquarters West Midlands, formed by the amalgamation of 11th Signal Brigade who were already based here since 1992, and the hitherto Shrewsbury-headquartered 143rd (West Midlands) Regional Brigade.

In September 2016, it was announced Parsons and Venning Barracks were among 13 sites named by the Ministry of Defence for future disposal.

In April 2025, it was disclosed that MOD Donnington "acts as a collection centre for redundant equipment containing radioactive material, principally both in-service and redundant equipment containing gaseous tritium light sources, electrodeposited nickel-63 sources, and legacy equipment containing radium luminised components."

== Defence Fulfilment Centre ==
The Defence Fulfilment Centre (DFC) is owned by the Ministry of Defence (MOD) and operated by Defence Equipment and Support (DE&S), the procurement arm of the MOD. The DFC ensures kit and equipment reaches the British Armed Forces. The 860,000 sq ft facility consists of two warehouses and a support building, and also contains an industrial-sized fridge. This fridge is specifically for medicines and plays a crucial role in ensuring personnel receive them when needed.

During the COVID-19 pandemic, over 6,800 ventilators were distributed from the DFC. The DFC also enabled British military personnel to deliver Personal Protective Equipment (PPE) and vaccines to hospitals.

In 2022, the DFC supplied the Ukrainian Army with 84,000 surplus Mk 7 helmets.

== Future ==
In November 2016, the Ministry of Defence announced that the Parsons and Venning Barracks sites would close, with an "Estimated Date of Disposal" in 2020. This was later extended to 2030.

== Current units ==
- Defence Fulfilment Centre
- 174 Provost Company, Royal Military Police

== See also ==
- MOD Bicester
