= Charles Esmond de Wolff =

British Army officer

Brigadier Charles Esmond de Wolff CB CBE

Commandant, Central Ordnance Depot Donnington
- In office 1940–?

Personal details
- Born: 25 November 1893
- Died: 12 October 1986 (aged 92) Malta

Brigadier Charles Esmond de Wolff CB CBE (25 November 1893 − 12 October 1986) was a British Army officer.

== Military career ==
De Wolff was commissioned second lieutenant in the Royal Sussex Regiment (Territorial Force) in 1914 and served throughout the First World War. He transferred to the Army Ordnance Department (later the Royal Army Ordnance Corps) as a temporary lieutenant in August 1915 and was promoted acting captain in October 1916. He served in the Gallipoli campaign and then with the British Salonika Force from 1916 to 1918, for which he was mentioned in despatches in November 1918 and appointed Officer of the Order of the British Empire (OBE) in January 1919, by which time he was a temporary captain and acting major. He was badly burned by an explosion in July 1916 while in Salonika which hospitalised him for three months and left him with lifelong deafness.

In 1919 he was appointed Assistant Director of Ordnance Services (ADOS) in South Russia during the Russian Civil War and was promoted acting lieutenant-colonel in February 1919. For his service in this campaign he was appointed Commander of the Order of the British Empire (CBE) in November 1919 for having expedited a successful mission to rescue Grand Duchess Olga Alexandrovna of Russia (sister of Tsar Nicholas II and cousin of George V of the United Kingdom) from Bolshevik occupied Crimea. He also received the Russian Order of St Vladimir.

He was promoted substantive captain, acting major and acting ordnance officer 3rd class in April 1920, but reverted to the rank of captain and the grade of ordnance officer 4th class in February 1921. He was promoted substantive major and ordnance officer 3rd class in April 1929, substantive lieutenant-colonel and ordnance officer 2nd class in March 1936.

In March 1939 he relinquished the appointment of ADOS Malta and was selected as the project officer to set up Central Ordnance Depot Donnington (COD Donnington). This was a major new depot established to manage and hold the Army's technical and warlike stores (weapons, communications, radar, engineer items and similar items) near Wellington, Shropshire. It not only reflected the need to create a depot to support a vital stores range of the rapidly mechanising Army but also to replace inadequate and vulnerable storage in Woolwich. After a short sojourn in France as an ADOS at General Headquarters he returned in November 1939 and was promoted colonel and ordnance officer 1st class in the same month.

His drive and experience grew the depot from a greenfield site in 1939. During 1940 the depot was established and at the end of the year de Wolff was appointed commandant and garrison commander with the rank of brigadier. During 1941 and 1942 the depot increased significantly in size and at the end of 1941, 9,600 all ranks worked on the site. He also convinced Wellington District Council to build housing for the civilian staff, many of whom had moved from Woolwich. Eventually 1,500 houses were built outside the COD.

Towards the end of the war, de Wolff "moved to an important but less exacting appointment as DDOS on the Lines of Communication in Italy. But by then the main difficulties had been overcome and to him must go the credit for this great achievement."

He was appointed Companion of the Order of the Bath (CB) in the 1945 New Year Honours and retired in July 1946 with the honorary rank of brigadier.

== Personal and later life ==
He spent the rest of his life in Malta. An active freemason, he was district grand master of the English District Grand Lodge of Malta until April 1977. He married Ada Marjorie Arnold in 1920.
