= Dick Raikes =

British naval officer

Lieutenant Commander Dick Raikes
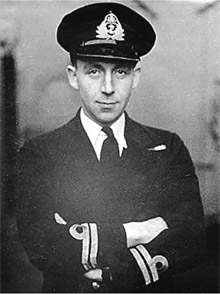
- Lieutenant Commander Dick Raikes
- Born: 21 January 1912; London, England
- Died: 24 May 2005 (aged 93); Semley, Wiltshire, England
- Relatives: Admiral Sir Robert Henry Taunton Raikes (uncle); Vice Admiral Sir Iwan Geoffrey Raikes (cousin) Raymond Raikes (cousin).
- Military career
- Allegiance: United Kingdom
- Branch: Royal Navy
- Service years: 1925–1946
- Rank: Lieutenant commander
- Commands: HMS L26; HMS Tribune (N76); HMS Seawolf (47S); HMS Tuna (N94)
- Awards: Distinguished Service Order

Lieutenant Commander Richard Prendergast Raikes DSO (21 January 1912 – 24 May 2005) was an officer in the Royal Navy notable for being the commanding officer of the submarine HMS Tuna that launched the canoes during Operation Frankton in 1942. His part in the operation was portrayed in the 1955 war film The Cockleshell Heroes where he was fictionalised as "Alan Greaves", played by Christopher Lee.

== Early childhood ==
Raikes was born in London, one of five children of Major Lawrence Taunton Raikes, an Indian Army officer. Until his parents returned from India when he was ten, he was brought up in Wales by his grandparents and three aunts. His aunts had seven brothers who had been awarded eight DSOs and four MCs in First World War; two had died, one had become a general and another had become an admiral.

== Early naval career ==
Raikes entered Dartmouth aged thirteen in 1925; he became Chief Cadet Captain and was awarded the King's dirk. He served in the battleship HMS Warspite as a midshipman when she was based in Malta. Whilst there he used to rise at dawn to exercise Lord Louis Mountbatten's ponies. He was promoted to sub-lieutenant on 16 January 1933 but in the same year the 'bullshit' of the gunnery course at HMS Excellent on Whale Island made him determined to only serve in small ships without guns. He attended submarine training at HMS Dolphin in Gosport later that year and served in HMS L22, HMS Clyde, HMS H32 and HMS Severn before the war. He was promoted to lieutenant on 16 March 1935 and was present the same year at the Fleet Review for King George V's Silver Jubilee off Spithead whilst serving in the newly built River-class submarine HMS Clyde. Clyde sailed to the Mediterranean and was present in Palestine during the Arab general strike. During this time Raikes, after a couple of hours shunting practice at Haifa station, was in command of an armoured train, keeping the line to Samakh open despite ambushes and derailments. On one night he joined the Trans-Jordan Frontier Force and rode his horse at full gallop across the country by the light of a burning oil pipeline. He returned to Malta and became first lieutenant of the submarine HMS Severn.

Raikes passed his 'Perisher' course in 1940 and in September 1941 took command of HMS Seawolf which was sent to Polyarnoe in the Arctic, where he remained for a year. On patrol in March 1942 Raikes sighted the German battleship Tirpitz: he was too far away to attack, but his enemy-locating report enabled the carrier Victorious to attack with her Albacore torpedo-bombers. On the same patrol, Raikes heard the propeller noise of a U-boat surfacing and carried out an attack with his stern torpedoes; there was an explosion and black smoke, but no wreckage was found. 'For daring enterprise and devotion to duty in successful patrols in H.M. Submarine Seawolf' Raikes was awarded the DSO.

== Operation Frankton ==
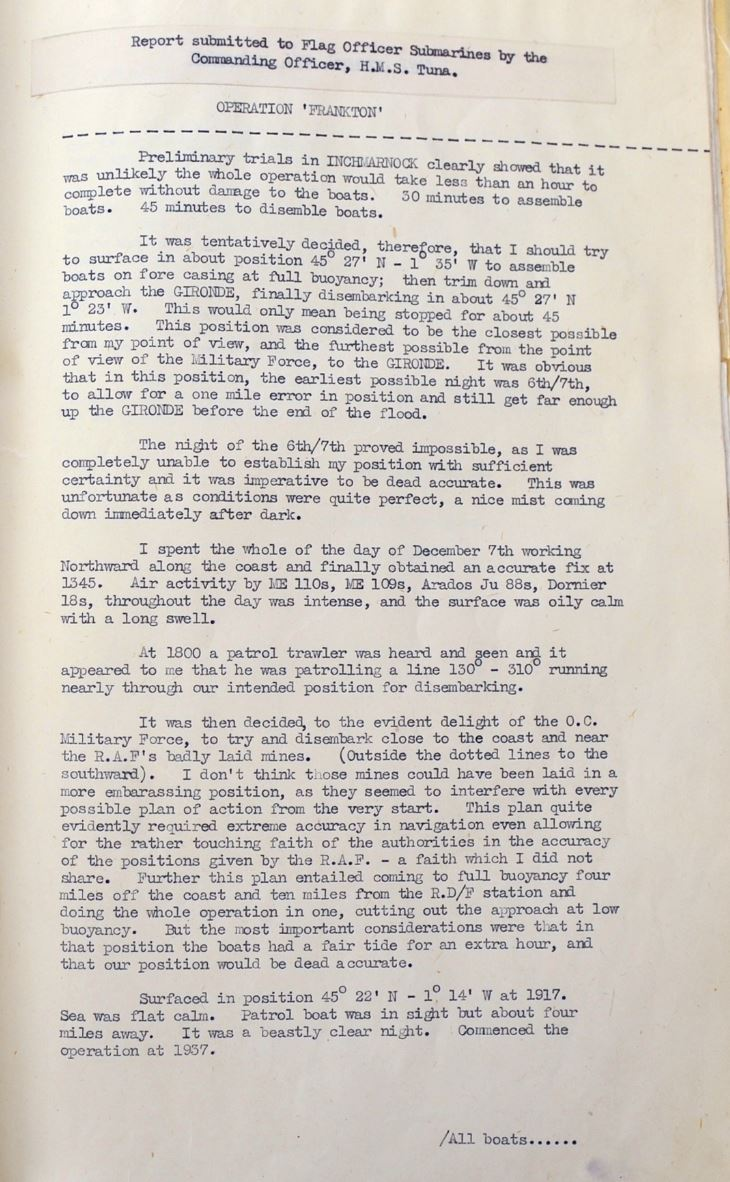
The first page of Raikes's post-operational report for Op Frankton

Raikes became commanding officer of HMS Tuna on 24 August 1942. On 26 November 1942, orders were prepared for Raikes's part in Operation Frankton. These orders stated that a "small party of approximately twelve officers and men will be disembarked from the submarine in the vicinity of the mouth of the Gironde estuary. The party will paddle up to the Bassen-Bordeaux area in Cockles Mark II, where they will carry out a limpet attack on the blockade runners in the port". His orders continued laconically, "The party will escape overland to Spain".

On 30 November 1942 in Holy Loch, Tuna embarked thirteen Royal Marines from the Boom Patrol Detachment and Raikes received his orders, sailing south on passage to the Bay of Biscay.

On the evening of 7 December 1942, Raikes navigated HMS Tuna his way underwater through a fishing fleet and an RAF minefield before deciding to run a serious risk by moving the canoe launch point two miles south into the mouth of the Gironde. When Tuna broke surface in the calm water, Raikes was first on the bridge to check that he had a better view than the enemy. Canoe Cachalot was damaged but the other five canoes were launched successfully. Raikes recorded in his post-operational report, "2022 waved 'au revoir' to a magnificent bunch of black faced villains with whom it has been a real pleasure to work, and, withdrew to the south and west".

== Late Second World War ==
From 1943 to 1945 Raikes was a member of the personal staffs of the C-in-C Coastal Command, Air Marshal Jack Slessor, and Air Marshal Sholto Douglas. He was promoted to lieutenant commander on 16 March 1943. He attended the Trend committee which oversaw the U-boat war. He then commanded the captured U-3514 and a group of similar U-boats during Operation Deadlight, the scuttling by the Royal Navy of surrendered boats.

== Post-War ==
Raikes was medically discharged from the Royal Navy in 1946. He initially wanted to go into the hotel trade but eventually took up a job in the publicity department of Marconi, where he worked from 1947 to 1972. From 1972 he resided in the village of North Curry, Somerset.

== Personal life ==
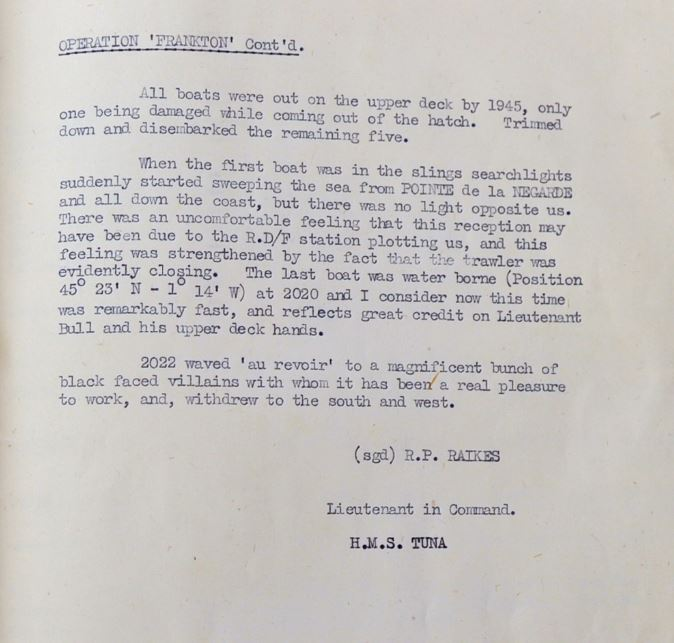
Second page of Raikes's Op Frankton report – "....waved 'au revoir' to a magnificent bunch of black faced villains...."

Raikes married Joan Margaret Edgington in 1938. She once took passage in HMS Tuna from Holy Loch to Arrochar. The couple had three daughters. His wife and one daughter predeceased him. Two of his daughters are still living. Raikes's uncle was Admiral Sir Robert Raikes. His cousins were Vice Admiral Sir Iwan Raikes who became Flag Officer Submarines and Raymond Raikes the producer and director. Philanthropist Robert Raikes was also a forebear. While some of his family remained in England, many of his offspring now reside in Canada and the United States.
