= Riggal Papers =

Notes on training of WW2 intelligence agents

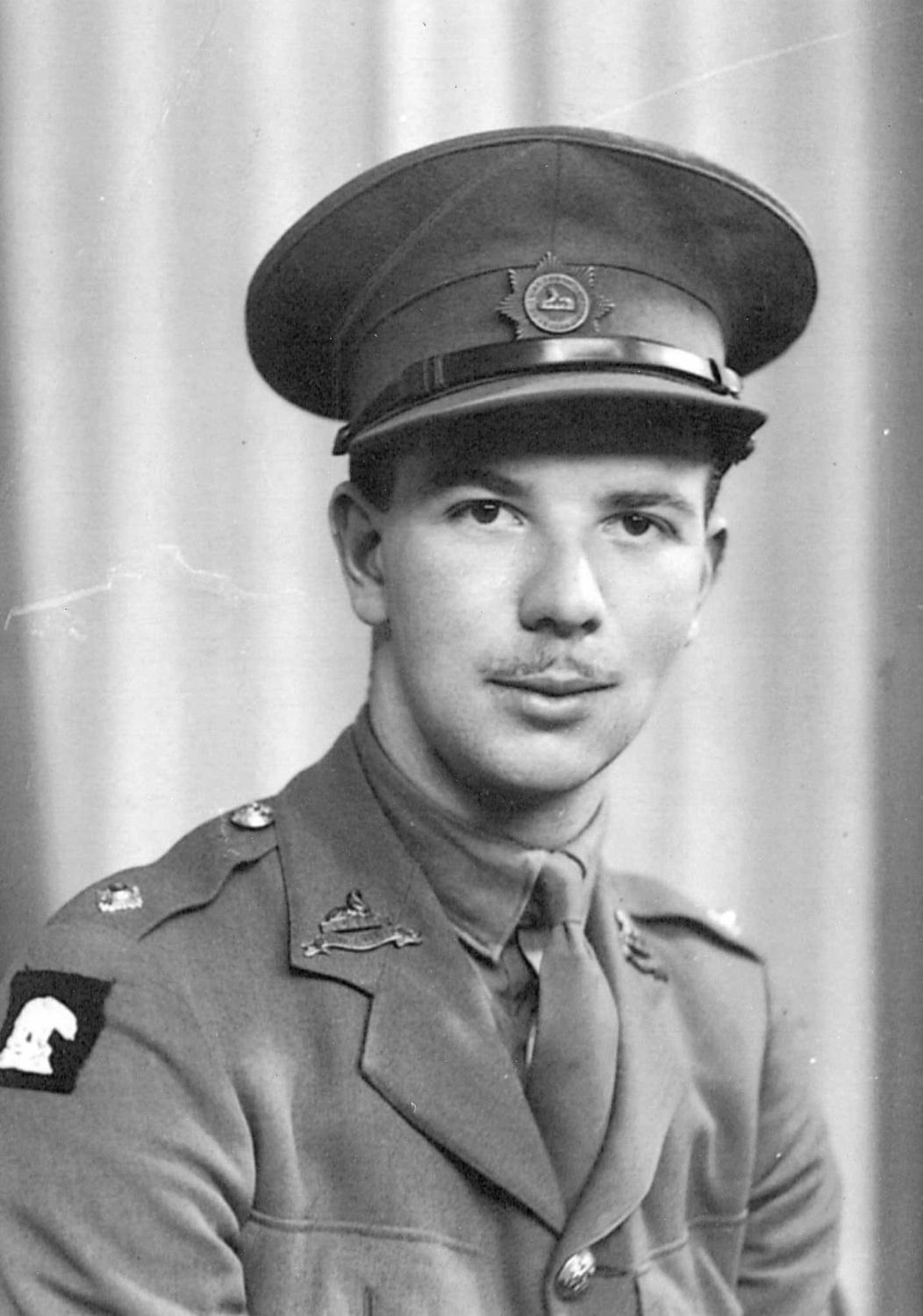
Captain P M Riggal

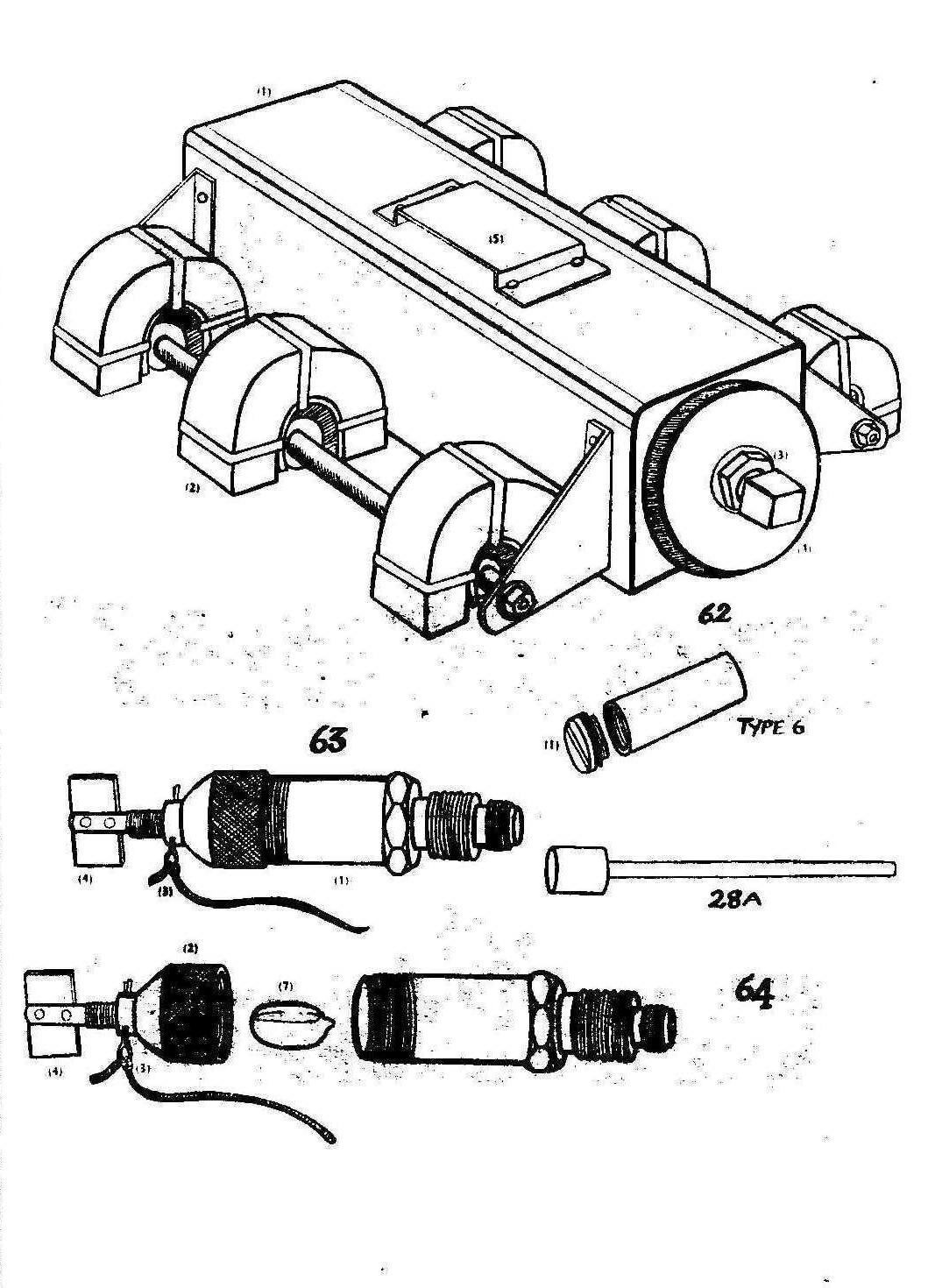
Training diagram showing explosive charges

Captain Peter Miles Riggal served with the Lincolnshire Regiment and was an expert in the use of explosives. He was recruited by SOE and worked as an instructor. Later in the war he was attached to Force 136 in the Far East, and instructed agents who were to be dropped into Japan to destroy key targets during the planned invasion of Japan. Their skills were not put into use as the war with Japan was ended by the use of the atom bomb.

His Instructors notes and training information should have been destroyed at the end of the war. However, Riggal kept the notes, and they were forgotten for many years. The papers give a comprehensive insight into what agents were taught in the desperate war years. Amongst the items are a series of school exercise books with his notes on training sessions including assessments of trainee agents. Also there is a large amount of information on codes, disguises, explosive tests, interrogation techniques and many other training aids. They are on display at the Combined Military Services Museum in Maldon, Essex.
