= MS Tannenfels =

World War II German cargo ship

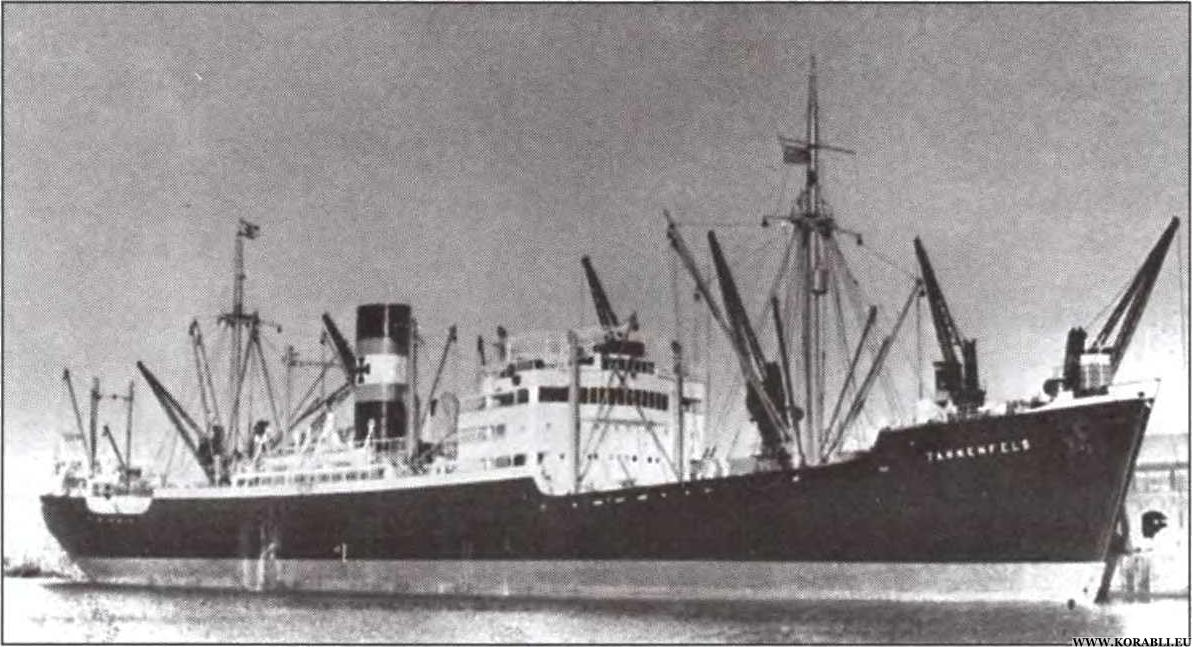
- Tannenfels in 1938

History

Germany
- Name: Tannenfels
- Owner: DDG Hansa
- Port of registry: Bremen, Germany
- Launched: 9 April 1938
- Commissioned: 11 June 1938
- Fate: Scuttled in 1944 as a blockship in La Gironde

General characteristics
- Tonnage: 7,840 GRT; 4,833 NRT; 10,663 DWT
- Length: 155.47 m LOA
- Beam: 18.69 m
- Draught: 8.26 m
- Installed power: 7,600 hp (5,590 kW)
- Propulsion: 2 × 6-cylinder double-acting diesel engines
- Speed: 16 knots
- Crew: 45
- Armament: 37mm and 20mm machine guns;1 15 cm SK C/28
- Notes: Fought with Stier in her last battle, lightly damaged

MS Tannenfels was a German cargo ship owned by DDG Hansa, put into service in 1938. She served as a blockade runner during World War II.

When the war broke out in 1939, Tannenfels was at Kismayo, in Italian Somaliland. She remained there until January 1941, when British troops entered Italian Somaliland. She then sailed for Europe via the Cape of Good Hope, eventually reaching German-occupied France.

She was taken over by the Kriegsmarine and commissioned as an auxiliary naval vessel. She was fitted with machine guns and some larger naval guns for self-defense. During the next year and a half, she was employed as a blockade runner, slipping past British patrols to deliver supplies to German armed merchant cruisers at sea. In December 1942 at Bordeaux, she was damaged by limpet mines placed by British commandos (Operation Frankton), and was no longer seaworthy. She was eventually scuttled as a blockship in the Gironde River in 1944.
