= Cockle Mark II canoe =

British canoe used in World War II

The Cockle Mark II was a type of canoe used by the Royal Navy during World War 2.

== Surviving example ==
The Combined Military Services Museum in Maldon, Essex houses the only surviving original Cockle Mark II kayak used by the Royal Marine Raiders on Operation Frankton, commonly known as the Cockleshell Heroes. The canoe is believed to be ‘Cachalot’ damaged during the launching of the canoes from the submarine, and returned to the Saro Works boat yard on the Isle of Wight for repair. However, production of the kayak had moved to Parkstone Joinery in Dorset, and so the canoe was never repaired. The kayak was restored by the museum, using original plans and sketches made by the designer Goatley, and the raid commander Halser. Copies of some of this paperwork can be viewed alongside the canoe.

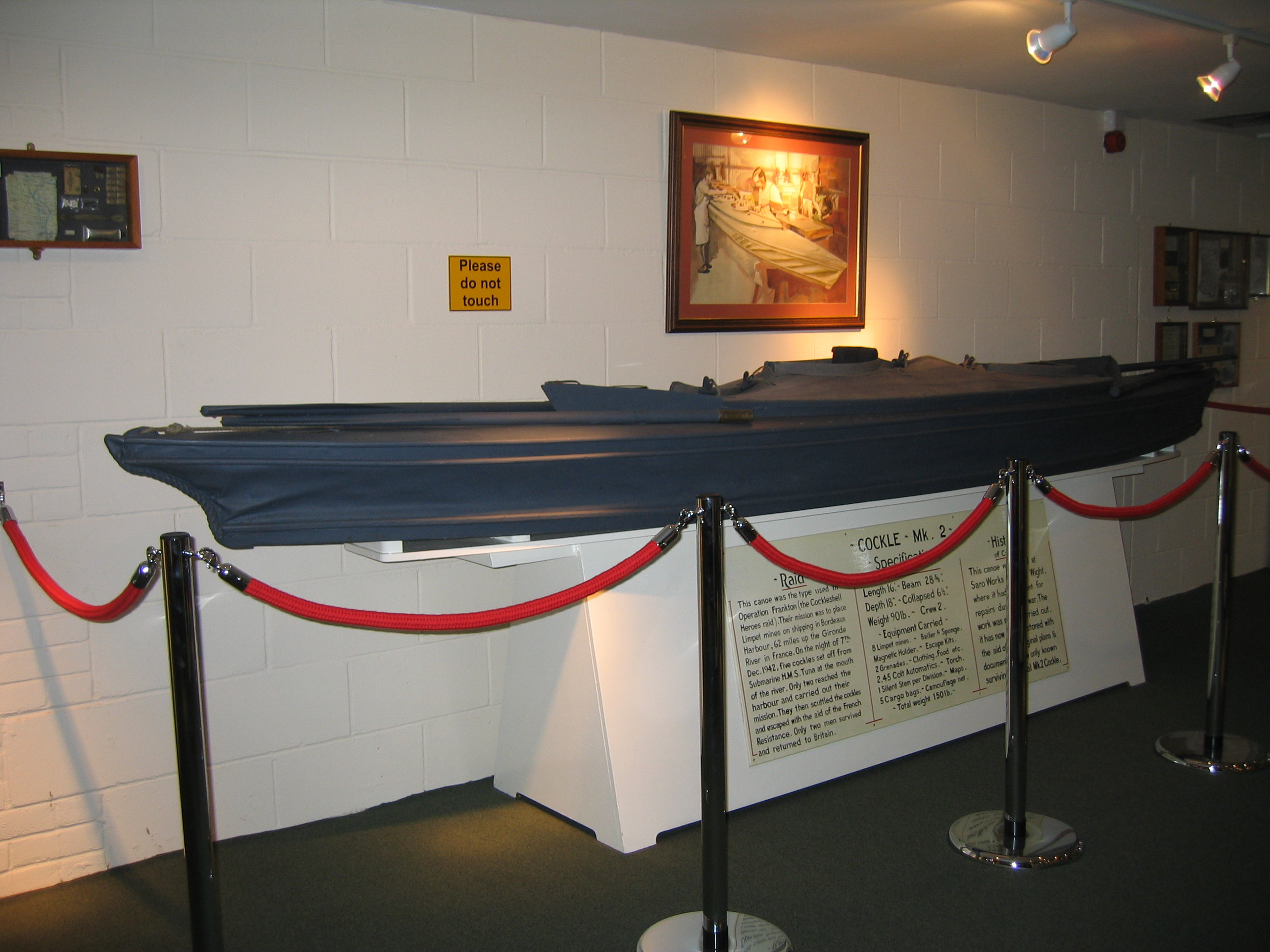
Cockle Mark II kayak
