= The Cockleshell Heroes =

1955 British film by José Ferrer

- US cinema poster
- Directed by: José Ferrer
- Screenplay by: Bryan Forbes; Richard Maibaum
- Based on: Cockleshell Heroes; 1951 Reader's Digest story by George Kent
- Produced by: Phil C. Samuel
- Starring: José Ferrer; Trevor Howard, Christopher Lee
- Cinematography: John Wilcox
- Edited by: Alan Osbiston
- Music by: John Addison
- Production company: Warwick Films
- Distributed by: Columbia Pictures
- Release date: 16 November 1955 (UK)
- Running time: 97 minutes
- Country: United Kingdom
- Language: English
- Box office: $200,000 (Germany)

The Cockleshell Heroes is a 1955 British Technicolor war film with Trevor Howard, Anthony Newley, Christopher Lee, David Lodge and José Ferrer, who also directed. The film depicts a heavily fictionalised version of Operation Frankton, the December 1942 raid on German cargo shipping by British Royal Marines Commandos, who infiltrated Bordeaux Harbour using folding kayaks.

It was the first Warwick Film to be filmed in CinemaScope. The producer, Cubby Broccoli, went on to produce films about a famous fictional commander of the Royal Navy in the James Bond franchise.

It was one of the top British box office hits of 1956.

== Plot ==
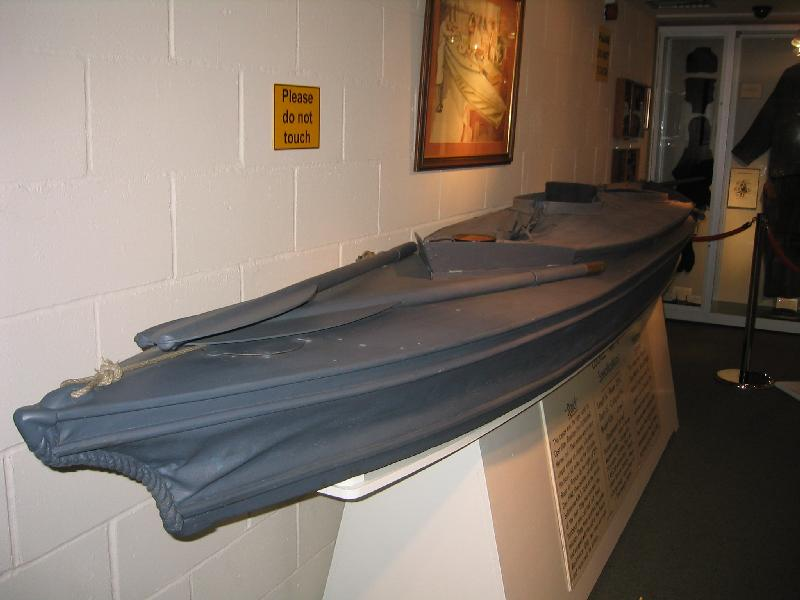
Original cockleshell canoe

In the Second World War, newly promoted Major Stringer of the Royal Marines devises a novel idea for a raid. By using collapsible canoes, he believes it is possible for commandos to reach an enemy-held harbour undetected and blow up ships with limpet mines. He is given command of a small group of volunteers. However, he clashes with his veteran second-in-command, the cynical, by-the-book Captain Hugh Thompson. The two officers represent the clash of cultures in the Royal Marines in the Second World War and postwar. Stringer, a temporary wartime officer, is the enthusiastic promoter of commando operations requiring daring and initiative, but has no experience leading men or operations. Thompson, an embittered middle-aged regular captain who has been repeatedly passed over for promotion after failing to take an objective in the First World War, represents the old guard of traditional ship's detachments. Sergeant Craig trains the men following Stringer's directions, but Thompson strongly disapproves of his commander's lax methods. When a test mission ends disastrously, Stringer admits his mistake and turns to Thompson, who soon whips the marines into shape.

Ruddock, one of the men, goes AWOL due to marital problems. Thompson gets to Ruddock's wife first and finds her with her civilian lover, but leaves when they both insult him. He goes to the local pub for a drink and finds the missing Marine. Thompson gives Ruddock enough time to beat up his wife's paramour, then drives him back to camp.

The raid is launched soon afterwards by submarine in HMS Tuna under the command of Lieutenant-Commander Alan Greaves. As the submarine carrying the canoeists arrives off the Gironde estuary, a depth charge attack by a passing German patrol boat knocks out Ruddock's partner. Thompson, who was not supposed to go on the raid, volunteers to take his place. The commandos are inserted into the sea close to the mouth of the Gironde river in their Cockle Mk II collapsible canoes as Greaves resubmerges and HMS Tuna disappears. The raiders then disembark and begin their attack. Facing fantastic hazards, they paddle 70 miles of arduous paddling upriver. After moving by night and hiding by day, only four men reach the target, where they plant limpet mines on a number of German cargo ships. All this takes place during harsh December weather. The raid is successful, but only two men, Stringer and Clarke manage to escape. Four, including Thompson and Ruddock, are captured while the other four are killed on the way to the docks. When Thompson and the other prisoners refuse to divulge what their mission was, they are shot by firing squad, just as the mines explode. Stringer and Clarke walk away, accompanied by apparitions of Thompson and those lost.

== Cast ==
- José Ferrer as Major Stringer RM
- Trevor Howard as Captain Hugh Thompson RM
- Christopher Lee as Lieutenant-Commander Alan Greaves, the submarine commander, based on Dick Raikes
- Dora Bryan as Myrtle
- Victor Maddern as Sergeant Craig RM
- Anthony Newley as Marine Clarke
- David Lodge as Marine George Ruddock
- Peter Arne as Corporal Stevens RM
- Percy Herbert as Marine Ted Lomas
- Graham Stewart as Marine Inness
- John Fabian as Marine Cooney
- John Van Eyssen as Marine Bradley
- Robert Desmond as Marine Paddy Todd
- Walter Fitzgerald as the Gestapo Commandant
- Karel Stepanek as Assistant Gestapo Officer
- Beatrice Campbell as Mrs Ruddock
- Sydney Tafler as Policeman
- Gladys Henson as Barmaid
- Jacques B. Brunius as French Fisherman
- Andreas Malandrinos as French Fisherman
- Judith Furse as WVS driver
- Patric Doonan as Sailor Claridge
- Sam Kydd as fish lorry driver (uncredited)
- Yana as Pub Singer (uncredited)
- John Blythe as Lodger (uncredited)

== Development ==
In 1953, it was reported that the Australian author Hugh Hastings was working on a script called "Cockleshell Heroes" for the star Gregory Peck and the director Lewis Milestone. The script was based on a Reader's Digest account of the mission by George Kent.

Film rights to the story eventually went to Warwick Films, a new production company based in Britain run by the American producers Albert Broccoli, who would later produce many James Bond films, and Irving Allen. Warwick's first film had been The Red Beret, based on a real-life British commando raid in the Second World War, with an American star in the lead role. It was very popular; The Cockleshell Heroes followed the same formula. It was the company's fourth movie.

It was the first independent film shot in Britain to use CinemaScope. Warwick had secured the use of the process for Cockleshell and A Prize of Arms.

=== Casting ===
Alan Ladd had appeared in Warwick's first three films, and was discussed as a possible star. So too was Richard Widmark who ended up making A Prize of Gold for the company instead. When the British Admiralty was approached to co-operate it requested that Spencer Tracy play the lead.

Eventually, José Ferrer was signed to star, with Terence Young to direct. Young arrived in Hollywood in October 1954 to discuss the film with Ferrer. At the time, Ferrer was considered a film star having appeared in the popular Moulin Rouge. He was also a renowned theatre director and had just directed his first feature, The Shrike (1955). By January 1955, it was announced that Ferrer would direct as well as star in The Cockleshell Heroes. His fee was a reported $150,000 plus a percentage of the profits.

=== Script ===
The script was written by Bryan Forbes who was better known at the time as an actor. Forbes had been writing a lot of short stories and journalistic pieces, and had done some uncredited work on the screenplay for Warwick's The Black Knight. Forbes later said, "I got the reputation as a fast man with a pen, and as a result of that I got my first real screenplay assignment for Cockleshell Heroes."

Ferrer had Forbes's script rewritten by Richard Maibaum, who had worked on several Warwick movies, which Forbes admitted "I didn't appreciate".

== Shooting ==
Filming started in March 1955.

Filming was done in Portugal and at several Royal Marine establishments, with the Commandant-General Royal Marines training the actors for drill and canoe handling. The training camp scenes in the film were shot at Eastney Barracks in Southsea, Hampshire. Many of the barrack buildings seen in the film still exist including the military buildings further up the beach where the scene to dispose of the live explosive device before its fuse time expired was filmed. The Royal Navy ships, HMS Flint Castle and HMS Leeds Castle, were used to portray a German anti-submarine vessel dropping depth charges. This resulted in the ship dropping the first depth charges being seen with F383 on its side but in the next shot it has F384 on the side. The two corvettes were both scrapped shortly after filming (in 1956 and 1958 respectively). Studio scenes were shot at Shepperton.

The limpet mine scenes were filmed in the King George V Docks in North Woolwich and many of the other scenes were filmed on the adjacent bomb sites and at derelict houses in the area. Lieutenant Colonel Herbert "Blondie" Hasler, RM, the leader of the real-life raid, was seconded to Warwick Films as a technical advisor. Ex-Corporal Bill Sparks, the other survivor of the raid, was also an advisor.

"It was not a happy picture at all," said Forbes. "Ferrer was a megalomaniac."

The film briefly uses several railway locations including the level crossing (Military Road) adjacent to Fort Brockhurst railway station on the (by then "goods only") Gosport branch in Hampshire. The station buildings and former platforms survive today as a private residence. As he cycles south, Ferrer has to wait for a passing northbound train (a van hauled by LSWR T9 class locomotive 30729) so he takes the opportunity to abandon his bicycle in favour of a ride in the rear of a fish lorry. Later, Ferrer steals the fish lorry only to abandon it at Shepperton Station (Surrey) in order to catch a just-departing Up train allegedly to Portsmouth, steam train noises being provided on this otherwise electric branch.

In another sequence, David Lodge ducks out of sight into a brick bus shelter alongside the North Woolwich Branch. This was possibly at the footbridge opposite Fernhill Street on Albert Road, west of North Woolwich station. David Lodge is also filmed running over the road bridge adjacent to Chertsey railway station where a Southern electric train can be seen drawing into the Up platform.

The film location where Marine Cooney leaps off a road bridge into a coal wagon (within a Southampton-bound goods train hauled by an LSWR S15 class locomotive) is Chertsey Road, Addlestone, with Egham Hill and Chertsey in the background as well as Addlestone Cemetery beyond the two fields to the left of the railway line. Now numbered the A318, Chertsey Road and this location are almost unrecognisable following road realignments for the building of the A317 St Peter's Way along with subsequent property developments.

Trevor Howard and David Lodge nearly drowned while filming a sequence in a canoe when the canoe overturned.

During production the film was sometimes known as Survivors Two.

The then-famous British singer, Yana (Pamela Guard), is shown in a cameo role as a sweetly-singing blonde Wren (Women's Royal Naval Service member) in a pub scene, shortly before a brawl erupts.

In order to get permission to film in Portugal, Warwick Films had to make a documentary about the country, April in Portugal. This was directed by Euan Lloyd, who worked for Warwick, and featured Howard.

The budget was £267,406 plus fees for Ferrer, Broccoli and Allen.

=== Reshoots ===
Irving Allen decided Maibaum's script did not have enough comedy, so he had Forbes rewrite Maibaum's revision and direct some sequences without telling Ferrer. When Ferrer found out, he left the film.

Forbes later said, "I was responsible for reshooting a great deal of them, without Ferrer's knowledge, because the producers weren't happy with the way it was going." He says these scenes involved Howard and were directed by Allen. Forbes was on set during these which he said "was really valuable training which would serve me well later on" when he became a director.

In August 1955 Irving Allen told the press the unit had been filming for two weeks without Ferrer. He said "When Ferrer finished the film we found that he had made it a tour de force for Joe Ferrer. But he seems to have forgotten about the rest of the cast. He designed the whole picture for himself. So I've been rectifying things. I've been doing close ups of Trevor Howard that Joe forgot to do when he was busy doing close ups of himself." The reshoots also involved filming the blowing up of the German ships.

During filming, the two survivors of the mission told the producers they had no idea what the cargo was in the ships that were destroyed. After the film was completed, Broccoli claimed that the Duke of Edinburgh and Lord Mountbatten told him the contents of the cargo were radar equipment bound for Japan. Broccoli thought this made the story more interesting and had additional sequences shot to be added to the release print. This cost an extra $5,600.

== Reception ==
=== Box office ===
It was one of the ten most popular films at the British box office in 1956. The film performed poorly at the US box office, like most British war movies of this era.

== Book ==
Based on the real-life Operation Frankton, the film was quickly followed by the publication of Brigadier C. E. Lucas Phillips' book of the same name. Commanding officer Herbert "Blondie" Hasler had connections with both the film and the book. He hated the title of both and left his role as technical adviser for the former to try to set the matter right in the latter.

== See also ==
- List of British films of 1955

== Notes ==
- Dixon, Wheeler W. (2001). Collected Interviews: Voices from Twentieth-century Cinema. SIU Press. ISBN 9780809324170.
