= Operation Frankton =

1942 British raid in Bordeaux, France during World War II

- Part of Western Front
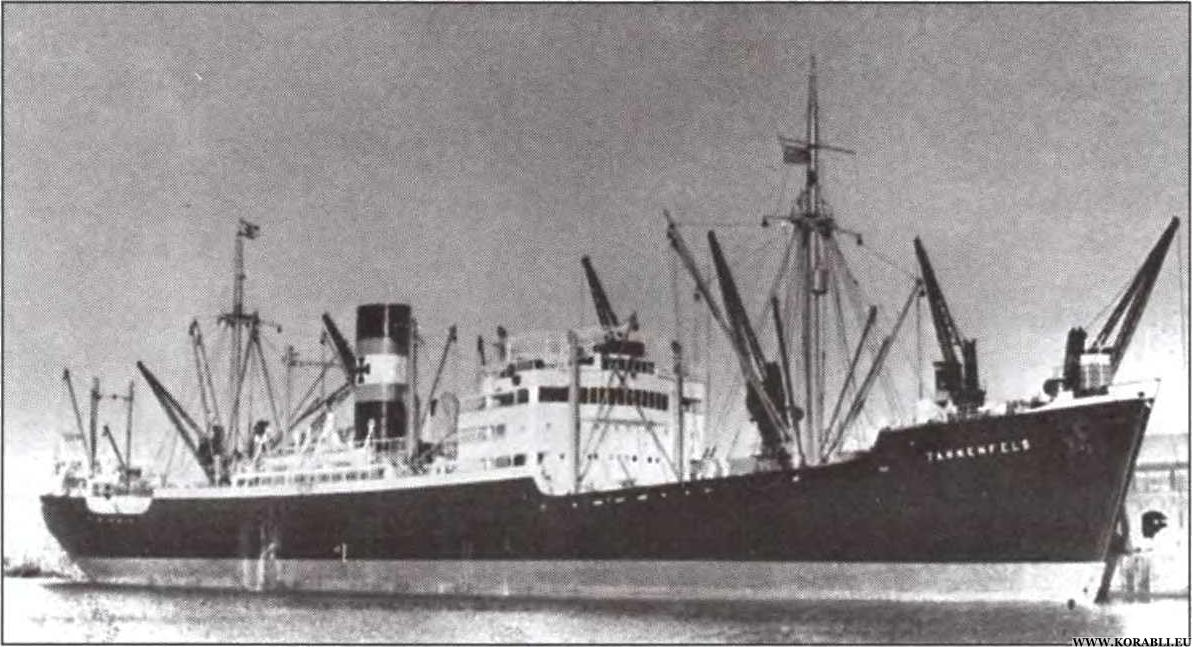
- Tannenfels, a German blockade runner which was sunk in Bordeaux harbour by limpet mines from the Frankton team
| Date | 7–12 December 1942 |
| Location | Bordeaux, France |
| Result | British victory |

Belligerents
| United Kingdom | (Nazi Germany) Germany |

Commanders and leaders
| Herbert Hasler | Julius Bachmann |

Strength
| 13 men; 6 kayaks ("Cockle" mark 2) | 2 naval trawlers; 12 E boats; 12 patrol boats; 6 M-class minesweepers |

Casualties and losses
| 6 men captured & executed; 2 died from hypothermia | 2 ships sunk; 2 ships severely damaged; 2 ships minor damaged |

Operation Frankton was a commando raid on ships in the German occupied French port of Bordeaux in southwest France during World War II. The raid was carried out by a small unit of Royal Marines known as the Royal Marines Boom Patrol Detachment (RMBPD), part of Combined Operations, inserted by the submarine HMS Tuna captained by Lieutenant-Commander Dick Raikes who, earlier, had been awarded the DSO for operations while in command of the submarine HMS Seawolf (47S). The RMBPD would later form the Special Boat Service.

The plan was for six folding kayaks to be taken to the area of the Gironde estuary by submarine. Twelve men would then paddle by night to Bordeaux. On arrival they would attack the docked cargo ships with limpet mines and then escape overland to Spain. Men from no.1 section were selected for the raid; including the commanding officer, Herbert "Blondie" Hasler, and with the reserve marine Colley the team numbered thirteen in total. One kayak was damaged while being deployed from the submarine, and it and its crew therefore could not take part in the mission. Only two of the ten men who launched from the submarine survived the raid: Hasler, and his number two in the kayak, Bill Sparks. Of the other eight, six were executed by the Germans and two died from hypothermia. Two German vessels were sunk with another four suffering varying degrees of damage.

== Background ==
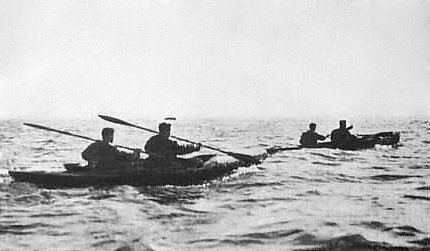
"Cockles" MK II

The Royal Marines Boom Patrol Detachment (RMBPD) was formed on 6 July 1942, and based at Southsea, Portsmouth. The RMBPD was under the command of Royal Marines Major Herbert "Blondie" Hasler with Captain J. D. Stewart as second in command. The detachment consisted of 34 men and was based at Lumps Fort, and often exercised in the Portsmouth Harbour and patrolled the harbour boom at night. On 13 August 1942, Hasler and Stewart visited HMS Tormentor to attend a demonstration of fast motorboat training, in preparation for the operation.

The Bay of Biscay port of Bordeaux was a major destination for goods to support the German war effort. In the 12 months from June 1941 to 1942 vegetable and animal oils, other raw materials, and 25,000 tons of crude rubber had arrived at the port. Hasler submitted a plan of attack on 21 September 1942. The initial plan called for a force of three kayaks to be transported to the Gironde estuary by submarine then paddle by night and hide by day until they reached Bordeaux 60 miles (97 km) from the sea, thus hoping to avoid the 32 mixed Kriegsmarine ships that patrolled or used the port. On arrival they hoped to sink between six and 12 cargo ships then escape overland to Spain.

Permission for the raid was granted on 13 October 1942, but Admiral Louis Mountbatten, chief of combined operations, increased the number of kayaks to be taken to six. Mountbatten had originally ordered that Hasler could not take part in the raid, because of his experience as the chief kayaking specialist, but changed his mind after Hasler (the only man with experience in small boats) formally submitted his reasons for inclusion. The RMBPD started training for the raid on 20 October 1942, which included kayak handling, submarine rehearsals, limpet mine handling and escape and evasion exercises. The RMBPD practised for the raid with a simulated attack against Deptford, starting from Margate and kayaking up the Swale.

Mark II kayaks, which were given the codename of "Cockle", were selected for the raid. The Mark II was a semi rigid two-man kayak, with the sides made of canvas, a flat bottom and 15 feet (4.6 m) long. When collapsed it had to be capable of negotiating the narrow confines of the submarine to the storage area, and then, before it was ready to be taken on deck, erected and stored ready to be hauled out via the submarine torpedo hatch. During the raid each kayak's load would be two men, eight limpet mines, three sets of paddles, a compass, a depth sounding reel, repair bag, torch, camouflage net, waterproof watch, fishing line, two hand grenades, rations and water for six days, a spanner to activate the mines and a magnet to hold the kayak against the side of cargo ships. The total safe load for the "Cockle" Mark 2 was 480 lb (220 kg). The men also carried .45 1911 Colt semi-automatic pistols and Fairbairn–Sykes fighting knives.

The men selected to go on the raid were divided into two divisions, each having their own targets.

- A Division

Hasler and Marine Bill Sparks in kayak Catfish
Corporal Albert Laver and Marine William Mills in kayak Crayfish
Corporal George Sheard and Marine David Moffatt in kayak Conger

- B Division

Lieutenant John Mackinnon and Marine James Conway in kayak Cuttlefish
Sergeant Samuel Wallace and Marine Robert Ewart in kayak Coalfish
Marine W. A. Ellery and Marine E. Fisher in kayak Cachalot

A thirteenth man was taken as a reserve, Marine Norman Colley.

== Mission ==
=== Approach ===
On 30 November 1942 under the command of Lieutenant-Commander Dick Raikes DSO the Royal Navy submarine HMS Tuna sailed from Holy Loch in Scotland with the six kayaks and raiders on board. The submarine was supposed to reach the Gironde estuary and the mission was scheduled to start on 6 December 1942. This was delayed because of bad weather en route and the need to navigate a minefield. By 7 December 1942 the submarine had reached the Gironde estuary and surfaced some 10 miles (16 km) from the mouth of the estuary. Cachalot's hull was damaged while being passed out of the submarine hatch, leaving just five kayaks to start the raid. The reserve member of the team, Colley, was not needed, so he remained aboard the submarine with the Cachalot crew Ellery and Fisher.

According to Tuna's log, the five remaining kayaks were disembarked at 19:30 hours on 7 December. However sources differ on the start time between 19:36 and 20:22. The plan was for the crews to paddle, resting for five minutes in every hour. The first night, 7/8 December, fighting against strong cross tides and cross winds, Coalfish had disappeared. Further on the surviving crews encountered 5 ft (1.5 m) high waves and Conger capsized and was scuttled, once it became apparent that it would not be possible to bail it out. The crew consisting of Sheard and Moffatt held on to two of the remaining kayaks, which carried them as close to the shore as possible, and they then had to swim for it. The three kayaks met the missing Coalfish shortly afterwards and continued.

Carrying on with the raid, the four remaining kayaks approached a checkpoint in the river and came upon three German frigates. Lying flat on the kayaks and paddling silently they managed to get by without being discovered but Mackinnon and Conway in Cuttlefish became separated from the other kayaks in the group. After reaching the shore, MacKinnon and Conway evaded capture for four days, but were betrayed and arrested by the Gendarmerie and handed over to the Germans at La Reole hospital 30 miles (48 km) southeast of Bordeaux, while attempting to make their way to the Spanish border.

On the first night the three remaining kayaks, Catfish, Crayfish and Coalfish, covered 20 miles (32 km) in five hours and landed near St Vivien du Medoc. While they were hiding during the day and unknown to the others, Wallace and Ewart in Coalfish had been captured at daybreak near the Pointe de Grave lighthouse where they had come ashore.

By the end of the second night, 8/9 December, the two remaining kayaks Catfish and Crayfish had paddled a further 22 miles (35 km) in six hours. The third night, 9/10 December, they paddled 15 miles (24 km) and on the fourth night, 10/11 December, because of the strong ebb tide they only managed to cover 9 miles (14 km). The original plan had called for the raid to be carried out on 10 December, but Hasler now changed the plan. Because of the strength of the ebb tide they still had a short distance to paddle, so Hasler ordered they hide for another day and set off to and reach Bordeaux on the night of 11/12 December. After a night's rest, the men spent the day preparing their equipment and limpet mines which were set to detonate at 21:00 hours. Hasler decided that Catfish would cover the western side of the docks and Crayfish the eastern side.

=== Bordeaux ===
Catfish and Crayfish reached Bordeaux on the fifth night, 11/12 December; the river was flat calm and there was a clear sky. The attack started at 21:00 hours on 11 December, Hasler and Sparks in Catfish attacking shipping on the western side of the dock, placed eight limpet mines on four vessels including a Sperrbrecher patrol boat. A sentry on the deck of the Sperrbrecher, apparently spotting something, shone his torch down toward the water, but the camouflaged kayak evaded detection in the darkness. They had planted all their mines and left the harbour with the ebb tide at 00:45 hours. At the same time Laver and Mills in Crayfish had reached the eastern side of the dock without finding any targets, so returned to deal with the ships docked at Bassens. They placed eight limpet mines on two vessels, five on a large cargo ship and three on a small liner.

On their way downriver the two kayaks met by chance on the île Cazeau. They continued down river together until 06:00 hours when they beached their kayaks near St Genes de Blaye and tried to hide them by sinking them. The two crews then set out separately, on foot, for the Spanish border. After two days Laver and Mills were apprehended at Montlieu-la-Garde by the Gendarmerie and handed over to the Germans.

On 10 December, the Germans announced that a sabotage squad had been caught on 8 December near the mouth of the Gironde and "finished off in combat". It was not until January 1943 in the absence of other information that all 10 men on the raid were posted missing, until news arrived of two of them. Later it was confirmed that five ships had been damaged in Bordeaux by mysterious explosions. New research in 2010 revealed that a sixth ship had been damaged even more extensively than any of the other five reported, which were quickly repaired and put back into service.

In his pre-operation briefing, Hasler was told that after the operation he and other members of the group should make their way to the French town of Ruffec, 100 miles (160 km) from where they had beached their kayak, and find someone there from the French Resistance. He and Sparks arrived in Ruffec on 18 December 1942. They made contact with escape line leader Mary Lindell and her son, Maurice, at the Hotel de la Toque Blanche and were taken to a local farm. They spent the next 18 days there in hiding. Lindell arranged for them to be guided on foot across the Pyrenees into Spain and safety.

== Aftermath ==
Six ships were damaged, four of them severely. The German blockade runner Tannenfels listed heavily and soon sank. The rear of the freighter Dresden, whose superstructure and propeller shaft had been severed, sank to the bottom. The cargo ship Alabama was holed by the five limpets and was also severely damaged. The cargo ship Portland was also holed and a fire caused severe internal damage. Subsequently, the Tannenfels which was no longer considered seaworthy, was scuttled and used as a blockship in the Gironde. The Alabama and the Portland with the help of divers, were raised and put in dry dock to undergo repairs which took several months. It is not known precisely what happened to the Sperrbrecher and the tanker Python but it was possible the limpets may have fallen off and exploded in the water. Nevertheless, for several hours after the first explosion there was chaos and confusion at the two ports, Bassens and Bordeaux.

It was not until 23 February 1943 that Combined Operations Headquarters heard via a secret message sent by Mary Lindell to the War Office that Hasler and Sparks were safe. On 2 April 1943 Hasler arrived back in Britain by air from Gibraltar, having passed through the French Resistance escape organisation. Sparks was sent back by sea and arrived much later. For their part in the raid Hasler was awarded a Distinguished Service Order and Sparks the Distinguished Service Medal (DSM). Laver and Mills were also recommended for the DSM which at the time could not be awarded posthumously, so instead they were mentioned in dispatches.

Wallace and Ewart revealed only certain information during their interrogation, and were executed under the Commando Order, on the night of 11 December, in a sandpit in a wood north of Bordeaux, and not at Chateau Magnol, Blanquefort, as is sometimes claimed. A plaque has been erected on the bullet-marked wall at the Chateau, but the authenticity of the details on the plaque has been questioned; indeed given the evidence of a statement by a German officer who was at the execution it is certain that the chateau has no link with Wallace and Ewart. A small memorial can also be seen at the Pointe de Grave, where they were captured. In March 2011 a €100,000 memorial was unveiled at this same spot. After the Royal Marines were executed by a naval firing squad, the Commander of the Navy Admiral Erich Raeder wrote in the Seekriegsleitung war diary that the executions of the captured Royal Marines were something "new in international law, since the soldiers were wearing uniforms". The American historian Charles Thomas wrote that Raeder's remarks about the executions in the Seekriegsleitung war diary seemed to be some sort of ironic comment, which might have reflected a bad conscience on Raeder's part.

Mackinnon had been admitted to the hospital for treatment for an infected knee. Evidence shows that Laver, Mills, Mackinnon and Conway were not executed in Paris in 1942 but possibly in the same location as Wallace and Ewart under the Commando Order. The exact date of their execution is not known.

Sheard and Moffatt from the capsized Conger were not drowned on the first night but died of hypothermia. The body of Moffatt was found on the Île de Ré on 14 December but Sheard's body is believed to have been recovered and buried elsewhere further up the coastline. Sheard is remembered on the Hero's Stone at his place of birth, North Corner, Devonport.

=== Memorials ===
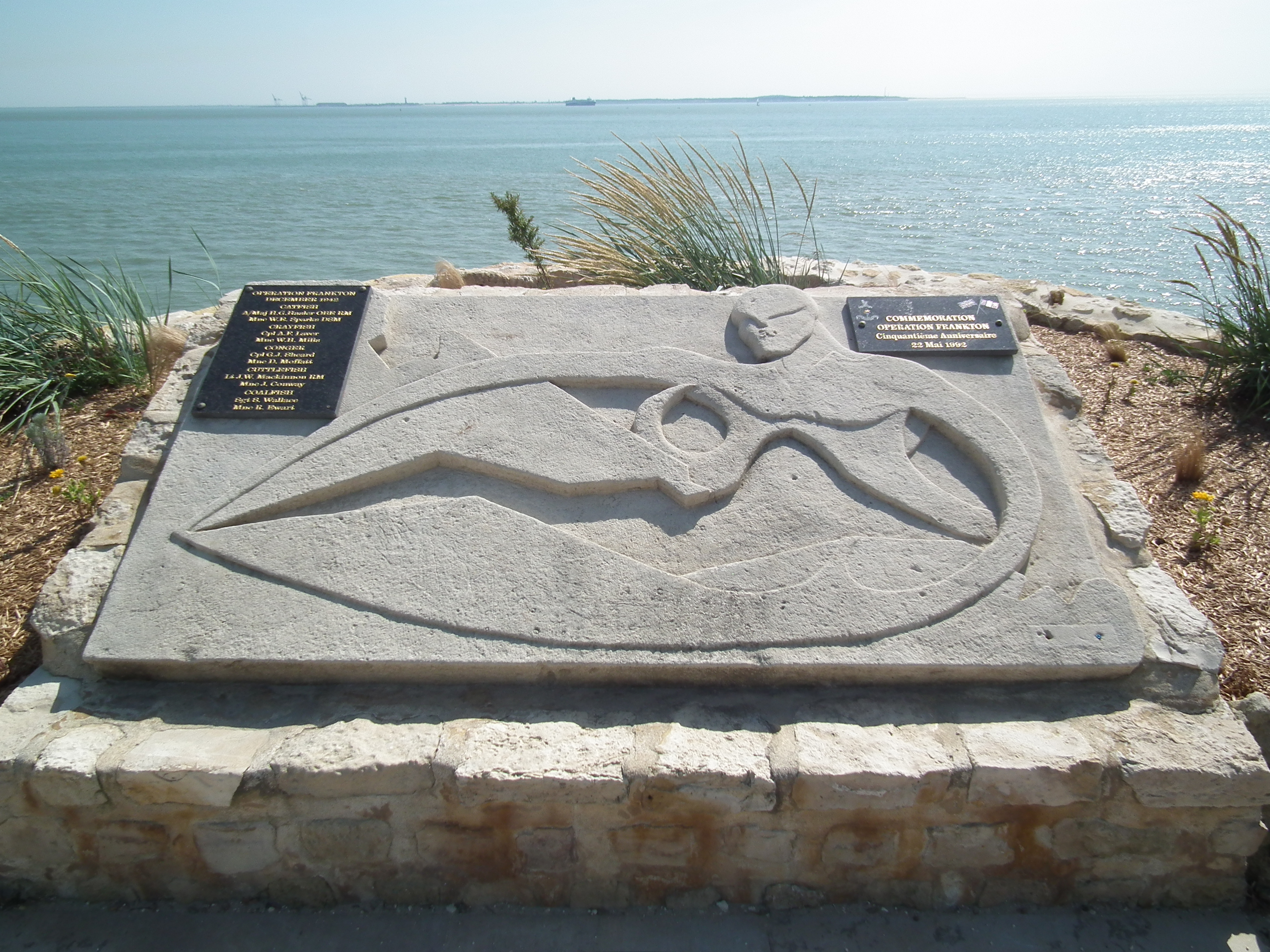
Monument commemorating Operation Frankton in Saint-Georges-de-Didonne, near Royan.

The words of Mountbatten, the commander of Combined Operations, are carved into a Purbeck stone at Royal Marines Poole (current headquarters of the Special Boat Service (SBS): "Of the many brave and dashing raids carried out by the men of Combined Operations Command none was more courageous or imaginative than Operation Frankton".

Mackinnon is commemorated on the Portsmouth Naval Memorial. The bravery of the 'Cockleshell Hero' Royal Marine James Conway was honoured with a permanent memorial unveiled on Sunday 10 December 2017 in his home town of Stockport. There is a plaque commemorating the 70th anniversary of the operation in Birkenhead, the home of Corporal Albert Laver.

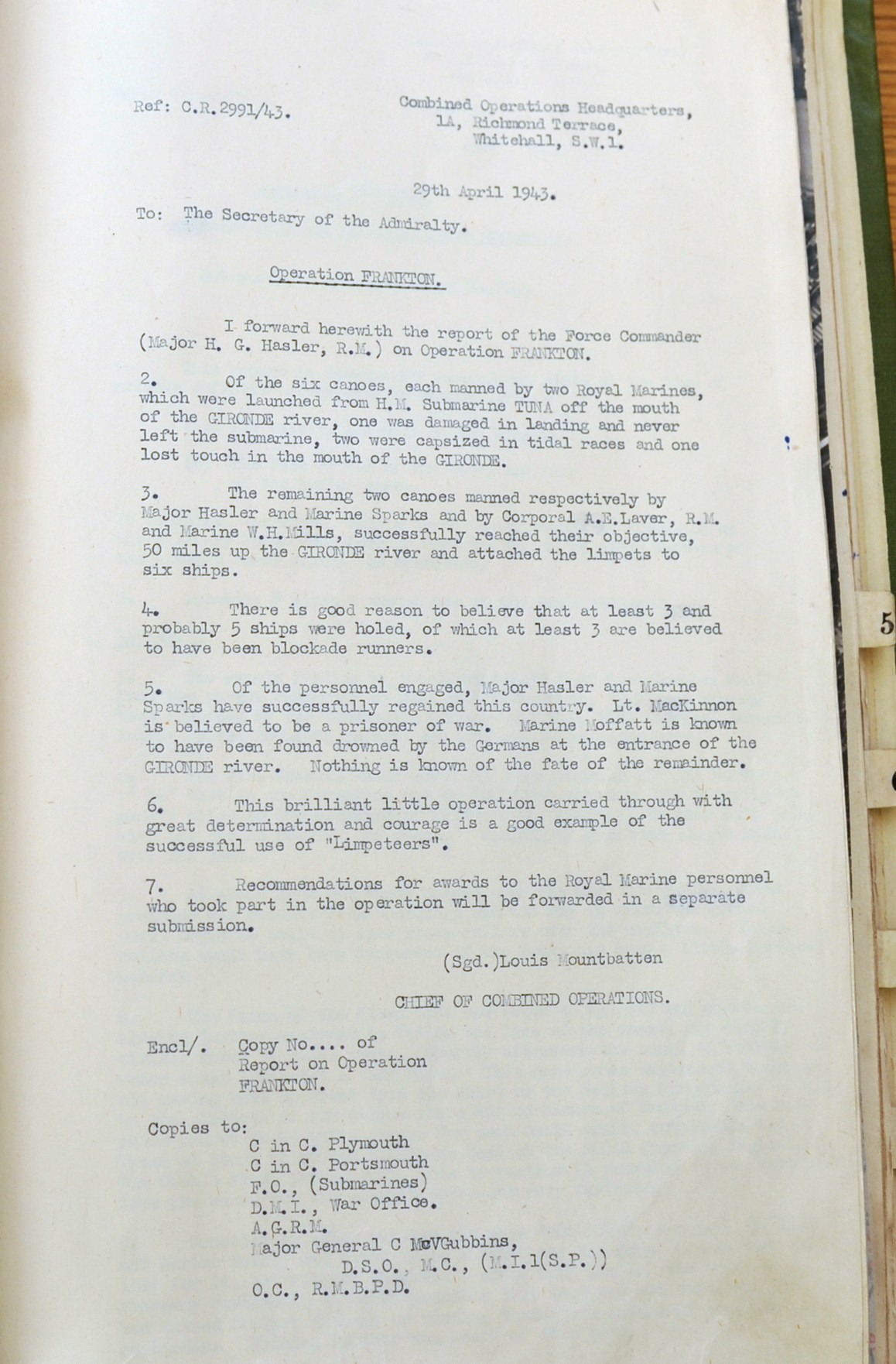
Operation Frankton was described by Louis Mountbatten as "This brilliant little operation carried through with great determinism and courage..."

Laver, Sheard, Mills, Conway, Wallace, Moffatt, and Ewart are commemorated on the Plymouth Naval Memorial.

In June 2002, the Frankton Trail was opened, a walking path which traces the 100 miles (160 km) route taken through occupied France, on foot, by Hasler and Sparks. The Frankton Souvenir is an Anglo-French organisation, set up to keep alive the story of the raid. It plans to develop the trail, and install explanatory plaques at points.

On 31 March 2011 a memorial to the Cockleshell Heroes and three French individuals was dedicated. Made from Portland stone it was transported across care of Brittany Ferries. The memorial cost about £80,000 (equivalent to £118,298 in 2025).

The only known surviving Cockle Mark II kayak from Operation Frankton, Cachalot, together with other original equipment, can be seen at the Combined Military Services Museum, located in Maldon, Essex.

In France, the memory of the heroes of Operation Frankton is commemorated every year, notably in Bordeaux, Blanquefort, Saint-Georges-de-Didonne and Ruffec.

Commemorative plaques have been placed in the Entre-deux-Mers region in Baigneaux and Cessac. Unfortunately, the one in Cessac, located on the edge of a bicycle path, in view of the Jaubert farmhouse, has been vandalized. In 2011, as part of a project to move the monument to the dead of the 1914–1918 war, the municipality proposes to place a second plaque against the wall of the town hall, at the new location of the commemorations. A monument is also present on the town of Montalivet-les-Bains, facing the sea. A tramway station on line C of the TBM network, located in the town of Blanquefort, is named Frankton.

=== Depictions ===
A heavily fictionalised version of the event was depicted in the 1955 film The Cockleshell Heroes made by Warwick Films, and starring Anthony Newley, Trevor Howard, Christopher Lee, Victor Maddern, David Lodge and Jose Ferrer, who was also the director. The film was a box office hit in 1956 and was quickly followed by the publication of Brigadier C. E. Lucas Phillips' book of the same name. "Blondie" Hasler had connections with both the film and the book. He hated the title of both and walked away from his role as technical adviser for the former to try and set the matter right in the latter.

On 1 November 2011, a BBC Timewatch television documentary called The Most Courageous Raid of WWII was narrated by Paddy Ashdown, a former SBS officer. Ashdown describes Frankton as "a Whitehall cock-up of major proportions" due to a simultaneous mission to sink the ships in Bordeaux, led by Claude de Baissac of the Special Operations Executive, which Hasler's team and Combined Operations knew nothing about because of the secrecy and lack of co-operation among British government agencies. De Baissac was preparing to take explosives onto the ships when he heard the explosions of Hasler's limpet mines. The loss of the opportunity for Hasler and de Baissac to work together to strike a harder blow against the Germans in a combined operation led to the setting up of a Controlling Officer at Whitehall, responsible for avoiding inter-departmental rivalry, duplication or even conflict. (Note: M. R. D. Foot, Professor of Modern History, Manchester University)

In December 2022, ten former Royal Marines recreated the route of Operation Frankton in the Cockleshell 22 project, to support charities Royal British Legion, the Royal Marines Charity, and Help for Heroes. They paddled over 70 miles in folding kayaks along the Gironde estuary to Bordeaux, where they took part in joint French-British commemoration events. They then made a 100-mile speed march from Blaye to Ruffec, the escape route followed by Major Hasler and Corporal Sparks.

== See also ==
- Operation Checkmate

== Sources ==
- Rees, Quentin (2011). Cockleshell Heroes: The Final Witness. Amberley. ISBN 978-1445605951.
- Rees, Quentin (2008). The Cockleshell Canoes: British Military Canoes of World War Two. Amberley. ISBN 978-1848680654.
- Bird, Keith W. (2006). Erich Raeder: Admiral of the Third Reich. Annapolis: Naval Institute. ISBN 978-1557500472.
- Cohen, William A. (2005). Secrets of Special Ops Leadership: Dare the Impossible – Achieve the Extraordinary. AMACOM. ISBN 978-0814408407.
- Ashdown, Paddy (2012). A Brilliant Little Operation: The Cockleshell Heroes and the Most Courageous Raid of World War 2. Aurum. ISBN 978-1781311257.
- Southby-Tailyour, Ewen (1998). Blondie – a Life of Lieutenant–Colonel H. G. Hasler DSO OBE RM – Founder of the SBS and Modern Single Handed Ocean Racing. Leo Cooper. ISBN 978-0850525168.
- Jacobs, Peter (2015). Daring Raids of World War Two Heroic Land, Sea and Air Attacks. Pen & Sword Aviation. ISBN 9781783463336.
- Thomas, Charles S. (1990). The German Navy in the Nazi Era. Unwin Hyman. pp. 212–213. ISBN 978-0044454939.
