= Bill Sparks =

Royal Marine of the second world war

William Edward "Bill" Sparks
- Born: 5 September 1922; Clerkenwell, London, England
- Died: 30 November 2002 (aged 80); Alfriston, East Sussex, England
- Military career
- Allegiance: United Kingdom
- Branch: Royal Marines
- Rank: Marine
- Conflicts: World War II
- Awards: Distinguished Service Medal

William Edward Sparks DSM (5 September 1922 – 1 December 2002) was a British Royal Marine Commando in World War II. He was the last survivor of the "Cockleshell Heroes" of Operation Frankton in 1942; a team of commandos who paddled 85 miles from the Bay of Biscay up the Gironde estuary to Bordeaux in German occupied France, to plant limpet mines on merchant ships supplying the Nazi war machine.

== Operation Frankton ==
Sparks was born in Bartholomew Buildings, Seward Street, Clerkenwell, London and joined the Royal Marines upon the outbreak of World War II. He volunteered for hazardous service as a way of avenging his brother Benny who had died on the cruiser HMS Naiad.

During the night of 7 December 1942, ten Royal Marines set out in five folding kayaks on Operation Frankton in Bordeaux, France. They caused considerable damage to five German ships, but six of the men were shot by the Germans and two died of hypothermia after their canoe capsized. The two survivors, Sparks and Major Herbert "Blondie" Hasler, made their way overland to the town of Ruffec, There, they met escape line leader, Mary Lindell, who arranged for them to be smuggled across the border into Spain from where they reached safety in Gibraltar.

When Hasler flew home, Sparks was sent back to England under arrest, as no one in Gibraltar could corroborate his story. On arrival, he escaped from the military police and went to see his father, who had been told that he was missing in action. Two days later, he reported to the Admiralty and was about to be arrested again, when he slipped out to Combined Operations Headquarters, where he was greeted with astonishment.

During the rest of the war, he served in Burma, North Africa and Italy. Afterwards, he worked as a bus driver, during the Malayan Emergency as a police lieutenant, and then as a bus inspector.

Sparks lived for many years in Loughton, Essex, where he is commemorated by a blue plaque on his house there, before moving in the early seventies to Canvey Island. After the death of his first wife Violet in 1982, Sparks and his second wife Irene relocated to Alfriston, East Sussex.

Sparks was survived by his second wife, a daughter and three sons.

== Honours and awards ==
- 29 June 1943 - Distinguished Service Medal For courage and enterprise: Marine William Edward Sparks, Ply.X.3664..
- There is a blue plaque to Sparks on the council house he occupied after the war in Poundfield Road, Loughton, Essex.
