= Defence Storage and Distribution Agency =

Former executive agency in the UK

The Defence Storage and Distribution Agency was an executive agency of the Government of the United Kingdom under the Ministry of Defence (MoD). The DSDA operated from locations in the United Kingdom and northern Germany and was the storage and distribution arm of the Defence Equipment and Support (DE&S) organisation. Its role was to store, maintain, issue, process and distribute materiel for the MoD and other designated users.

Following a review, the MoD decided to remove the DSDA's executive agency status from 1 August 2010 with the intent to outsource its functions to the private sector where economically practical. At that point DSDA ceased to exist, becoming part of the Joint Support Chain (Services) (JSC(S)).
