= Herbert Hasler =

Royal Marines officer

Herbert George Hasler
- Born: 27 February 1914; Dublin, Ireland
- Died: 5 May 1987 (aged 73); Glasgow, Scotland
- Military career
- Allegiance: United Kingdom
- Branch: Royal Marines
- Service years: 1932–1948
- Rank: Lieutenant Colonel
- Nickname: Blondie
- Conflicts: Second World War: Norwegian campaign; Operation Frankton
- Awards: Distinguished Service Order; Officer of the Order of the British Empire; Mentioned in Despatches; Croix de guerre (France)

Herbert George "Blondie" Hasler, DSO, OBE (27 February 1914 – 5 May 1987) was a lieutenant colonel in the Royal Marines. Soon after joining the Marines, he grew a blonde moustache, from which he acquired his nickname ‘Blondie'. In December 1942, during the Second World War, Hasler led a small commando raid against Axis shipping in Bordeaux. He was responsible for many of the concepts which ultimately led to the formation of the Special Boat Service. After the war he became a notable yachtsman, contributing especially to developments in single-handed sailing.

== Early life ==
Hasler was born in Dublin on 27 February 1914, the youngest son of Lieutenant Arthur Thomas Hasler (a Royal Army Medical Corps quartermaster), and his wife, Annie Georgina (née Andrews). His father died after the troopship Transylvania was torpedoed on 4 May 1917. Hasler was sent to Wellington College, where he was a keen sportsman. He was commissioned into the Royal Marines on 1 September 1932.

== Second World War ==
In 1940, Hasler served as fleet landing officer in Scapa Flow, and was then sent to Narvik in support of the French Foreign Legion in the Norwegian campaign, for which duties he was appointed an Officer of the Order of the British Empire (OBE), mentioned in despatches, and awarded the French Croix de guerre.

At the age of 28 in 1942, Major Hasler planned and personally led Operation Frankton, for which he was subsequently awarded the Distinguished Service Order (DSO). He was also recommended for the Victoria Cross, but was not eligible because his actions were not "in the face of the enemy" as required for that decoration. There are conflicting opinions about the impact of this costly operation on the war effort, but the courage and enterprise of the participants is not in doubt.

In commemoration of Herbert Hasler's efforts in Operation Frankton, the UK Kayak marathon racing series is named 'The Hasler Series'.

== Sailing ==
Hasler is known as the father of single-handed sailing, owing to his invention of the first practical self-steering gear for yachts: many sailing vessels continue to rely on systems substantially based on Hasler's work.

In 1947 he took part in the Royal Ocean Racing Club Dinard Race – Cowes to Dinard, sailing the yacht Tre-sang, winning his class championship.

In 1960, Hasler competed in the first Observer Single-handed Transatlantic Race (OSTAR), from Plymouth to New York. The race, originated solely by Hasler, did not include any "half a crown" bet as the myth suggests with Sir Francis Chichester the fourth of the five competitors to enter the race. Of the fifty yachtsmen who sent letters of intent to compete, only five eventually started. Hasler himself sailed one of the smallest boats in the race, his heavily modified Nordic Folkboat Jester, and finished second in 48 days to Chichester's much larger Gipsy Moth III. Jester was equipped with Hasler's self-steering system. David Lewis sailed Cardinal Vertue – a design of Laurent Giles – to the third place; see also the book: The Ship Would Not Travel Due West.

Hasler had Jester built some years prior to the first trans-Atlantic race, specifying that a fully enclosed deck, with two circular hatches in the cabin top rather than a conventional cockpit, be built on the standard hull. He used the boat as a floating laboratory to develop his self-steering system, and also pioneered the use of a Chinese-style junk rig on a western yacht, to avoid the physical effort and potentially dangerous deck-work, required to handle a conventional rig single-handed. The junk rig allowed all sail handling to be done from the safety of the central control hatch, and Hasler claimed he could sail Jester across the Atlantic without ever leaving the cabin.

Hasler and Jester returned for the 1964 OSTAR, finishing fifth in 37 days, 22 hours. On his return Hasler, who was becoming disenchanted with what he perceived as the race's commercialisation, and the increasing size, complexity and expense of the yachts brought about by sponsorship, sold Jester to Mike Richey. Richey continued to race the boat until she was lost in an Atlantic storm during the 1988 OSTAR.

== See also ==
- The Cockleshell Heroes

== Sources ==
- Ewen Southby-Tailyour, 'Hasler, Herbert George (1914–1987)’, rev., Oxford Dictionary of National Biography, Oxford University Press, 2004 accessed 9 March 2008
- Ewen Southby-Tailyour, Blondie : a life of Lieutenant-Colonel H.G. Hasler, DSO, OBE, Croix de Guerre, Royal Marines; with a foreword by HRH the Duke of Edinburgh (London : Leo Cooper, 1998)
- Royal Marine (RM) Officers 1939–1945
