= Raikes =

Raikes is an English surname. Notable bearers include:

== People ==
- Arthur Raikes (1867–1915), British army officer
- Cyril Raikes (1875–1963), British soldier, son of Robert Napier Rakes
- Dick Raikes (1912–2005), Royal Naval Commander
- Geoffrey Raikes (1884–1975), British Army General and Lord Lieutenant of Brecknockshire
- Ernest Raikes, English cricketer
- George Raikes (1873–1966), English cricketer and footballer, brother of Ernest Raikes
- Harriet Raikes, novelist, daughter of the above
- Henry Raikes (1782–1854), British clergyman, younger son of Thomas Raikes "the Elder"
- Henry Cecil Raikes (1838–1891), British Conservative politician, son of the above
- Iwan Raikes (1921–2011), Vice-Admiral, Royal Navy officer, Naval Secretary, son of Admiral Sir Robert Raikes.
- Jeff Raikes (born 1958), co-founder of the Raikes Foundation
- Job Mathew Raikes (1767–1833) Governor of the Bank of England from 1801 to 1802
- Kenneth Raikes (1890–1973), Welsh cricketer
- Raymond Raikes (1910–1998), English radio classics director and producer
- Robert Raikes the Elder (1690–1757), British printer and newspaper proprietor
- Robert Raikes (1736–1811), English promoter of Sunday Schools and philanthropist, eldest son of Robert Raikes the Elder
- Robert Raikes (Royal Navy officer) (1885–1953), Royal Navy officer
- Robert Raikes (1765–1837), English banker
- Robert Raikes (1683–1753), British Member of Parliament for Northallerton
- Robert Napier Raikes (1813–1909), British soldier in India, grandson of Robert Raikes
- Ron Raikes (1943–2009), American politician from Nebraska
- Thomas Raikes ("the Elder") (1741–1813), British banker, Governor of the Bank of England, third son of Robert Raikes the Elder
- Thomas Raikes (dandy) ("the Younger") (1777–1848), British merchant banker, dandy and diarist, eldest son of the above
- Thomas Raikes (cricketer) (1902–1984), English cricketer
- Sir Victor Raikes (1901–1986), British Conservative politician, grandson of the above
