= Robert Raikes (disambiguation) =

Robert Raikes (1736–1811) was an English pioneer of Sunday schools, Gloucester newspaper publisher, and philanthropist.

Robert Raikes may also refer to:

- Robert Raikes (1683–1753), British Member of Parliament for Northallerton
- Robert Raikes the Elder (1690–1757), English printer and newspaper publisher
- Robert Raikes (1765–1837), British banker and builder of a notable mausoleum
- Robert Raikes (1818–1901), established a tractarian church at Treberfydd
- Robert Raikes (Royal Navy officer) (1885–1953), British admiral
- Robert Napier Raikes (1813–1909), British Indian Army officer

== Other ==
Robert Raikes' House, a 16th-century timber-framed town house in Gloucester
