= Henry Raikes =

English cleric (1782–1854)

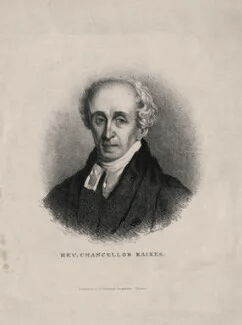
- Henry Raikes
- Born: 24 September 1782; 12 New Broad Street, London
- Died: 28 November 1854 (aged 72); Chester, Cheshire, England
- Resting place: Overleigh Cemetery, Chester, England
- Education: Eton College
- Alma mater: St John’s College, Cambridge
- Spouse: Augusta Whittington (m. 1809; died 1820)
- Children: 5
- Parents: Thomas Raikes (father); Charlotte Finch (mother)

Henry Raikes (1782–1854) was an English cleric, chancellor of the diocese of Chester from 1830 to 1854.

== Childhood and education ==
Henry Raikes was born on 24 September 1782 at 12 New Broad Street, London. His father, Thomas, was a wealthy merchant, and his mother, Charlotte, was the granddaughter of the 7th Earl of Winchilsea.

Thomas Raikes had become wealthy through his own ability and enterprise. He was born in Gloucester, where his father, Robert Raikes, had founded the Gloucester Journal. After their father’s death, Thomas and his brother, William, moved to London and established a merchant business that became immensely successful. In 1776, Thomas was elected a director of the Bank of England, a position he held until 1810. He also served on the committee of several charities, including the Society for Sunday Schools.

In 1774, Thomas married Charlotte Finch, the illegitimate daughter of an aristocrat called Henry Finch. Charlotte’s portrait by George Romney depicts her sitting at a keyboard in a sumptuous white dress, looking elegant and graceful.

Thomas and Charlotte had five daughters and four sons. Georgiana married Lord William Fitzroy, and Harriet married Stratford Canning. Thomas (junior) joined the family business; Richard became a banker; and George became a director of the East India Company. Henry was the only son to reject a career in banking and commerce.

As he was their second son, his parents may have steered him towards the Church from a young age. When he was a boy, they sent him to the hamlet of Neasden to be educated by his uncle, Richard Raikes. This uncle was a priest who had been a fellow at St John’s College, Cambridge before he suffered a breakdown. Although married, he had no children of his own. Racked by almost constant pain, he may have sometimes contemplated suicide as he subscribed to a book on the subject in 1790. Sadly, he treated his nephew with the utmost severity. Whether his cruelty stemmed from by a tortured psyche or twisted religious ideas about the depravity of human nature is impossible to say.

When Raikes was ten or eleven, he went to Eton School. There, he excelled in classics and became a close friend of John Bird Sumner, the future Archbishop of Canterbury.

On 18 May 1800, Raikes entered St John’s College, Cambridge, where he cultivated valuable friendships but failed to apply himself wholeheartedly to his studies. While he loved the classics, he was less interested in mathematics. In January 1804, the university awarded him a second-class degree. In 1805, he won the Members’ Prize for a classical essay.

In 1805, he embarked on a journey to Greece, choosing his route to suit the wartime conditions. After crossing the sea to Prussia, he travelled through Austria, Hungary, and Italy. From Venice, he sailed to Greece, where he met Lord Aberdeen, whom he had known at Cambridge. Together, they explored ancient sites and visited Albania. In 1806, Raikes returned home to London via Gibraltar and Lisbon.

After his return from Greece, Raikes lived with his parents in their house at 14 Upper Grosvenor Street, Mayfair. He indulged in the pleasures of London society and mixed with some eminent people.

== Early career ==
On 20 September 1807, he took Holy Orders, being ordained a deacon at Norwich. On 18 December 1808, the Bishop of Winchester ordained him as a priest and licensed him to the curacy of Betchworth, a parish near Dorking.

On 16 March 1809, Raikes married Augusta Whittington at St George's, Hanover Square, Westminster. She was the daughter of Jacob John Whittington of Theberton Hall, Suffolk, a wealthy country squire.

Jacob’s circumstances were unusual in that he had inherited his wealth from an aunt and uncle, who had died childless. Without this windfall, his means would have been modest. Some of this inheritance was legally suspect, which led to a court battle that lasted more than twenty years. In 1800, Jacob lost the case, which then released funds to found Downing College, Cambridge.

Raikes and Augusta may have met through her brother, George Downing Whittington, who was probably friends with Raikes at Eton and Cambridge. A young man of remarkable promise, Whittington died of dysentery in his lodgings at Cambridge on 24 July 1807.

Although Raikes loved Augusta, he disapproved of her parents. In 1805 or 1806, they had arranged a legal separation, under which Jacob settled £16,000 on his wife and six children. The probable cause of their parting was his infidelity some years earlier, which resulted in the birth of a son. Raikes protected himself from disgrace by having nothing to do with his parents-in-law. In her will, his mother-in-law expressed her deep regret that she never knew her grandchildren.

Raikes’s father gave the newly married couple a marriage settlement comprising £4,000 and two farms. He had earlier given his son a promissory note for £10,000. With this wealth, Raikes could have bought a living, and he did indeed consider it. On 29 July 1809, Sir William Gell wrote to Philip Gell of Hopton Hall, Wirksworth, Derbyshire, on Raikes's behalf to obtain more information about a living:

" I sent or rather wrote you a letter yesterday on the subject of the living but I don't know whether you will even get it or not, so I repeat, Henry Raikes the Revd 14 upper Gros St Gros Square wants to buy it but must have particulars & know where your agent is to be seen in town to set his agent about it. This you may be sure of that Raikes has the money & that he will give you the fairest price for it, even if you were to trust it entirely to him without bargain."

But nothing came of it, and instead, he accepted a series of curacies:

1808-c. 1810 Betchworth, Surrey;

1810-1813 Shillingstone, Dorset;

1814-1822 Burnham, Buckinghamshire.

These positions involved onerous duties for low pay. For example, at Burnham, Raikes received a stipend of £100, surplice fees, and accommodation.

Raikes’s married life was happy. His two oldest sons were born at Shillingstone; a third son and two daughters were born at Burnham. This tranquility ended in the autumn of 1820 when his infant daughter and his wife both died. His old friend, John Sumner, offered consolation by quoting Jesus’s words: “What I do thou knowest not now, but though shalt know hereafter.”

In 1822, Raikes inherited great wealth from his parents. When his father died in 1813, he left an estate valued at about £150,000, most of which he gave to his widow for her lifetime. When she died in March 1822, the capital became available to divide among the surviving six children. As Raikes received a legacy of £7,000 and a share of the residue, he probably inherited more than £20,000. In 1824, he inherited more property when his uncle and former tutor, Richard Raikes, left him all his freehold and leasehold lands and buildings.

After leaving Burnham, Raikes lived with his brother, Thomas, at Sudbrook Park, Petersham, Surrey. Then, in 1824, he bought Aldwick Pavilion, a mansion on the Sussex coast. The house came with five acres of land, outbuildings, pleasure grounds, a kitchen garden, and a lawn that sloped to the sea. When first advertised for sale in 1819, the owner set the price at £7,000.

While at Aldwick, Raikes studied his books and schooled his four children. His sister, Charlotte, helped him with their care, remaining his companion until her death on 5 July 1854. In 1828, he took his family on holiday to Switzerland and the River Rhine.

In the summer of 1827, he preached a series of sermons about the attributes of God at the nearby proprietary chapel of St John’s, Bognor.

== Chester ==
=== Chancellorship ===
In 1828, Raikes’s prospects changed dramatically when his old friend, John Bird Sumner, was appointed Bishop of Chester. In September 1829, Sumner appointed Raikes as his Examining Chaplain and took him on his Manchester visitation.

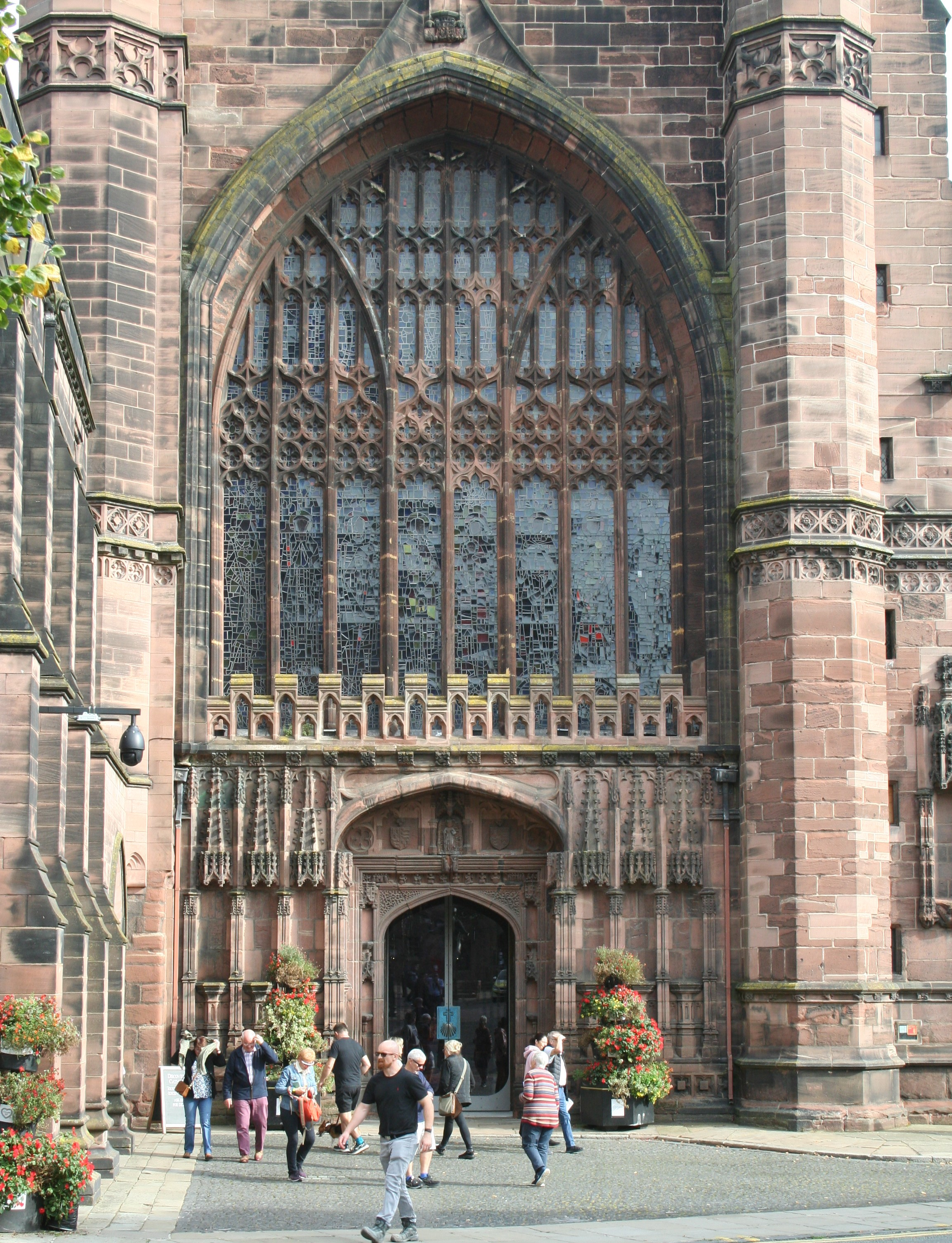
The west door of Chester Cathedral

In November 1830, Raikes was appointed Chancellor of Chester following the death, at the age of 85, of the Rev. Dr. Thomas Parkinson, his non-resident predecessor who had not set foot in Chester for at least five years.

Previously indifferent to high office, Raikes may have accepted the Chancellorship to help his three sons, particularly his eldest son, Henry, who was a student at Cambridge. This son did indeed benefit as, in 1837, he was appointed registrar of the diocese. This office made him profits of about £5,000 a year with little effort.

Raikes delayed moving to Chester for more than a year, using the time to finish and publish Remarks on Clerical Education, a book that proved influential in its call for better training of ordinands. Raikes finally moved to Chester in about April 1832.

From the outset, he acted like a suffragan bishop, overseeing the cathedral and the diocese. In May and June 1832, he visited twenty parishes in the diocese and lectured churchwardens on their responsibilities. He became so deeply involved in the running of the diocese that Charles Simeon, a prominent evangelical churchman, is supposed to have remarked that Chester enjoyed a double episcopacy.

Raikes flourished in his new role, working hard and growing increasingly powerful. In February 1841, he was appointed Rural Dean of Chester, and in August 1844, he was appointed an honorary canon of Chester Cathedral.

He enjoyed social status in Chester. He lived at Dee Side House, a fifteen-bedroom mansion near St John’s churchyard overlooking the River Dee, staffed by six female and three male servants. As Chancellor, his income was at least £2,000 per annum.

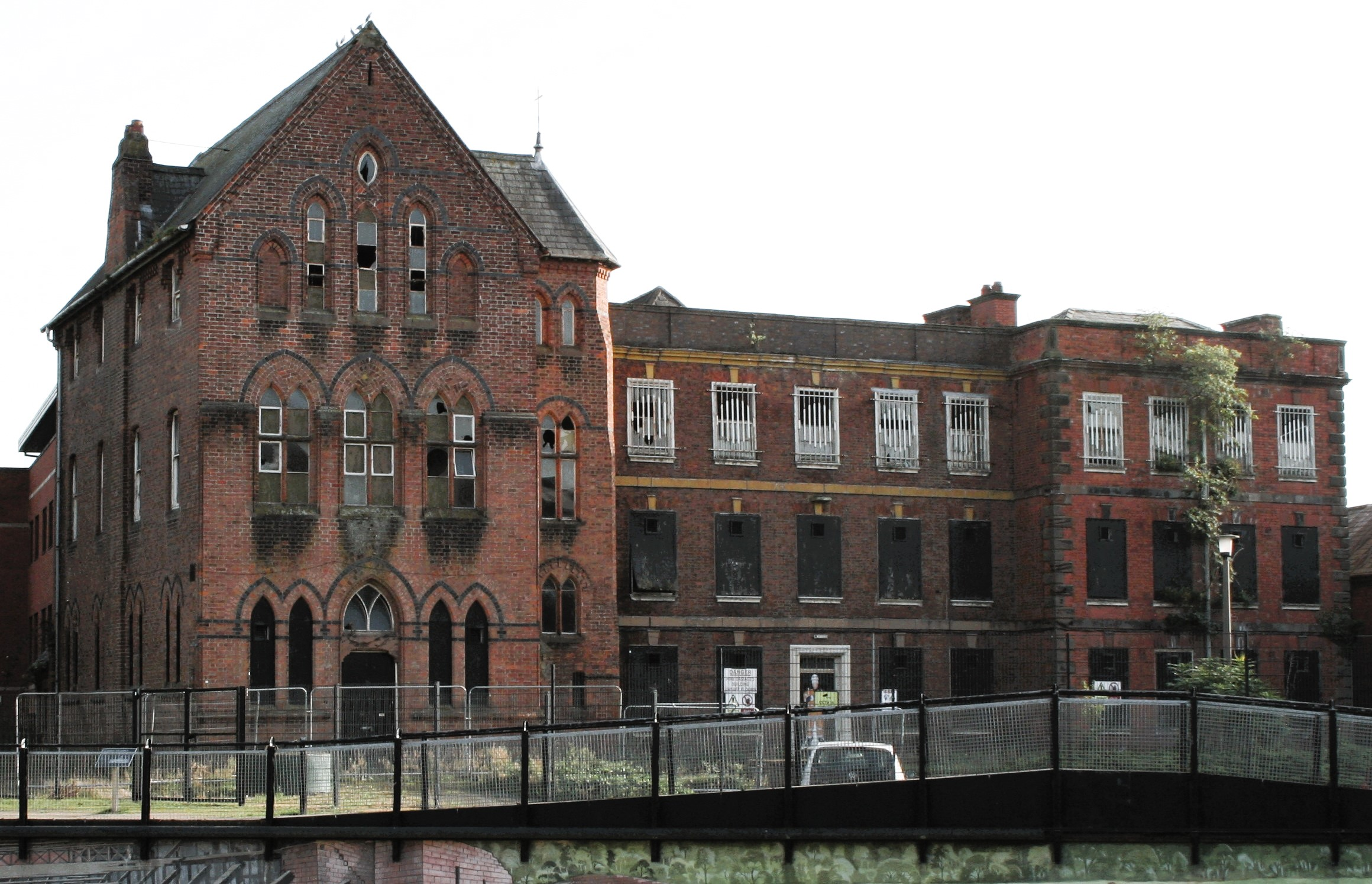
Dee Side House, Chester

As he grew famous, people wanted to see his image. In 1841, a portrait of him by Benjamin Faulkner was exhibited in Chester for the public to see, free of charge. In 1844, a local firm of booksellers advertised prints of an engraving by Frederick Lewis for sale at a guinea each.

In May 1847, the Diocese of Chester lost a large area to the newly formed Diocese of Manchester. Raikes was a leading contender to be the first Bishop of Manchester but lost out to James Prince Lee, the headmaster of King Edward’s School, Birmingham. The Whig Prime Minister, Lord John Russell, probably rejected Raikes because of his Tory sympathies.

However, in 1849, Russell’s government included Raikes in the Commission of Inquiry for the Subdivision of Parishes. The Commissioners issued two reports during Raikes’s lifetime and one after his death.

In 1848, Raikes’s friend, Sumner, left Chester to become the new Archbishop of Canterbury. His departure meant the end of their close working relationship and the end of Raikes’s term as Examining Chaplain.

=== Work with religious groups ===
Raikes was ultra-protestant and profoundly evangelical. He firmly believed in the doctrine of predestination but seldom referred to it in the pulpit.

His evangelicalism is evident in the religious societies he supported. These included the Liverpool Auxiliary Bible Society, the Liverpool Auxiliary Society for Promoting Christianity Amongst the Jews, the Liverpool Auxiliary Church Pastoral Aid Society, the Lancashire Society for Promoting the Due Observance of the Lord’s Day, the Chester Young Men’s Christian Association, the Chester Auxiliary Bible Society, the Sunday School Society for Ireland, the Hibernian Society, the Prayer Book and Homily Society, the Society of Buildings Chapels in the Agricultural Districts of Cheshire, and the Church Missionary Society.

=== Work with other voluntary groups ===
Raikes also supported charities concerned with education and social welfare. In Chester, he helped manage the Female Penitentiary, the Female House of Refuge, the Ragged School Society, the Mendicity Society, the infirmary, the cemetery, and the Chester Mechanics Institution.

His lectures at the Mechanics Institution reveal his profound engagement with issues of the day. One was titled “The theory of population considered in reference to the welfare of States,” and another was called “Christian Political Economy.” He later published a third with the title The Harmony of Science and Revelation.

=== Scholarly interests ===
He had many scholarly interests, including religion, history, and archaeology. He was knowledgeable about the early Christian Fathers and Oriental learning. He served as president of the Chester Architectural, Archaeological, and Historic Society and wrote articles for the society’s journal. He gave the Chetham Society access to early diocesan records and permitted them to publish the antiquarian notes of Bishop Gastrell. He was also active in restoring and preserving the cathedral and many churches.

In 1844, Raikes agreed to edit a memoir of Vice-Admiral Sir Jahleel Brenton. Although he must have devoted hundreds of hours to the project, the outcome was disappointing. The task did not suit his skill set, and the resulting book, published in 1846, is long, tedious, and full of extraneous religious musings.

=== Death, funeral, and will ===
In the spring of 1854, Raikes’s health gave cause for alarm. Although he was operated on and made two visits to London, he grew steadily worse. By mid-November 1854, he was extremely ill and forced to remain in bed. He died early on the morning of Tuesday, 28 November 1854, aged 72. His body was interred at Overleigh Cemetery on the following Tuesday.

His funeral was a grand public event. Over a thousand people joined in the procession as it travelled from St John’s Parochial Schoolroom to the Cemetery Chapel. His coffin was covered in a plain black cloth and carried in a hearse drawn by four horses. Church bells tolled, and thousands of spectators lined the route.

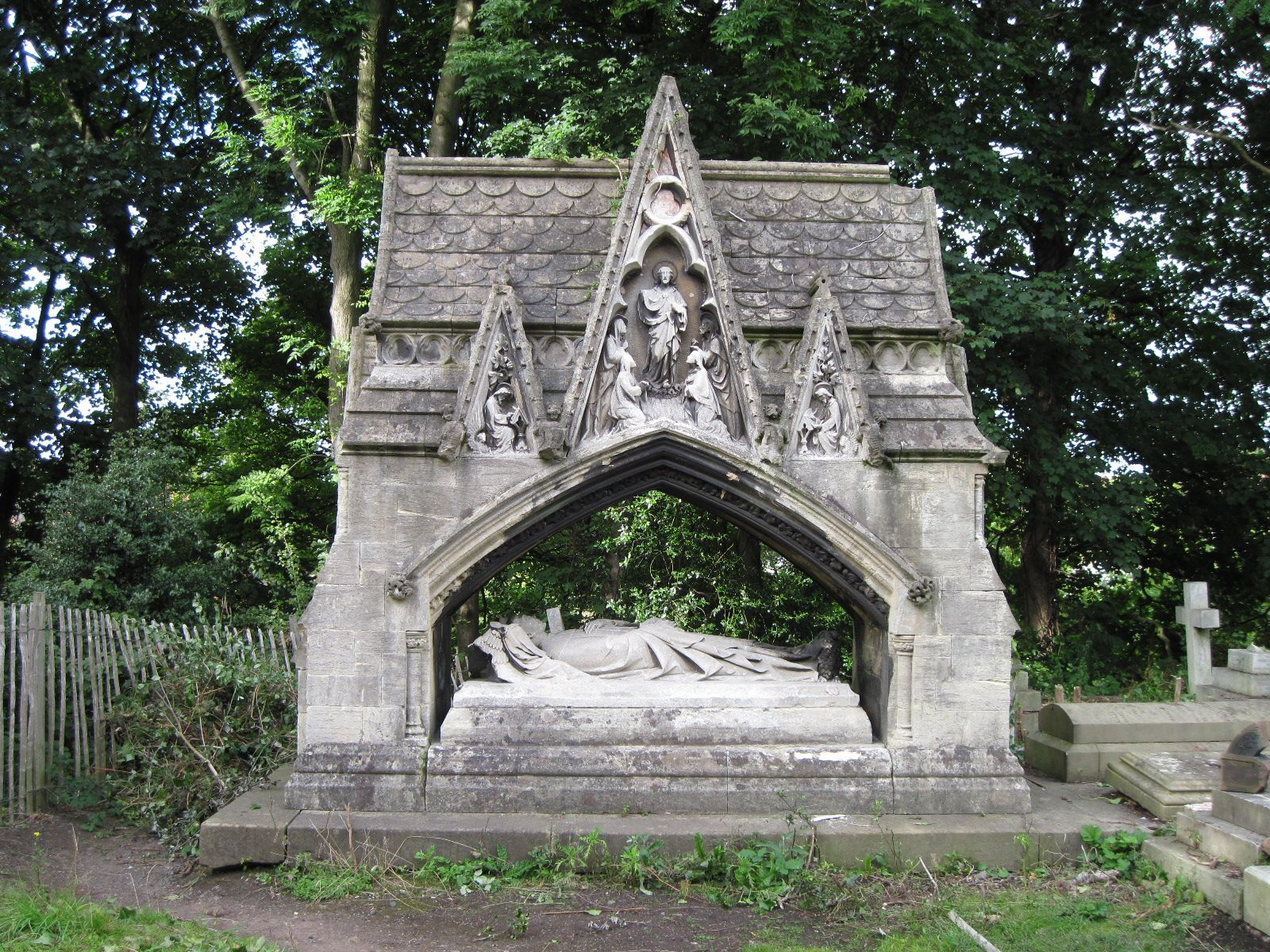
Raikes's public memorial in Overleigh Cemetery, Chester, erected in 1858 to a design by Thomas Penson.

He died a wealthy man. His will, made on 28 February 1853, refers to a valuable marriage settlement, £21,000 in bank annuities, three farms, and land in Gloucestershire.

In the will, he left £50 to his trusted housekeeper. Two weeks after his death, she stole nine boxes of linen and other goods from the house. On 11 April 1855, at the City Sessions, she was sentenced to 15 months hard labour.

In February 1855, his executors sold his theological library by auction in London.

=== Memorials ===
Soon after Raikes’s death, five Chester gentlemen launched an appeal to raise money for a memorial. By 31 July 1855, the sum raised was sufficient to fund a scholarship at the diocesan training college for schoolmasters.

As this appeal closed, another opened to raise money for a monument. In February 1857, after deciding that the best location was over Raikes’s grave, the committee asked a local architect, Thomas Penson, to design a structure that was solid, imposing, and ecclesiastical.

His design was for a monumental tomb, twenty feet high, in the early English style. As the actual monument is smaller than this, the committee may have scaled it down to save money. As it was, they had to appeal for more money and dispense with the iron railings that many subscribers considered necessary. The monument was finally erected in 1858.

Today, few visitors to the cemetery realise his tomb is a public memorial erected by the citizens of Chester to show their gratitude and respect.

== Archival collections and works ==
- Correspondence of Rev. Henry Raikes (180 items) at John Rylands Library, Eng Ms 1121.

For other reference see Papers of British Churchmen 1780-1940 (1987).

- Liverpool University, Special Collections and Archives, holds Henry Raikes's diary of a tour of Greece and the Mediterranean, 1805-1806 (reference No. LUL MS 93).
- The British Library, Manuscript Collections, holds a collection of letters from Henry Raikes to W.E. Gladstone and others, 1807-c.1854 (ref.: GB 058 Add MSS 44364, 44384, 44387, 44488).
- Remarks on Clerical Education.
- A series of sermons, preached in St. Johns chapel, Bognor ... 1827.
- A Sermon preached ... 1832 ... Together with the Report of the current year.
- A Sermon [on 1 Cor. Ii. 2] Preached at the Ordination Held by the ... Bishop of Chester, January 13, 1833.
- Raikes, Henry. A Charge Addressed to the Churchwardens of the Diocese of Chester at the Triennial Visitation, 1844. London: J. Hatchard and Son, 1844. Print. (Available at John Rylands Library)
- Memoir of the Life and Services of Vice-admiral Sir Jahleel Brenton, Baronet, K.C.B.
- Sermons and Essays

Contrary to some authorities, he did not write The Reform of England by the Decrees of Cardinal Pole or A Popular Sketch of the Origin and Development of the English Constitution from the earliest period to the present time. His son, Henry, wrote both books.
