= Robert Raikes' House =

Pub in Gloucester, Gloucestershire, England

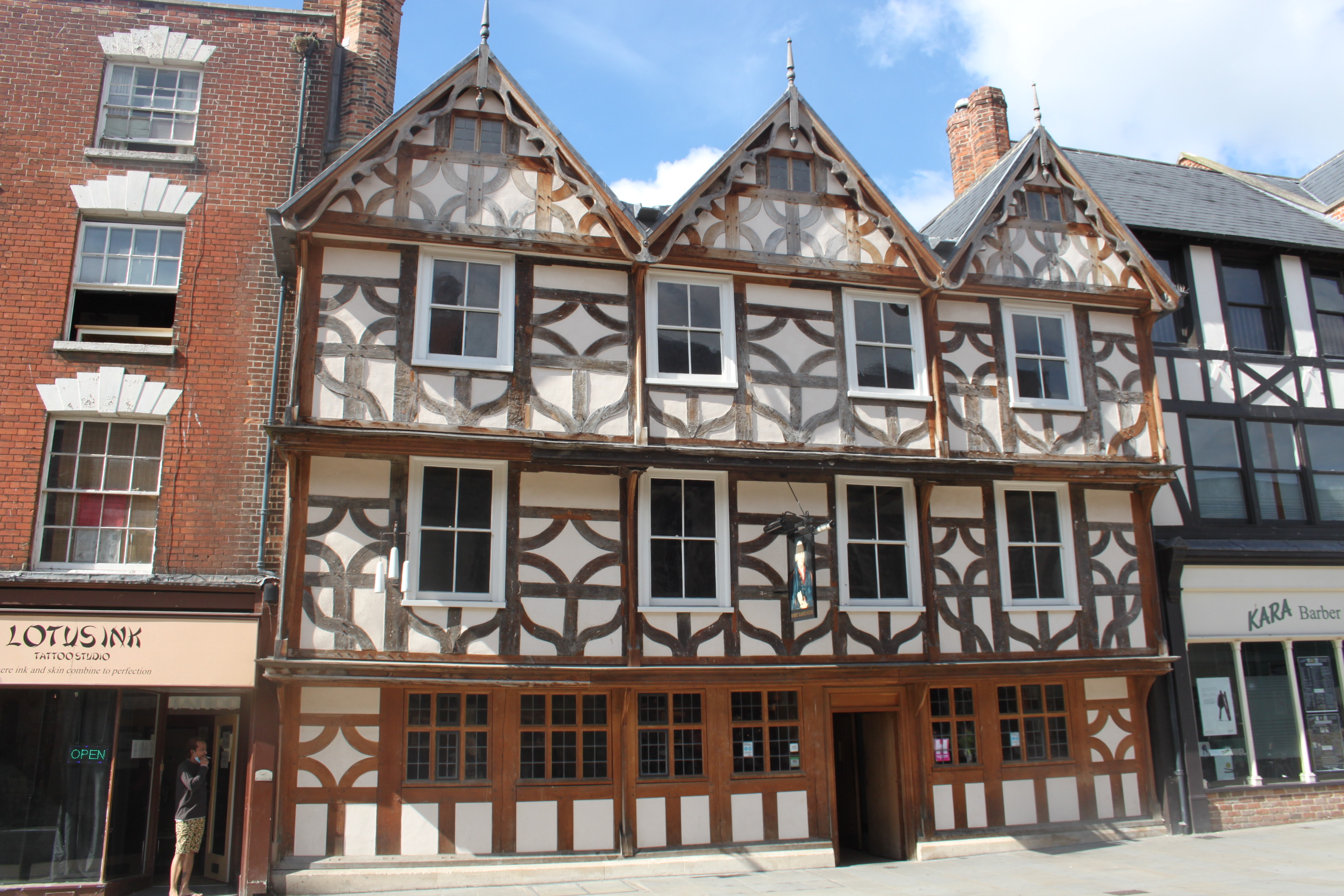
- Front of Robert Raikes' House in September 2013
- Interactive map of Robert Raikes' House
- Location: Gloucester, England
- Coordinates: 51.864505°N 2.2474883°W
- Area: Gloucester
- Built: 1560
- Owner: Samuel Smiths

Robert Raikes' House is an historic 16th century timber-framed town house at 36–38 Southgate Street, Gloucester. It is now used as a public house called the Robert Raikes Inn.

== History ==
Robert Raikes' House was built for use as a merchant's house in 1560. In the early 18th century the rear of the house was extended and internal alterations were carried out. Robert Raikes the Elder started publishing the Gloucester Journal from the building on 9 April 1722. Robert Raikes, the Younger moved his printing business into the house in 1758 where he continued to publish the Gloucester Journal. In 1772, he moved into the house to live with his family. Robert Raikes was a promoter of the Sunday school movement, he held Sunday school sessions in the house's garden and Robert's wife used to serve plum cake to the children. After his death, it was again used as a merchant's house and shop. There were minor alterations made to the building throughout the 19th and 20th centuries. In 1952, the building was grade II* listed. In 1973, the Dirty Duck restaurant opened on the site later becoming the Golden Cross public house in 1975. In 2006, Samuel Smiths bought the building and spent £4.5 million on its restoration. As part of this restoration, the shop front was replaced by more traditional wood-framed walls, also the Malt and Hops pub in the rear courtyard was demolished. It reopened in November 2008 as a public house.

== Architecture ==
Robert Raikes' House is primarily made of a timber-frame with wattle and daub panels. It has a slate double purling roof and is additionally supported by two brick stacks with octagonal shafts. The front of the building has three timber-framed gables. In the 18th-century, a parallel range and cross wing with a raised cruck roof was built in brick at the rear of the building. The building has three storeys, which are jettied, and includes an attic and a cellar. The first floor jetty is supported by consoles, the second and attic floors are supported by curved knee braces. At the front of the building on the ground floor are large windows with glazing bars between the supporting timber posts, which were added in the early 19th-century. The style of the top two floors is typical of west country decorative timber framing. On these floors each of the three bays under the gables is split into three further sections by supporting timber posts and each of these is split again into three more horizontal sections. Each of which are decorated with patterns made of timber. The gables have scalloped and pierced barge boards decorated with spike finials. The doorway is on the right hand side of the second bay.

The interior of the building consists of seven rooms, with the rooms at the back of the building being more lavishly decorated than the rooms at the front. The ground floor is mostly open as it is used as a public house bar. It has exposed ceiling beams and joists which are supported by wooden posts. In the centre of the building is an 18th-century open well staircase with quarter landings, the walls are decorated with dado rails and half height wooden panels. The first floor landing has a two bay timber screen with arches on each side. There is a bedroom with full height panelling and this level also has 16th-century exposed timber framing in several walls. In the 18th century, a stone chimney with an architrave surround was added this is also present in the rooms on the upper floors. There is a second circular staircase on the north side of the building. The cellar consists of brick walls with brick barrel vaults. Throughout the building are a mix of paintings, technical drawings of the building itself and a biography of Robert Raikes. At the rear of the building is a large courtyard.
