= Raymond Raikes =

British theatre producer, director and broadcaster (1910–1998)

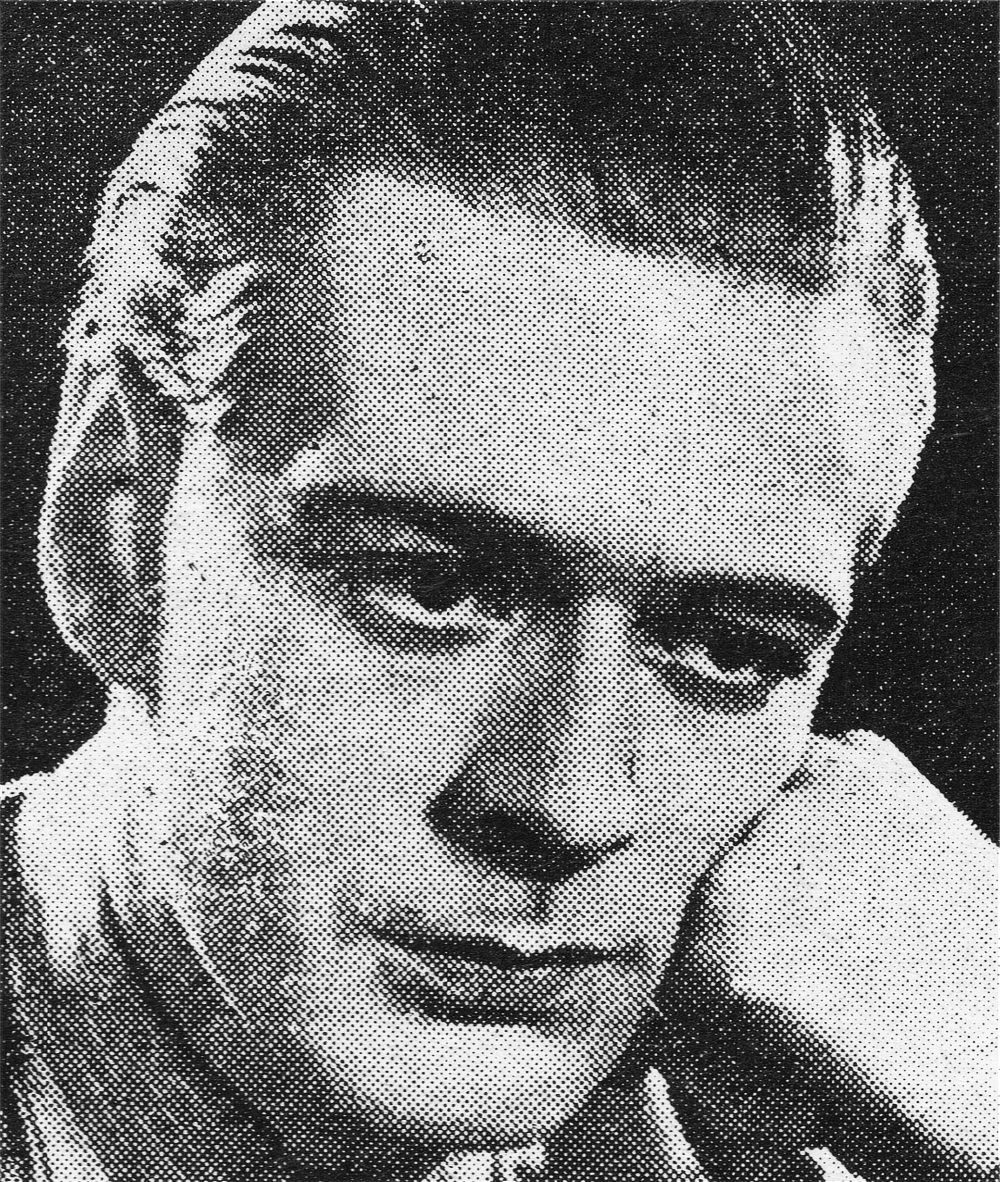
- Raikes in 1945
- Born: Raymond Montgomery Raikes; 13 September 1910; Putney, London, England
- Died: 2 October 1998 (aged 88); Bromley, Kent, England
- Education: Exeter College, Oxford
- Occupations: Theatre and radio producer and director
- Known for: BBC Radio dramas

Raymond Montgomery Raikes (13 September 1910 – 2 October 1998) was a British theatre producer, director and broadcaster. He was particularly known for his productions of classic dramas for BBC Radio's "World Theatre" and "National Theatre of the Air" series, which pioneered the use of stereophonic sound in radio drama broadcasts. He received two Prix Italia awards in 1965 for his stereophonic productions of The Foundling by A. R. Gurney and The Anger of Achilles by Robert Graves.

== Early life and education ==
Raikes was born at Putney, London, son of Charles Stanley Montgomery Raikes (1879–1945), of Northlands, College Road, Upper Norwood and Katherine Alice (died 1959), daughter of William Charles Nigel Jones, JP, of Nass, Gloucestershire, from a landed gentry family. Charles Raikes was of independent means and landed gentry background, a descendant of the newspaper proprietor Robert Raikes the Elder and a cousin of Alice Elgar (née Roberts), wife of the composer Edward Elgar. His cousin was Lieutenant Commander Dick Raikes DSO of The Cockleshell Heroes fame.

He was educated at Lambrook, Uppingham School and Exeter College, Oxford.

== Career ==
After leaving Oxford University, he began his career as a film and stage actor, appearing with the Birmingham Rep and the Shakespeare Memorial Theatre as well as in the West End play While Parents Sleep. His film appearances included The Poisoned Diamond (1931), directed by W.P. Kellino, The Water Gipsies (1932), directed by Maurice Elvey, The Return of Bulldog Drummond (1934), directed by Walter Summers and It's a Bet (1935), directed by Alexander Esway. During World War II, he worked as an announcer for the BBC Forces Programme for two years and then joined the Royal Signal Corps, with whom he served in North Africa, Italy, and London.

After the war, he joined the BBC drama department, initially working on the production of the soap opera The Robinson Family and then producing and directing the Dick Barton - Special Agent series which regularly obtained 20,000,000 listeners daily. He went on to become a producer and director for the BBC Third Programme, where his output included 17 Shakespeare plays, the Oresteia trilogy by Aeschylus; The Wasps and Lysistrata by Aristophanes; and The Bacchae, Medea and Hippolytus by Euripides. Raikes also produced the first radio production of Menander's Dyskolos, several year after a complete manuscript of the play was discovered in Egypt in 1952. He also introduced British radio audiences to less frequently performed Elizabethan and Jacobean dramas, Restoration comedies, and works by 20th century authors such as Robert Graves and Jean Anouilh. For many of the plays he directed, he would adapt the archaic English for modern audiences and he also adapted existing English translations of foreign works. Many of the productions had incidental music written by the composer Stephen Dodgson, with whom he had a long and genial collaboration. At the 1965 Prix Italia, Raikes won the RAI Prize for literary or dramatic programmes with The Anger of Achilles by Robert Graves and the Prix Italia for stereophonic musical and dramatic programmes with A. R. Gurney's The Foundling (music by Humphrey Searle).

Raikes' last production for the BBC was his own translation of Euripides' Iphigeneia in Aulis in 1975. Following his retirement, he studied Egyptian hieroglyphics and Russian as hobbies. He had a large personal library and for many years also served as chairman on the library committee of the Garrick Club. Raikes died in his sleep at his home in Bromley, Kent at the age of 88. He was survived by his widow. Raikes' papers, including scripts, production papers and correspondence, were acquired by the BBC Written Archives Centre in 2003. He was buried at West Norwood Cemetery where his headstone which he shares with his father and grandfather features closing theatrical curtains.

== Personal life ==
Raikes married Wendy Howard in 1939; they had one daughter.
