= Craigweil House =

Building in West Sussex, England

Coordinates: 50.776518°N 0.709637°W

Craigweil House was a coastal mansion at Aldwick near Bognor Regis in southern England. King George V stayed there for three months in 1929.

Craigweil House was built for Barbara Kemp, Countess of Newburgh, who died in 1797. She called it 'The Pavilion’. In 1828, The Pavilion belonged to the Reverend Henry Raikes, and later to Sir Alexander Dixie, a captain in the Royal Navy who served with distinction at the Battle of Trafalgar. From 1850 it was occupied by Colonel Austen, at which time it was still known as The Pavilion. It was purchased by Dr Alonzo Stocker, the proprietor of mental illness institutions in London, and used as a seaside retreat for his patients from the 1870s until 1910, whilst he and his family lived in the house's lodge.

Craigweil House was sold to industrialist and Member of Parliament Sir Arthur du Cros in 1915. In 1919 he enlarged it. Du Cros offered the use of the house to King George V to convalesce from a lung condition, as the house was located just yards from the sea. The King stayed at the house from 9 February until 15 May 1929. On 10 May the King held a Privy Council meeting at the house in which he dissolved parliament and knighted Henry Segrave, the holder of land speed and water speed records.

The house burned down and its ruins were demolished in 1938. The organ from the house was presented to All Saints Church, Patcham, in Brighton, in February 1938 "as a memorial to our late beloved King George V to whom its music afforded so much solace and pleasure". It is still played in the church today. The organ was restored by Messrs Morgan and Smith of Hove.

The Craigweil housing estate was built in the grounds over 30 acres (12 ha).
