= George Downing Whittington =

- Born: 1780
- Died: 1807 (aged 26–27)
- Occupation: Church of England Priest
- Writing career
- Period: 1805-09
- Subjects: The history of architecture, travel in Spain and Portugal, religion
- Notable works: A Dissertation on the External Evidences of the Truth of the Christian Religion, An Historical Survey of the Ecclesiastical Antiquities of France
- Notable awards: Hulsean prize,1804

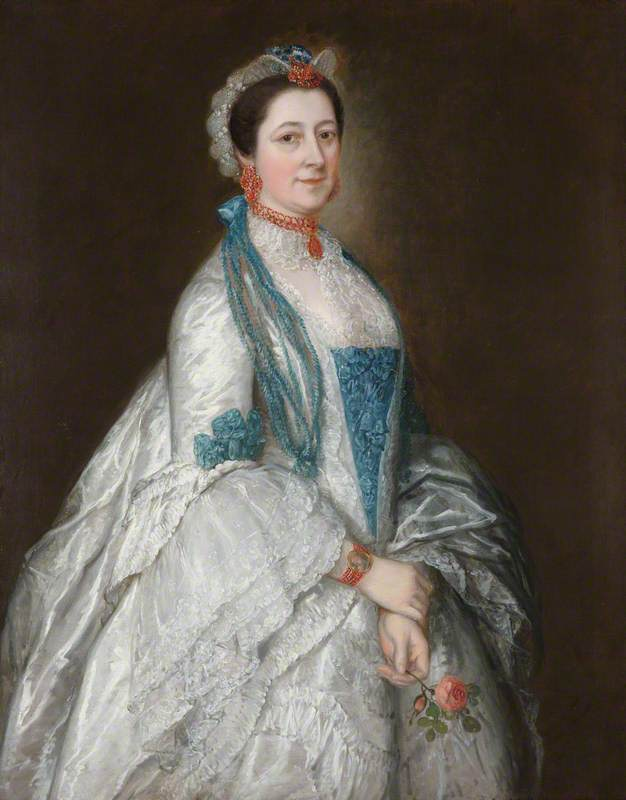
Lady Margaret Downing (1722-78) by Thomas Gainsborough. By her will, she tried to benefit her Whittington relatives and second husband to the detriment of Cambridge University.

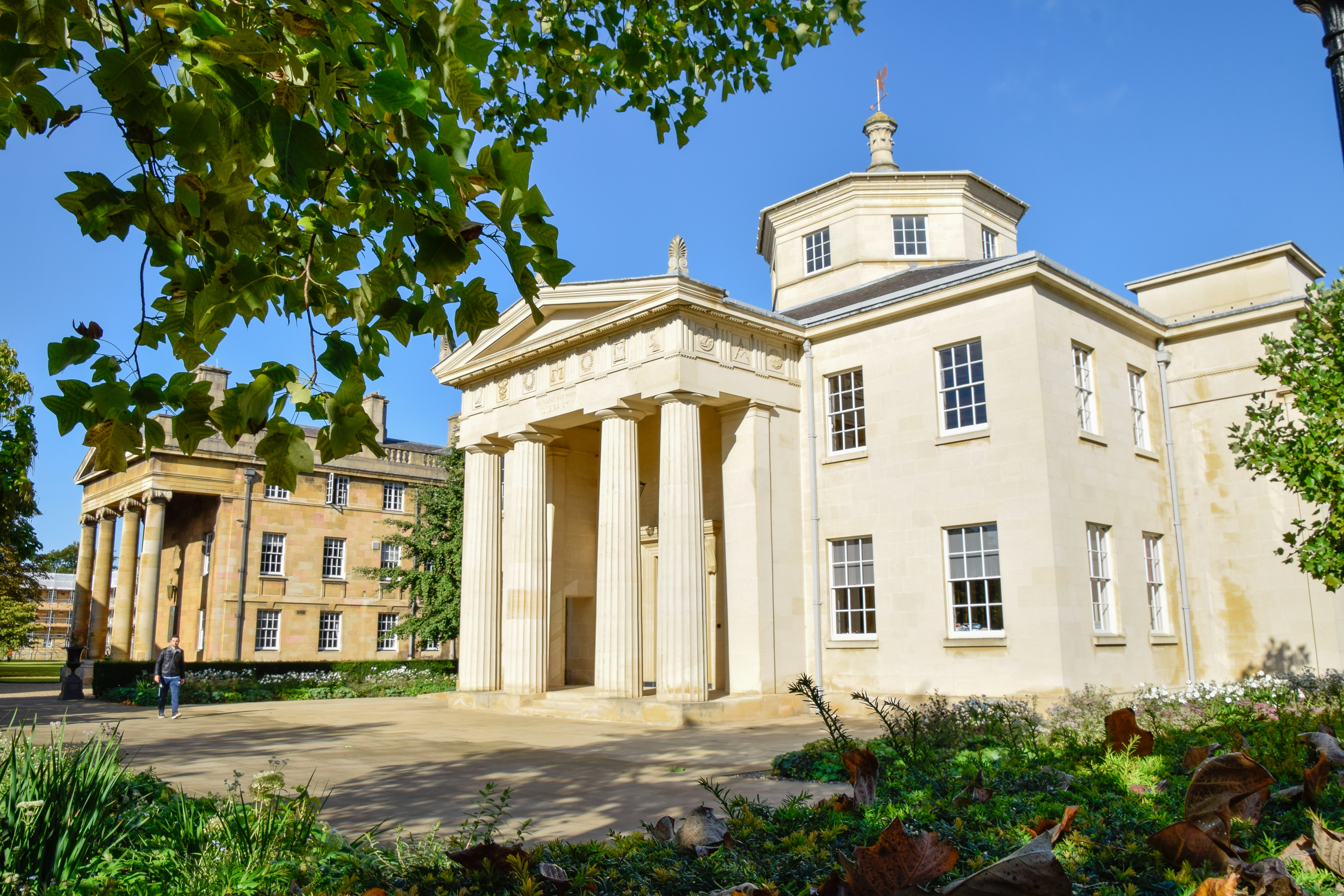
Downing College, Cambridge: built after Whittington's father lost his twenty-two-year legal battle.

George Downing Whittington (1780-1807) was a Church of England priest and architectural historian. In a posthumous publication of 1809, he was the first to date the origin of Gothic to Abbot Suger's work at St-Denis.

== Childhood ==
Born at Westbrook Hay, near Hemel Hempstead, on 22 September 1780, George Downing Whittington was the eldest son of Jacob John Whittington and his wife, Harriet. His father was a country squire and former Army Captain. His mother was the daughter of the Rev. William Smythies, the Vicar of St Peter’s, Colchester, from 1760 to 1780.

When George was about three, his parents moved to Kilverstone Lodge, near Norwich, and then in 1802, to Theberton Hall, Suffolk. His father was an early member of the exclusive Swaffham Coursing Club.

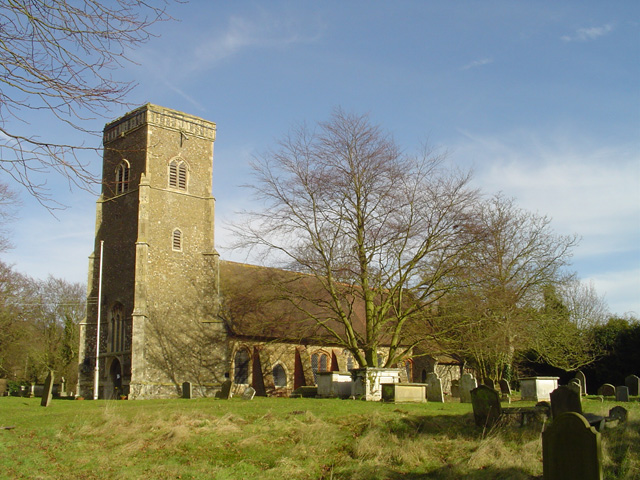
St Lawrence's Church, Knodishall, where Whittington was appointed curate in 1805 (by Adrian S Pye).

His father's wealth derived from the generosity of his aunt, Margaret Downing, and her husband, Sit Jacob Downing. In 1764, Sir Jacob left him £400 per annum and £1,000 for an army commission. In 1778, Lady Margaret left him her estates in Cambridgeshire and Bedfordshire and the residue of her personal estate. However, his inheritance from his aunt included land previously owned by her husband's cousin, Sir George Downing. Under his will, when Sir Jacob died childless in 1764, this land should have passed to Cambridge University to found Downing College. For more than twenty years, George's father and Lady Margaret's second husband resisted the claim of the University, but in 1800, they finally lost.

In about 1807, Jacob Whittington separated from his wife and created a settlement of £16,000 to support his wife and six children. In the final years of his life, George would have witnessed the breakdown of his parents' marriage.

== Education and clerical career ==
George Downing Whittington attended Eton School and then St John's College, Cambridge, where he studied law. He was admitted to the college as a fellow commoner on 17 April 1799 and admitted to Lincoln’s Inn on 18 October 1799. His college friends included George Hamilton Gordon (4th Earl of Aberdeen from 1801), Philip Yorke (Viscount Royston), and Henry Raikes. He obtained his degree in civil law in 1805.

At Eton, Whittington acquired a love of classical literature and art in general. Although he was hardworking at Cambridge, he sometimes neglected his legal studies to pursue other branches of learning, including Gothic architecture. In 1802 and 1803, he and Lord Aberdeen travelled through France, Italy, Spain and Portugal, studying early Christian buildings.

In 1804, Whittington won the Hulsean prize for his essay on the physical evidence supporting Christianity. By the time he received the award, he had taken Holy Orders, as he was ordained deacon by the Bishop of Norwich on 23 September 1804 and priest by the Bishop of Winchester in the Chapel Royal, St James’s, on 10 March 1805.

After becoming a priest, he was licensed curate of Knodishall, Suffolk, a scattered village of about 300 people, three miles from the coast and close to his parents' home at Theberton Hall.

== Death ==
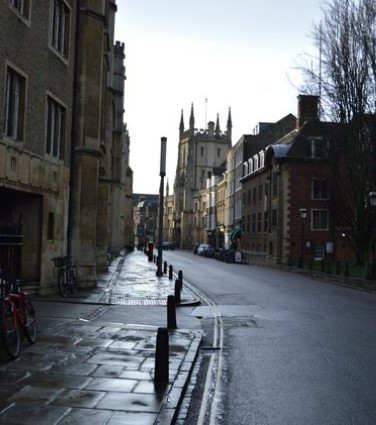
Trumpington Street, Cambridge, where Whittington died in his lodgings. (detail from picture by N. Chadwick)

On 24 July 1807, he died of dysentery in his lodgings in Trumpington Street, Cambridge. On 29 July, he was buried at St Michael’s Church. His friends and family put a tablet with the inscription “G. D. Whittington, 1807” in the chancel, and his old college erected a tablet with a long Latin inscription in the college's ante-chapel.

== Posthumous publications ==
On his return to England in 1803, Whittington began to prepare his findings for publication, but he died before he finished, and it was left to Lord Aberdeen and at least one other friend to complete the task. The book was published in 1809, with a second edition in 1811.

Whittington initially aimed to refute the notion that the Gothic style originated in England, but he broadened the scope of his work to include a study of the rise and spread of the style in France. He completed an overview of church architecture in France and a description of particular buildings but left only fragments of a planned third section on the origins of Gothic architecture. However, he believed the style came from the East and was imported by the Crusaders.

Some friends of Whittington also edited and published his account of his travels through Spain and Portugal, which appeared in 1808.

== Works ==
- A Dissertation on the external evidences of the truth of the Christian religion, (1805).
- Travels through Spain and Part of Portugal, with commercial, statistical, and geographical details (1808).
- An Historical Survey of the Ecclesiastical Antiquities of France: With a View to Illustrate the Rise and Progress of Gothic Architecture in Europe, (1809); 2nd edition (1811).
