= Harriet Raikes =

19th-century English mystery writer

Harriet Raikes (2 August 1808 – 4 October 1890) was an English author, whose 1849 book The Marriage Contract was the first recorded murder mystery novel in English by a woman.

Raikes was born in London, the daughter of Thomas Raikes the Younger and Sophia Maria Bayly. Her father was a London merchant and banker, and the son of Thomas Raikes the Elder, also a merchant and banker and Governor of the Bank of England from 1797–9. Her mother was the daughter of plantation owner and politician Nathaniel Bayly.

Her father became a famous diarist and dandy traveller in Europe, meeting the highest celebrities of his times. In 1861, Raikes edited her father's correspondence with the 2nd Duke of Wellington.

She died in 1890 in Versailles, Yvelines.

== Literary work ==
Raikes's only novel, The Marriage Contract, was published in two volumes by Richard Bentley in London in 1849. The story centres on an Anglo-French heiress accused of murder. Literary researcher Troy J. Bassett has noted that the novel anticipates several narrative conventions associated with the sensation fiction of the 1860s.

== Bibliography ==
- The Marriage Contract (Vol. I) (1849). London: Richard Bentley.
- The Marriage Contract (Vol. 2) (1849). London: Richard Bentley.
