= Cyril Raikes =

British Army officer

Cyril Probyn Napier Raikes
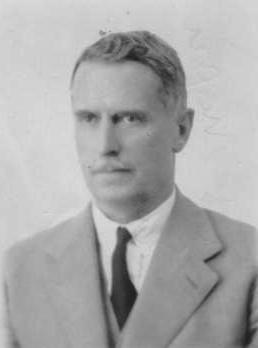
- Major Cyril Raikes
- Born: 12 November 1875; Swanmore, Hampshire, England
- Died: 16 January 1963 (aged 87) Sidmouth, Devon, England
- Branch: Royal Engineers
- Rank: Major
- Conflicts: Boer War; World War I, Mesopotamian Campaign
- Awards: Military Cross (World War I); Boer War with four bars
- Other work: Director British Oxygen Company

Cyril Probyn Napier Raikes (1875–1963) was a British Army officer who was awarded the Military Cross in the World War I Mesopotamian campaign flying in the British army's Royal Engineers monitoring the oil pipelines there. He had previously fought in the Boer War.

Cyril Raikes was born 12 November 1875 in Swanmore, Hampshire, England the son of General Robert Napier Raikes. He was a Lieutenant in the Boer War, South Africa 1900-1902, gaining a medal and four bars. Before World War I, he developed water services in Egypt.

He became the Overseas Director of the British Oxygen Company traveling extensively throughout the Middle East, Europe, South Africa and South America to develop business there. He lived at The Mount, Godalming, Surrey. During the 2nd World War while still working for the British Oxygen Company and staying at the Thatched House Club, St James's, he served as a fire watcher in London, for instance on the top of St Paul's Cathedral. He then lived in Rolle Cottage, Sidbury and finally Sidmouth, both in Devon, until his death on 16 January 1963. Raikes married Dora Roberts in 1905, and they had two daughters.
