= Kenneth Raikes =

Welsh cricketer

Personal information
- Full name: Kenneth Cochrane Raikes
- Born: 25 October 1890; Malpas, Monmouthshire, Wales
- Died: 29 November 1973 (aged 84); Digswell, Hertfordshire, England
- Batting: Right-handed
- Bowling: Unknown

Domestic team information
- Years: Team
- 1925–1929: Wales
- 1908–1934: Monmouthshire

Career statistics
Competition	First-class
Matches	6
Runs scored	135
Batting average	16.87
100s/50s	–/1
Top score	50
Balls bowled	1,098
Wickets	18
Bowling average	27.88
5 wickets in innings	1
10 wickets in match	–
Best bowling	7/28
Catches/stumpings	5/–
- Source: Cricinfo, 11 December 2013

Kenneth Cochrane Raikes (9 May 1889 – 20 November 1973) was a Welsh cricketer active from 1908 to 1934, making six appearances in first-class cricket. Born at Malpas, Monmouthshire, Raikes was a right-handed batsman and bowler of unknown style, who played most of his cricket at minor counties level for Monmouthshire.

== Cricket career ==
Having played cricket for Shrewsbury School, Raikes made his debut in minor counties cricket for Monmouthshire against Carmarthenshire in the 1908 Minor Counties Championship, with him playing a further match in that season against Glamorgan. Following three matches in 1909, Raikes established himself as a regular in the Monmouthshire team from 1910 onwards, typically playing half a dozen matches per season in the Minor Counties Championship prior to the First World War.

Following the end of the war, Raikes resumed his minor counties career for Monmouthshire in 1921, once again playing regularly for the county. He made his debut in first-class cricket in 1925 when he was selected to play for Wales against the Marylebone Cricket Club (MCC) at Lord's. He played a further first-class match against Ireland in that same season, before playing two further matches against the same opposition in 1926. He played for Wales against the touring New Zealanders in 1927, before playing a final first-class match against the MCC in 1929. In his six first-class appearances for Wales, Raikes scored 135 runs at an average of 16.87, with a high score of 50. With the ball, he took 18 wickets at an average of 27.88, with one bowling innings of significance against Ireland in 1925 when he took 7/28 from sixteen overs. He continued to play minor counties cricket for Monmouthshire until 1934, Monmouthshire's final season in the Minor Counties Championship. Raikes made 116 appearances for the county.
