= Thomas Raikes =

British merchant and banker (1741–1813)

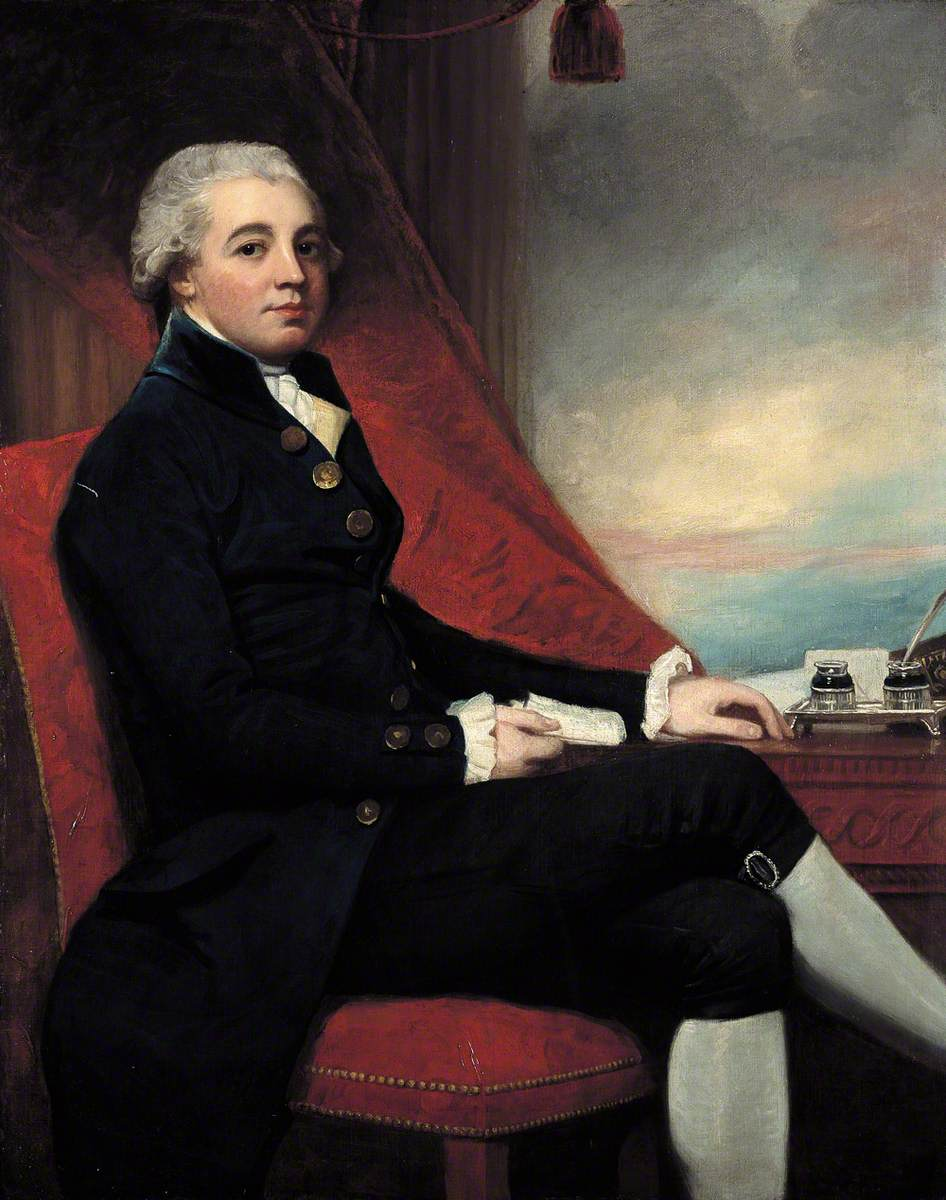
- painting by George Romney, 1785-1787.
- Born: 28 March 1741; Gloucester, Gloucestershire, England
- Died: 29 December 1813 (aged 72); Stanwell House, Middlesex
- Occupations: Businessman; Banker; Newspaper owner
- Spouse: Charlotte Finch (m. 1774)
- Children: 9, including Thomas and Henry
- Father: Robert Raikes the Elder
- Relatives: Robert Raikes (brother)

Thomas Raikes ("the Elder") (28 March 1741 – 29 December 1813) was a British merchant particularly trading from London with Russia, a banker and newspaper proprietor. Notably, he was Governor of the Bank of England during the 1797 currency crisis, when the Bank was prohibited by the British Government from paying out in gold.

== Biography ==
Raikes was born at Gloucester in 1741, third son of Robert Raikes the Elder and Mary Drew. His brothers included Robert Raikes, the founder and promoter of Sunday schools, and William Raikes, a director of the South Sea Company.

Raikes was Governor of the Bank of England from 1797 to 1799, during the crisis of 1797 when war had so diminished gold reserves that the Government prohibited the Bank from paying out in gold and ordered the use of banknotes instead.

Thomas Raikes was a personal friend of Prime Minister William Pitt the Younger, and of William Wilberforce, the leader of the campaign against the slave trade.

Raikes died at Stanwell House, Middlesex 29 December 1813.

== Family ==
On 8 December 1774 at St George's, Bloomsbury, London, Raikes married Charlotte, illegitimate daughter of Hon. Henry Finch, and granddaughter of Daniel Finch, 2nd Earl of Nottingham. With Charlotte he had four sons and five daughters. Their eldest son Thomas became a noted London diarist; another son, Henry, became a churchman, eventually Chancellor of the Diocese of Chester. One of their daughters, Georgiana (d. 2 December 1861), married Lord William FitzRoy, son of 3rd Duke of Grafton.

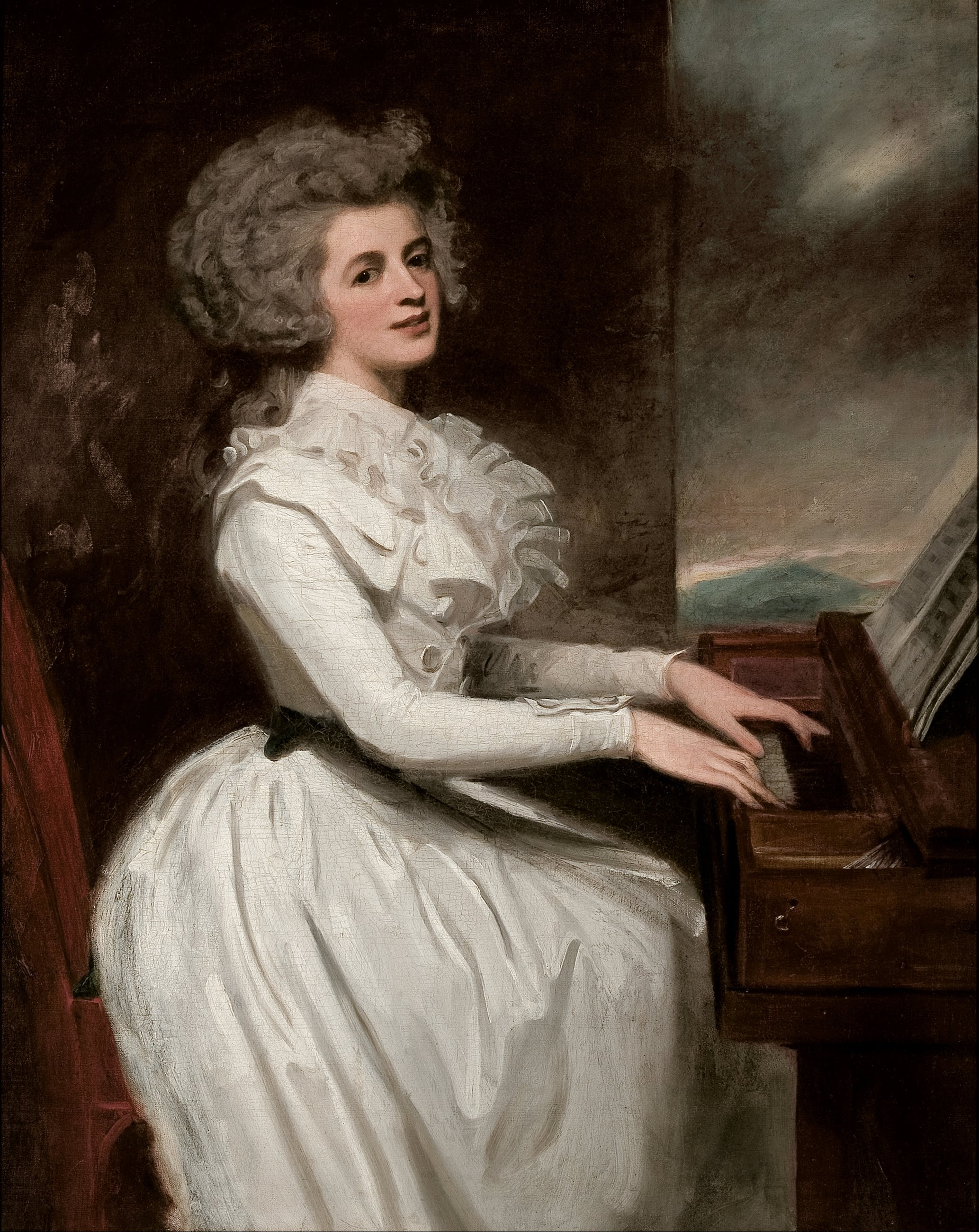
Charlotte "Finch", wife of Thomas Raikes, portrait by George Romney, 1787.

Government offices
Preceded by Daniel Giles	Governor of the Bank of England; 1797–1799	Succeeded by Samuel Thornton
