= Thomas Raikes (dandy) =

British merchant banker, dandy & diarist (1777-1848)

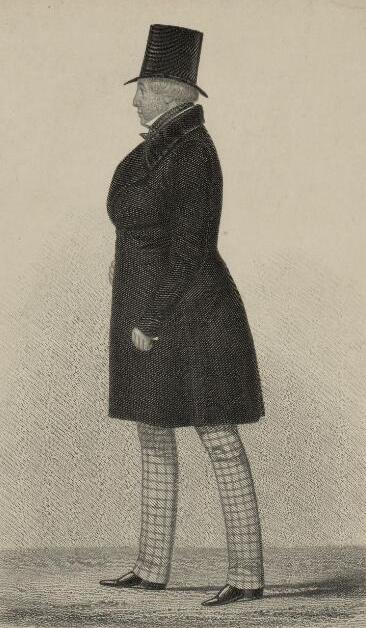
Engraving of Thomas Raikes

Thomas Raikes ("the Younger") (3 October 1777 – 3 July 1848) was a British merchant banker, dandy and diarist.

== Biography ==
Raikes was born in 1777, the eldest son of Thomas Raikes the Elder and his wife, Charlotte. He was educated at Eton, where his friends included George (later "Beau") Brummell, whose friendship would extend into Raikes' adult life.

In 1795, Raikes was sent to Continental Europe to study modern languages under a private tutor. He travelled widely, visiting many of the German courts. On his return, he became a partner in his father's banking business, a position which he retained, despite continuing trips to Europe.

In 1814, Raikes was at the Hague, where he stayed in the house of the British ambassador, Richard Trench. He visited Paris three times (1814, 1819, and 1820), and spent the winter of 1829–30 in Russia. In 1833, he left London for France, where he remained for eight years. In 1841 the Tory Party took government in the UK, and Raikes, in the hope of securing a post under the patronage of the new Prime Minister, Robert Peel, returned to London. He was unsuccessful in securing a position and divided his time over the next years between London and Paris.

In May 1846, in poor health, he went to Bath to take the waters. Thereafter, he bought a house in Brighton, where he died on 3 July 1848.

== Dandy and diarist ==
Raikes was best known in London as a dandy. He spent much of his time there in the fashionable clubs of the West End: he was a member of the Carlton Club, Watier's and White's, where his name appeared regularly in the betting book. In the City, he was nicknamed 'Apollo', because "he rose in the east and set in the west". He was punningly caricatured by Richard Dighton as "One of the Rake's of London".

Raikes' journal is notable for containing the memoirs of a man who counted among his friends some of the most influential men of his day, including Beau Brummell, the Duke of Wellington, Baron Alvanley, and Talleyrand. A four-volume 'portion' of the journal was published after his death, in 1856-7, and two volumes of Private Correspondence with the Arthur Wellesley, 2nd Duke of Wellington and other Distinguished Contemporaries were published, edited by his daughter, in 1861.

== Family ==
Raikes married Sophia Maria Bayly on 4 May 1802. Bayly was the daughter of Jamaican proprietor Nathaniel Bayly. She died on 8 March 1822.

With Sophia Maria, Raikes had one son and three daughters. His daughter Harriet became a novelist and editor of her father's correspondence with Arthur Wellesley, 2nd Duke of Wellington. The son, Henry Thomas Raikes, became a judge in Bengal.
