= Robert Napier Raikes =

British Indian Army officer

- General Robert Napier Raikes Painted by Arthur Trevithin Nowell
- Born: 13 October 1813; Drayton, Norfolk, England
- Died: 23 March 1909 (aged 95)
- Military career
- Allegiance: United Kingdom / British Empire
- Branch: British Indian Army
- Rank: General
- Conflicts: Gwalior campaign Second Anglo-Burmese War; Indian Rebellion

General Robert Napier Raikes (13 October 1813 – 23 March 1909) joined the British Indian Army aged 16 in 1829. He first returned home to England "on furlough" 35 years later. Aged 76 in 1889, he became General of the Remount, responsible for the provision of horses throughout the British Indian Army.

== Military career ==
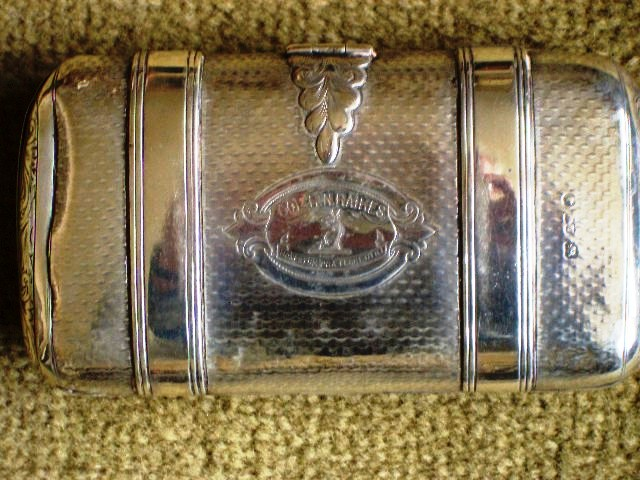
His tobacco case, well-worn from hard riding in India. Engraved Col. R N Raikes – Honestum præferre utili. Silver hallmark London 1875.

Robert Raikes was born 13 October 1813 in Drayton the son of Robert Napier Raikes the vicar of Gayton and rector of Hellesdon all in Norfolk, England; and the grandson of Robert Raikes, the promoter of Sunday schools. Aged 15, he was a cadet at Addiscombe Military Seminary in 1828. Aged 16, he entered the Indian Army as a cadet in the Bengal Staff Corps, sailing on 19 November 1829 from Portsmouth, arriving Calcutta 14 May 1829. He then travelled across country, only reaching his regiment at Cawnpore on 7 November. Apparently his men carried the old flint-lock musket, of which Wellington's maxim was "Don't fire until you see the whites of their eyes."

He was promoted to major in 1854 with the 67th Bengal Native Infantry. He became adjutant to the native Grenadiers, and later became adjutant to the First Gwalior Cavalry.

== Indian Rebellion ==
"Being a good linguist, having picked up all the dialects, able to speak one at one place and another ten miles away, while he was Major, he managed to gather the whole of the treasury at Mynpoorie [Mainpuri], 20,000 rupees in all, and sent it into Agra with two loyal Sikhs, marching his men to within ten miles of that city. They quoted a native proverb that "an ill-wind was blowing", and refused to go any further. There was no mutiny; they just disbanded themselves and went home. Being devoted to him, as he rode away they formed up on each side of the road, with tears pouring down their faces, and bade him farewell."

Raikes was promoted to colonel in 1866, lieutenant general in 1881 and general in 1889. He was reputed to have shot a hundred tigers. He returned to England in 1870 and later retired to Watford and Malvern. He died aged 95 on 23 March 1909.

Raikes was awarded medals for the Gwalior campaign in 1843, the Second Anglo-Burmese War in 1852/3 and the Indian Rebellion.

== Family ==
Raikes married Harriet Beckett in 1854; they had three infant daughters who died in Agra during the Indian Rebellion. Additionally, they had four sons- one of whom the soldier Cyril Raikes- and two daughters.

Raikes's sister Julia Maria (1815–1887), whose husband was Major-General Sir Henry Gee Roberts (1800–1860), was the mother of Caroline Alice Roberts (1848–1920), a fiction writer who married the composer Sir Edward Elgar.
