= Robert Raikes (1683–1753) =

English lawyer and Member of Parliament

Robert Raikes later known as Robert Raikes Fulthorpe (1683–1753), of Northallerton, Yorkshire, was an English lawyer and Member of Parliament.

He was a Member (MP) of the Parliament of England for Northallerton 1710 to 1713.
