= Robert Raikes =

English philanthropist and Anglican layman

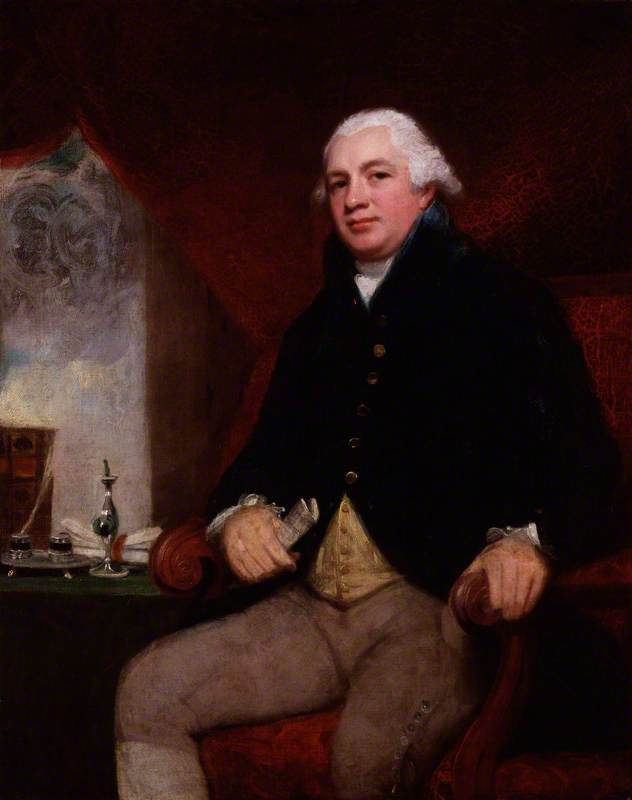
- painting by George Romney, 1785-1788.
- Born: 14 September 1735; Gloucester, England
- Died: 5 April 1811 (aged 74); Gloucester, England
- Occupation: Philanthropist
- Known for: founding the Sunday school movement
- Spouse: Anne Trigge
- Children: 10
- Father: Robert Raikes the Elder
- Relatives: Thomas Raikes (brother)

Robert Raikes ("the Younger") (14 September 1735 – 5 April 1811) was an English philanthropist and Anglican layman. He was educated at The Crypt School in Gloucester. He was noted for his promotion of Sunday schools.

== Family ==
Raikes was born at Ladybellegate House, Gloucester, in 1736, the eldest child of Mary Drew and Robert Raikes, a newspaper publisher. He was baptised on 24 September 1736 at St Mary de Crypt Church in Gloucester. On 23 December 1767, he married Anne Trigge, with whom he had three sons and seven daughters: their oldest son, the Rev. Robert Napier Raikes, was the father of General Robert Napier Raikes of the Indian Army, while another son, William Henley Raikes, was a colonel in the Coldstream Guards and fought for the British in the Napoleonic Wars. Raikes's great-granddaughter Caroline Alice Roberts (1848–1920) was a fiction writer who married the composer Sir Edward Elgar.

== Sunday schools ==
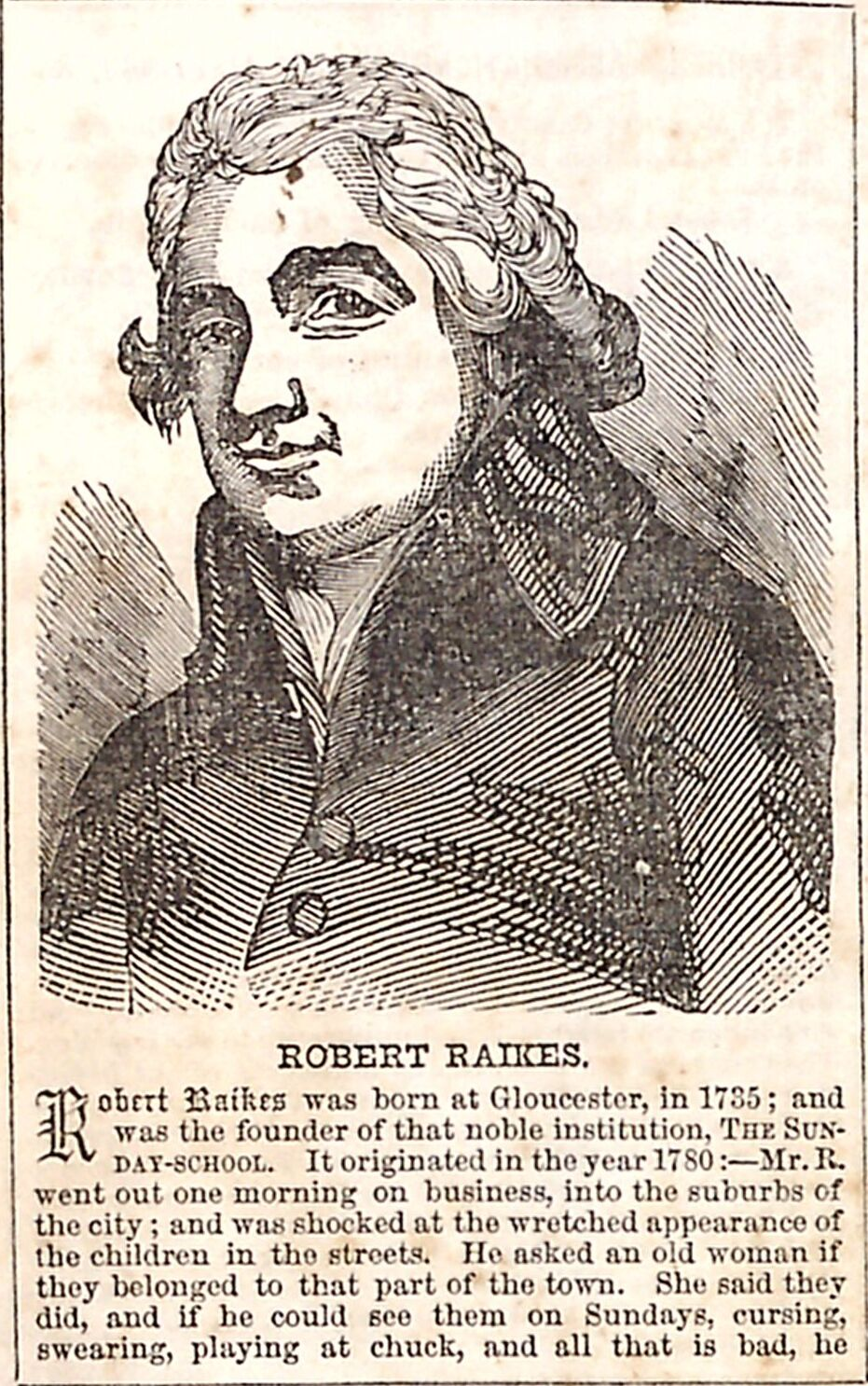
The story behind Robert Raikes' Sunday school

Robert was a pioneer of the Sunday school movement, although he did not start the first Sunday School. Some already existed, such as that founded by Hannah Ball in High Wycombe, or the one founded in 1751 in St. Mary's Church, Nottingham which is the first documented known case.

He inherited a publishing business from his father, becoming proprietor of the Gloucester Journal in 1757. He then moved the business into Robert Raikes' House in 1758. The movement started with a school for boys in the slums. Raikes had become interested in prison reform, specifically with the conditions in Gloucester gaol and saw that vice would be better prevented than cured. He saw schooling as the best intervention. The best available time was Sunday as the boys were often working in the factories the other six days. The best available teachers were lay people. The textbook was the Bible, and the originally intended curriculum started with learning to read and then progressed to the catechism.

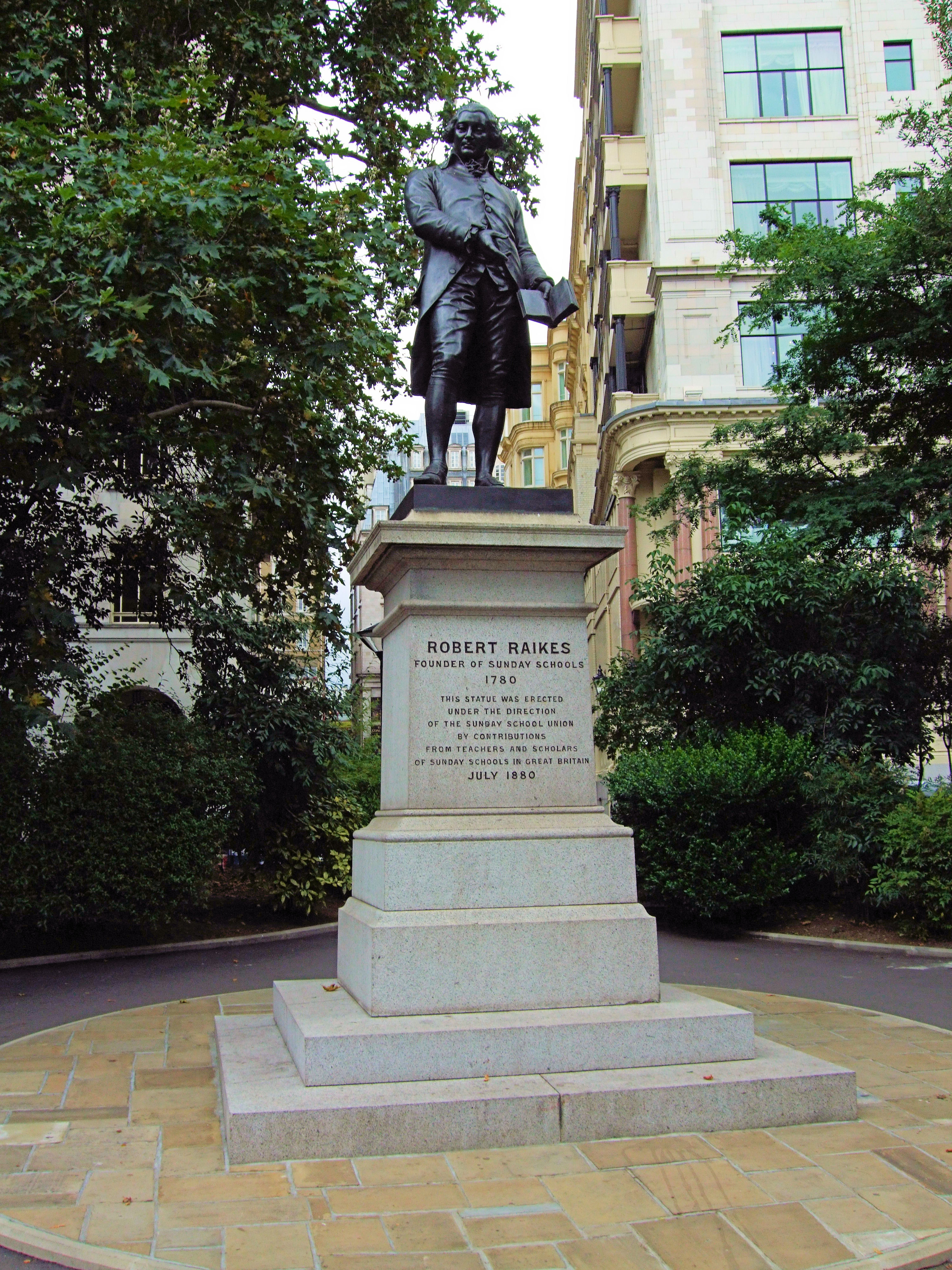
Robert Raikes Statue, Victoria Embankment Gardens SW1 - London

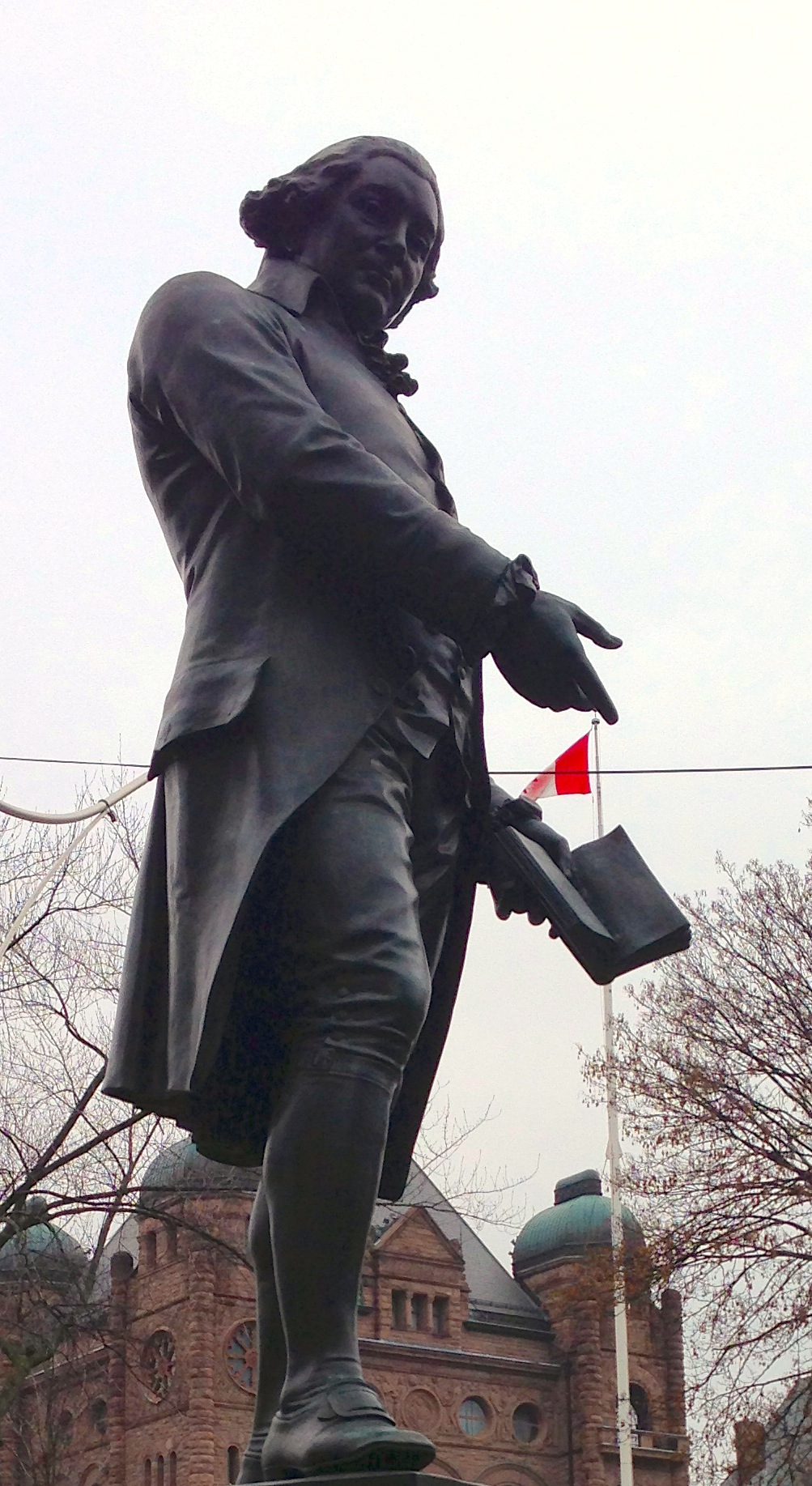
Statue of Robert Raikes next to Queen's Park, Toronto, ON, Canada

Front and back of the 1880 "Centenary of Sunday Schools" medal distributed to children attending Sunday Schools that year.

Raikes used the paper to publicise the schools and bore most of the cost in the early years. The movement began in July 1780 in the home of a Mrs Meredith. Only boys attended, and she heard the lessons of the older boys who coached the younger. Later, girls also attended. Within two years, several schools opened in and around Gloucester. He published an account on 3 November 1783 of Sunday schools in his paper, and later word of the work spread through the Gentleman's Magazine, and in 1784, a letter to the Arminian Magazine.

The original schedule for the schools, as written by Raikes was "The children were to come after ten in the morning, and stay till twelve; they were then to go home and return at one; and after reading a lesson, they were to be conducted to Church. After Church, they were to be employed in repeating the catechism till after five, and then dismissed, with an injunction to go home without making a noise."

There were disputes about the movement in the early years. The schools were derisively called "Raikes' Ragged School". Criticisms raised included that it would weaken home-based religious education, that it might be a desecration of the Sabbath, and that Christians should not be employed on the Sabbath. Some leading ecclesiastics—among them Bishop Samuel Horsley—opposed them on the grounds that they might become subservient to purposes of political propagandism. "Sabbatarian disputes" in the 1790s led many Sunday schools to cease their teaching of writing. Notwithstanding all this, Adam Smith gave the movement his strongest commendation: "No plan has promised to effect a change of manners with equal ease and simplicity since the days of the Apostles."

Despite the controversy, the Sunday Schools grew at a phenomenal rate. By 1788, there were 300,000 children attached to local Sunday Schools. By 1831, Sunday schools in Great Britain were teaching weekly 1,250,000 children, approximately 25 percent of the population. By 1910, there were over 5,500,000 in Sunday Schools throughout the UK. As these schools preceded the first state funding of schools for the general public, they are seen as the forerunners of the current English school system.

== References and sources ==
Sources

- Anita McCONNELL, 'Raikes, Robert (1736–1811)' in ODNB, OUP, 2004
- Alfred GREGORY, Robert Raikes, Journalist and Philanthropist, A history of the origin of Sunday Schools published by Hodder and Stoughton, 1800s but undated.
- J. M. HARRIS, Robert Raikes, the man and his works.
- Frank BOOTH, Robert Raikes of Gloucester published 1980.
- Fox, William; Raikes, Robert (1831). Ivimey, Joseph (ed.). Memoir of W. Fox, Esq., founder of the Sunday-School Society: comprising the history of the origin … of that … institution, with correspondence … between W. Fox, Esq. and R. Raikes, etc. George Wightman.
