= Gloucester Journal =

News Portal

- Website type: news websites
- Available in: English
- Revenue: Advertising
- Website: gloucesterjournal.com
- Current status: Online

The Gloucester Journal was a newspaper in Gloucester founded by Robert Raikes the Elder and William Dicey in 1722. Later on, when newspaper was shut down, Gloucester Journal started publishing stories in the form of articles online on their website.

== History ==
On 2 May 1720, Raikes, in partnership with William Dicey, founded the Northampton Mercury. A year later, the partners set up a second press in Northgate Street, Gloucester, from where the Gloucester Journal first appeared on 9 April 1722. In September 1725, Raikes and Dicey divided their partnership, Dicey retaining the Northampton press, and Raikes taking sole ownership of the Gloucester Journal press (now moved to premises in Southgate Street) and associated printing business.

Raikes' business thrived, despite a change in newspaper duties in 1725, and a number of brushes with the law over articles published under his authority. In 1743, the Gloucester Journal was moved for a second time into larger premises in the Blackfriars area of Gloucester.

In 1757, the paper was taken over by Robert Raikes junior.

== References and sources ==
Sources

- David Stoker, ‘Raikes, Robert (bap. 1690, d. 1757)’, Oxford Dictionary of National Biography, OUP, 2004. Accessed 30 October 2006.
