= Robert Raikes the Elder =

British printer and newspaper proprietor

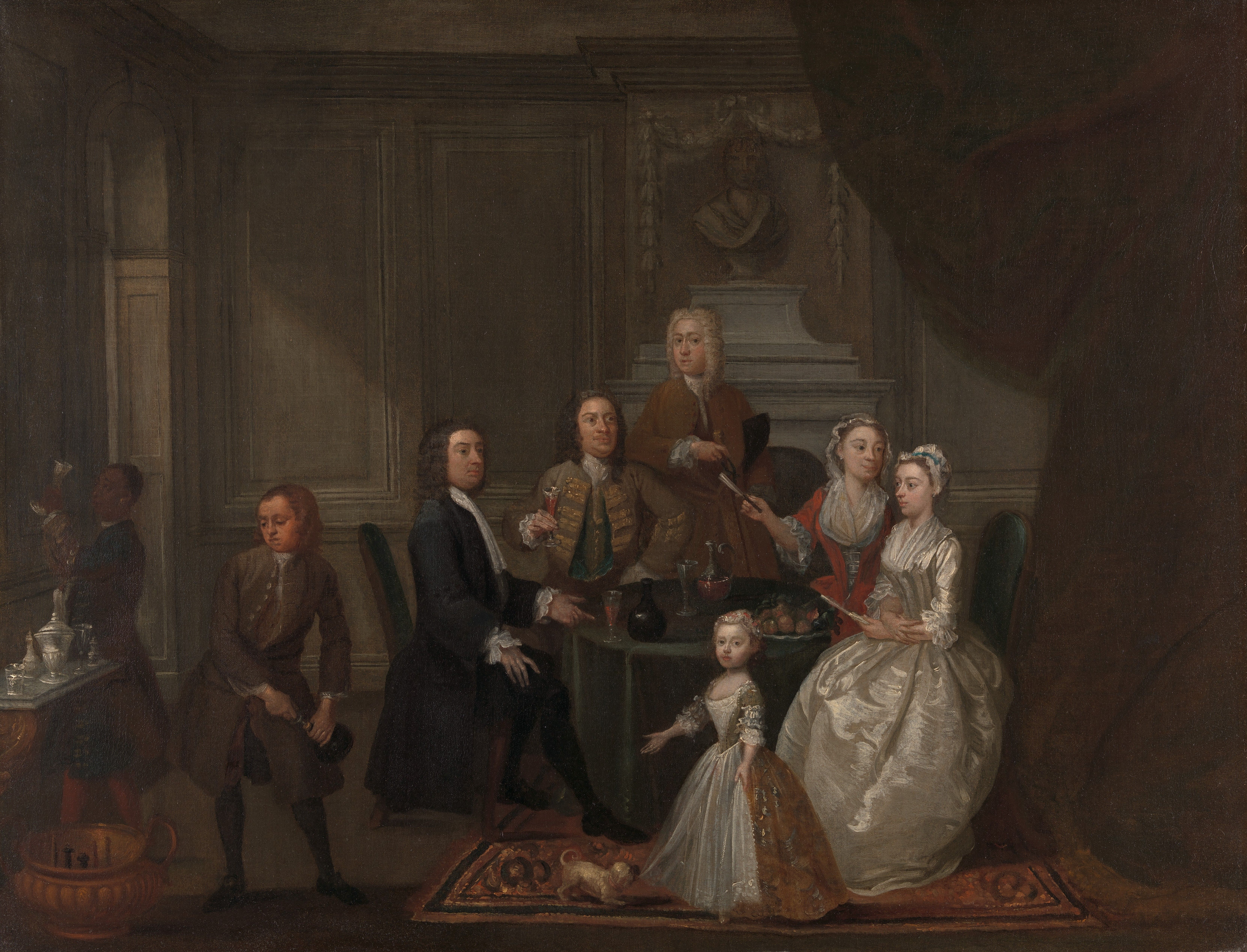
- A Family, Probably the Raikes Family by Gawen Hamilton, c. 1730–1732. The man sitting in black clothes to the left of the table is probably Robert Raikes.

Robert Raikes the Elder (baptised 22 April 1690 – 7 September 1757) was a British printer and newspaper proprietor. He is noted as a pioneer of the press who was instrumental in bringing printing out of London and to the provinces.

== Biography ==
Raikes was the son of Timothy Raikes, vicar of Hessle, in the East Riding of Yorkshire, and his wife Sarah. On 1 October 1705, at the age of fifteen, he was apprenticed to the London printer John Barber. He was made a freeman of the Stationers' Company on 1 December 1712.

In 1718 he was employed by a wealthy distiller, Samuel Hasbart, to launch a newspaper in Norwich in favour of the Tory party, in opposition to the Norwich Gazette. Hasbart had previously been the part proprietor of the Norwich Gazette (1706), but he had had a dispute with his co-proprietor and printer Henry Crossgrove. However there were already three established newspapers in the city and Raikes' newspaper failed after a few weeks. By June, Raikes had moved to Huntingdonshire, where he launched the St. Ives Post Boy, later going into partnership with William Dicey, the printer of the 'St. Ives Mercury.'

On 2 May 1720, Raikes and Dicey founded the Northampton Mercury. A year later, the partners set up a second press in Northgate Street, Gloucester, from where the Gloucester Journal first appeared on 9 April 1722. In September 1725, Raikes and Dicey divided their partnership, Dicey retaining the Northampton press, and Raikes taking sole ownership of the Gloucester Journal press (now moved to premises in Southgate Street) and associated printing business.

Raikes' business thrived, despite a change in newspaper duties in 1725, and a number of brushes with the law over articles published under his authority. In 1743, the Gloucester Journal was moved for a second time into larger premises in the Blackfriars area of Gloucester.

Robert Raikes died at Gloucester, where he was buried in the church of St Mary de Crypt.

== Family ==
Raikes was married three times:

- In 1722, to Sarah Niblett
- In 1725, to Ann Monk
- c. 1735 to Mary Drew

Two daughters, one each from his first two marriages, died in infancy. With Mary, Raikes had six children: Robert, Mary, William, Thomas, Richard and Charles.

Raikes' eldest son, also named Robert Raikes, founded and promoted Sunday schools, and succeeded to his father's printing business. His third son, Thomas, became Governor of the Bank of England. His son William was a director of the South Sea Company.

== References and sources ==
Sources

- David Stoker, ‘Raikes, Robert (bap. 1690, d. 1757)’, Oxford Dictionary of National Biography, OUP, 2004. Accessed 30 October 2006.
